= List of fried dough foods =

This is a list of fried dough foods. Many cultures have dishes that are prepared by deep-frying dough in many various forms. Doughnuts are a type of fried dough food that are covered separately in the Wikipedia article List of doughnut varieties.

== Fried dough foods ==
Name	Image	Origin	Description (including main ingredients and notable aspects)
Akara, acarajé		Nigeria, Brazil	Fried dough made from ground black-eyed peas or black-eyed pea flour. Onions, peppers, and salt to taste are added for more flavor. Typically eaten as a breakfast with "pap", or custard locally called akamu by Igbo people.
Achappam		Kerala, India	Sweet, shaped like a star
Angel wings		Poland	Crisp, fried-dough served on Fat Thursday, dusted with powdered sugar
Awameh		Levant	is a kind of fried-dough Levantine pastry similar to doughnut holes, made of deep-fried dough, soaked in sugar syrup or honey and cinnamon, and sometimes sprinkled with sesame.
Bambalouni		Tunisia	A sweet donut, made from frying dough in oil, eaten with sugar on top or honey
Bamiyeh, zulbiā, ballıbadı		Iran, Azerbaijan	Traditional treat made from a yogurt and starch-based dough, which is fried before being dipped in syrup. Similar to Turkish tulumba.
Bánh chuối chiên		Vietnam	Banana fritter. Several varieties of banana may be used.
Bánh gối		Vietnam	Empanada-like pastry filled with minced cellophane noodles, minced pork, cloud ear fungus, and thin slices of Chinese sausage
Bánh rán, bánh cam		Vietnam	Glutinous rice ball coated with white sesame seeds and filled with sweetened mung bean paste
Bánh rế		Vietnam	Sweet potato pancake
Bánh tôm (bánh tôm Hồ Tây)		Vietnam	Sweet potato–battered shrimp fritter.
Bánh xèo		Vietnam	Savory pancake made with rice flour and turmeric and stuffed with various ingredients
Bannock		Canada	Also called frybread
Bannock		Scotland	A bread the same thickness as a scone. Native Americans and particularly Métis, in western Canada and the northern Great Plains in the United States, adopted bannock in their own cuisine over the 18th and 19th centuries.
BeaverTails		Canada	Pastries; registered trademark, oblong-shaped fried dough, like a beaver tail (hence the name)
Beignet		France	The pastry is also present in New Orleans, Louisiana, as a deep-fried choux pastry covered with confectioner's sugar in the U.S. and Belgium, and sometimes described as a French doughnut; however, as with other variants of fried sweet pastry, the beignet typically has its own distinctive characteristics (shape and texture). These differences are sufficient in the minds of some of beignet devotees to object to it being considered a doughnut.
Berliner		Germany	The doughnut equivalents, typically do not have the typical ring shape (except for a variety in southern Germany as so-called Auszogne which have a ring shape but a skin in the middle) but instead are solid, usually filled with jam. (German doughnuts are sometimes called "Berlin doughnuts" in the US.)
Bhatoora		Indian Punjab, Pakistan	Very chewy bread made by flattened dough being fried until it puffs into a light brown fluffy form.
Binangkal		Philippines	Deep-fried flour balls covered with sesame seeds
Bolang baling (also known as odading)		Indonesia	Deep-fried sweet dough balls covered with crystal sugar or sesame seeds. Possibly influenced from the Dutch Oliebollen.
Bolinho de chuva		Brazil	Deep-fried sweet dough balls
Bomboloni		Italy	Similar to German Berliner, with a cream (or chocolate) filling.
Boortsog		Central Asia	A fried dough food found in the cuisines of Central Asia, Idel-Ural, and Mongolia. They may be thought of as cookies or biscuits, and since they are fried, they are sometimes compared to doughnuts.
Bugnes		Italy, France	
Buns		Nigeria	A fried dough ball snack similar to puff-puff, excluding the yeast.
Buñuelo		Spain	They typically consist of a simple, wheat-based yeast dough, often flavored with anise, that is thinly rolled, cut or shaped into individual pieces, then fried and finished off with a sweet topping. Buñuelos are first known to have been consumed among Spain's Morisco population. Its variants are widespread in former Spanish colonies.
Cascaron		Philippines	A variant of buñuelo from the Philippines made with ground glutinous rice and coconut milk. Usually eaten on skewers.
Çäkçäk		Tatarstan, Bashkortostan (Russia)	A sweet made from unleavened dough cut and rolled into hazelnut-sized balls, which are then deep-fried in oil.
Chakli (Murukku)		India	A South Indian snack of savory crunchy twists made from rice and urad dal flour. Murukku means twisted in the Tamil language. The town of Manapparai in Tamil Nadu is particularly known for its murukku. Murukku is made in many varieties as a traditional treat for festivals such as Diwali and Krishna Janmashtami. Murukku are often served on special occasions within Iyer (Tamil Brahmin) families.
Chapssal doughnut		Korea	Chewy, mildly sweet doughnuts made with glutinous rice flour and filled with sweetened red bean paste.
Chiacchiere		Italy	And lattughe in Lombardy
Cenci		Italy	And Donzelle in Tuscany- Chiacchiere (also called cenci - lit. 'rags') can be served with honey on top (or powdered sugar). Donzelle are stripes of fried bread dough, usually served with ham and mozzarella.
Chiburekki		Central Asia, Crimea, Russia	A fried turnover with a filling of ground or minced meat and onions. It is made with a single round piece of dough folded over the filling in a half-moon shape. A national dish of the Crimean Tatars, it is also popular throughout Central Asia, Russia, Ukraine, Turkey.
Churro		Spain	A thin cylinder of deep-fried pastry with a characteristic 'ridged' surface, due to being extruded through a star shaped hole. Churros are often served for breakfast or in local fiestas, matched with thick chocolate paste or white coffee. They are sometimes homemade or bought frozen to fry at home, but most are bought at cafes or from fixed or ambulatory churrerías.
Ciambelle		Italy	The doughnut equivalents (but they are never glazed)
Coxinha		Brazil	A croquette-like food with chicken filling.
Croquettes		Europe	Usually made of mashed potato.
Crostoli		Italy	Or crostui in Friuli Venezia Giulia
Curry bread		Japan	A curry-filled bread, dipped in panko and deep fried. It is usually pre-packaged and sold in convenience stores and bakeries.
Dutchie		Canada	Originated at Tim Horton's restaurants, is a square doughnut-like pastry topped with raisins and a sugary glaze
Elephant ears		United States	Fairground specialty, a large, flat round fried yeast dough, often covered in fruit or sugar, also called fried bread, fried dough, Whales Tails, tiger ears, pizza frita, frying saucers, doughboys. Similar to Canadian BeaverTails
Empaná		Curaçao, aruba, and bonaire (Caribbean)	Dough made from pre-cooked cornmeal, salt, sugar, aniseseed, butter, and water. It can have various fillings and is fried in oil. The filling can be ground meat, cheese, chicken, or tuna. Empaná's are sold at all places that cater to eaters on the go during the day as a filling snack but mostly in the morning as a fast breakfast item. At parties often smaller sized ones are served.
Falafel		Middle East	Deep-fried balls of ground chickpeas or fava bean. Very popular amongst vegans and vegetarians as an alternative to kebab, as it is served alongside hummus, wrapped in a lavash with fresh vegetables and various sauces, and usually available in kebab spots.
Fánk		Hungary	Sweet traditional food usually made for festive meals
Fartura		Portugal	Fairground specialty, fried in a spiral and then snipped into pieces that are powdered with sugar (see fartura)
Faworki		Poland	Also known as chrust, is a fried, crispy flat dough, sometimes twisted and sprinkled with confectioners' sugar.
Flancati		Slovenia	Rectangular, fried yeast dough topped with powdered sugar.
Frappe		Italy	And Sfrappole in Emilia-Romagna
Festival		Jamaica	Fried sweet dough
Fried pie		United States	Deep-fried pastry with filling, typically fruit.
Fish cracker		Southeast Asia	Deep-fried crackers made from starch and fish
Fried bread		United Kingdom	Triangular (usually) quarter or half slices of white bread fried in, traditionally, bacon dripping, and served on a plate with eggs, bacon, sausage, black pudding, beans and tomatoes as part of a traditional "Full English breakfast".
Fried Coke		United States	A creation made in the summer of 2006 which has proven very popular in Texas. Batter is mixed with Coca-Cola syrup and fried, after which it is topped with more Coke syrup or whipped cream, a cherry, etc.
Frittelle		Italy	
Fritter			Any kind of food coated in batter and deep fried. Although very similar to a doughnut it differs in the fact that it requires some base ingredient beyond the dough it is cooked with.
Fritule		Croatia	
Frybread		United States	Frybread is a Native American fried dough which may range from bread-like to donut-like depending on the region, as many tribes use different recipes.
Fry jack		Belize	Fry jacks are typically served at breakfast.
Funnel cake		United States	A creation which is made with fried sweet pastry where the pastry dough is extruded through a funnel into a pan of hot oil and allowed to "criss-cross" in the oil until the string of dough fills the bottom of the pan in a kind of tangled spaghetti-like arrangement, which is cooked as a cake rather than an individual snack. Funnel cakes are usually associated with carnivals, fairs, amusement parks, and seaside towns, much like cotton candy.
Gogoşi		Romania	Round or ring shaped, fried dough usually topped with powdered sugar or filled with fruit jam or chocolate cream.
Gorgoria		Philippines	A crunchy glazed fried dough cookie from the Philippines.
Haliva		Circassia (Russia)	A fried dough turnover filled with either potatoes or Circassian cheese.
Hirschhörner		Germany	A dough that uses Hirschhornsalz and Pottasche as leavening agents. The dough is rolled out thin, cut into diamonds. One corner is pulled through a slit cut in the middle of each diamond. They are then deep fried, dripped off and turned over in a bowl of granulated sugar until covered. A Northern German specialty prepared on New Year's Eve.
Hushpuppies		United States	Savory fried dough balls made from a heavy cornmeal batter
Jalebi		India, Pakistan, Bangladesh, Nepal	(Hindi: जलेबी, Urdu: جلیبی, Punjabi: ਜਲੇਬੀ, Telugu: జిలేబి), Jilapi (Bengali: জিলাপী), Jeri (Nepali: जेरी) This is a deep-fried sweet batter with rose water and saffron. Similar to Persian Zoolbiya.
Jersey wonders		Jersey	These are also known as Mèrveilles
Jin deui		China	A hollow fried pastry made of glutinous rice flour that is coated with sesame seeds and filled with a sweet filling.
Johnny Cake		US Virgin Islands	Unleavened, golden-sweet, semi-flattened, fluffy-fried bread made primarily of white flour.
Kabkab		Philippines	Deep-fried cassava wafers
Kachori		India	Dough balls filled with different kinds of savoury stuffings like de-skinned moong bean, de-skinned black gram, etc. along with salt, pepper, red chili powder and other spices.
Kachori		Pakistan	Doughnuts filled with ground beef or lamb and deep fried. Vegetarian ones often contain potatoes.
Karintō		Japan	
Khuushuur		Mongolia	A fried turnover with a filling of ground or minced meat (beef or mutton), onions or garlic, and other spices.
Kiping		Philippines	Leaf-shaped glutinous rice wafers
Kkwabaegi		Korea	Twisted doughnut from Korea
Khvorost		Russia	In Russian Хворост, crisp pastry made out of dough shaped into thin twisted ribbons, deep-fried and sprinkled with powdered sugar
Kleina		Iceland	(Plural Kleinur)
Klejne		Denmark	(Plural "Klejner")
Koeksister		South Africa	A traditional South African confectionery made of fried dough infused in syrup or honey. The name derives from the Dutch word koek, which generally means a wheat flour confectionery, also the origin of the American English word "cookie"
Krafne		Croatia	From German Krapfen
Krapfen		Austria, Bavaria and South Tyrol	Round, fried dough typically filled with apricot jam or vanilla cream and topped with powdered sugar.
Krhki flancati		Slovenia, Istria	Rectangular, cut and twisted fried dough topped with powdered sugar.
Krofi		Slovenia	Round, fried yeast dough filled with apricot or blueberry jam and topped with powdered sugar.
Kroštule		Croatia	Other local names: hruštule, hrustule, hrostule, krustavice, krustule (From Latin Crustulum – cookie, pastry).
Kumukunsi		Philippines	A deep fried rice cake made from rice flour, duck eggs, and sugar cooked into spiral shapes.
Lakhamari		Nepal	A fried sweet indigenous to Kathmandu Valley and surrounding areas.
Lángos		Hungary	
Laufabrauð		Iceland	A traditional kind of Icelandic bread that is most often eaten in the Christmas season. Originating from northern Iceland but now eaten throughout the entire country, it consists of round, very thin flat cakes with a diameter of about 15 to 20 cm (5.9 to 7.9 in), decorated with leaf-like, geometric patterns and fried briefly in hot fat or oil.
Lihapiirakka		Finland	A savoury doughnut (without a hole) filled with minced meat and rice.
Lokma or Loukoumades		Turkey, Greece	Somewhat like crisp doughnut holes, loukoumades (pronounced loo-koo-MA-thes) consist of deep-fried dough balls marinated in honey and cinnamon.
Lokot-lokot		Philippines	Deep-fried ground glutinous rice fried into noodle-like strings and usually rolled into cylinders
Lörtsy		Finland	A thin, half-moon shaped pastry originally from Savonlinna, eastern Finland. It is made with a variety of fillings; the most common ones are either a savory meat filling or a sweet apple filling.
Luchi		India (Eastern); Bangladesh	Made of wheat flour typical of Oriya, Assamese and Bengali cuisine, dough is made by mixing fine maida flour with water and spoonful of ghee, then divided in small balls, flattened by rolling-pin, individually deep-fried in cooking oil or ghee, 4-5 inches diameter, usually served with curries or gravies.
Luqmat al-qadi		Middle East	(لقمة القاضي) literally, judge's mouthful, this is a relative and etymological ancestor of the Greek Loukoumas. Also called sfingis (in Arabic) and lokma (Turkish, see below).
Ma Hua		China	A fried dough twist made by frying a bar of dough in peanut oil. Ma hua has a shiny and golden look.
Macheteada		Honduras	A fried dough from Honduras, made using flour tortillas. Can also be referred to as a "frita".
Malasada		Portugal	A fried dough from Sao Miguel Island, Azores, Portugal. Also popular in Hawaii and in Cape Cod, Massachusetts, where they are called "flippers".
Mandazi		East Africa	A fried bread (served with no glazing or frosting) that is popular in areas around the Swahili countries of Kenya and Tanzania. Often eaten along with breakfast or tea, or as a snack by itself.
Maruya (baduya, sinapot, jampok, etc.)		Philippines	Various types of fried banana fritters from the Philippines
Mеkitzi		Bulgaria	(Мекици)- similar to Funnel cake
Mutzen (food)		Germany	Fried sweet served for carnival
Mutzenmandeln		Germany	Shortcrust dough teardrops or almonds (as the name implies), deep fried and covered in confectioner's sugar. Originally from Southern Germany, now a common fair snack and offered by pastry stalls around Christmas throughout Germany.
Namak para		Pakistan, India	A crunchy savory snack of the Indian subcontinent, they're ribbon-like strips of pastry delicately seasoned with cumin seeds, carom seeds, and caraway seeds and deep fried in pure ghee (clarified butter).
Nonnevotte		Netherlands and Belgium	(Literally "nuns' bottoms"), eaten around the Carnival season in Limburg.
Okonomiyaki		Japan	Pan-fried savory pancake made from flour and various other ingredients
Okoy		Philippines	Fried savory fritter made from glutinous rice and shrimp, pumpkin, or sweet potato
Oliebollen / Smoutebollen		Netherlands and Belgium	Literally "oil balls" or "lard balls", referred to as "Dutch doughnuts" (or occasionally as 'Dutch Donuts'). Contain pieces of apple or dried fruit like raisins, traditionally eaten around New Year.
Ox-tongue pastry		China	An elliptical-shaped dough that resembles an ox tongue. They are sweet in taste and the texture is chewy and fine.
Pączki		Poland	Springy doughnuts filled with jam, often coated with granulated or powdered sugar. See also Ponchiki (Russian, Пончики or pyshki (пышки)) or Ponichki (Bulgarian, Понички).
Pakora		India, Pakistan	Also called bhajji in India, Telugu: పకోడి, this is a deep-fried vegetable fritters in a gram flour batter. In Pakistan, pakoras filled with ground beef are also common.
Pampushky		Ukraine	(Пампушки)
Panikeke		Samoa	Also called panikeke lapotopoto, this is a deep fried sweetened fritter. Panikeke are often served with butter or jam.
Panyalam		Philippines	A fried rice cake or pancake from the Philippines made with ground glutinous rice, sugar, and coconut milk
Papadum (Papar)		India	Also called papad, papar, etc., this is a fried wafer made from a dough made of lentils (often urad dal) and spices. When fried as a dough or with sufficient moisture, it is called pappaṭam. When fried dry, it is called appal am.
Papadum		Pakistan	A fried wafer made of rice flour and often sprinkled with spices eaten as a snack.
Paraoa Parai		New Zealand	Fried wheat dough, sometimes with fermented potato (rewena) leavening. Often served with butter and golden syrup.
Paratha		Bangladesh, India, Pakistan	Also called parantha, porota, etc., this is a pan-fried flatbread, often stuffed with vegetables, cheese, or ground meat. In Pakistan, parathas stuffed with either potatoes, radishes or ground meat are popular and a common breakfast dish. Layered parathas or "lachah/tehdaar" parathas are often used as a wrap for 'kebab rolls'.
Pastechi		Curaçao, Aruba, and Bonaire (Caribbean)	Pastry made from white flower, baking powder, salt, sugar, water, and lard or butter. It can have various fillings and is traditionally fried in oil, but for lesser fat content and more healthy version it can be baked in the oven. The filling is usually ground meat or cheese, but chicken, tuna and saltfish (bakiou) are also very popular. On Aruba more variations for the fillings are prepared, like corned beef, curry chicken, ham & cheese, conch meat. Pastechi's are sold at all places that cater to eaters on the go during the day as a filling snack but mostly in the morning as a fast breakfast item. At parties often smaller sized ones are served.
Pastel		Brazil	A thin pastry envelope containing minced meat, catupiry and chicken, shrimp or another filling and then deep-fried.
Pasztecik szczeciński		Poland	Machine-produced deep-fried yeast dough stuffed with meat or vegetarian filling
Peremech or belyash		Tatarstan, Bashkortostan (Russia)	Peremech (Tatar: пәрәмәч) is a fried bun made of either leavened or unleavened dough and stuffed with minced meat. It usually has a hole in the middle. A similar dish is called belyash (Russian: беляш) in Russian.
Pestiños		Spain	A piece of dough, deep-fried in olive oil and glazed with honey or cinnamon sugar.
Petulla		Albania	Dough with yeast. Commonly served with feta cheese and/or honey by Albanians and the Albanian diaspora.
Picarones		Peru	A sweet, ring-shaped pumpkin-based fritter; often served with a molasses syrup.
Pinakufu		Philippines	A dense oval-shaped variant of cascaron from the Philippines made with ground glutinous rice and coconut milk
Pirozhki, pyrizhki		Bulgaria, Russia, Ukraine	Pirozhki (Russian: пирожки) or pyrizhki (Ukrainian: пирiжки) are traditional Eastern European baked or fried buns stuffed with a variety of fillings.
Polsterzipf		Austria	Marmalade-filled sweet
Porras		Spain	Often served for breakfast, especially in Madrid).
Prawn cracker (keropok, kropek, krupuk, etc.)		Southeast Asia	Deep-fried crackers made from starch and prawn
Priganice		Montenegro	Fritters or flat doughnuts served with honey, cheese, or jam.
Puff-puff		Nigeria	Also a West African dish, is a fried sweet dough (with no glazing or frosting) made from flour, sugar, yeast, and vanilla extract, typically served as an appetizer when entertaining guest, or bought as a snack from a street vendor.
Puftaloon		Australia	Made from flour, salt, butter, milk, traditionally fried in animal fat, popular with children in winter.
Puri		India, Bangladesh, Nepal	Unleavened, made of wheat flour (refined, whole-wheat, or coarse), dough of flour and salt rolled into small circle or bigger and cut into small circles, deep fried in ghee or vegetable oil, puffs up in all directions like a round ball from steam inside. Variations include the North Indian bhatoora (Hindi: भटूरा bhaṭūrā) and the Bengali luchi (Bengali: লুচি)
Poori		Pakistan	Unleavened, made of all-purpose flour and deep-fried bread. It is served in breakfast with chickpeas and semolina halwa as a part of 'halwa poori'.
Papri		India	Crisp fried dough wafers made from refined white flour and oil. In papri chaat, the papris are served with boiled potatoes, boiled chick peas, chilis, yogurt and tamarind chutney and topped with chaat masala and sev.
Pilipit		Philippines	Twisted doughnut from the Philippines, similar to shakoy but has a hard crunchy texture and is smaller
Pitulici		Macedonia	Fritter
Quarkbällchen		Germany	Quark is included in the batter, coated in granulated sugar after frying
Rissole		France	Minced meat or fish, enclosed in pastry and deep fried.
Rosette		Scandinavia	Ornate irons are dipped into batter and then dropped into hot oil. The pastry quickly separates from the iron, which is removed. The rosettes are then fried to a light brown, removed from the oil, and sprinkled with powdered sugar.
Rollkuchen		Europe (Mennonite)	Meaning "rolled cake," they are named for their specific shape, made from rectangles of dough cut down the middle, with one end pushed through the hole to create a twisty shape. Often served alongside watermelon or topped with sugar, jam, honey, or syrup.
Rosquillas		Spain	
Salukara		Philippines	Rice pancake fried in a lard-greased pan
Samosa		India, Pakistan	A South Asian deep-fried savory pastry. Includes variants such as mitha samosa, shingara, etc.
Sangza, sanzi		China	Deep-fried noodles often eaten for holidays, popular with the Uyghurs.
Sata andagi		Japan (Okinawa)	A sweet, ball-shaped snack, similar to the doughnut, native to the Okinawa Prefecture.
Schenkele		Switzerland, Alsace	Small fritter made from ground nuts eaten around Christmas and Fasnacht, sometimes additionally flavored with Kirsch and candied peel.
Schmalzkuchen or Schmalzgreben		Germany	Literally "lard cake". Rolled out yeast dough cut into small rhombuses that become pillows during frying. Served warm with powdered sugar. Usually found on Christmas markets.
Schneeballen		Germany	Literally "snowballs". Dough cut into strips, formed into a ball and fried then covered in toppings; popular in Rothenburg.
Sfenj		Morocco, Algeria	Fritter
Shakoy		Philippines	Twisted doughnut from the Philippines made with regular flour or rice flour
Shuangbaotai		Taiwan	A sweet fried dough food with cavernous holes in the food and a crisp outside. They are made by sticking two small pieces of dough together and frying them, causing them to separate slightly while still connected, thus resembling conjoined twins, for which the food is named.
Shelpek		Kazakhstan, and other Central Asia	A deep-fried flatbread commonly consumed all over Kazakhstan, and other Central Asia.
Shing-a-ling		Philippines	Deep-fried wheat flour sticks. Traditionally made with dried egg noodles.
Smultring		Norway	Literally "lard ring", this is similar to a doughnut but smaller, without glacing or filling, and flavored with cardamom.
Sopaipilla		United States, Argentina, Chile, Peru, Uruguay	A fried dough side dish or dessert popular among Mexican-Americans in the Southwest. Sopaipillas puff with air when fried, the finished product resembling a pillow. They are often served with honey, but may also be sprinkled with a cinnamon and sugar mixture. Sopaipillas are characteristic of Tex-Mex or New Mexican cuisine.
Struffoli		Italy	A dessert of Neapolitan origin
Sufganiyah		Israel (Jewish)	Typically sold exclusively during the holiday of Hanukkah. Soft, sweet, and traditionally filled with strawberry jam; though modern varieties include chocolate, caramel or vanilla custard, or other types of jam. Traditionally topped with powdered sugar, with Israeli bakers now experimenting with a wide variety of sweet toppings, including coconut or even fresh fruit.
Tamriyeh		The Levant	Filo pastry enveloping semolina pudding and dusted with powdered sugar
Telebhaja (Bengali fritters)		Bengal	
Teler pitha, or Handesh		Bengal, Bangladesh	
Tenkasu		Japan	Often produced as byproduct of Tempura cooking, because bits of fried batter are easily made while deep frying, but they are also produced at factories by deep frying trickling batter.
Timbit		Canada	Doughnut holes sold in many different flavors, originating at Tim Hortons and seen as somewhat iconic in Canada.
Toutin or Touton		Canada	Fried bits of leftover bread dough, often served with molasses. Most popular on Newfoundland.
Tulumba		Turkey, Balkans	Traditional treat consisting of fried batter soaked in syrup. Similar to bamiyeh in Iranian cuisine.
Urrädla		Germany	A fried dough made in Upper Franconia and served sprinkled with powdered sugar. It is a specialty of Franconian Switzerland, in the area around Forchheim. Also called Braada (breite) Küchla.
Uštipci		Serbia	
Vada		India	Also called vara, bara, etc., this is lentil cakes shaped into patties or donut shapes
Verhuny		Ukraine	(Вергуни) or Khvorost (хворост), literally angel wings
Vetkoek		South Africa	Pronounced FET-kook, this is a fried bread dough traditional to Afrikaner and also called magwenya by the indigenous population. It is typically rolled into a ball or hot dog bun shape.
Youtiao		China	Literally "oil strip", also known as fried breadstick. They are savory dough fritters with an oily taste, a crispy outside texture, and a chewy inside texture with large holes. Commonly served for breakfast with congee or soy milk.
Žagarėliai		Lithuania	"Žagarėliai" and "Skruzdėlynas" are the equivalents of Angel Wings in Lithuania. Žagarėliai (or "small sticks" in English) are delicate pastry dough cookies, deep fried in fat. It is best to use lard or oil for deep frying these cookies. Skruzdėlynas translates as "anthill" in English and is layers of fried dough strips, covered in honey and topped with poppy seeds. It is a typical dessert served during Lithuanian family celebrations.
Zalabiyeh		Arab world	Spiral sweet soaked in syrup
Zeppole		Italy	Commonly light-weight, deep-fried dough balls about 2 inches (5.1 cm) in diameter, these doughnuts or fritters are usually topped with powdered sugar and may be filled with custard, jelly, cannoli-style pastry cream or a butter-and-honey mixture.
Znoud el-sit		Arab world	Rolls of baklava-sheets enveloping qishta that are coated in a syrup called qatir

Fried dough foods

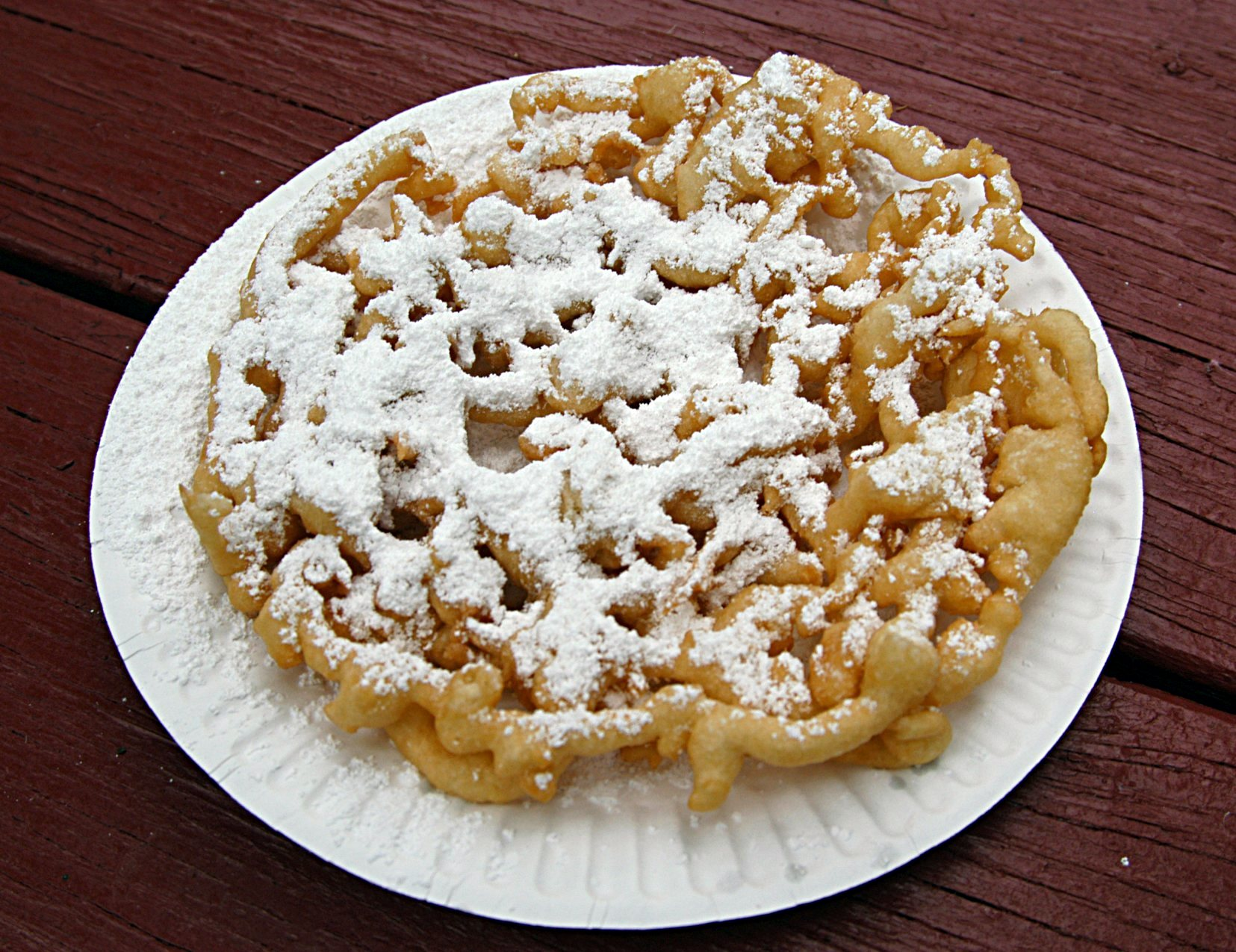
Funnel cake

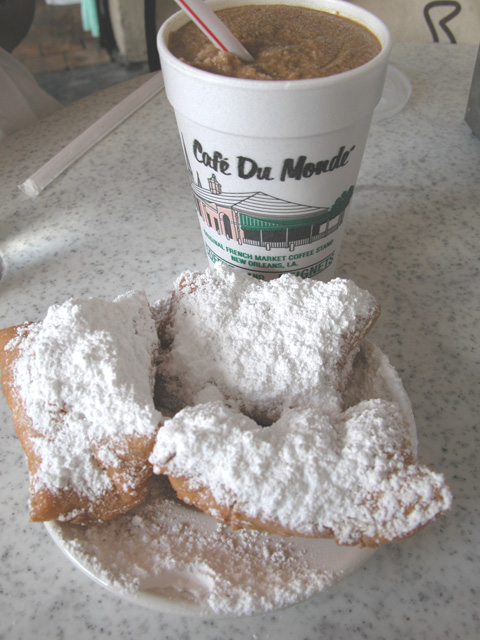
American-style beignets with powdered sugar

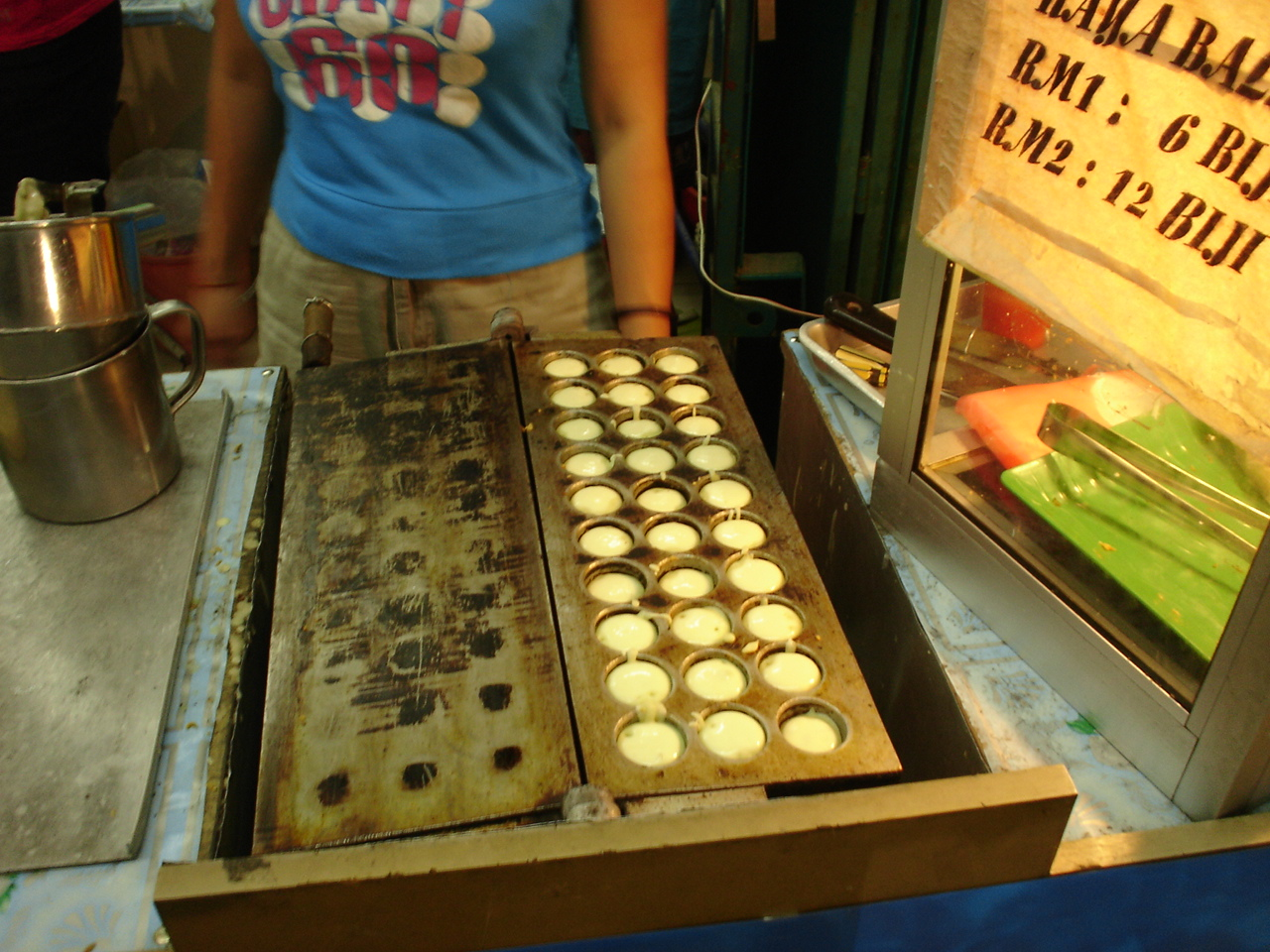
Kaya balls in tray

== See also ==
- Fried bread
- Fried dough
- List of deep fried foods
- List of desserts
- List of doughnut varieties
- List of pastries
