= Funnel cake =

Deep-fried batter

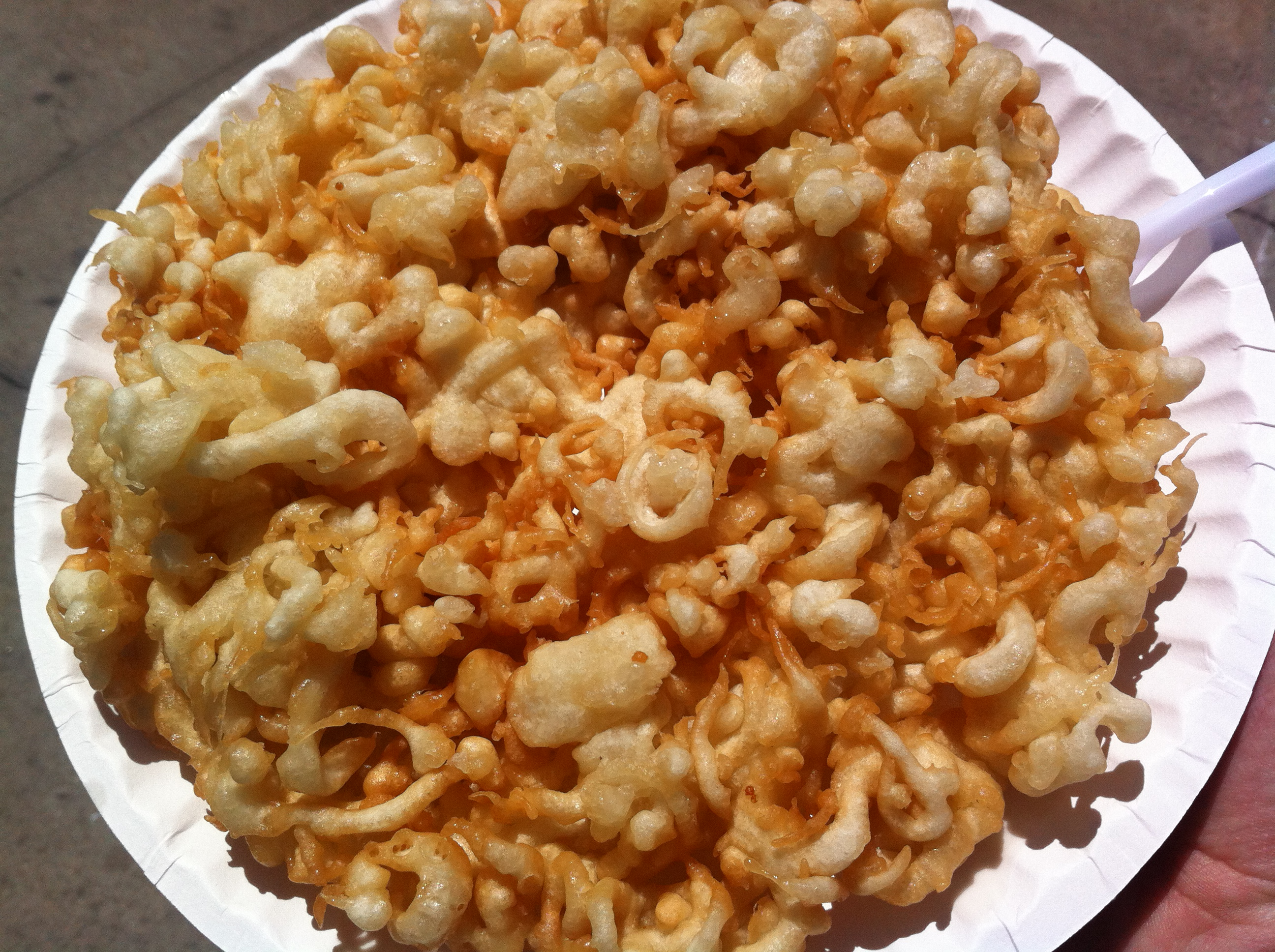
- Funnel cake with no toppings
- Alternative names: Funnel fries, carnival cake
- Type: Doughnut
- Place of origin: United States
- Region or state: Pennsylvania
- Main ingredients: Batter, cooking oil

Funnel cake (Pennsylvania German: Drechderkuche) is a sweet food, made by deep-frying batter. Versions are popular in many countries. In North America, it is found mainly at carnivals and amusement parks.

== History ==
The concept of the funnel cake dates back to the early medieval Persian and Arab world as zalabiyeh, where similar yeast-risen dishes were first prepared, and later spread to Europe. Pennsylvania Dutch immigrants brought the yeast dish, known as drechderkuche, to America, and around 1879, they developed the baking powder version along with its new name, funnel cake.

== Preparation ==
Funnel cakes are made by pouring batter into hot cooking oil in a circular pattern and deep frying the overlapping mass until golden-brown. The batter is commonly poured through a funnel, creating its texture and giving it its name. When made at concession stands, a pitcher with an integral funnel spout is employed. Alton Brown recommends they be made with choux pastry, which expands from steam produced by its high water content.

Funnel cakes are typically served plain with powdered sugar but can also be served with jam/jelly, cinnamon, chocolate, fresh fruit, or other toppings.[

== Cultural variations ==
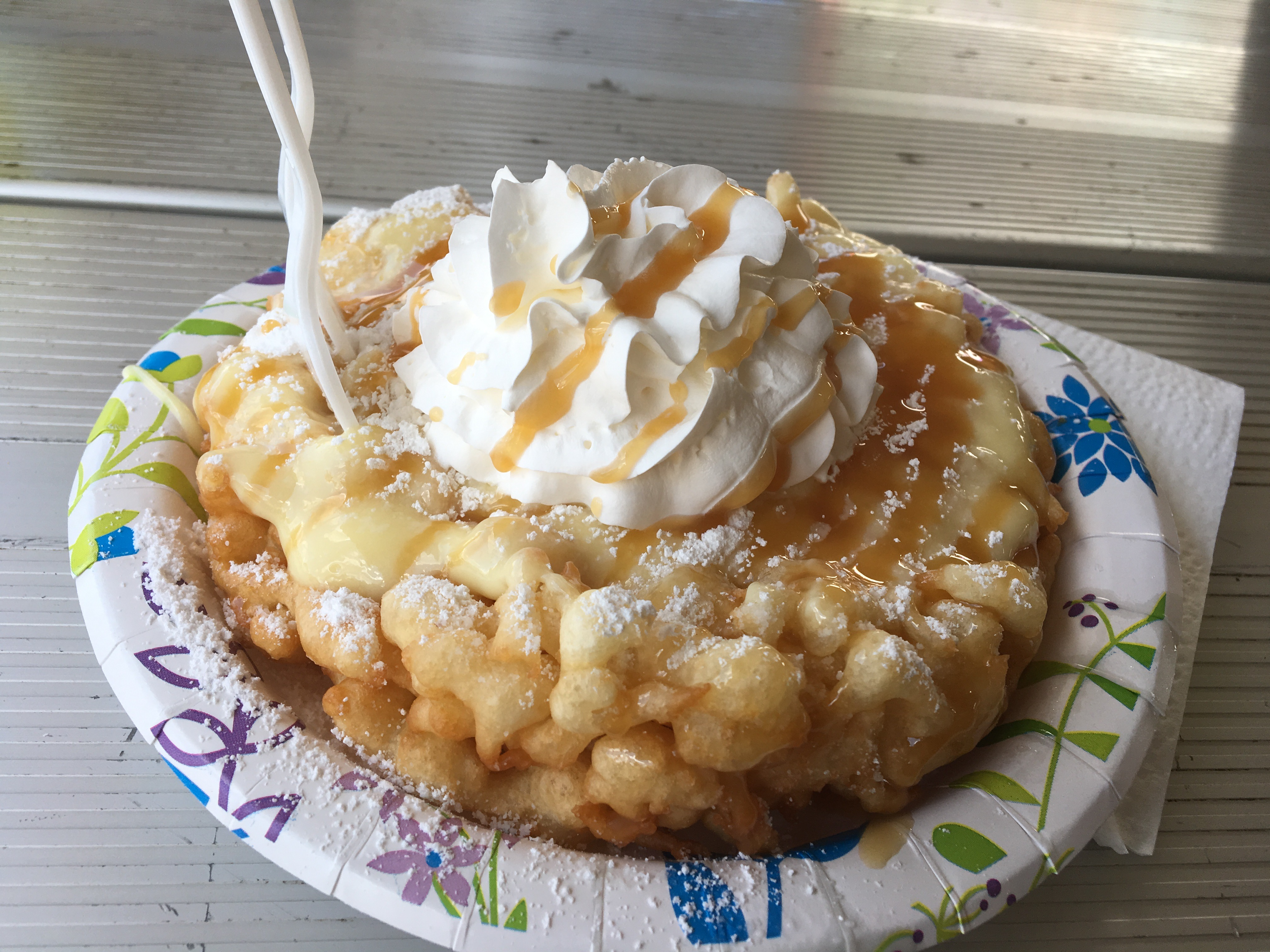
A funnel cake topped with custard and whipped cream

=== Europe ===
In south German cuisine, the equivalent is called Strauben or Strieble and is made and served similarly. In Finnish cuisine, the analogous tippaleipä (literally droplet bread) is traditionally served at May Day (Vappu) celebrations, alongside sima. In Lithuania, it is called skruzdėlynas, which literally translates to "ant nest". It is normally made in early spring to empty last year's honey stock and make more space for the new one, and it is also made at the first harvest of honey. The Armenian equivalent mrjnabujn (hy:Մրջնաբույն (տորթ)) also translates to "ant nest".

=== Asia ===
In the Indian subcontinent, a similar dessert, with a crystallized sugary exterior coating, is called jalebi. In Iran, this is known as zulbia and is a popular dessert. These differ from funnel cake in using no baking powder, which results in a crunchy and somewhat chewy texture.

Kumukunsi is another similar native doughnut from the Maguindanao people in the Philippines. It is made with rice flour, duck eggs, and sugar that is molded into rope-like strands and then fried in a loose spiral. They have the taste and consistency of creamy pancakes.

=== United States ===
In the U.S., funnel cakes were originally associated with the Pennsylvania Dutch Country. It is one of the first North American fried foods, which is associated with the Pennsylvania Dutch, German immigrants who emigrated to Pennsylvania in the 17th and 18th centuries. Today, it is a staple dish that can be found at amusement parks and fairs all over the country. The name "funnel" later came from the technique used to make the cakes, in which the pancake-like batter is poured into hot oil through a funnel.

== See also ==
- List of doughnut varieties
- List of fried dough foods
- List of regional dishes of the United States
- Pennsylvania Dutch cuisine
