= Daral (food) =

Filipino dessert crêpe

- Alternative names: Darar, balolon
- Type: Rice cake
- Place of origin: The Philippines
- Region or state: Sulu Archipelago, Zamboanga

Daral, also known as darar, is a Filipino dessert crêpe rolled into a cylinder and filled with sweetened coconut meat (hinti). It originates from the Tausug people of the Philippines. It is also known as balolon (literally "wrapped") among the Maranao people. The crêpe wrapper is similar to the lumpia wrapper, except that it uses batter made from unsweetened ground glutinous rice with coconut milk (galapong). The wrap is sometimes flavored with pandan leaves. However, modern versions can use flour.

== See also ==
- Bukayo
- Dadar gulung
- Lokot-lokot
- Panyalam
- Salukara
- Turon
