= Fritelli =

Corsican doughnuts or fritters

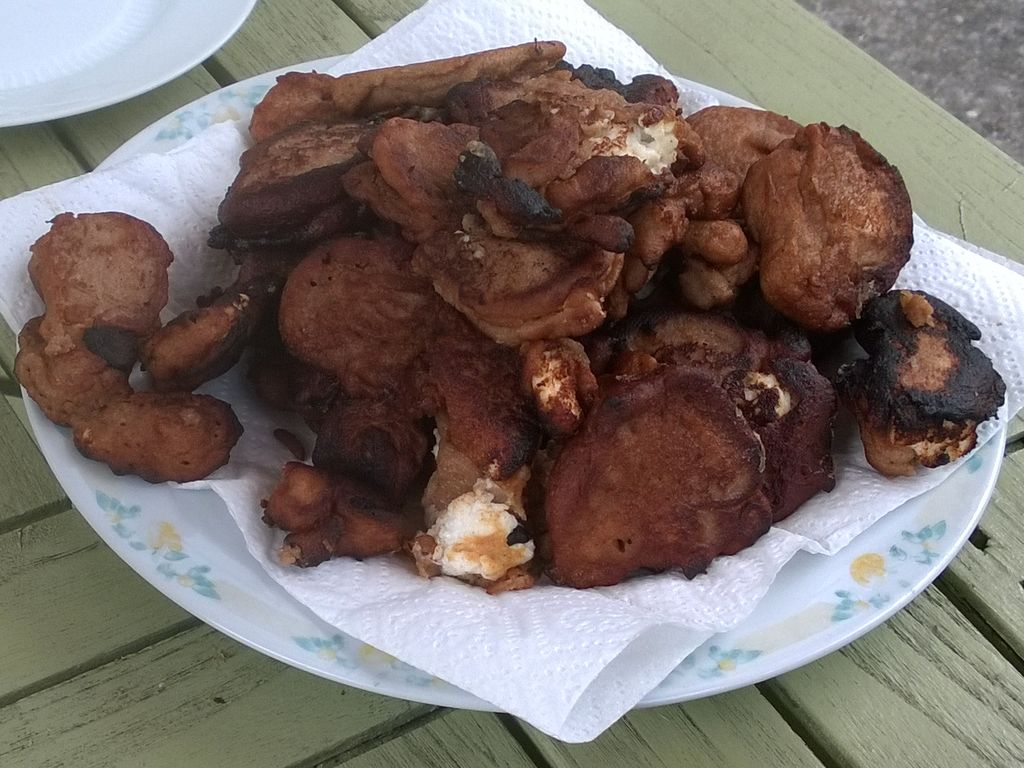
- Fritelli castagnini
- Type: Doughnut or fritter
- Place of origin: France
- Region or state: Corsica
- Main ingredients: wheat flour or Chestnut flour

Fritelli (singular Fritellu), also Fritelle (singular Fritella) are Corsican doughnuts or fritters made from fried wheat or chestnut flour (Fritelle castagnine). A preparation of the fritters is referred to as Fritelli di Casgiu Frescu with fresh cheese (or Brocciu) or Fritelli di Salciccia with sausage.

According to a 1880 Scribners monthly account, the chestnuts were collected from those that had fallen (and beating the trees to knock them down was discouraged). The nuts were then taken to huts and placed six inches deep in trays where they were slow-cooked with green wood fires until hard and dry. In this state they could be kept for years and were milled into flour "like corn or wheat", which was then made into fritelli or other dishes such as "pulenta" (polenta), necci, pattoni, castagnacciu and cialdi.

== See also ==
- List of fried dough
- List of doughnut varieties
- Bambalouni

== Sources ==
- Schapira, Christiane (1994). La bonne cuisine corse (in French). Paris: Solar. ISBN 2263001778.
- Silvani, Paul (1991). Cuisine corse d'antan - Cucina corsa di prima (in French). Ajaccio: La marge. ISBN 2865230937.
