= Bukayo =

Filipino coconut dessert

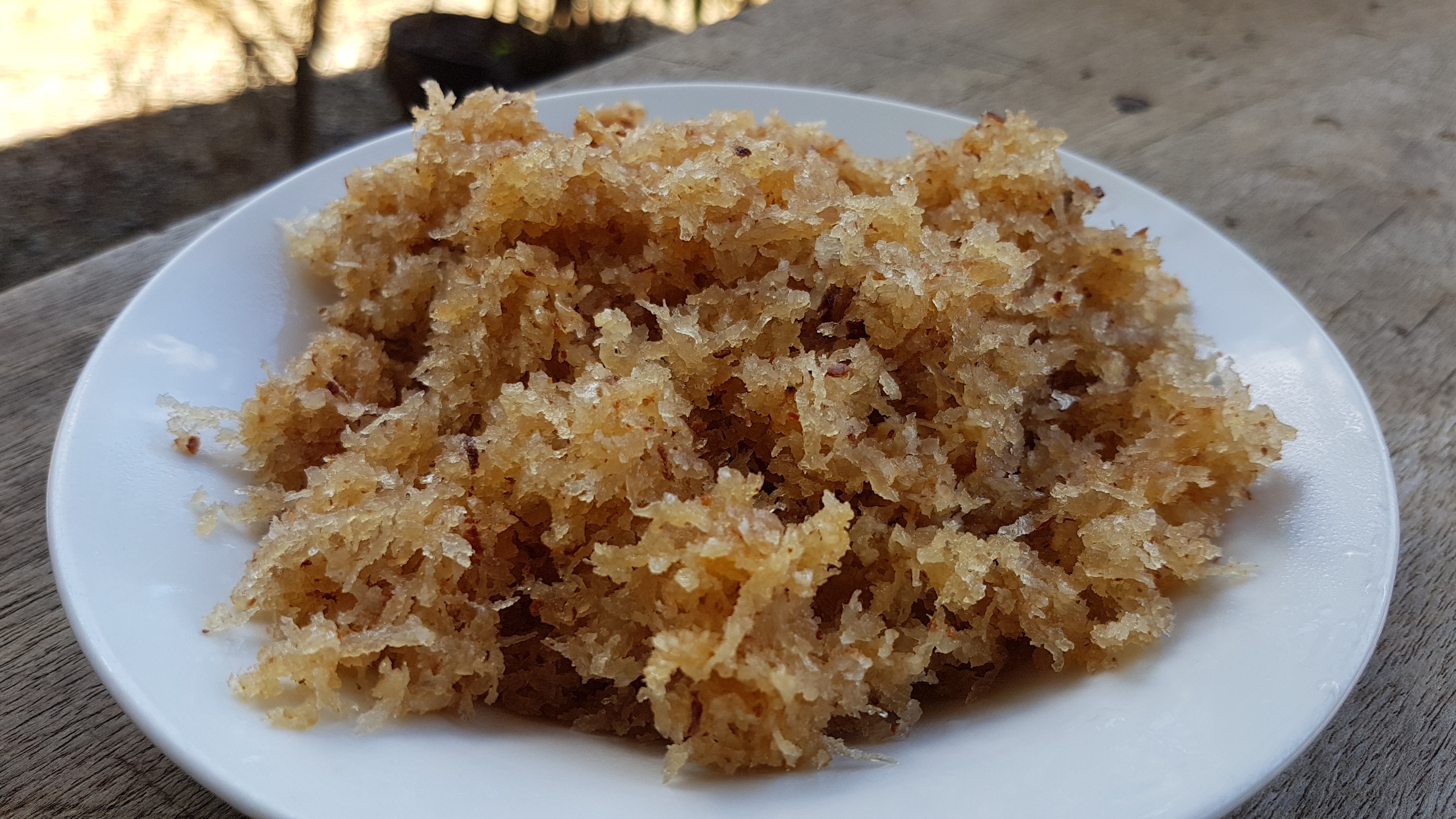
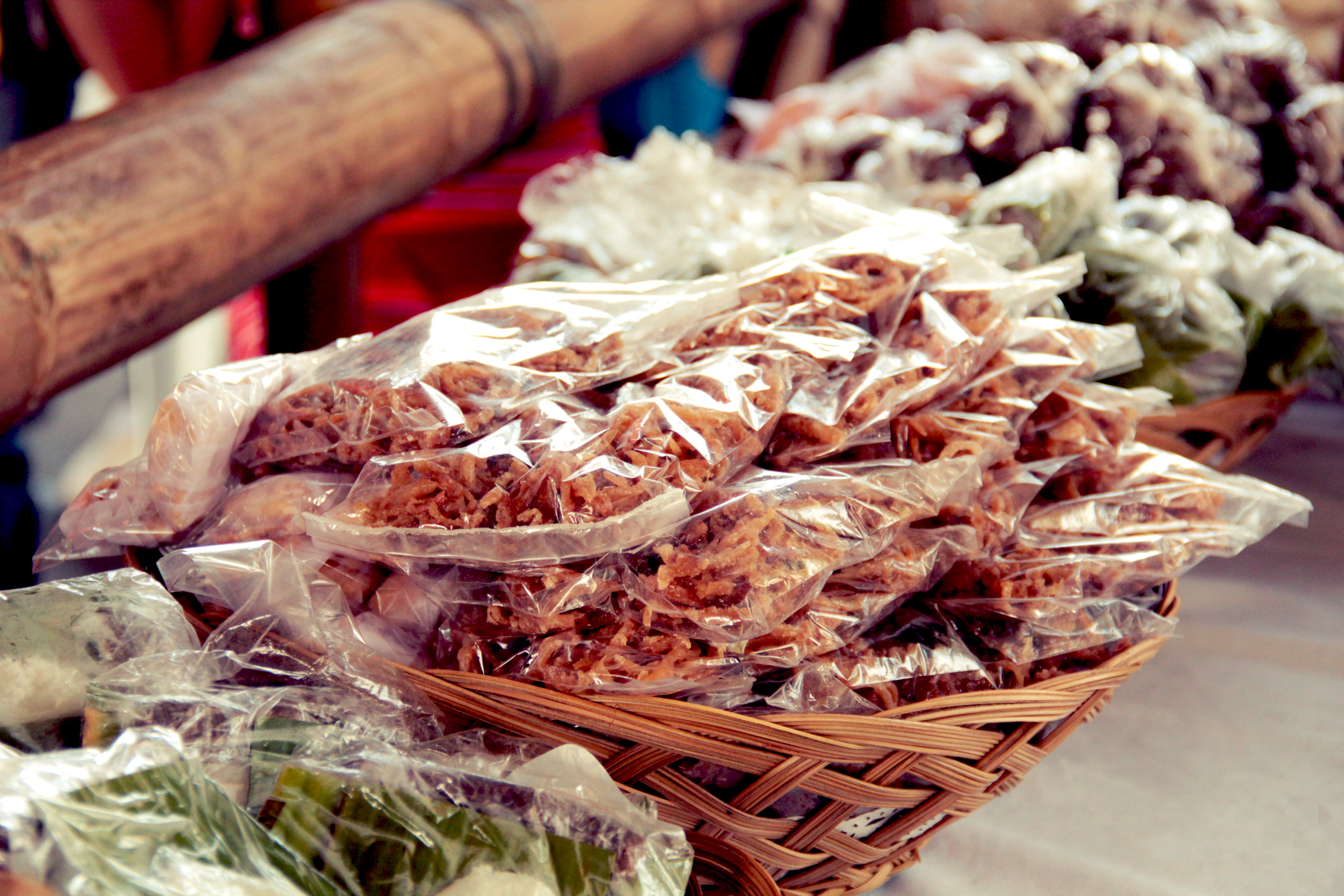
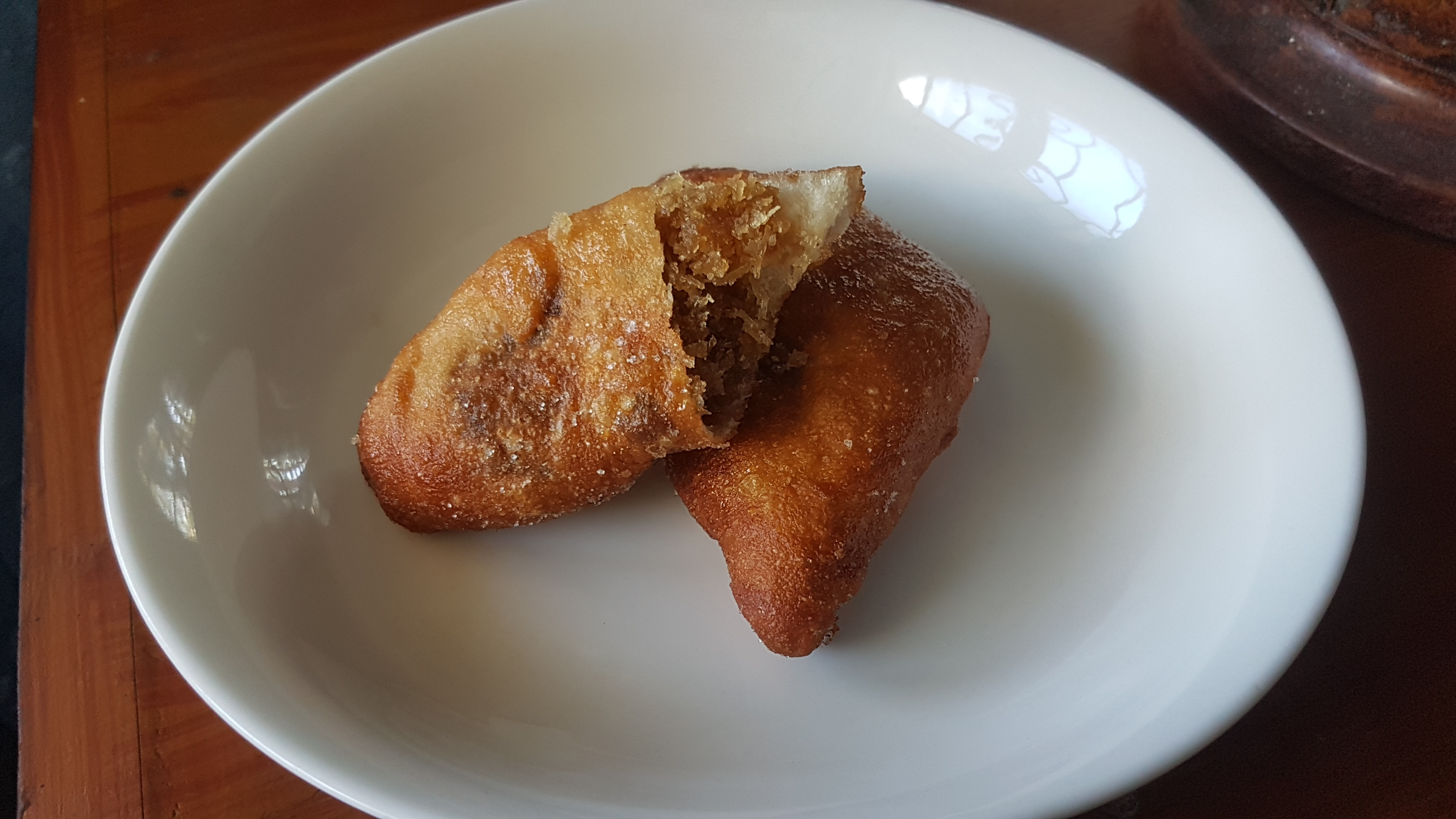
- Top: Freshly-made bukayo; Center: Packaged bukayo in a market in Silay; Bottom: Bitsu-bitsu doughnut with bukayo filling
- Alternative names: Bucaio, bucayo, bokayo, bukayu, bukhayo, conserua de coco
- Type: Dessert
- Place of origin: Philippines
- Main ingredients: Gelatinous coconut, water, sugar or brown sugar
- Variations: Bocarillo

Bukayo is a Filipino dessert made from sweetened coconut strips. It is traditionally made by simmering strips or shredded bits of young, gelatinous coconut (buko) in water and sinuklob, which is sugarcane muscovado melted into a chewy caramel-like consistency. Dryer versions of bukayo with a crumbly texture are known as bocarillo. Bukayo can be eaten on its own, usually rolled into little balls. It can also be used as a garnish and filling for other desserts, most notably for pan de coco, moche, and sinudlan empanada.

Bukayo is also spelled as bucaio, bucayo, bokayo, bukhayo, or bukayu in other regions. During the Spanish rule of the Philippines, it was known as conserva de coco ("coconut preserve") in Spanish. It is also known as hinti in Tausug.

Peanut brittle in the Philippines is also sometimes locally known as bukayo mani.

== See also ==
- Daral (food)
