= Shing-a-ling (food) =

Filipino snack

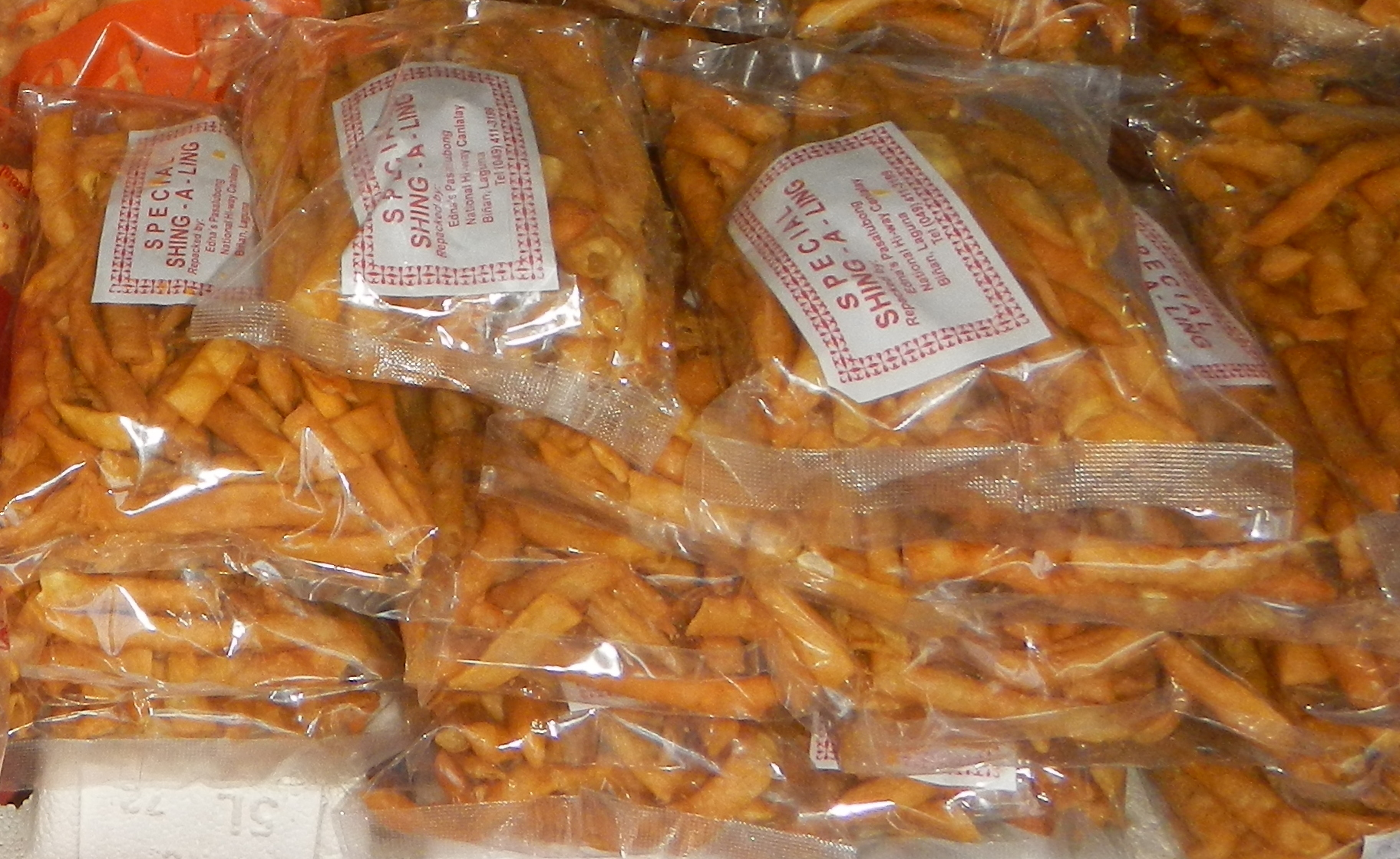
- Alternative names: shingaling
- Type: Snack
- Place of origin: Philippines

Shing-a-ling is a Filipino snack made from dried thick egg noodles locally known as pancit miki that is deep-fried and dusted with garlic, chili, and beef powder. It can also be eaten as is with a vinegar-based dip, or dusted in sugar. Some commercial versions directly fry wheat dough. It has a distinctive shape that resembles green beans.

== See also ==
- Kumukunsi
- Lokot-lokot
