= Sfenj =

Maghrebi fried doughnut rings

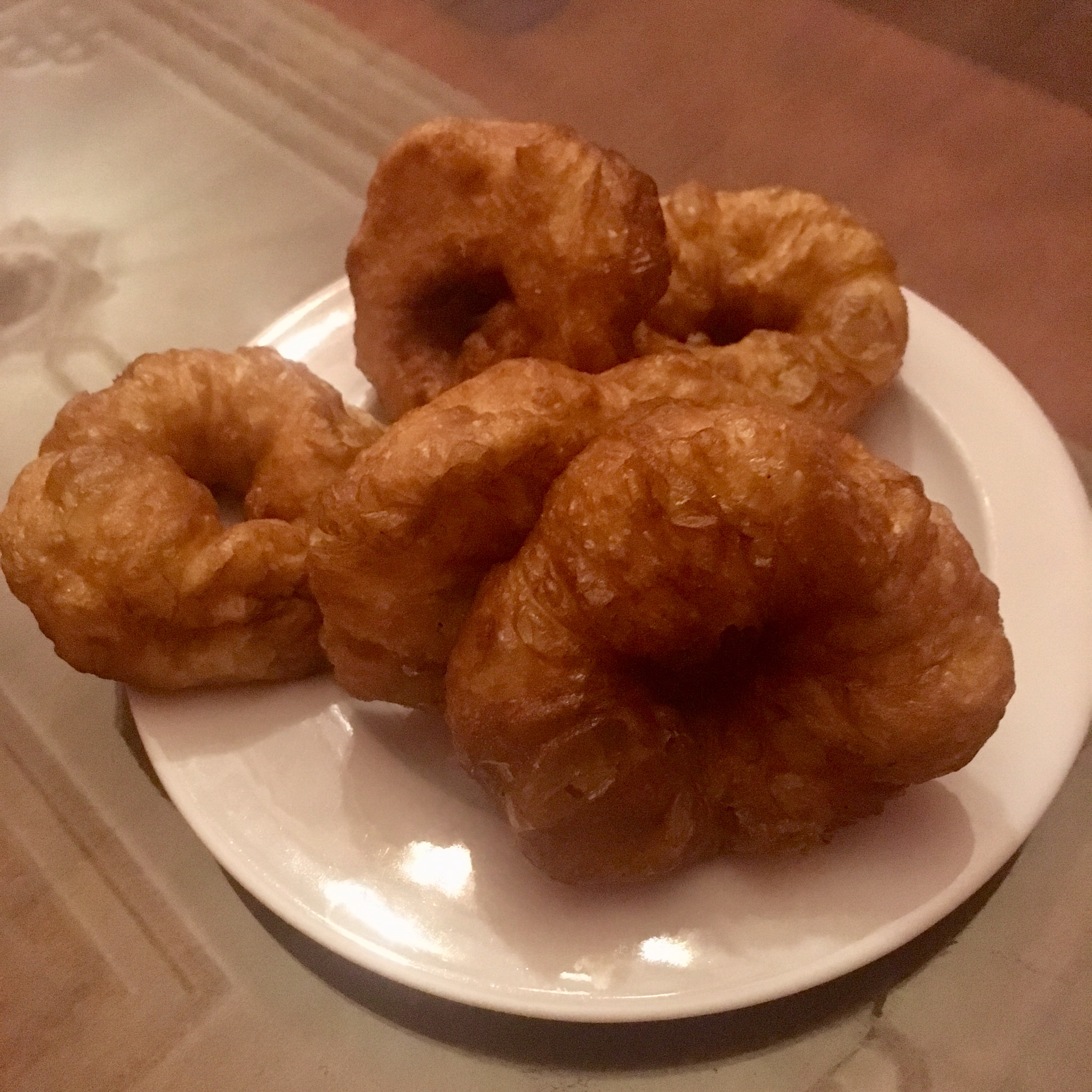
- Alternative names: Bambalouni, khfaf, sfinz
- Type: Doughnut
- Place of origin: Al-Andalus
- Main ingredients: Flour, water, sugar, yeast and salt
- Food energy (per serving): 137 kcal (570 kJ)
Nutritional value
(per serving)
- Protein: 2 g
- Fat: 8 g
- Carbohydrate: 14 g

Sfenj (from the Arabic word Arabic: سفنج, romanized: Safanj, meaning sponge) is a Maghrebi doughnut: a light, spongy ring of dough fried in oil. Sfenj is eaten plain, sprinkled with sugar, or soaked in honey. It is a well-known dish in the Maghreb and is traditionally made and sold early in the morning for breakfast or in the late afternoon accompanied by tea—usually Maghrebi mint tea—or coffee.

The term Sfenj is used in Algeria and other parts of the Maghreb. It is called Sfenz in Libya and Maghrebi Judeo-Arabic dialects. In Morocco, the term Sfenj is used, also sometimes nicknamed in the literature Moroccan doughnuts. It is also called Khfaf or ftayr in Algeria, and is sometimes also dubbed as the Algerian doughnut.

== History ==
Sfenj originated in Al-Andalus (Moorish Spain). According to legend, Sfenj was created by mistake, when a baker accidentally dropped a ball of dough into a pan of hot oil. Sfenj was an important part of Andalusi culture, whose role was best summarised by a verse from a contemporary poet: "The Sfenj bakers are worth as much as kings" ("سفاجين تحسبهم ملوكا").

It is unclear how Sfenj first spread to the Maghreb, although it is said to have been well known to the Marinid Dynasty, which ruled Morocco from 1270 to 1465. It spread to France during the 13th century, where it inspired beignets. Sfenj was only sweetened with sugar starting in the 18th century, even though sugarcane has been widely cultivated in the Arab world since the 8th century. Before that, they were sweetened with honey or syrup, or simply served plain.

Although Sfenj comes from Al-Andalus, most bakers and sellers of Sfenj in the Maghreb have traditionally been Amazigh (Berbers). The nomadic Amazigh are thought to have spread Sfenj throughout the Maghreb, aided in that by merchants who traveled across the region.

The chef Mustafa an-Nakīr remarks that head meat with Sfenj was a popular breakfast in Marrakesh in his grandparents' time.

Dedicated Sfenj bakers, called sufnāj (سفناج), soon appeared throughout the Maghreb, attesting to the dessert's popularity. Sufnājeen (plural of sufnāj) became central figures in the social life of Maghrebi neighborhoods, as they interacted with almost every household in their community every morning, and working as a sufnāj was considered a respectable career. In a traditional Sfenj bakery, the sufnāj (and their large circular fryer) sit on an elevated platform, raised slightly above the rest of the bakery, which is already raised more than a meter off the ground. Customers surround this platform and try to catch the sufnāj's attention to place their orders by raising their hand at him or her and shouting.

Traditional sufnājeen are quickly going extinct in the modern Maghreb, as a result of the rise of industrial bakeries and the proliferation of Sfenj recipes over the Internet blogosphere.

== Varieties ==
In addition to ordinary Sfenj, there are two special varieties of Sfenj, not counting the different toppings (honey, syrup, and sugar) Sfenj can have:

- Sfenj matifiyya (السفنج المطفية), Sfenj that is pounded flat and then fried a second time
- Sfenj matifiyya bil-baydh (السفنجة المطفية بالبيض), Sfenj matifiyya with an egg added before refrying

=== Libya ===
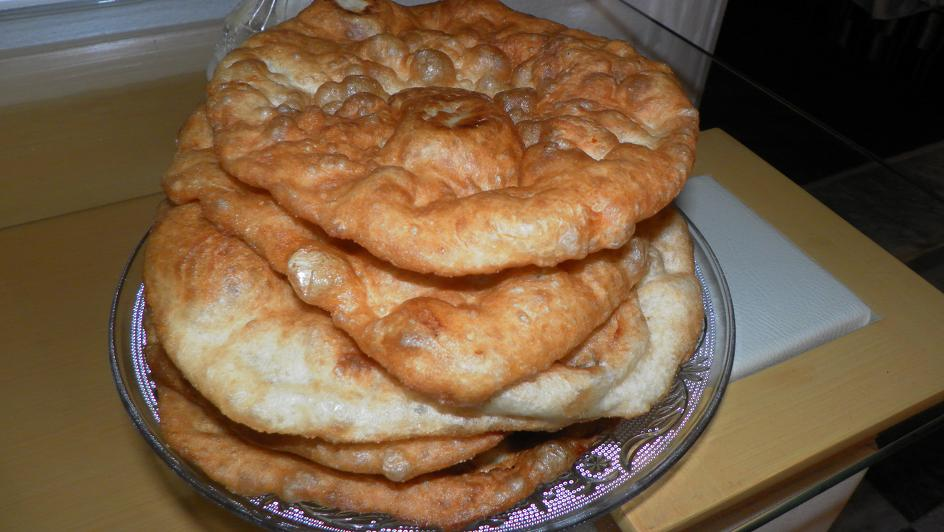
Libyan Sfenj

In Libya Sfenj is eaten sprinkled with sugar or soaked in honey or date molasses. It can be eaten for Friday breakfast or with afternoon tea. Though it is eaten year-round, it is especially popular during the winter months and around Ramadan and Eid al-Fitr. It is the Libyan version of the Sfenj doughnuts that are widely popular across the other countries of the Maghreb.

Sfenj can also be prepared with a fried egg in the center. The egg can be runny or hard, and is often topped with cheese.

=== Israel ===
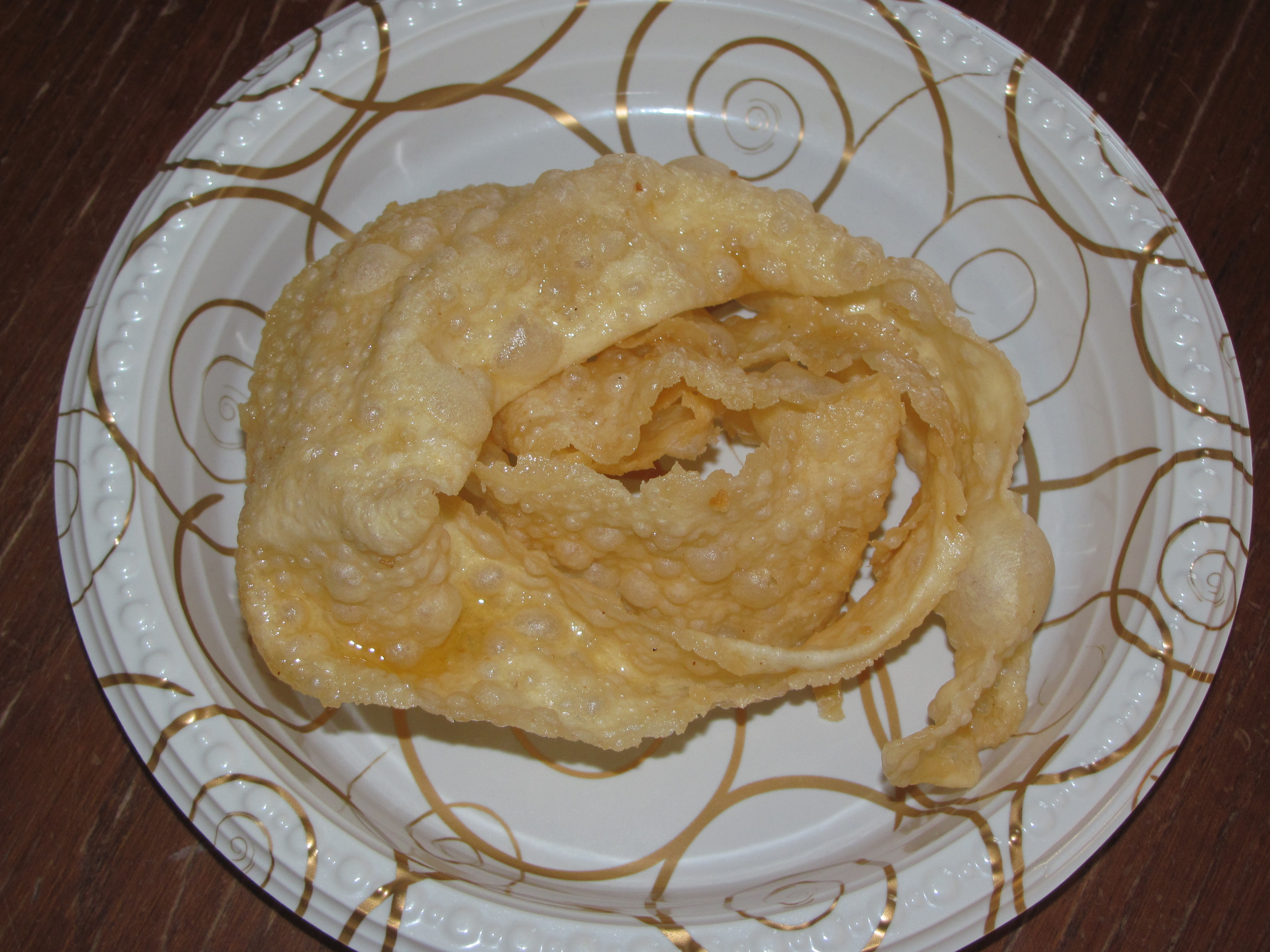
Homemade Sfenj coated with honey

Sfenj (Hebrew: סְפינְג', romanized: Sfinj) entered Israeli culture before 1948, as Maghrebi Jews brought it with them when they immigrated to the Land of Israel. Sfenj quickly became popular for Hanukkah, as it is easy to prepare at home.

== Idiomatic use ==
Sfenj's importance to Moroccan culture is reflected in several idioms in Moroccan Arabic, including:

- "Give someone a Sfenj and he'll say it's ugly" (صاب سفنجة وقال عوجة), meaning "do not judge a book by its cover" or "do not bite the hand that feeds you."
- "As if hitting a dog with a Sfenj" (بحال يلا ضربتي كلب باسفنجة), meaning a futile or Sisyphean endeavor, especially an act of pointless petty revenge (because if someone hits a dog with a Sfenj, the dog will eat and like it).
- "Demanding oil from a sufnāj" (طلب الزيت من سفناج), meaning "taking from the needy" (because a sufnāj—a Sfenj baker—uses large amounts of cooking oil).

== Gallery ==
Sfenj being deep-fried in a traditional tilted deep fryer in Marrakesh, Morocco. The Sfenj are placed on the edge with no oil to fry the bottom and inflate the dough. Once fully inflated they are moved into the hot oil.

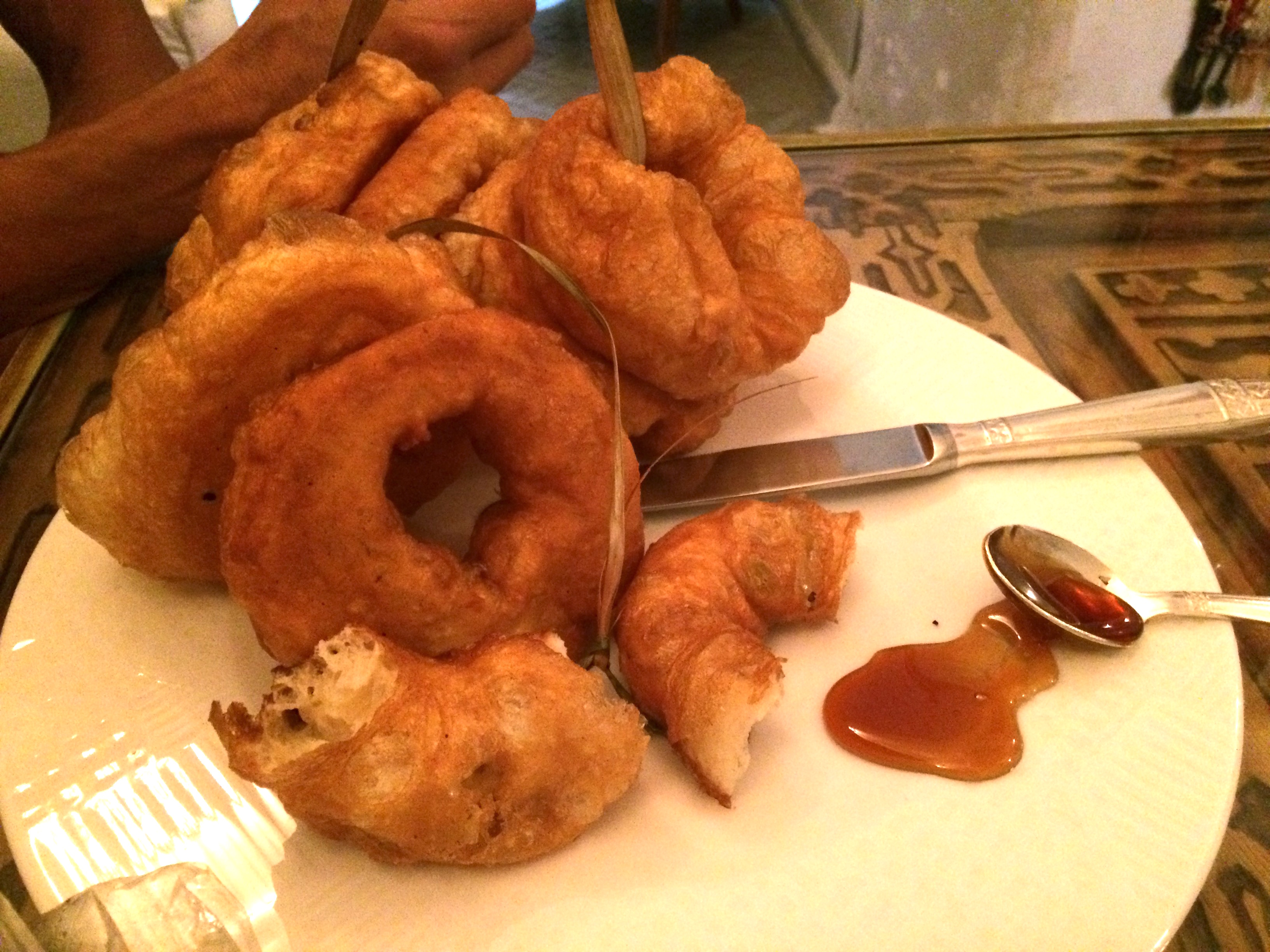
Sfenj in Essaouira Morocco. Sfenj are still bound together by passing a length of palm frond through the center as is pictured here.

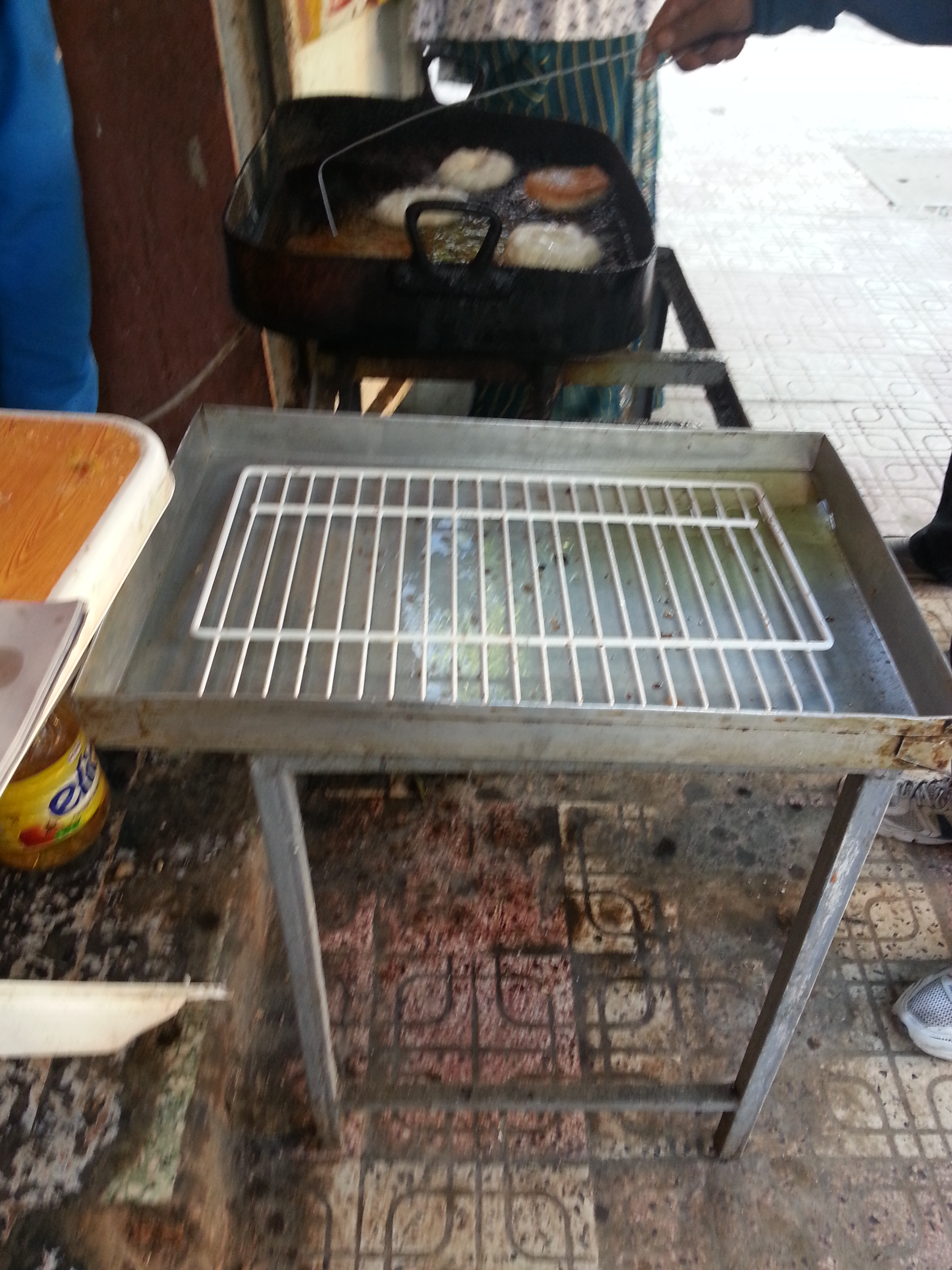
Method for making Sfenj in Algeria

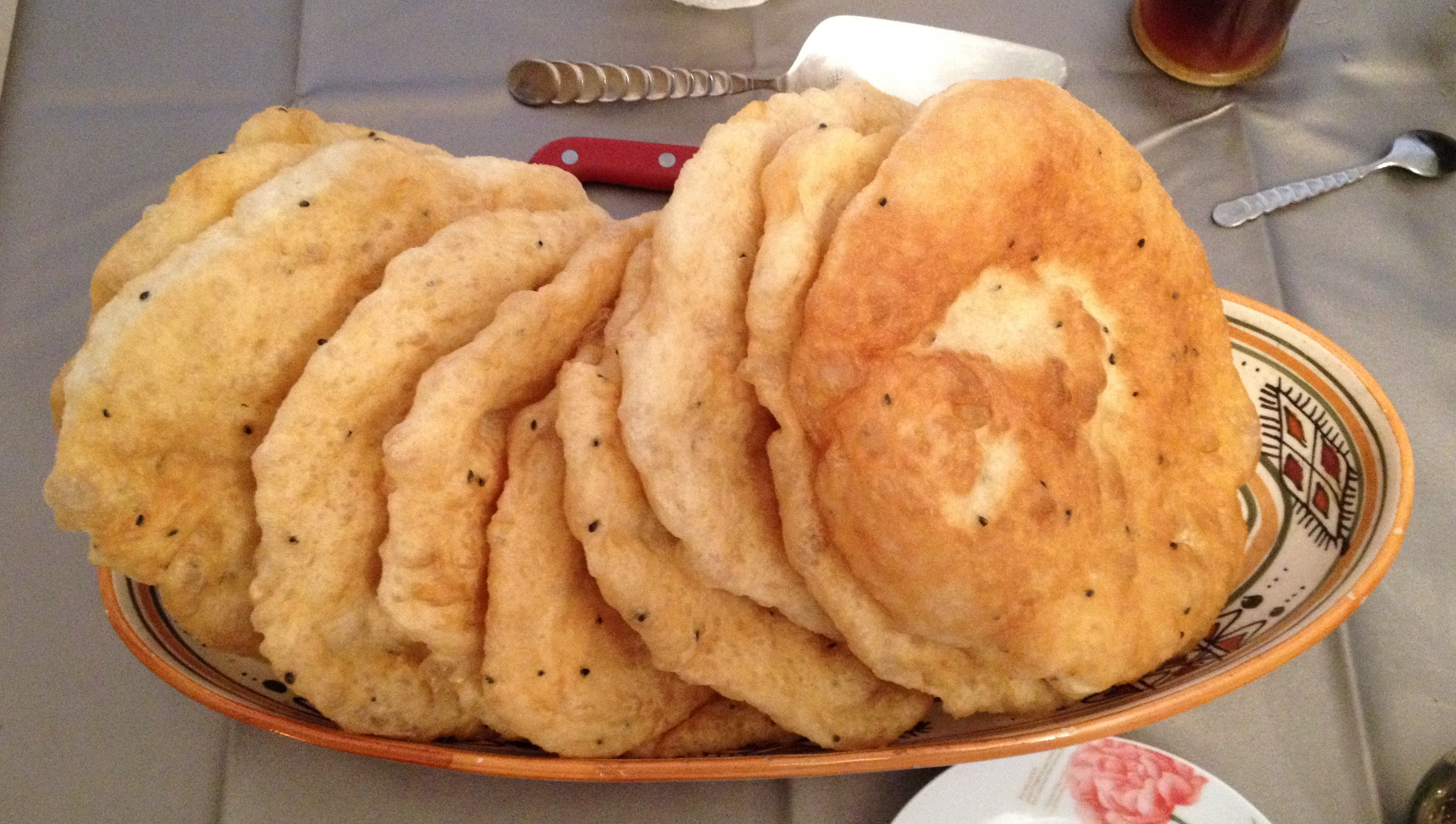
Khfaf from Kabylie in Algeria

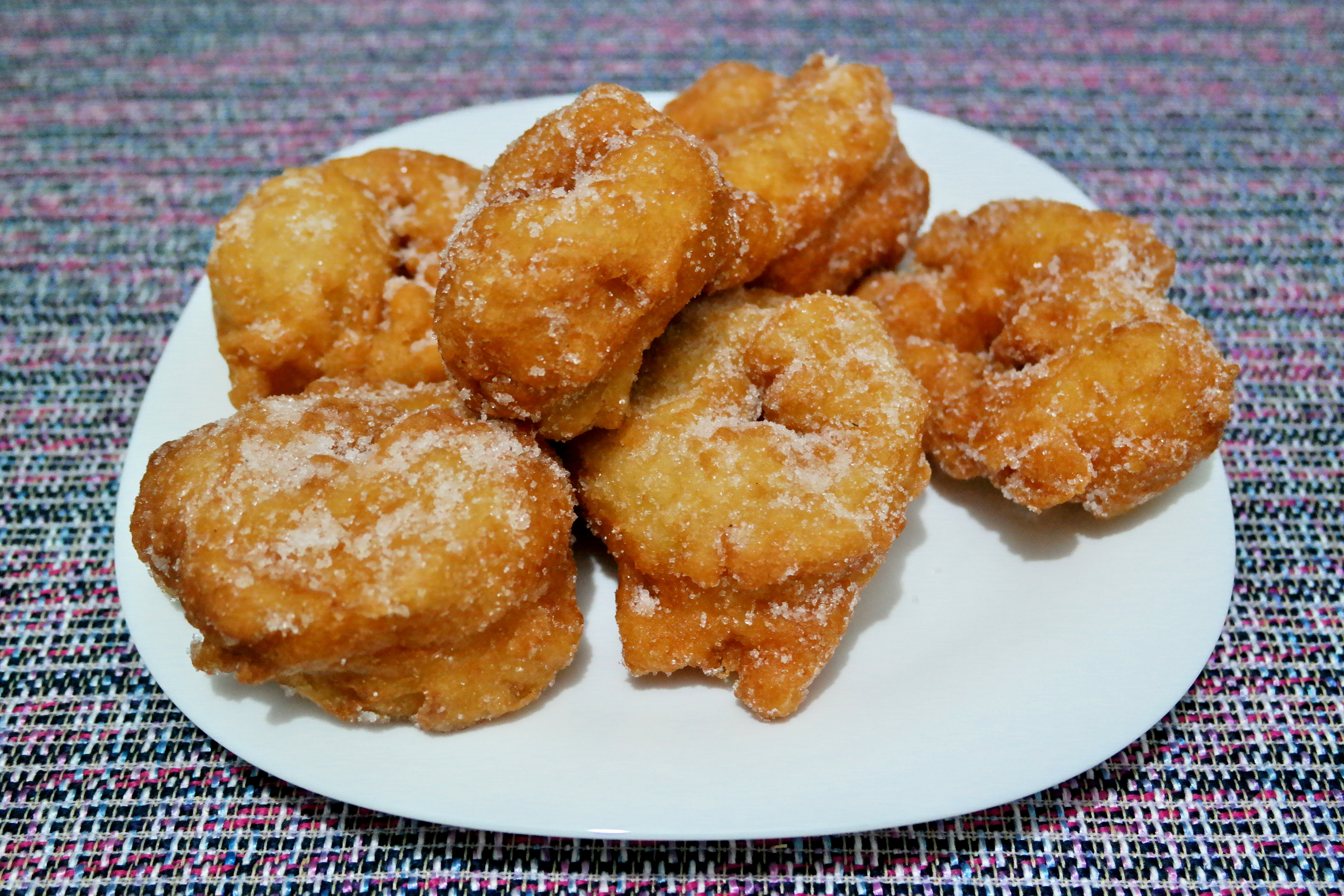
Sfenj sprinkled with sugar and served on a plate

== See also ==
- Malasada, the Portuguese equivalent
- Buñuelo, the Spanish equivalent
- Frittelle, the Italian equivalent
- Bambalouni, the Tunisian Equivalent
- Picarones
- List of doughnut varieties
