= Bambalouni =

Tunisian donut

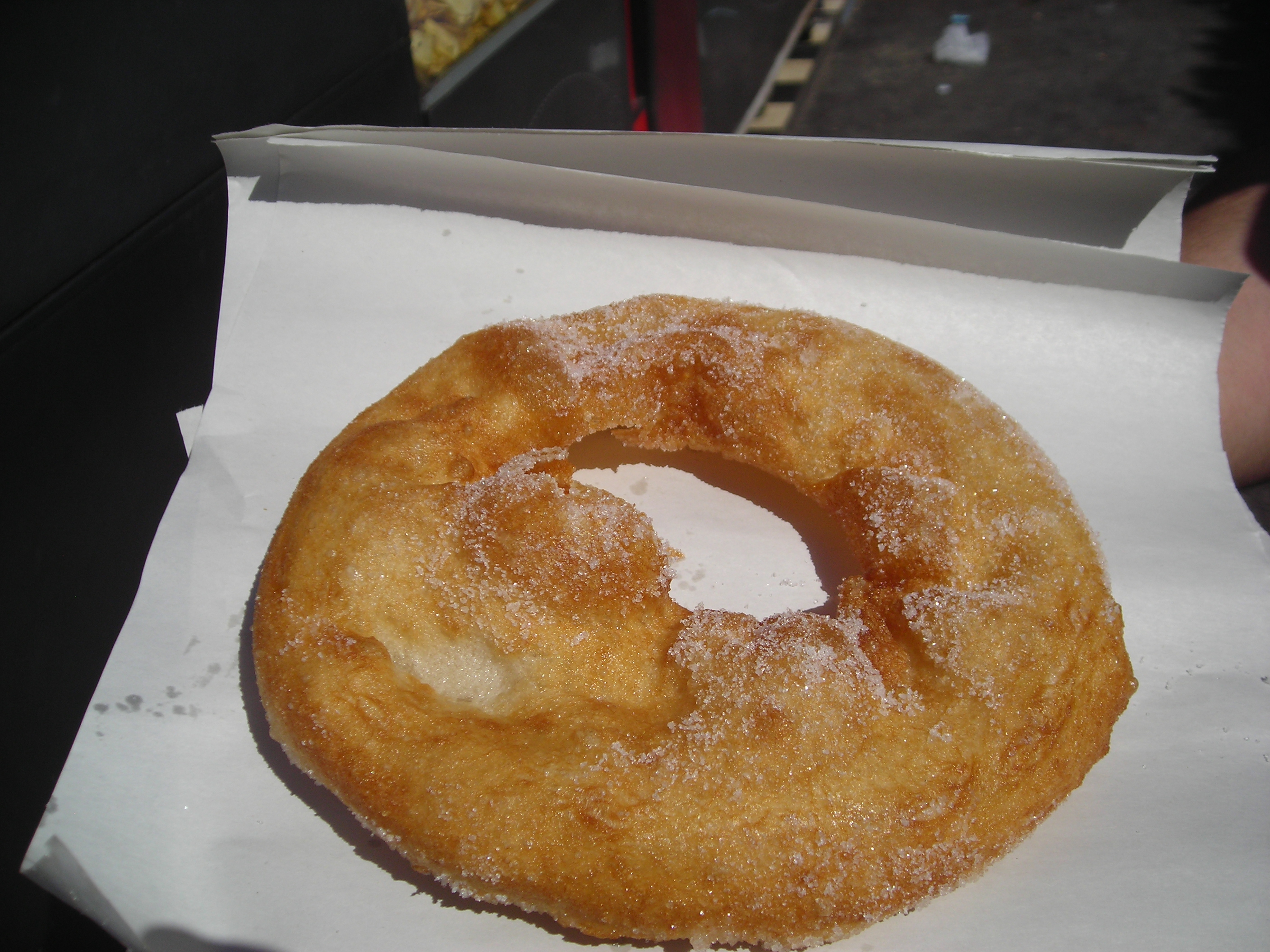
- Type: Doughnut
- Place of origin: Tunisia
- Main ingredients: Flour dough fried in oil

Bambalouni (Arabic: بمبالوني), also referred to as bambaloni, is a sweet Tunisian donut. It can be made at home or bought from fast food shops. It is prepared with a flour dough fried in oil. The bambaloni is eaten sprinkled with sugar or soaked in honey. It can be eaten at any time of day. It has come to be associated with Sidi Bou Said, where bambalouni is abundantly sold to Tunisians and visitors alike.

== Gallery ==
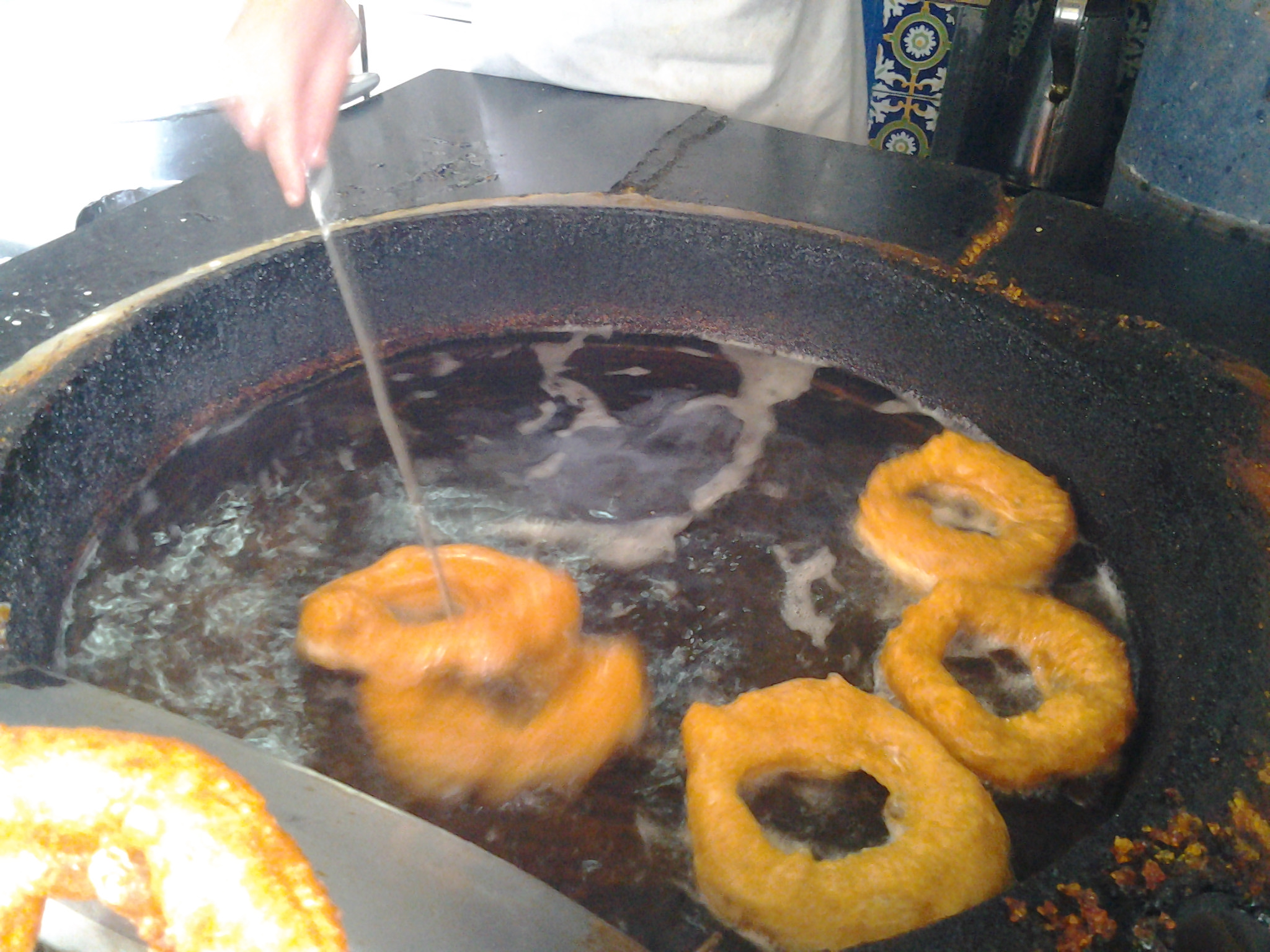

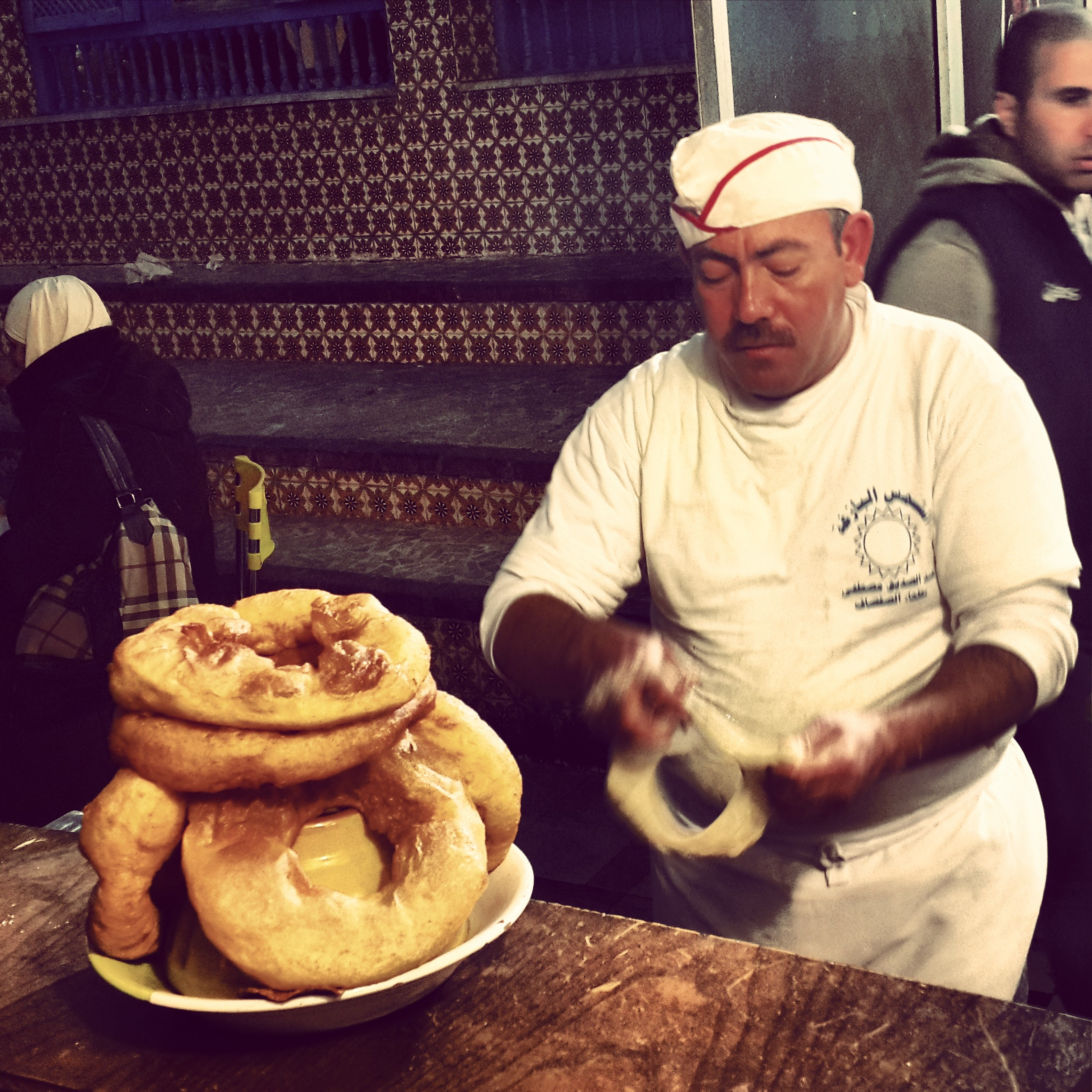

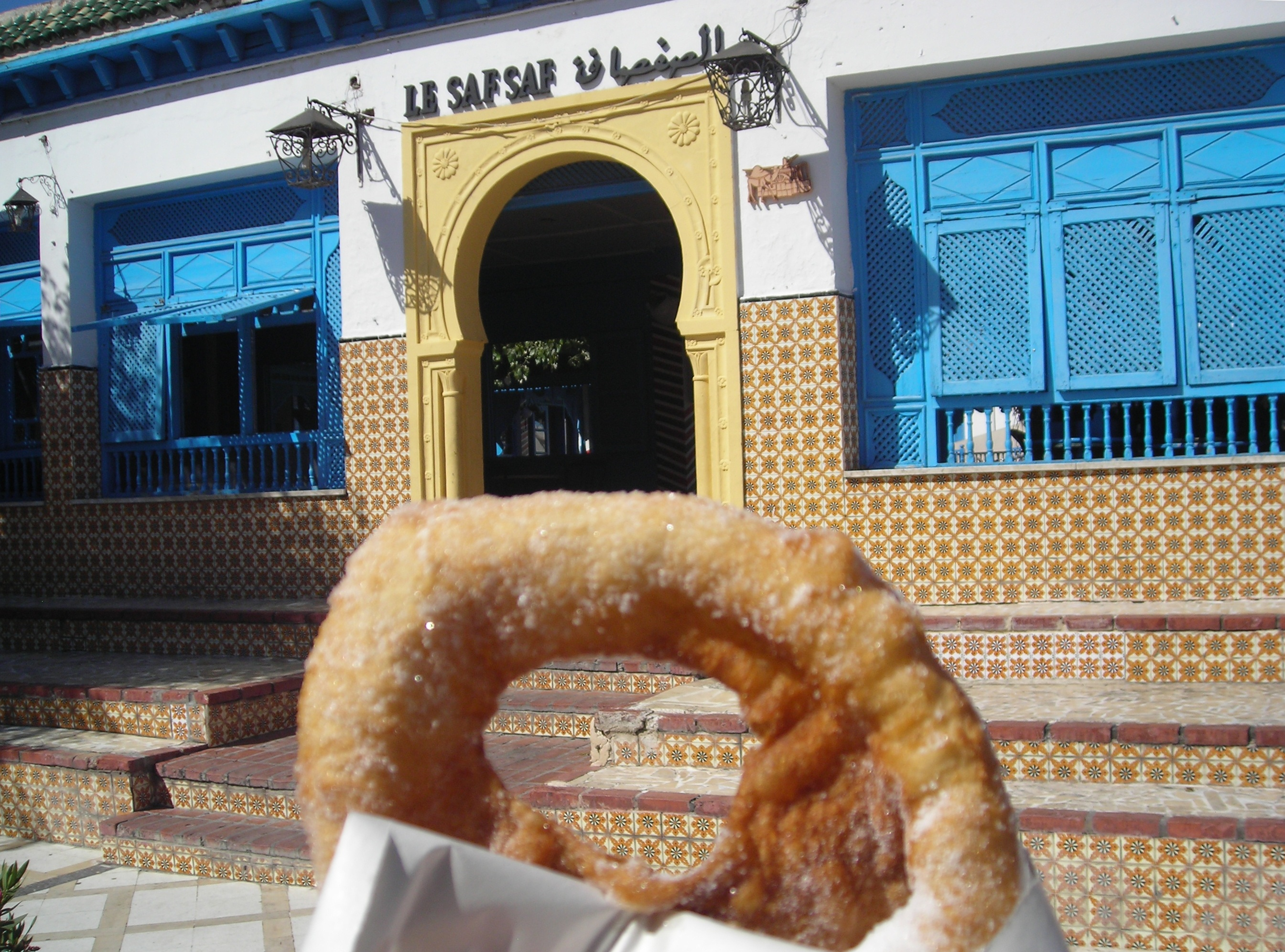

== See also ==
- Bombolone, the Italian version of the Bambalouni
- Sfenj
- Sfinz
- List of doughnut varieties
- List of fried dough varieties
- Cuisine of Tunisia
- Tulumba
- Fritelli
- Puff-puff
- Cuisine of Libya
