= Uštipci =

Dessert popular in the Southeast Europe

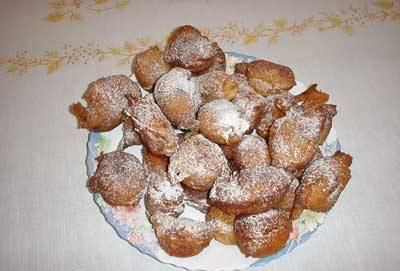
- Course: Dessert
- Region or state: Southeast Europe
- Serving temperature: Fried
- Main ingredients: Yeast, flour

Uštipci (Serbian Cyrillic: Уштипци, pronounced [ǔʃtɪpt͡sɪ]) are doughnut-like fried dough balls popular in Southeast European countries, namely Bosnia and Herzegovina, Croatia, Montenegro, North Macedonia, Serbia, and Slovenia.

== Origin ==
The origin of the uštipci pastry is unknown. The word uštipci comes from the verb uštinuti 'to nip, tweak, pinch'.

In Bosnia and Herzegovina, there exists a non-yeast variant of uštipci known as peksimeti; and an unleavened variant known as lokumi (not to be confused with the Bosnian shortbread known by the same name).

In Montenegro and parts of Bosnia and Herzegovina, a variant of this dish made with yeasted dough is called priganice, from the verb prigati 'to fry', reflecting the dough jumping in the pan while frying.

In Croatia, a variant of the dish known as fritule is also made; the two names are commonly used interchangeably for both dishes. In Croatia, a uštipak is typically sweet. The variety piroška (whose name is derived from pirog) refers to a kind of uštipci that can be both sweet (slatka) and savory (slana).

In Slovenia, a variant of the dish similar to fritule is called miške.

== Description ==
They are similar to fritule and also krofne but with more of a soft, bread-like feel. Unlike other dishes from the region, such as krofne, they do not necessarily have to be sweet. In restaurants, they might come with jam, kajmak or with cheese thus fulfilling the role of breakfast staple, dessert, or even a main course. They can also have other ingredients in them which most commonly are apple, pumpkin, but even meat and cheese are possibilities. They are eaten with tea or coffee and also as a dessert. They are also often served with powdered sugar sprinkled on top to make them more aesthetically pleasing. They can go well with jams, Nutella, and Eurocrem.

The plain variant fried with vegetable oil and seasoned with powdered sugar is served in Christian Balkan countries during Lent.
