= Al-Amīn al-Hajj Mustafa an-Nakīr =

Moroccan chef

- الأمين الحاج مصطفى النكير
- Born: Marrakesh, Morocco
- Occupation: Chef
- Known for: Meshwi, Tangia

al-Amīn al-Hajj Mustafa an-Nakīr (Arabic: الأمين الحاج مصطفى النكير) is a Moroccan chef specializing in barbecue. He worked as the chef of the former King of Morocco Hassan II, inheriting the position of palace chef from his forefathers. He specializes in and is famous for meshwi lamb and the traditional Marrakshi dish called tangia.

== Biography ==
He describes the barbecue culture of Marrakesh as having originated in the Sahara, having been passed down by ancestors and having retained its traditional and distinct style. His grandparents practiced the craft of barbecue at a jōṭia (جوطية an open, periodic marketplace) near the current location of the carpet shops. There had been a dedicated alleyway for the grilling of heads, as head meat with sfenj was popular breakfast food at the time. Tanjia was the traditional food of the craftsmen.

He has a restaurant in Marrakesh called 'end l-amīn (عند الأمين lit. 'At the Amine's,' or Chez L'Amine in French).

== See also ==
- Moroccan cuisine
- Cristeta Comerford
