= Frittella (doughnut) =

Italian doughnut

Frittelle
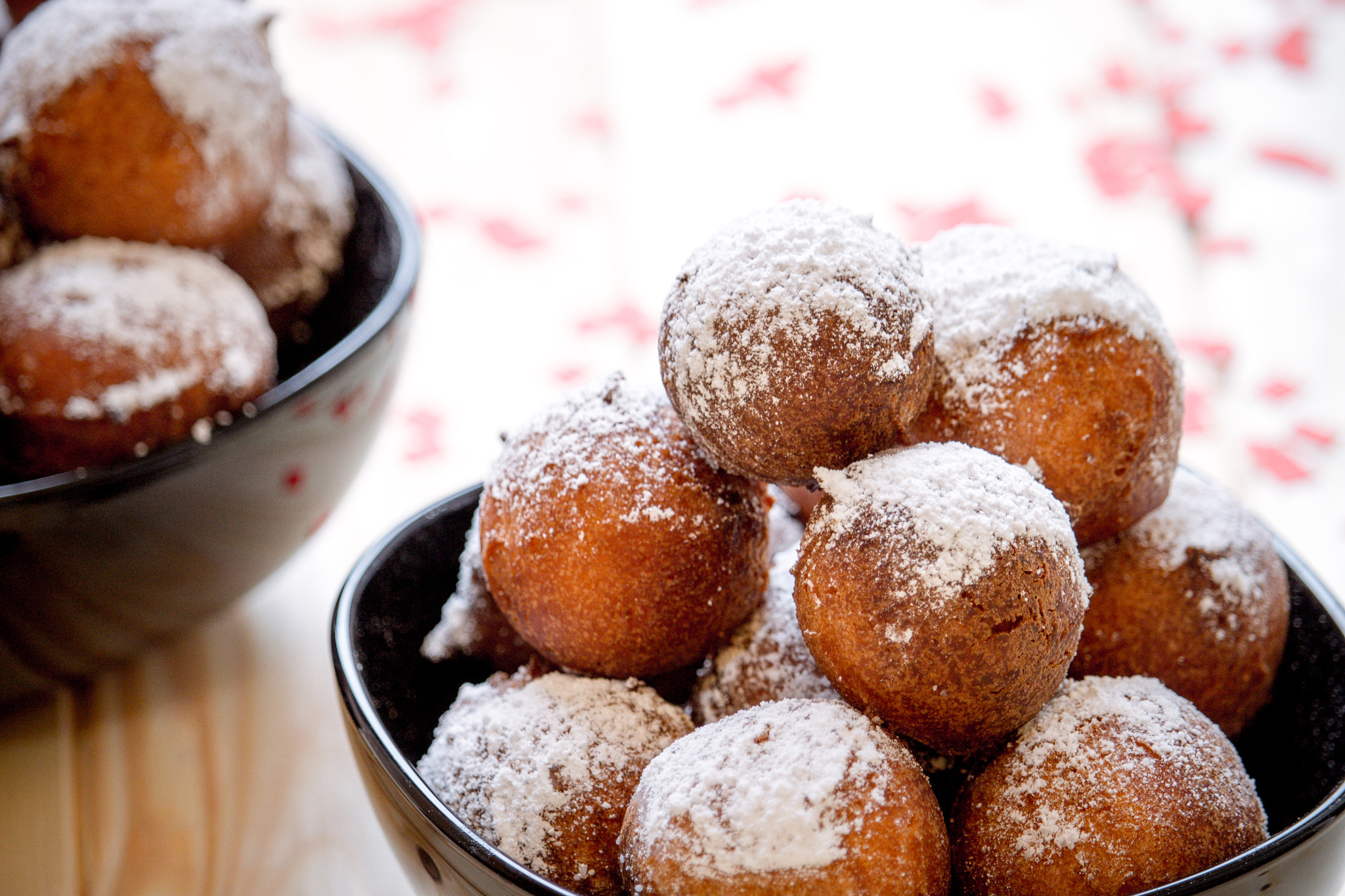
- Alternative names: Frìtołe, fritule
- Type: Doughnut
- Place of origin: Italy
- Main ingredients: Dough, raisins, orange and lemon zest

Frittella (pl.: frittelle) is a type of Italian fried doughnut made from dough, typically with raisins, orange peels, or lemon peel in them. They are eaten in and around the Friuli-Venezia Giulia and Veneto regions; however, frittelle originated around the Giuliani areas of Trieste and Venice. Many variations are common, including custard and chocolate fillings. They are fried in oil until golden brown and sprinkled with sugar.

Frittelle are included in the British Museum Cookbook by Michelle Berriedale-Johnson and a book about Venice from 1879.

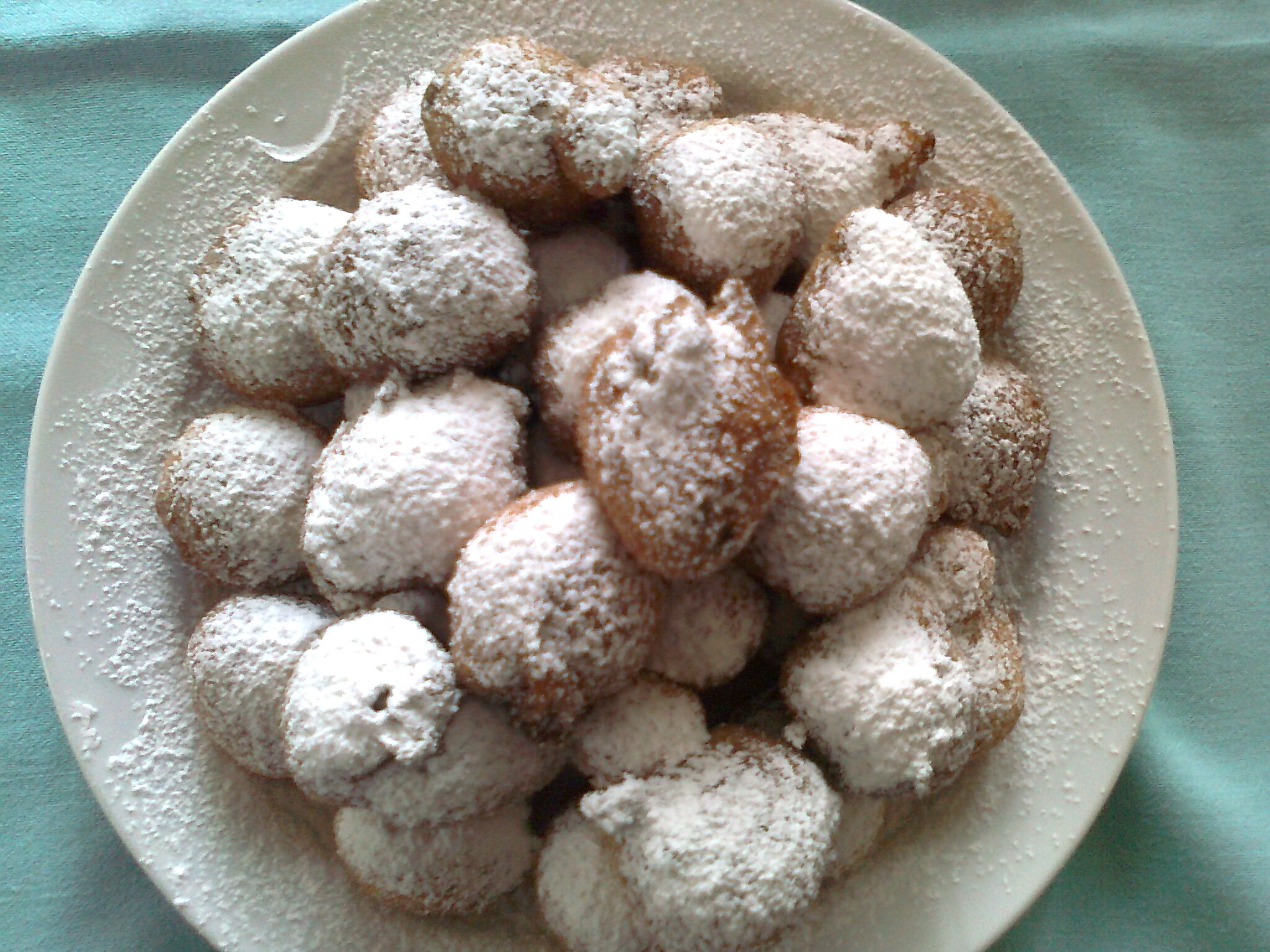
Frittelle di Carnevale veneziane

They are known as frìtołe in Venetian and frittelle or frittole in Italian. Similar to bomboloni, frìtołe are round, yeast-risen fried pastries, and are served only during Carnival in a number of different forms, including frìtołe veneziane, which are unfilled and have pine nuts and raisins stirred into the dough, and several filled varieties. Fillings include pastry cream, zabaione, and occasionally less common fillings such as apple or chocolate custard cream.

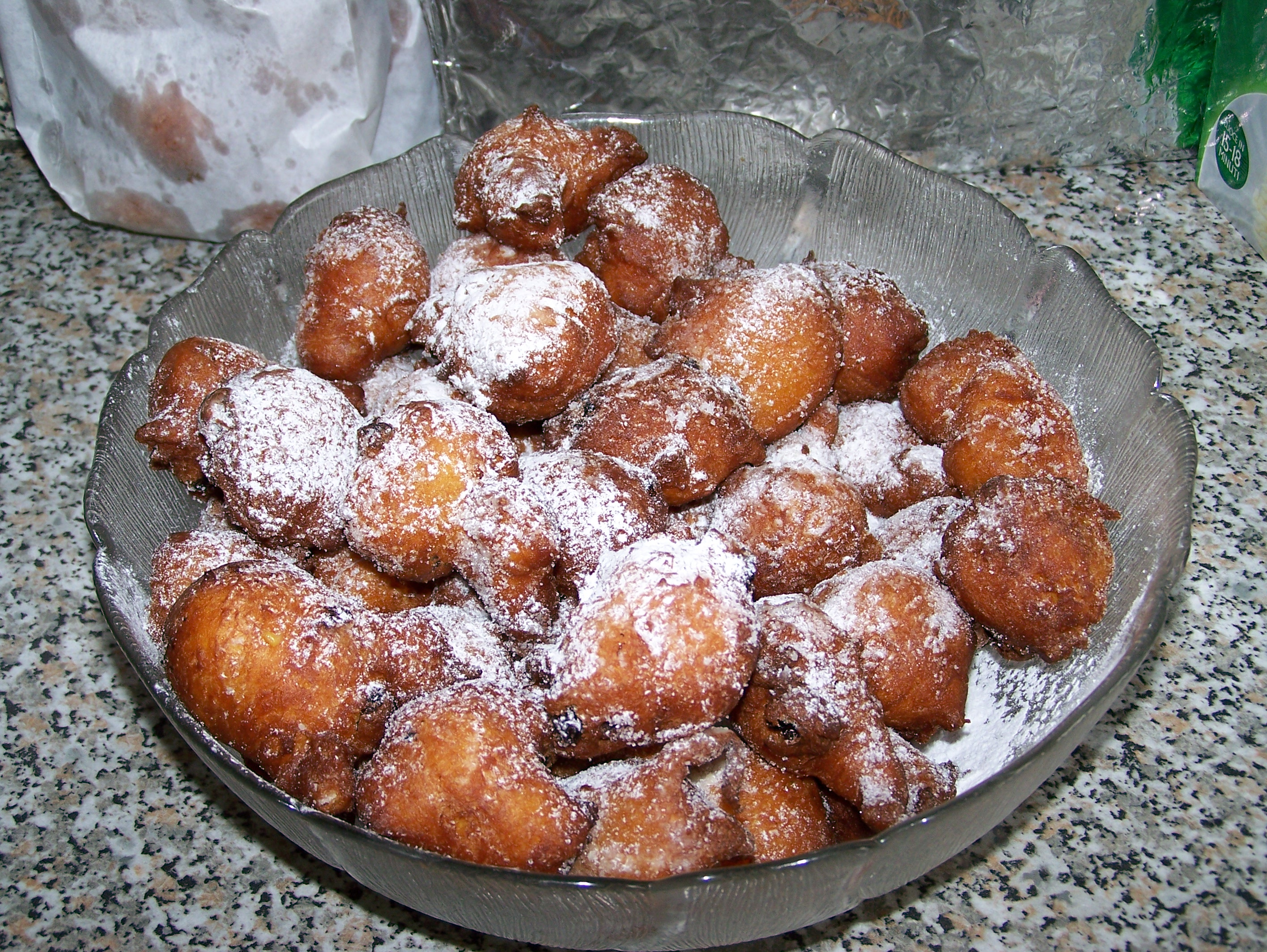
Fritulis

In Friuli, they are called fritulis.

In the comune (municipality) of Molfetta, located in the Apulia region, frittelle (sometimes spelt frittelli) is used as another name for panzerotti.

== Fritula ==
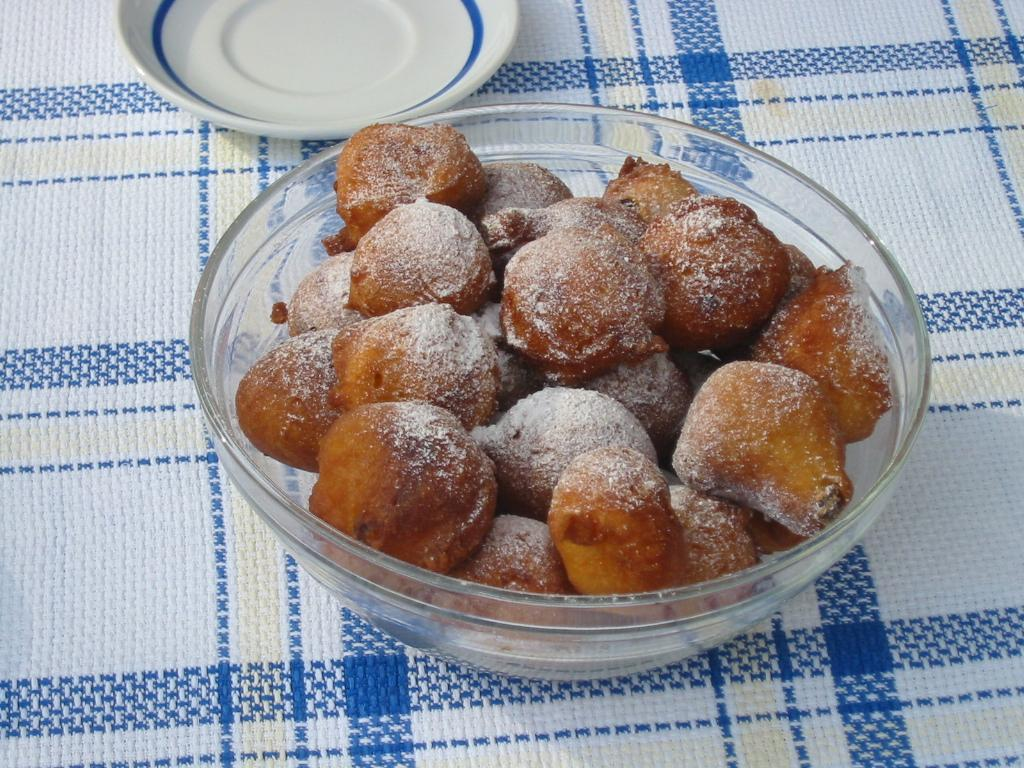
Fritule (miške)

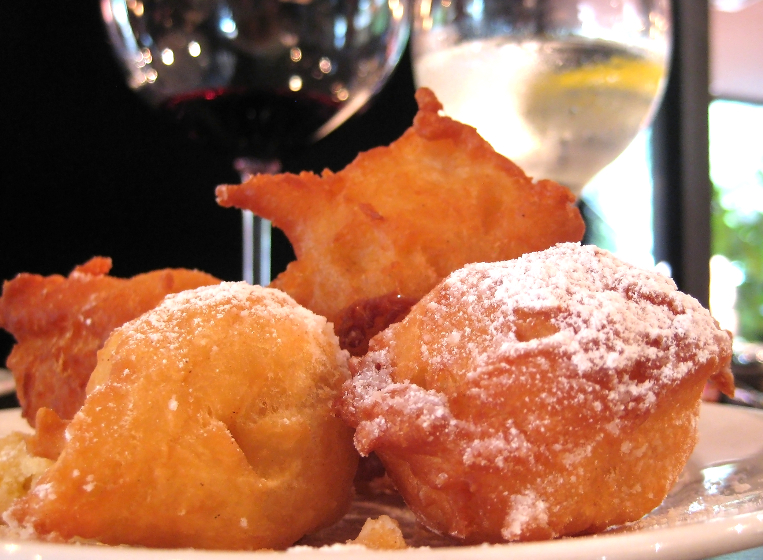
Fritule made for Christmas Eve

In Croatia, frittelle are called fritule (sg.: fritula) and are made particularly for Christmas. They are usually flavored with rum and citrus zest, containing raisins, and are topped with powdered sugar. A variant with potatoes is also made in the Bay of Kotor in Montenegro. Another variant of the dish, called miške, is prepared in Slovenia.

== See also ==
- List of Italian desserts and pastries
- List of doughnut varieties
- List of fried dough foods
- Nun's puffs
