= Bombolone =

Italian filled doughnut

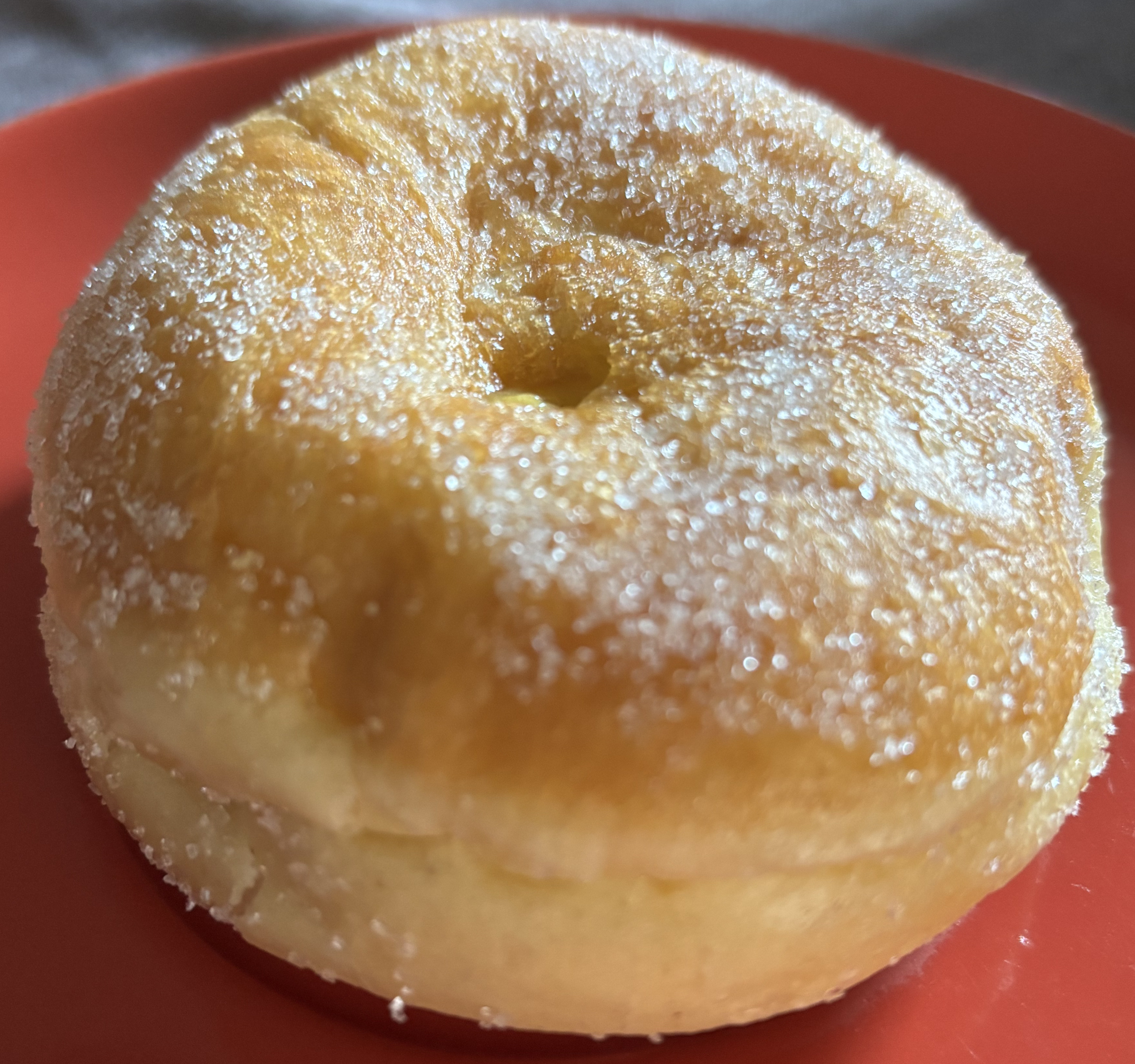
- Bombolone full of custard
- Type: Doughnut
- Course: Snack or dessert
- Place of origin: Italy
- Region or state: Tuscany

Bombolone (Italian: [bomboˈloːne]; pl.: bomboloni) is an Italian filled doughnut (similar to Berliner and pączek), eaten as a snack food and dessert. The pastry's name is etymologically related to bomba (lit. 'bomb'), and the same type of pastry is also called bomba (pl.: bombe) in some regions of Italy.

== History ==
While bomboloni may be primarily connected to Tuscany, they are traditional to other regions of Italy, although with slight variations on the recipe. In those areas that used to be under Austrian rule, such as Trentino-Alto Adige, Veneto, and Friuli-Venezia Giulia, the tradition of bomboloni is believed to have originated from that of Austrian "krapfen" (i.e., Berliner), and the recipe includes eggs, which are not found in the Tuscan variety.

Pasticcerie sometimes have handwritten signs for them, and food writer Emily Wise scornfully wrote that visitors might not be as taken with hot filled doughnuts in an area with wild boar salami and sandwiches with truffle oil on offer, but that residents of Tuscany enjoy them even at the beach. They are also sold from carts on the beach and are a bit distinct from the filled doughnuts in other countries by having the filling put in from the top, where it is sometimes visible, rather than injected from the side.

== See also ==
- List of Italian desserts and pastries
- List of doughnut varieties
- List of fried dough foods
- Bambalouni – the Tunisian version of the bombolone
