= Cascaron =

Filipino doughnut

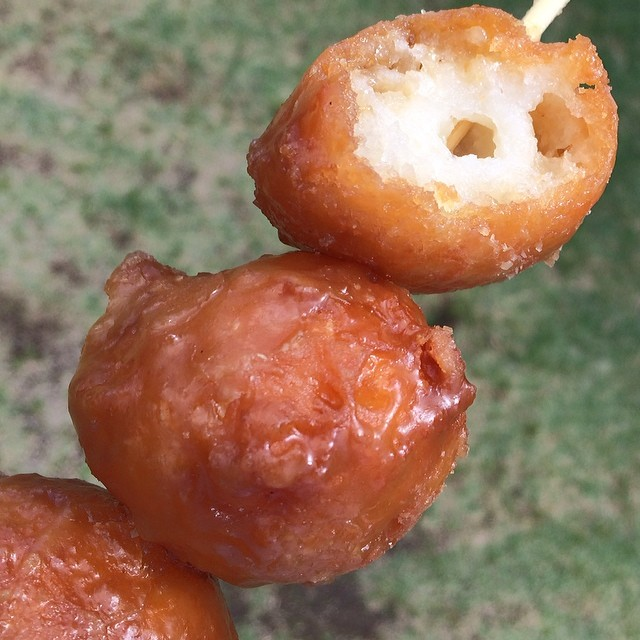
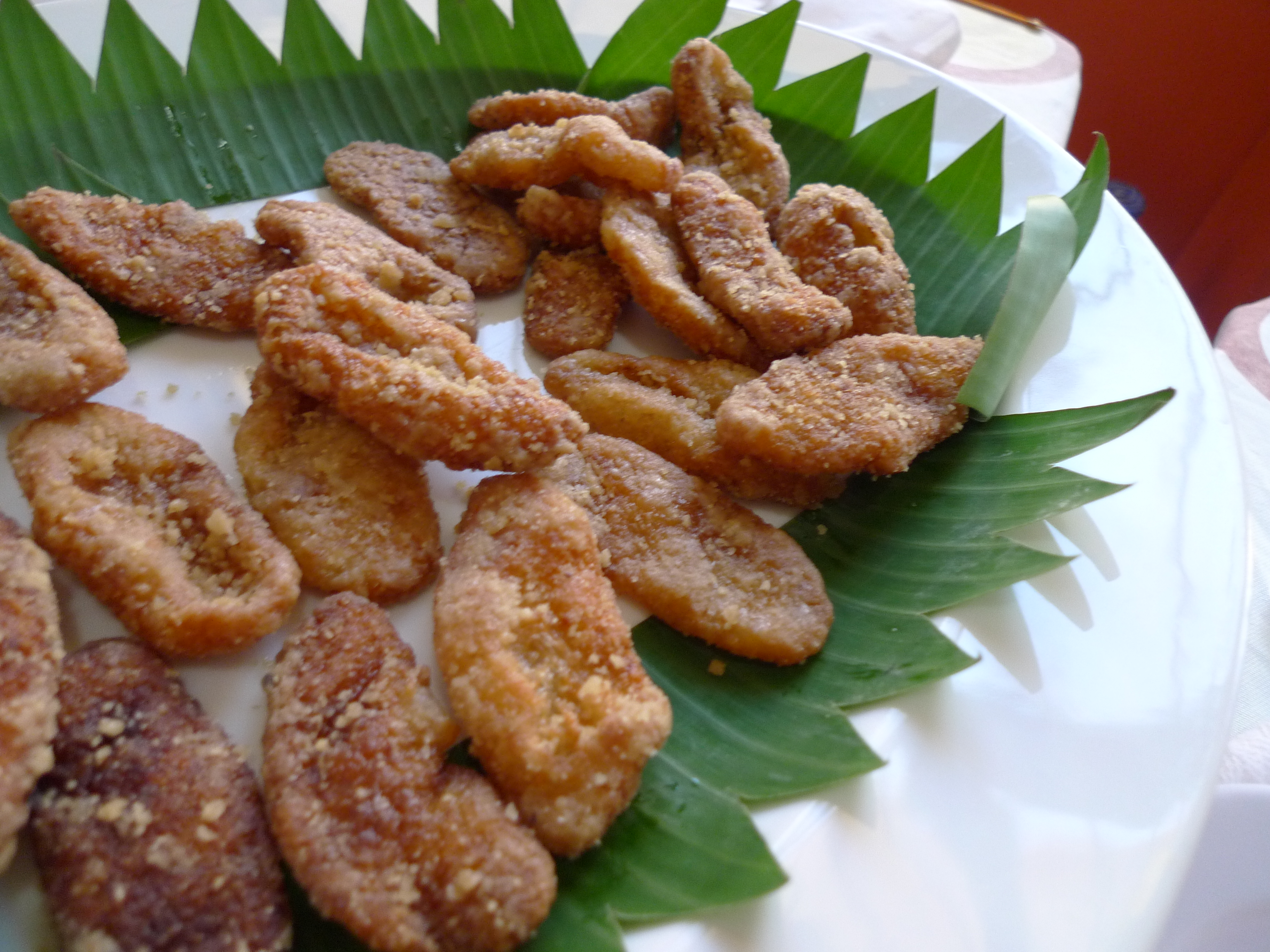
- Top: Skewered cascaron; Bottom: Ibanag pinakufu
- Alternative names: carioca, karioka, tinudok, bitsu-bitsu, bicho-bicho, pinakufu, paborot, binuelos, binowilos, bunuelos
- Course: Dessert
- Place of origin: Philippines
- Main ingredients: ground glutinous rice, grated coconut, and sugar

Cascaron is a Filipino doughnut made of deep-fried ground glutinous rice, grated coconut, and sugar. They are commonly ball-shaped and are sold on skewers, but they can also be elongated, pancake-shaped, or doughnut-shaped.

They are approximately golf-ball sized.

== Etymology ==
The name is derived from Spanish cascarón ("eggshell") due to its common spherical shape and crunchy exterior. It is not to be confused with cascarón, which is a hollowed-out chicken egg filled with prizes derived from the same term.

It is known by numerous other names, depending on the region, including carioca and tinudok. It is also known as bitsu-bitsu (or bicho-bicho) in Negros Occidental, not to be confused with bicho or bicho-bicho, which is a Chinese Filipino version of youtiao made with regular flour.

== See also ==
- Buñuelo
- Churro
- Panyalam
