= Lokot-lokot =

Filipino dessert

- Alternative names: Jaa, Locot-locot, Tagaktak, Tinagaktak, Tinagtag, Amik, Tinadtag
- Course: Dessert
- Place of origin: Philippines
- Region or state: Mindanao, Sulu
- Main ingredients: glutinous rice

Lokot-lokot or Locot-locot is a delicacy common in Mindanao and the Sulu Archipelago in the Philippines. It is also referred to as jaa in Sulu; tagaktak, tinagtag, tinadtag, or tinagaktak in Maguindanao del Norte and Maguindanao del Sur, and amik in Davao del Sur. Its texture is crunchy, usually colored golden-brown. Lokot-Lokot is usually produced and served on special occasions such as the Muslim feast of Eid al-Fitr.

Lokot-Lokot is made by repeatedly pounding glutinous rice until it becomes fine powder which is then blended with water and other ingredients to create a thick batter. The mixture is then poured into a halved coconut shell with holes called an uluyan directly into frying oil, resulting in fried mats of rice noodles. It is then formed into rolls or folded into a wedge using two wooden spoons called the gagawi.

== See also ==
- Daral (food)
- Kumukunsi
- Panyalam
- Shakoy
