= Kumukunsi =

Filipino deep-fried doughnut

- Type: Doughnut
- Place of origin: Philippines
- Region or state: Maguindanao
- Main ingredients: rice flour, duck eggs, sugar

Kumukunsi is a traditional Filipino deep-fried doughnut originating from the Maguindanao people. It is made from rice flour, duck eggs, and sugar. It is traditionally fried into spiral shapes. It has a creamy flavor, similar to pancakes.

== See also ==
- Binangkal
- Lokot-lokot
- Panyalam
- Shakoy
