= Panyalam =

Traditional Filipino fried rice pancake

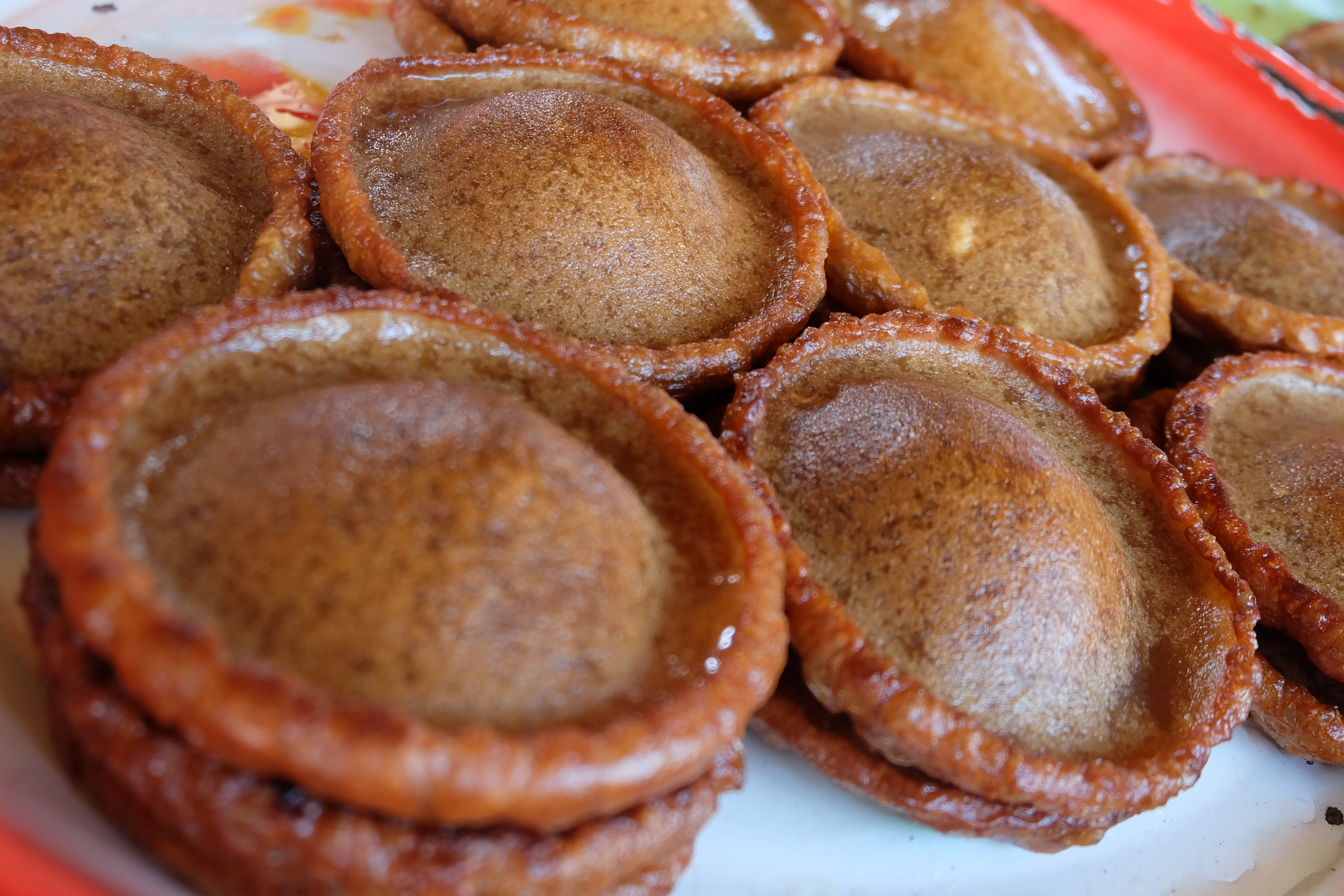
- Alternative names: Panyam, panialam
- Course: Dessert
- Place of origin: Philippines
- Region or state: Mindanao
- Main ingredients: Glutinous rice, muscovado, coconut milk
- Similar dishes: Bibingka, puto and penyaram

Panyalam or panyam is a traditional Filipino-Bangsamoro fried rice pancake. It is made with ground glutinous rice, muscovado (or brown sugar), and coconut milk mixed into a batter that is deep-fried.

Panyalam originates from Mindanao and nearby islands. It is particularly popular among Muslim Filipinos, including among the Maguindanao, Maranao, Sama-Bajau, and Tausug people. It is commonly served during special occasions and religious holidays (notably during Hari Raya). It is also a traditional dish among native Christian and animist Lumad groups, like the Mansaka and non-Islamized communities of the Sama-Bajau.

== See also ==
- Kue pinyaram
- Kuzhi paniyaram
- Tupig
- Bibingka
- Kakanin
- Kumukunsi
- List of pancakes
- Lokot-lokot
- Okoy
- Palitaw
- Pastil
- Puto
- Shakoy
