= Fartura =

Portuguese doughnut

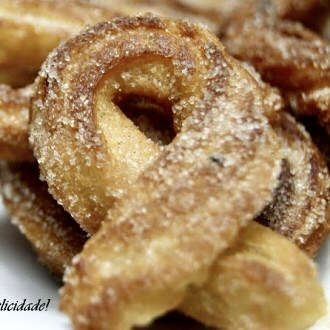
Traditional farturas

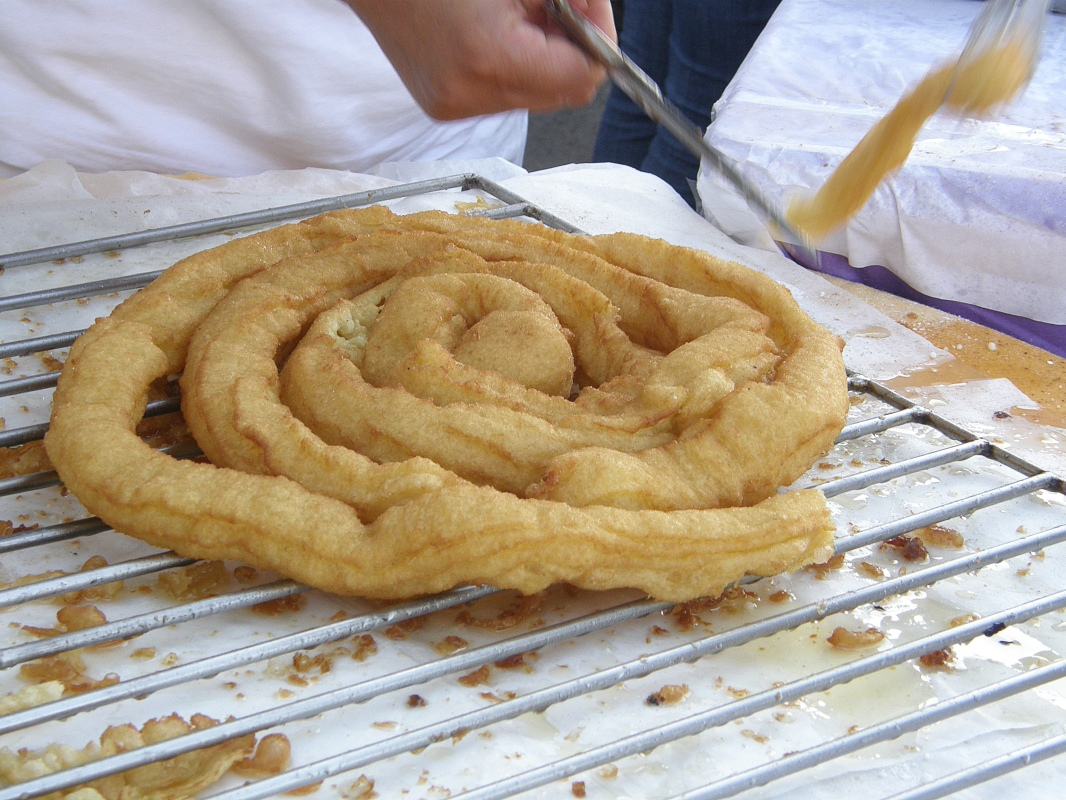

A fartura is a fried dough made of flour, yeast, baking soda, salt, sugar, cinnamon, and water, that is fried in oil, in the form of a roll and traditionally sold at fairs in Portugal. It is preferable to consume them when they are hot so that the crunchy surface does not harden.

== Origins ==
Fartura comes from the Latin root 'farto,' meaning full or satiated.

One theory is that the Portuguese, when trading in the Far East, would have brought with them new cooking techniques, including modifying the dough of Youtiao, also known as Youzagwei, in southern China. However, they would have changed the aspect to the star shape, because they did not learn the Chinese technique of "pulling" the dough (the Chinese emperor made it a crime with the death penalty if anyone shared knowledge with foreigners). As a result, the farturas are not "pulled" but extruded from a star-shaped mold.

Another theory is that farturas may have been an adaptation of the Spanish churros, which were created by shepherds as a substitute for foods made with fresh pasta. Churro dough was easy to produce and fry over an open fire in the mountains, where shepherds lived most of the time.

== See also ==
- List of doughnut varieties
- Churro
