= Shakoy =

Traditional Filipino deep-fried twisted doughnut

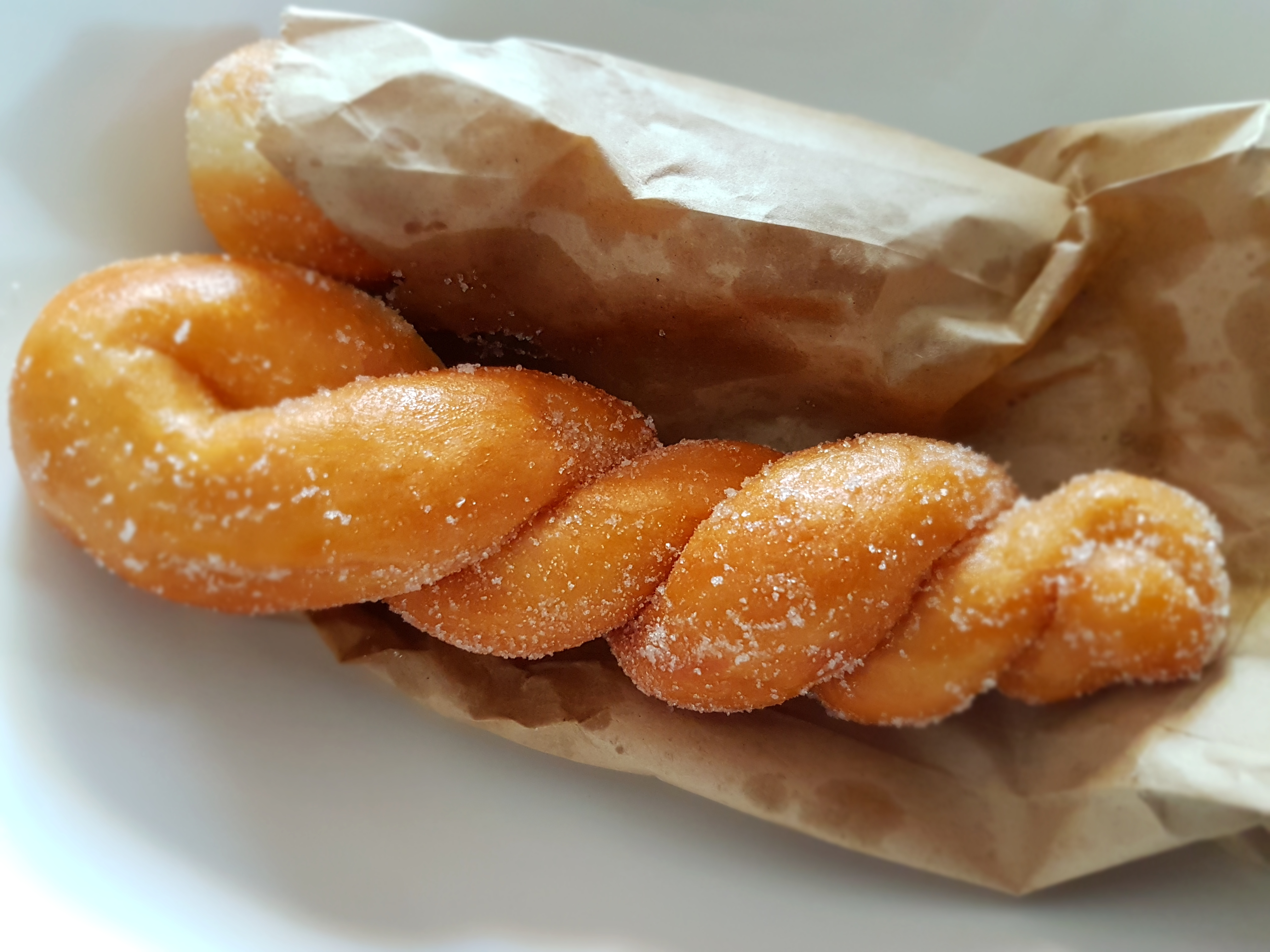
- Alternative names: Lubid-lubid
- Type: Doughnut
- Place of origin: Philippines
- Region or state: Visayas
- Variations: Pilipit

Shakoy, (Note: Cebuano: siyakoy; Tagalog: siyakoy; Hokkien Chinese: 油炸粿, Pe̍h-ōe-jī: iû-chiā-kóe) also known as lubid-lubid ("little rope") or bicho bicho, is a traditional Filipino deep-fried twisted doughnut. It is traditionally made with flour, sugar, salt, and yeast and deep-fried. It is then sprinkled with white sugar. Variants of shakoy can also be made with other kinds of flour, most notably with rice flour, which results in a chewier version that is also usually coated with sesame seeds. Dry and crunchy versions of shakoy, which are usually much smaller, are known as pilipit.

These types of twisted doughnuts also have versions in different countries. Like the Kkwabaegi of Korea, Mahua in China and Taiwan, and Treccia in Italy.

Shakoy is often eaten as a snack or a dessert, and it is also served for breakfast.

== See also ==
- Binangkal
- Kumukunsi
- Lokot-lokot
- Panyalam
- Untir-untir
- Pilipit
- Cakoi / Cakwe (Malaysia / Indonesia)
