= Churro =

Fried-dough pastry

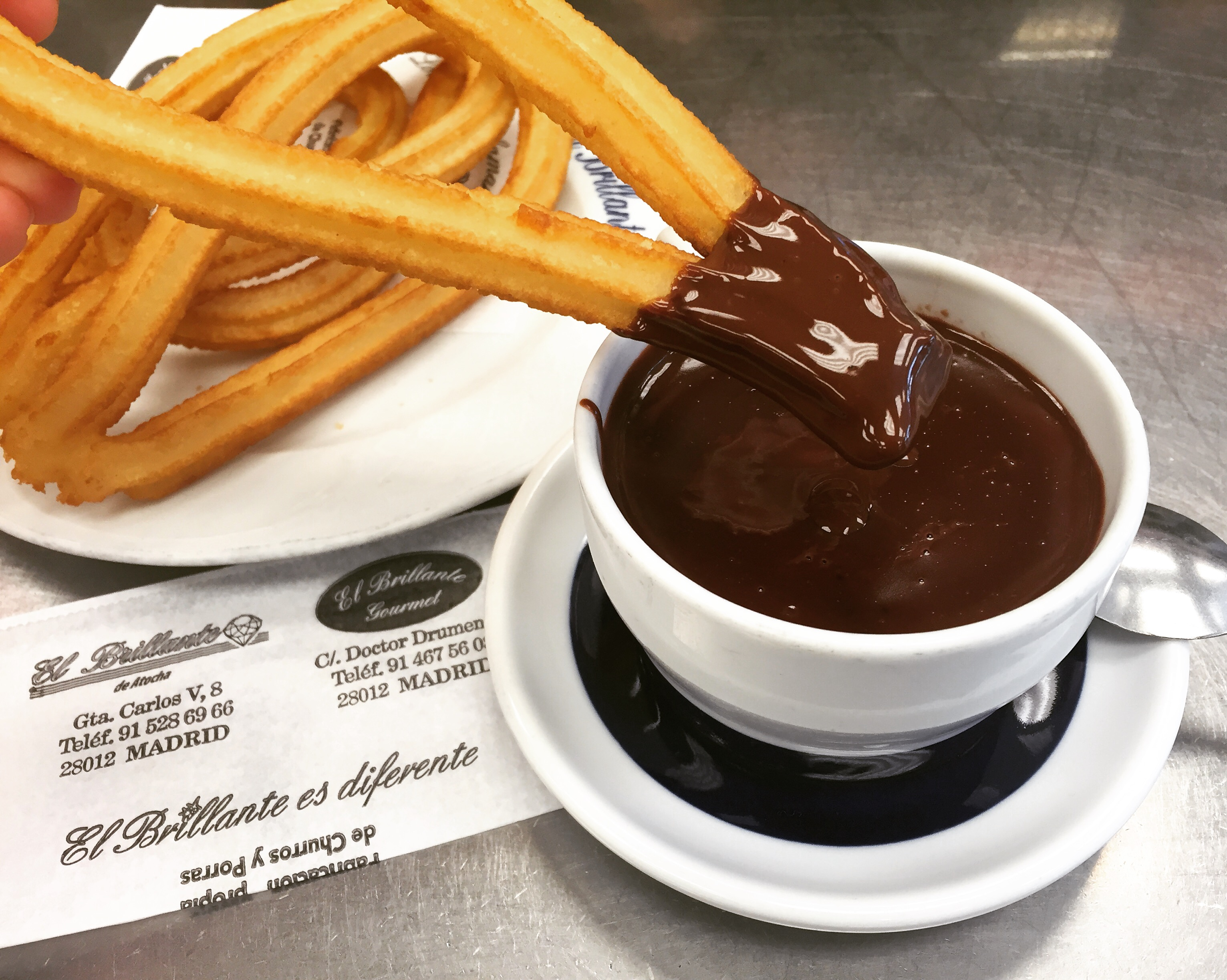
- A plate of churros with a cup of chocolate
- Alternative names: Tejeringos
- Type: Fried dough
- Course: Breakfast, lunch, dinner, snack
- Place of origin: Iberian Peninsula
- Region or state: Southern Europe
- Serving temperature: Hot
- Main ingredients: Deep-fried choux pastry (flour, water, butter, eggs, salt)

A churro (Spanish pronunciation: [ˈtʃuro], Portuguese pronunciation: [ˈʃuʁu]) is a type of fried dough from Spanish and Portuguese cuisine, made with choux pastry dough piped into hot oil with a piping bag and large closed star tip or similar shape. They are also found in Latin American cuisine, Philippine cuisine and in other areas that have received immigration from Spanish- and Portuguese-speaking countries, especially in France and the Southwestern United States.

In Spain, churros can either be thin (and sometimes knotted) or long and thick, where they are known as porras, jeringos, or tejeringos in some regions. They are normally eaten for breakfast dipped in coffee, or in hot chocolate for an afternoon snack. There are also two slightly different snacks in Portugal, called porra and fartura, which are filled with jelly instead of the doce de leite traditional to Brazilian churros.

== Etymology ==
According to the Diccionario de la lengua española, churro is onomatopoeic, ultimately imitative of the sound of frying.

== History ==
The origin of churros is unclear. But according to food historian Michael Krondl, "today's churro is not that different from a recipe for a flour and water fritter that you find in Apicius, a Roman cookbook dating from the 1st century AD. And there are recipes from the Ancient Greeks, but it's probably even older than that. In the Mediterranean basin it's basically been around forever".

But there are also other theories: one of them is that the churro was made by Spanish shepherds to substitute for fresh baked goods. Churro paste was easy to make and fry in an open fire in the mountains, where shepherds spent most of their time, but the nomadic lifestyle of the shepherds and the large quantities of oil or fat needed to fry churros make that unlikely.

Another theory, considered a hoax by some people suggests the concept was brought to Europe from China by the Portuguese. The Portuguese sailed for the Orient; as they returned from Ming-dynasty China to Portugal, they brought along with them new culinary techniques. One included altering dough for youtiao, also known as yóuzháguǐ in southern China, which bears a resemblance to the churro. The new pastry was soon introduced to Spain, where it was modified to have the dough extruded through a star-shaped nozzle (compare a piping bag) rather than pulled.

== Preparation ==
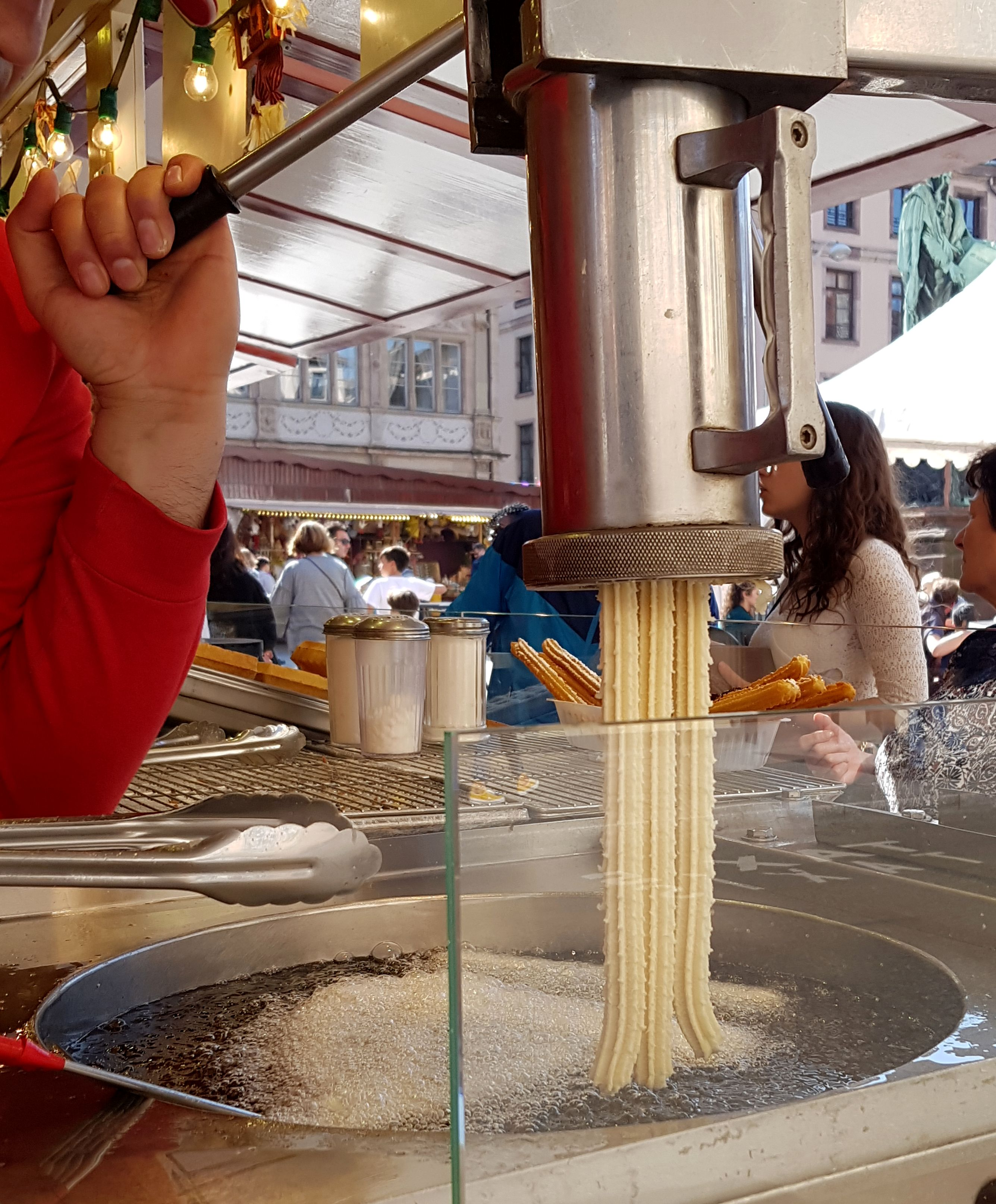
Extruding dough for churros in Strasbourg

Churros are fried until they become crunchy, and may be sprinkled with sugar. The surface of a churro is ridged due to having been piped from a churrera, a syringe-like tool with a star-shaped nozzle. Churros are generally prisms in shape, and may be straight, curled or spirally twisted.

Like pretzels, churros are sold by street vendors, who may fry them freshly on the street stand and sell them hot. In Spain and much of Latin America, churros are available in cafes for breakfast, although they may be eaten throughout the day as a snack. Specialized churrerías, in the form of a shop or a trailer, can be found during the holiday period. In addition, countries like Colombia, Peru, Spain and Venezuela have churrerías throughout their streets. In Portugal, they are commonly eaten at carnivals, fairs and other celebrations, where they are made freshly at street stands.

The dough is a mixture of flour, water and salt. Some versions are made of potato dough. Depending on the recipe, it may not be vegan, as they can contain butter, milk or eggs.

== Making Churros ==
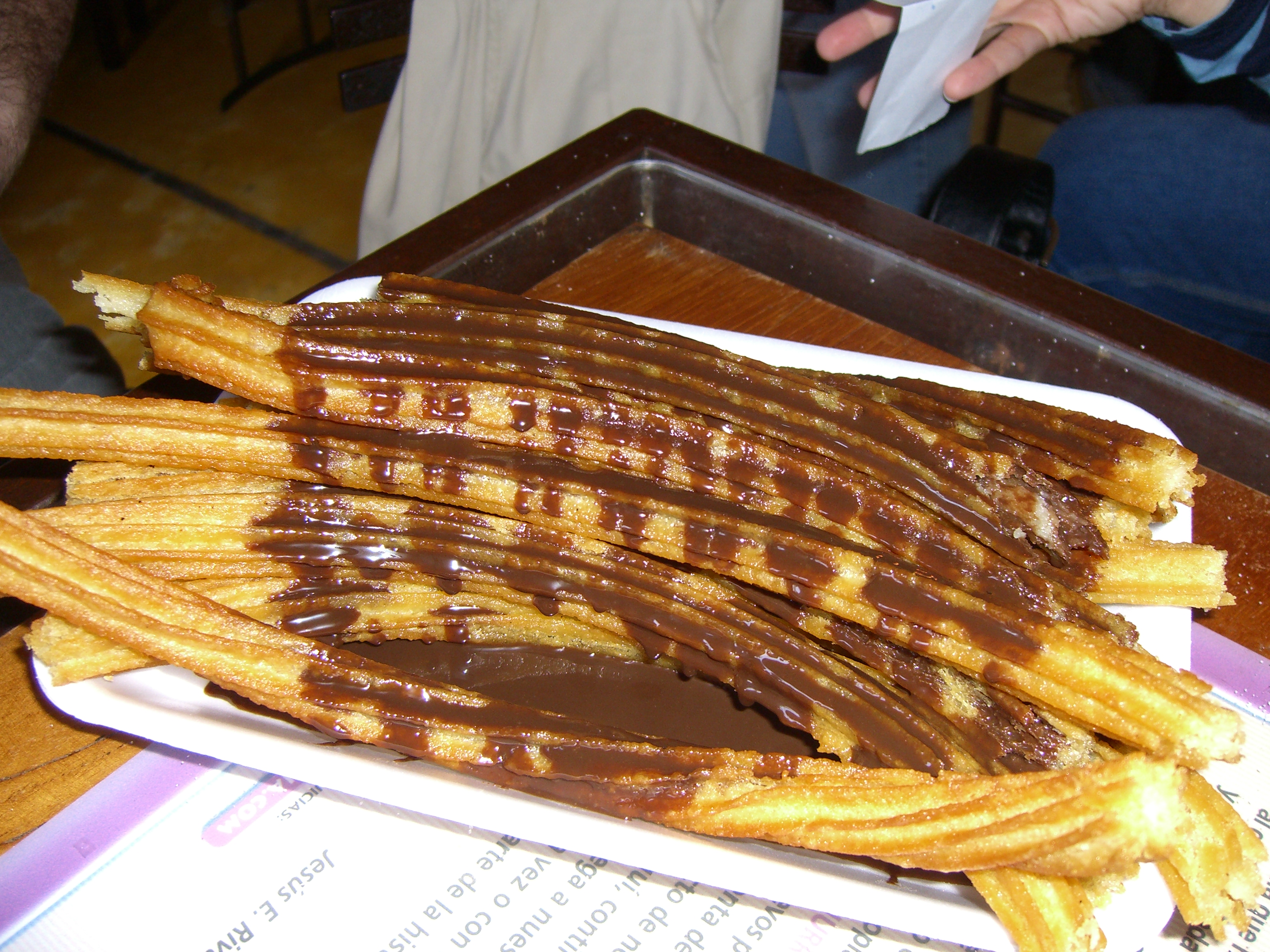
Churros drizzled with chocolate

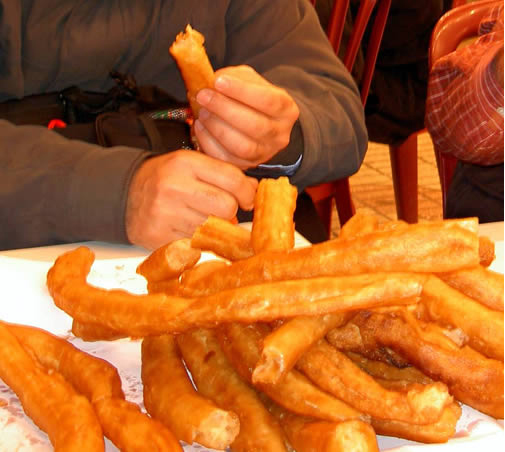
"Tejeringos" or "Calentitos", an Andalusian variation of the churro

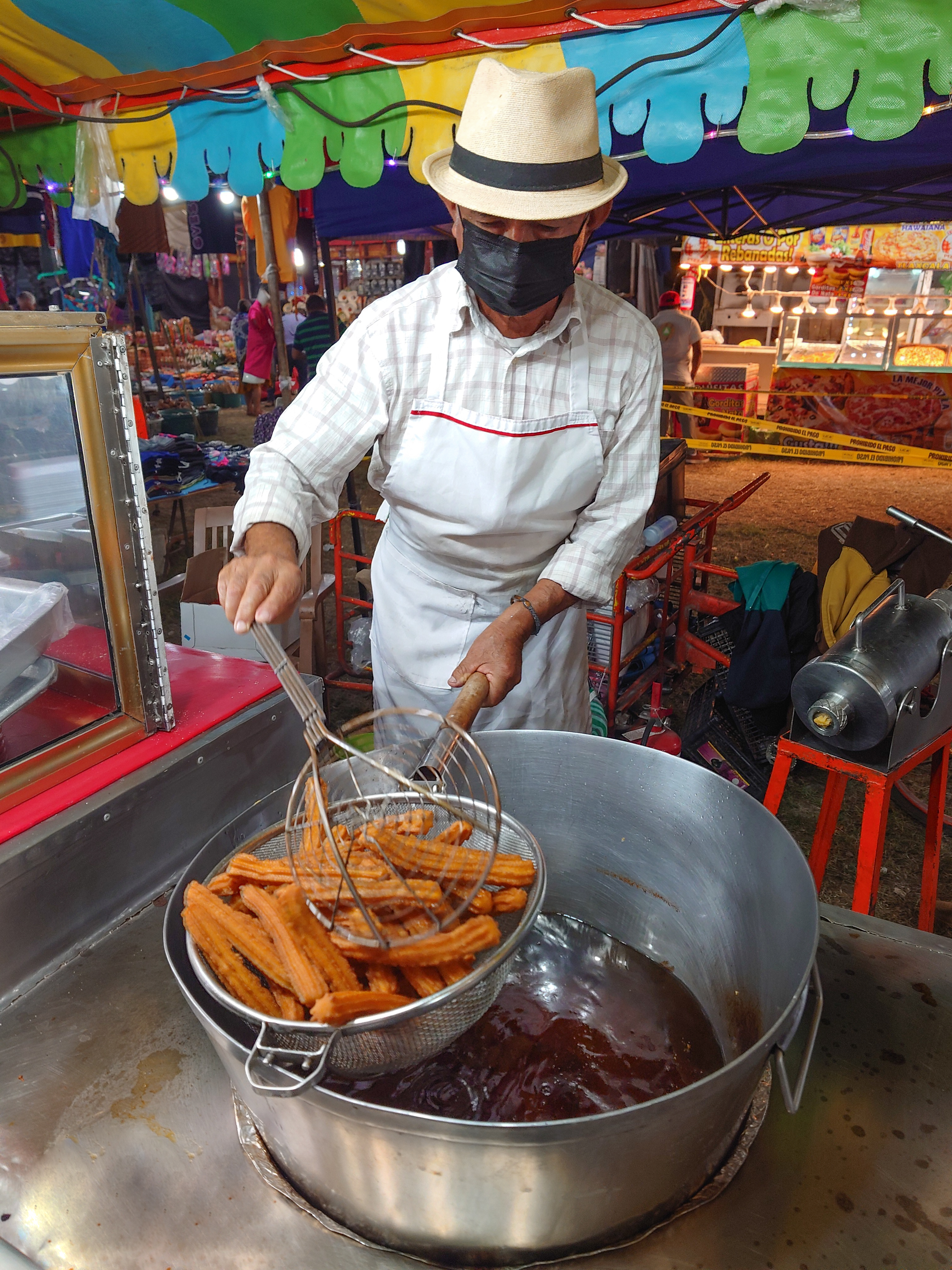
Circus vendor in Mexico offering churros

A street vendor in Colombia making churros

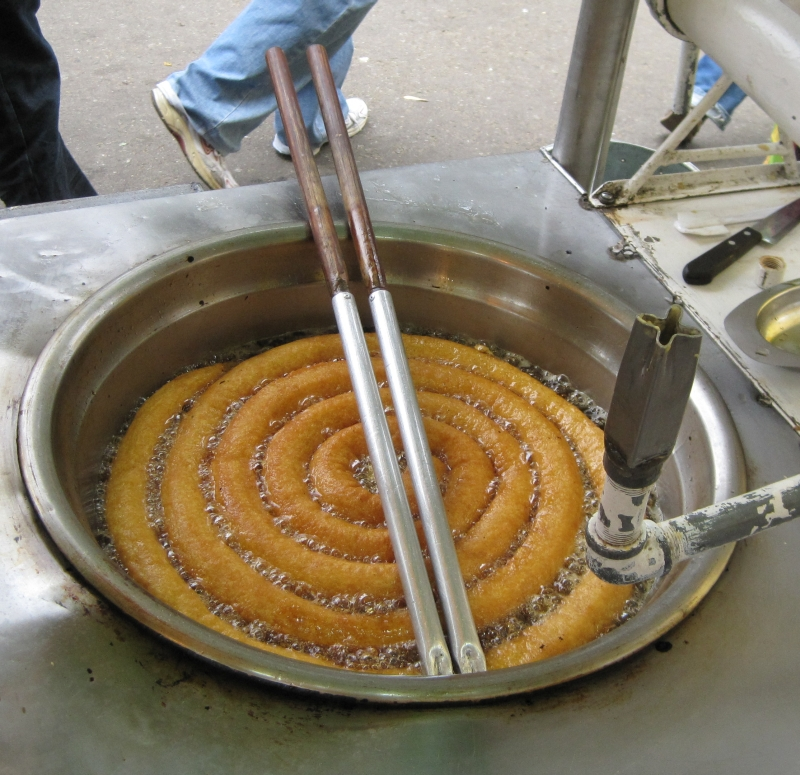
Churros in Guatemala

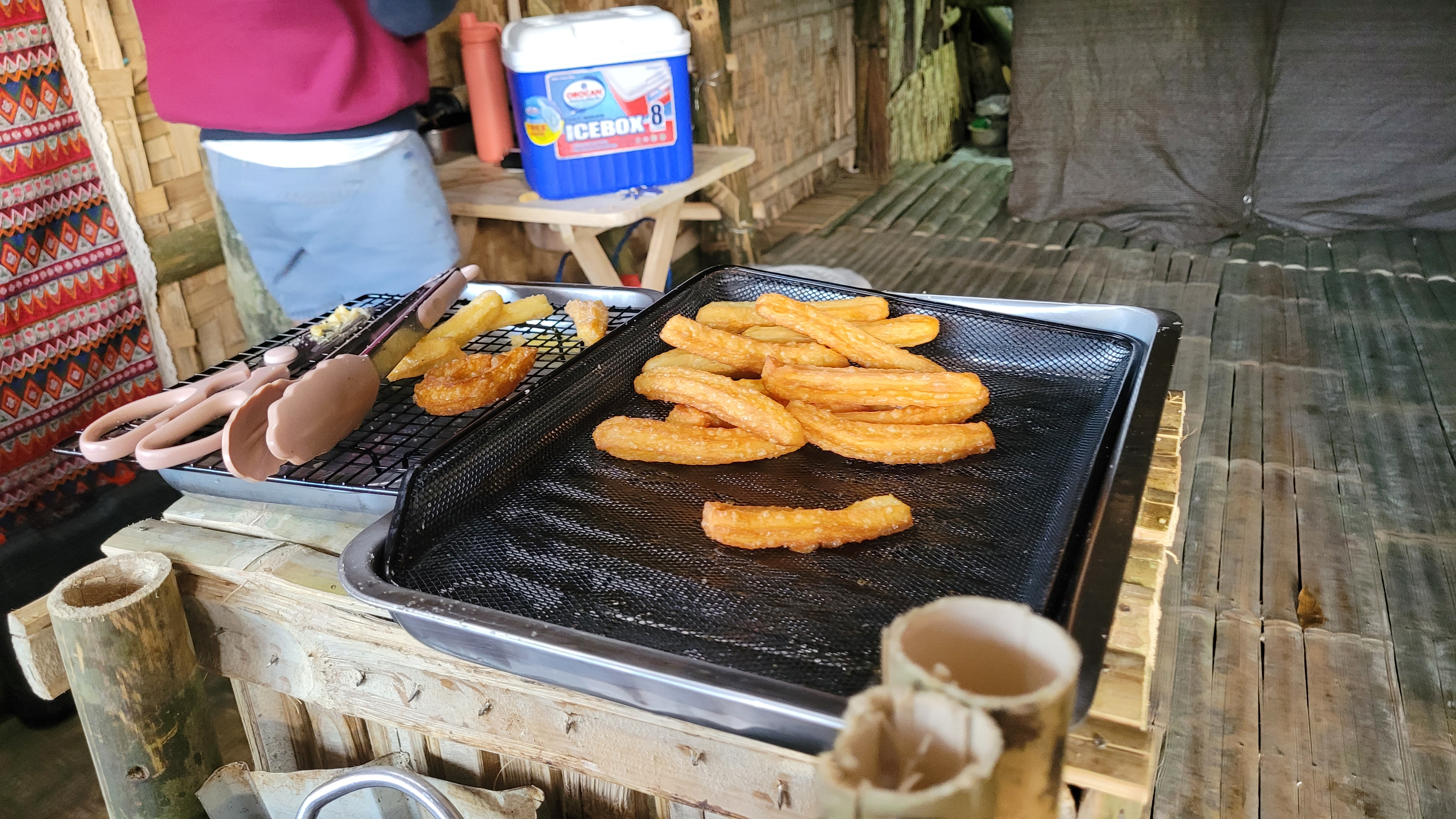
Churros in the Philippines

In Seville (Andalusia), the name "calientes" (meaning hot) or "calentitos de rueda" is sometimes used instead of the word churro. These tend to refer to the thicker variant, called porra. Calientes are usually fried in the shape of a continuous spiral and cut into portions afterwards. The center of the spiral is thicker and softer, and for many a delicacy in itself. The standard "churro" is also sold under the name "calentitos de papas", the name referring to the softer mashed potato-like texture.

In parts of eastern Andalusia, a much thinner dough is used, which does not allow for the typical ridges to be formed on the surface of the churro. The final result therefore has a smooth surface, and is more pliable and of a slightly thinner diameter than standard Spanish churros. Another difference is that sugar is never sprinkled on them, because the flavour is not considered suitable.

Filled, straight churros are found in Cuba (with fruit, such as guava), Brazil (with chocolate, doce de leite, among others), and in Argentina, Bolivia, Peru, Chile, Mexico (usually filled with dulce de leche or cajeta but also with chocolate and vanilla), and in Colombia and Venezuela (with bocadillo, arequipe or sweetened condensed milk). In Spain, a considerably wider diameter is used to accommodate the filling.

In Uruguay, churros can also come in a savoury version, filled with melted cheese.

In the Philippines, churros are typically straight, or bent into U-shapes or circular shapes dusted with white sugar and are popular during Christmas.

In Thailand, churros are commonly referred to as Patonggo Spain (Thai: ปาท่องโก๋สเปน, lit. 'Spanish deep-fried dough stick'). The fried dough itself is originally called youtiao in Chinese, but it is known locally in Thailand as patonggo.

Churros in American theme parks and street fairs are most often rolled in cinnamon sugar or other flavored sugars.

== Similar dishes ==
=== Karabeej Halab ===
In the Middle East, a churro-like fried dough-based sweet is known as Karabeej Halab (Arabic: كرابيج حلب, lit. 'Whips of Aleppo'). It is made using semolina flour, and is dipped into a sugar and rose water syrup after it is deep fried. It originates from Syrian cuisine and is especially popular in the month of Ramadan.

=== Youtiao ===
Youtiao, a traditional Chinese fried dough with a long history. It is well known in Thailand as Patonggo.

== In popular culture ==
The Mexican sitcom El Chavo del Ocho featured a 3-episode saga in 1978 titled La Venta de Churros with churros as the main theme. The popularity of this saga has led people to frequently associate churros with the series, to the point of even selling them using the characters' images to boost sales.

The character of Josh Nichols from the TV show Drake & Josh is infatuated with churros.

There is a churro character from Rick and Morty named Churry, at Season 7 Episode 6.

== See also ==
- Andalusian cuisine
- Fartura
- Free Churro
- Gorgoria
- List of doughnut varieties
- List of fried dough foods
- Tulumba
