= Untir-untir =

Indonesian deep-fried twisted doughnut

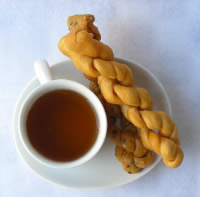
- Untir-untir or kue tambang.
- Alternative names: Kue tambang
- Type: Doughnut
- Place of origin: Indonesia
- Region or state: Java
- Main ingredients: Dough, peanut oil

Untir-untir or kue tambang is a traditional Indonesian deep-fried twisted doughnut—that fried in peanut oil. This dish has a shiny and golden look with crispy taste, almost similar to mahua in Chinese cuisine and lubid-lubid in Filipino cuisine. In Javanese untir-untir means "twisted", while in Indonesian kue tambang means "rope cake"; both refer to its twisted rope-like shape. This doughnut popular in Javanese community in Java, but today it can found nationwide. Sesame seeds can be added in the untir-untir.

== See also ==
- Cakwe
- Shakoy
- Chinese Indonesian cuisine
- Javanese cuisine
- Kue
- List of Indonesian dishes
- List of Indonesian snacks
