= Ham chim peng =

Chinese fried snack

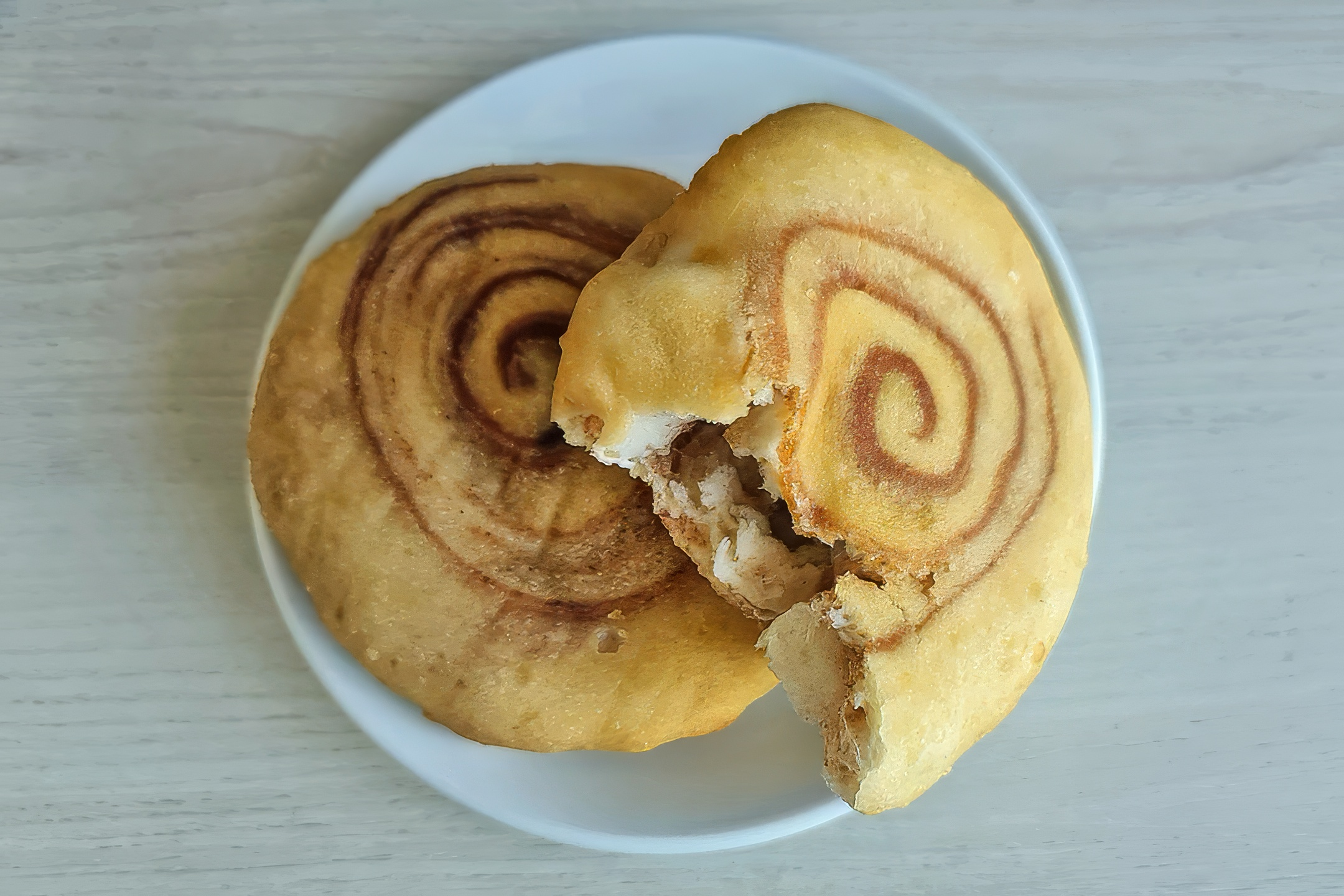
- Red bean paste ham chim peng
- Alternative names: Hum chim peng
- Place of origin: Southern China
- Region or state: Southeast Asia
- Main ingredients: flour; sesame seeds
- Similar dishes: Youtiao, Jian dui, Ox-tongue pastry

Ham chim peng (traditional Chinese: 鹹煎餅; simplified Chinese: 咸煎饼; pinyin: xiánjiānbǐng; Jyutping: haam4 zin1 beng2; lit. 'salty fried pancake'), also known in Singapore and Malaysia as haam ji peng, hum ji peng, among other variations, is a fried Cantonese pastry popular through Southeast Asia. Commonly eaten as a breakfast food, it is sometimes fried with a coating of sesame seeds.

There are at least 3 varieties of ham chin peng - with glutinous rice, five spice powder and red bean paste.

The pastry is eaten throughout Southeast Asia, where it is known as Indonesian: kue bantal, and Vietnamese: bánh tiêu, among others.

== See also ==
- List of doughnut varieties
- List of fried dough varieties
- Beignet

=== Other Chinese fried dough dishes ===
- Ox-tongue pastry
- Shuangbaotai
- Youtiao
