= Youtiao =

Deep-fried pastry of Chinese origin

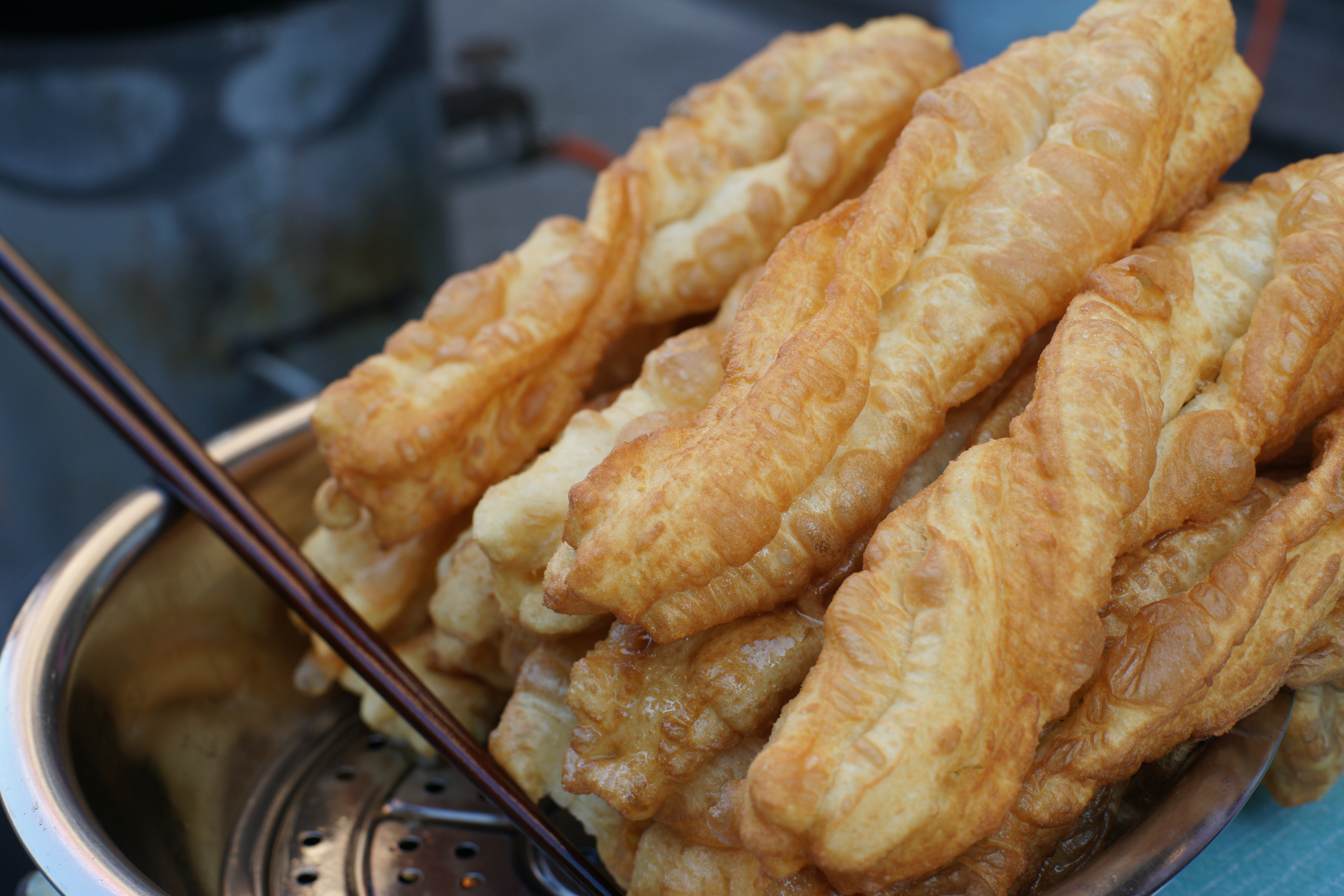
- Pieces of youtiao
- Alternative names: Chinese cruller
- Type: Donut
- Course: Breakfast
- Place of origin: China
- Region or state: Guangdong
- Associated cuisine: Several east and south-east Asian cuisines
- Main ingredients: Dough

Youtiao

Chinese name
- Traditional Chinese: 油條
- Simplified Chinese: 油条
- Literal meaning: oil strip
Transcriptions
Standard Mandarin
- Hanyu Pinyin: yóutiáo
- Wade–Giles: yu^{2}-t'iao^{2}
Wu
- Romanization: hhieu diau (T3)
Hakka
- Romanization: yiu tiao
Yue: Cantonese
- Yale Romanization: yàuh tíu
- Jyutping: jau⁴ tiu⁴*²

Yu Char Kway
- Traditional Chinese: 油炸粿/餜/鬼
- Simplified Chinese: 油炸粿/馃/鬼
- Literal meaning: oil-fried pastry (or devil)
Transcriptions
Standard Mandarin
- Hanyu Pinyin: yóuzháguǒ
- Wade–Giles: yu^{2}-cha^{2}-kuo^{3}
Hakka
- Romanization: yiu za gui
Yue: Cantonese
- Yale Romanization: yàuh ja gwái
- Jyutping: jau⁴ zaa³ gwai²
Southern Min
- Hokkien POJ: iû-chiā-kóe

Guozi
- Traditional Chinese: 餜子
- Simplified Chinese: 馃子
- Literal meaning: pastry
Transcriptions
Standard Mandarin
- Hanyu Pinyin: guǒzi
- Wade–Giles: kuo^{3}-tzu^{0}

Burmese name
- Burmese: အီကြာ‌ကွေး Ee Kyar Kway

Vietnamese name
- Vietnamese: dầu cháo quẩy / giò cháo quẩy

Thai name
- Thai: ปาท่องโก๋
- RTGS: pathongko

Malay name
- Malay: cakoi چاکوي

Indonesian name
- Indonesian: cakwe

Filipino name
- Tagalog: bítso-bítso/bicho-bicho/shakoy

Lao name
- Lao: ເຂົ້າຫນົມຄູ່ / ຂະໜົມຄູ່ /ຈັບກ້ວຍ; Khao nom khu / kha nom khu / chab kuay

Khmer name
- Khmer: ឆាខ្វៃ / យ៉ាវឆាខ្វៃ Chha Khwai / Yav Chha Khwai

Youtiao (Chinese: 油條), known in Southern China as yau char kway (Chinese: 油炸鬼), is a long golden-brown deep-fried strip of wheat flour dough of Chinese origin and (by a variety of other names) also popular in other East and Southeast Asian cuisines.

Conventionally, youtiao are lightly salted and easily separated by hand. youtiao are normally eaten at breakfast as an accompaniment for rice congee, soy milk or cow's milk blended with sugar. youtiao may also be known as a Chinese cruller, Chinese oil stick, Chinese donut [sticks], and fried breadstick, among others.

In other Asian countries, they may also be called bicho, you char kway, cakwe, cakoi, kueh, kuay, shakoy or pathongko, among other names.

== Culinary applications and variants ==
At breakfast, youtiao can be stuffed inside shāobǐng (traditional Chinese: 燒餅; simplified Chinese: 烧饼; lit. 'roasted flatbread') to make a sandwich known as shāobǐng yóutiáo (traditional Chinese: 燒餅油條; simplified Chinese: 烧饼油条). Youtiao wrapped in a rice noodle roll is known as zháliǎng. In Yunnan, a roasted rice flour pancake usually wrapped around a youtiao is known as erkuai (traditional Chinese: 燒餌塊; simplified Chinese: 烧饵块). Yet another name for a sandwich variant is jianbingguǒzi (traditional Chinese: 煎餅果子; simplified Chinese: 煎饼果子; lit. 'youtiao and fried bread').

Youtiao is occasionally dipped into various liquids, for example the soup xidoufen, soy milk (sweet or salty), and soy sauce.

Youtiao is also an important ingredient of the food cífàn tuán in Shanghai cuisine.

Tánggāo (Chinese: 糖糕), or "sugar cake", is a sweet, fried food item similar in appearance to youtiao but shorter in length.

In Thailand, youtiao or pathongko (ปาท่องโก๋) in Thai are eaten for breakfast with soy milk or congee.

Similarly, in Indonesia youtiao or cakwe in Indonesian can be eaten for breakfast with porridge by chopping it into thin slices. Cakwe stands can also be found in the evening, usually eaten with a special liquid red sauce.

== Names ==
=== Cambodia ===
In Cambodia, it is called cha kway (Khmer: ឆាខ្វៃ) and usually dipped in kuy teav, congee or coffee. Some Chinese Cambodian immigrants in Australia sometimes call it chopstick cake because of its resemblance to a pair of chopsticks.

=== China ===
Although generally known as yóutiáo in Standard Mandarin, the dish is also known as guǒzi (餜子) in northern China. In Min Nan-speaking areas, such as Taiwan, it is known as iû-chiā-kóe (油炸粿), where kóe (粿/餜) means cake or pastry, hence "oil-fried cake/pastry". In Cantonese-speaking areas this is rendered as yàuh ja gwái (油炸鬼), where literally means "Oil-fried devil". (Note: Similarly, the dish known as [[char koay teow|chhá-koé-tiâu]] (炒粿條) in Minnan, kóe-tiâu being the Minnan name for flat rice noodles (literally "(rice) cake strips"), is on Cantonese menus rendered as 炒貴刁 (ja gwai dìu) where the characters 貴刁 (gwai dìu, literally expensive (Surname)) are equally meaningless. See Char koay teow: Etymology for more information.)

==== Folk etymology ====
The Cantonese name 油炸鬼 (Cantonese Yale: yàuh ja gwái) is, according to folklore, an act of protest against Song dynasty official Qin Hui, who is said to have orchestrated the plot to frame the general Yue Fei, an icon of patriotism in Chinese culture. It is said that the food, originally in the shape of two human-shaped pieces of dough but later evolved into two pieces joined in the middle, represents Qin Hui and his wife, both having a hand in collaborating with the enemy to bring about the great general's demise. Thus the youtiao is deep fried and eaten as if done to the traitorous couple. In Mandarin, the name 油炸燴 (pinyin: yóuzháhuì) from folklore literally means "oil-fried Hui" in protest of his actions. The Cantonese pronunciation yàuh ja gwái rhymes with this Mandarin pronunciation.

In keeping with the legend, youtiao are often made as two foot-long rolls of dough joined along the middle, with one roll representing the husband and the other the wife.

=== Indonesia ===
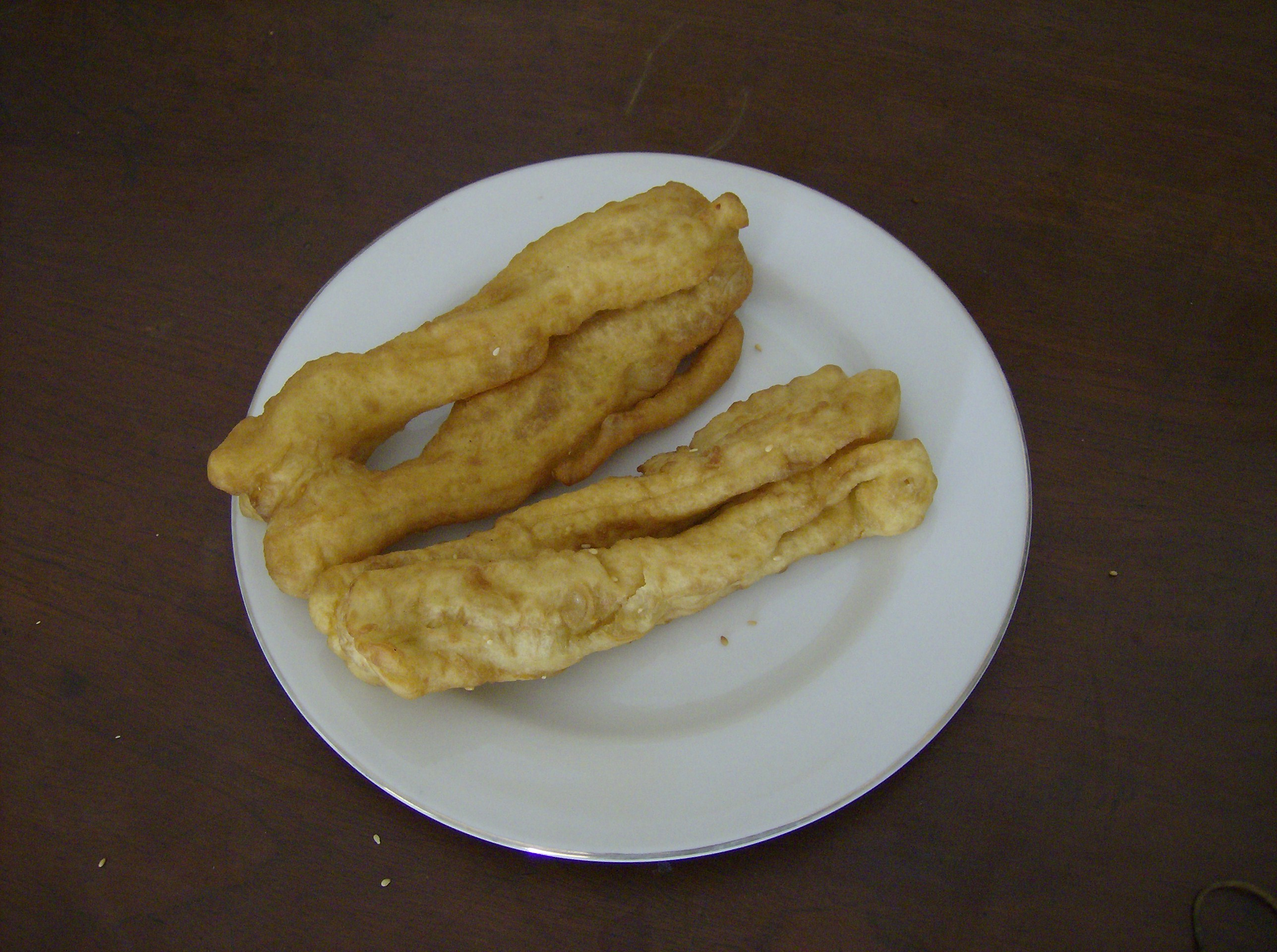
In Indonesia, the fried dough is known as cakwe and is commonly chopped or thinly sliced and then eaten for breakfast.

In Indonesia, the fried dough is known as cakwe (pronounced [tʃakwe]). It is commonly chopped or thinly sliced and then eaten for breakfast with bubur ayam (chicken congee) or eaten as snacks with dipping of local version of chilli vinaigrette or peanut / satay sauce.

In Java, cakwe is usually sold as a street snack at kaki lima, usually at the same stalls that sell bolang-baling or roti goreng (sweet fried dough) and untir-untir (Javanese version of mahua). This snack is sometime served with spicy sweet salty sauce (optional). Savory cakwe, sweet bolang-baling and crunchy untir-untir are to be considered to compliment each other in a snack mix.

=== Laos ===
In Laos, youtiao is generally called kao nom kou or patongko (cf. Thai patongko) or chao quay, and is commonly eaten with coffee at breakfast in place of a baguette (khao jee falang). It is also eaten as an accompaniment to khao piek sen (chicken noodle soup) or jok (congee).

=== Malaysia ===
It is rendered in Malay language as cakoi, an alteration of the Minnan term, char kway. The name pathongko (see Thailand) is more common in the northern states of Kedah, Perlis and Penang, kayu khamak or kuduh in Terengganu, kocok in Pahang and Perak and cakuwe in Kelantan. Cakoi is usually sold in morning street markets or night markets and commonly eaten with coffee or soy milk for breakfast or at tea time. It is also often a side dish eaten together with the bak kut teh, a signature local Chinese dish, by dipping small pieces of the youtiao into the flavourful broth of bak kut teh.

=== Myanmar ===
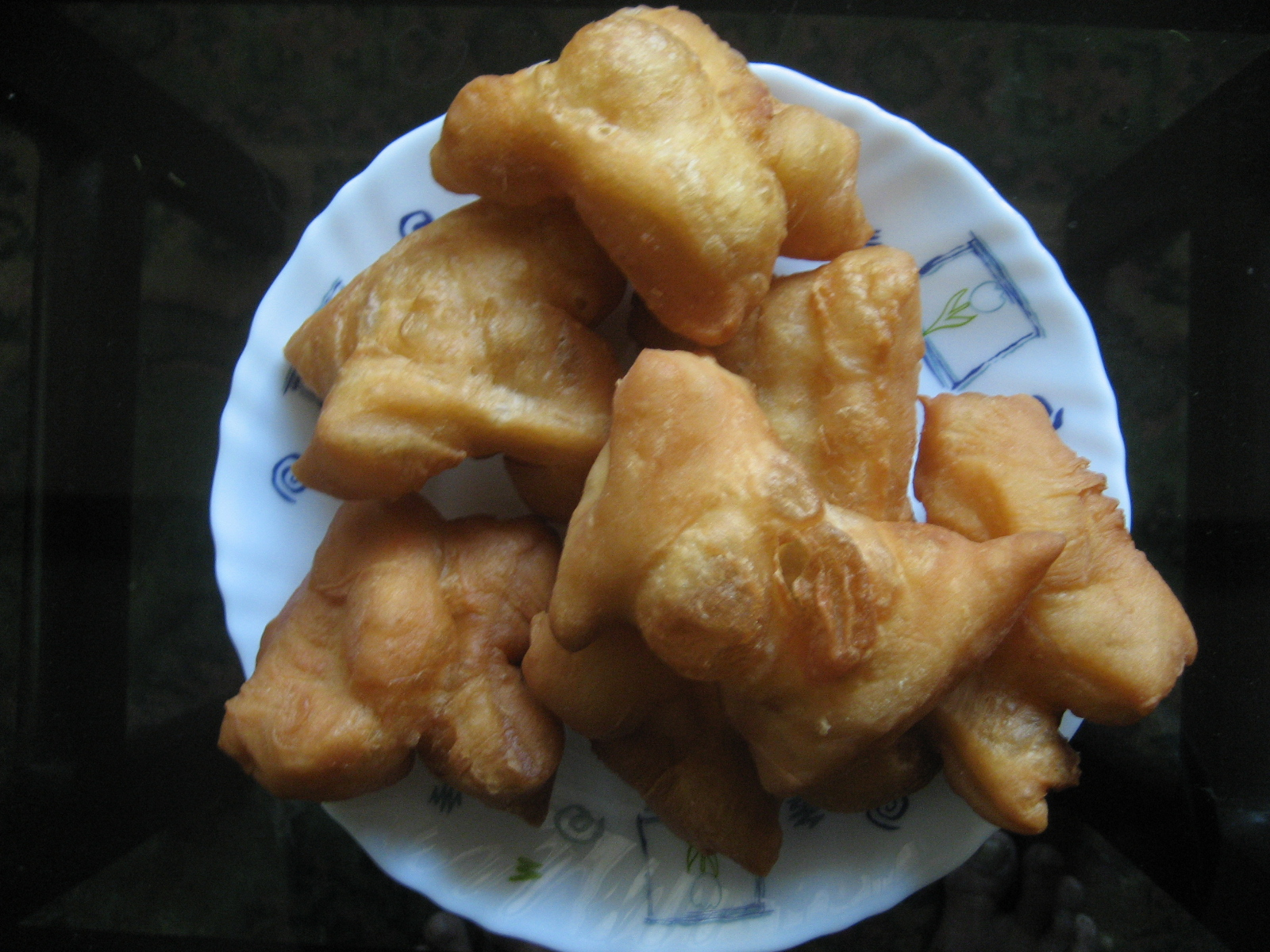
The youtiao is a popular breakfast food in Myanmar, where it is called e kya kway.

The youtiao is also a popular breakfast food in Myanmar, where it is called e kya kway (အီကြာကွေး [ì tʒà ku̯éː]). It is usually eaten with steamed yellow beans (with salt and oil) or dipped into coffee or tea, or with condensed milk (နို့ဆီ). E kya kway is also eaten with rice porridge, or cut into small rings and used as a condiment for mohinga. Tea culture is prevalent in Myanmar, and almost every shop will serve e kya kway for breakfast.

Some shops stuff meat into the youtiao and deep fry it over again. It is called e kya kway asar thoot – stuffed e kya kway.

=== Philippines ===
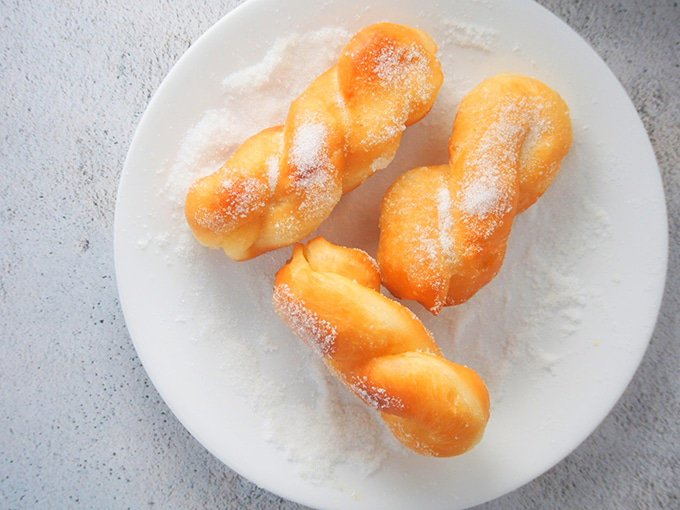
Shakoy/Bicho from the Philippines

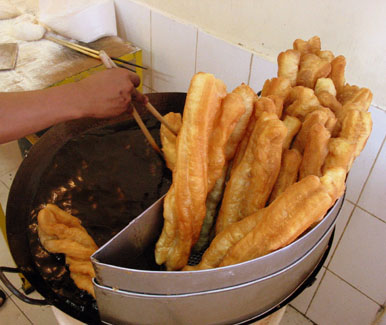
Bicho-Bicho from the Philippines

In the Philippines, it is either known as Bicho / Bicho-Bicho (Hokkien: 米棗 Pe̍h-ōe-jī: bí-tsó) or Shakoy / Siyakoy (Hokkien: 炸粿 Pe̍h-ōe-jī: tsia̍h-kué) / Pinisi / lubid-lubid. They are usually deep-fried, in the case of Bicho-Bicho, or deep-fried and twisted, in the case of Shakoy. Dry, smaller and crunchy versions are called pilipit.

=== Singapore ===
In Singapore, it is known as yu char kway, which is the transliteration of its Hokkien (Minnan) name (油炸粿 iû-tsiā-kué). Apart from the plain version, the Singaporean take on youtiao also comes with various fillings which are either sweet, such as red bean paste or savory (ham chim peng, 鹹煎餅), such as sardines in tomato sauce. The plain version is often eaten with sweet chili sauce or coconut and egg jam called kaya, or served with bak kut teh (肉骨茶), porridge or rice congee, sliced thinly to be dipped into the broth or congee and eaten.

=== Taiwan ===
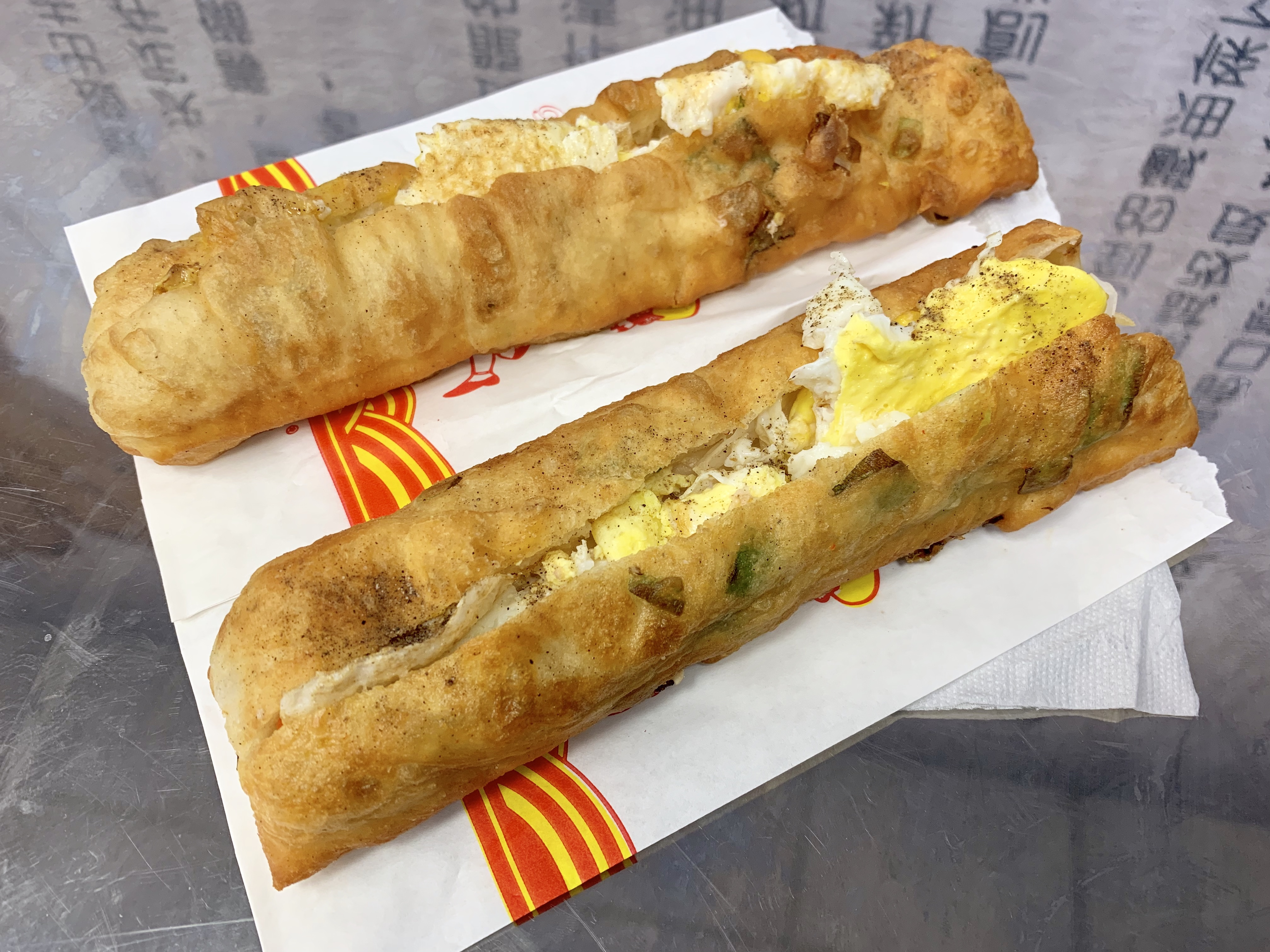
Fried egg sandwiched in youtiao

In Taiwan, youtiao is often known by its Hokkien name (油炸粿 iû-tsiā-kué) and is a popular breakfast item throughout Taiwan. Youtiao are usually sandwiched into shaobings or cut into sections and wrapped in rice balls, or eaten with almond milk, soy milk, and douhua for breakfast. It is also an essential ingredient for Tainan-style congee and salty soy milk, and it is also featured in Tainan beef soup and as a side for Taiwanese-style spicy hot pot.

=== Thailand ===
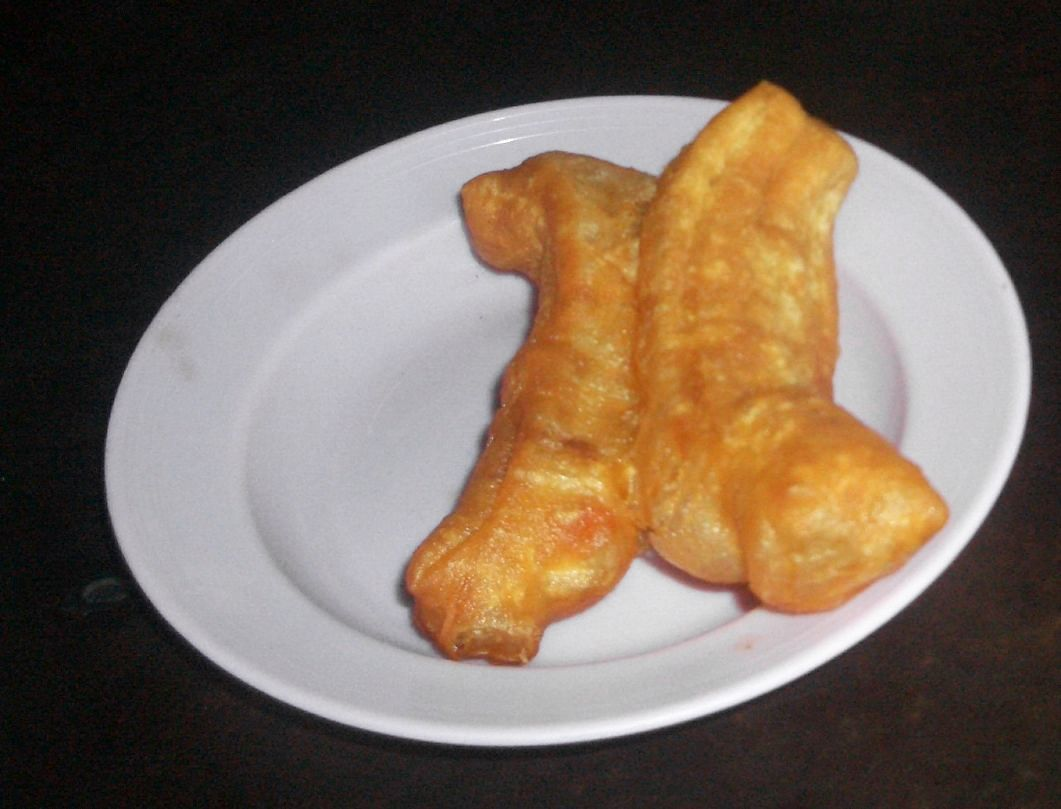
Thai youtiao

In Thailand, youtiao is generally called pathongko (Thai: ปาท่องโก๋, pronounced [paːtʰɔ̂ŋkǒː]) due to a confusion with a different kind of dessert. Pathongko is a loanword adapted from either Teochew Minnan beh teung guai (白糖粿; Mandarin: bái tángguǒ) or Cantonese of baahktònggòu (白糖糕; Mandarin: bái tánggāo). However, both possible original names referred to a different dessert, the white sugar sponge cake. It was previously sold together with youtiao by street vendors who normally walked around and shouted both names out loud. However, Thai customers often mistakenly thought that the more popular youtiao was pathongko. Eventually, the real pathongko disappeared from the market because of its unpopularity. The disappearance of real pathongko left the youtiao labeled under the former's name, while the latter's real name is generally unknown amongst the Thais. The original white sugar sponge cake can still be easily found in Ranong Phangnga Phuket Trang Krabi and Satun in Southern Thailand under its original name while youtiao is still called chakoi or chiakoi by some Southerners.

In Thailand, pathongko is often dipped in condensed milk or, in the southern regions, served with kaya. In certain provinces, such as Chanthaburi and Kanchanaburi, it is eaten with a sweet-and-sour dipping sauce, which is considered a local delicacy.

=== Vietnam ===
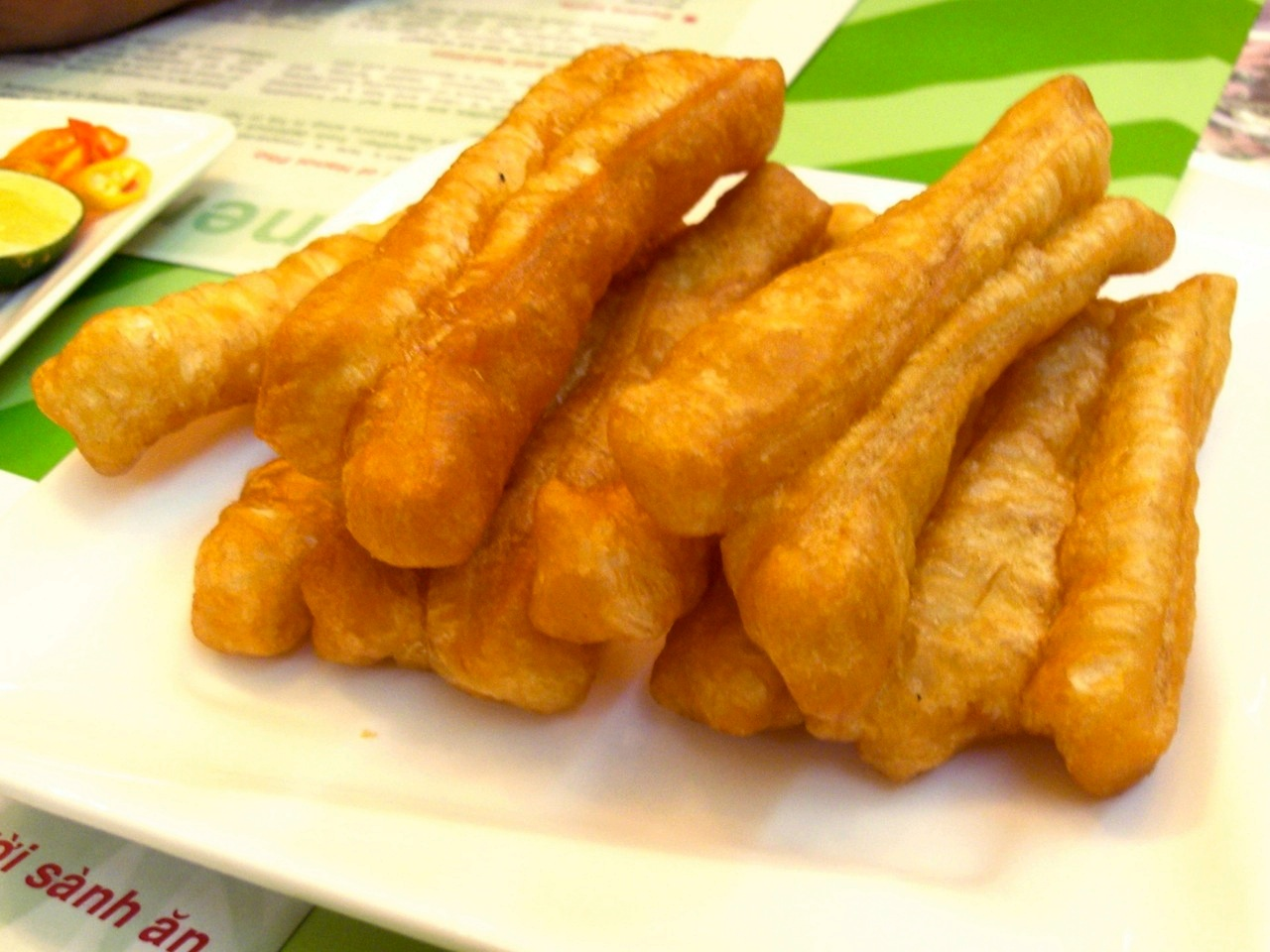
Quẩy

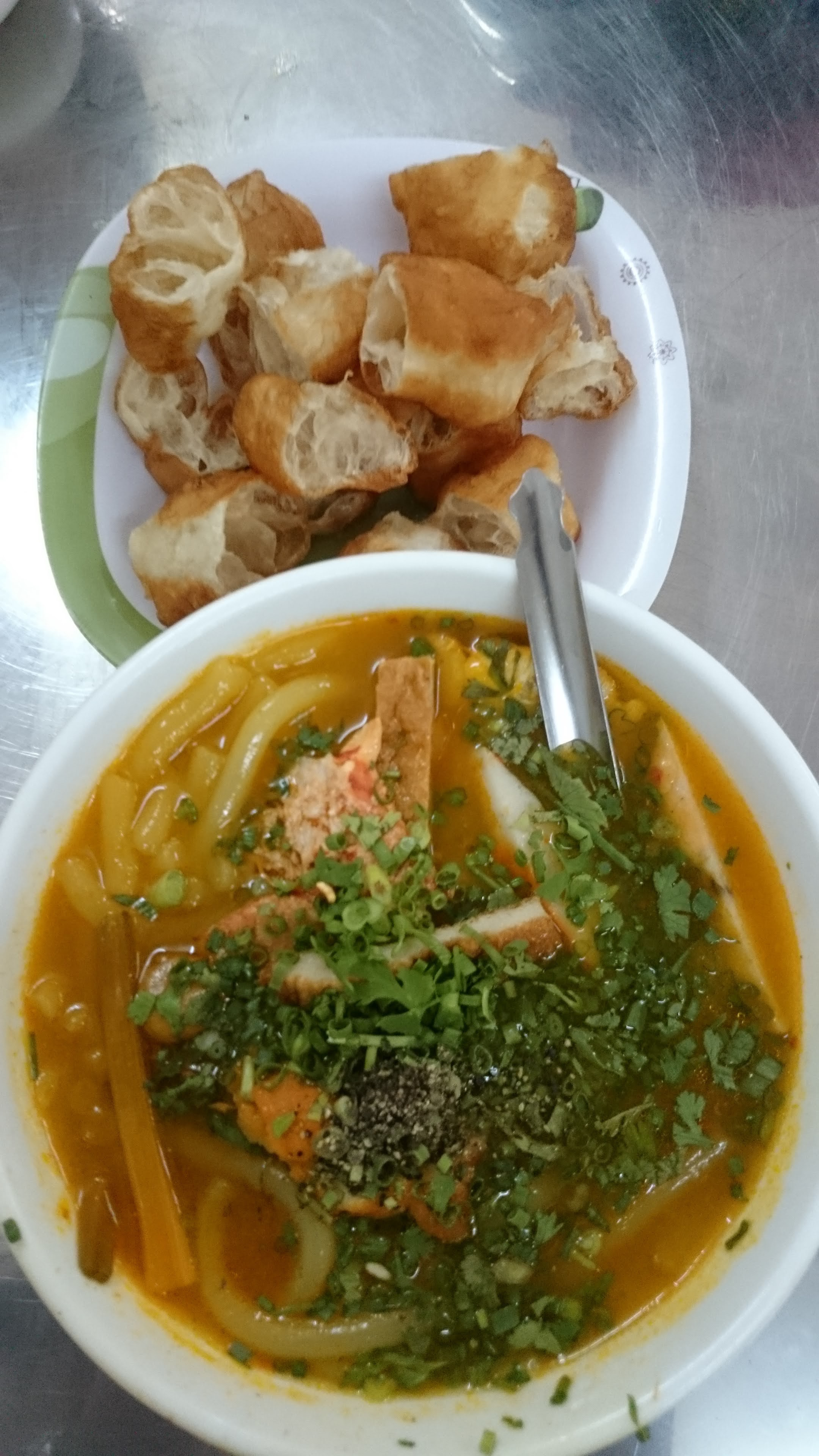
Bánh canh cua with cut quẩy as side topping

In Vietnamese cuisine, it is known by a name that is a pronunciation similar to the Cantonese pronunciation, as dầu cháo quẩy, giò cháo quẩy or simply quẩy. 油 ("dầu/giò"), 鬼 ("quỷ/quẩy") coming from the approximate Cantonese pronunciation. In Vietnam, giò cháo quẩy is eaten typically with congee or phở in Hanoi, and sometimes with wonton noodle (mì hoành thánh or mì vằn thắn). In Southern Vietnam, quẩy is often eaten with bánh canh cua, or dipped in hot soymilk as a quick breakfast.

== See also ==
- Fried dough foods
- List of Chinese dishes
- List of doughnut varieties
- List of deep-fried foods
- List of snack foods
- List of street foods
- Zhaliang
- Ci fan tuan

=== Other Chinese fried dough dishes ===
- Ham chim peng
- Ox-tongue pastry
- Shuangbaotai
