= Ox-tongue pastry =

Chinese fried pastry

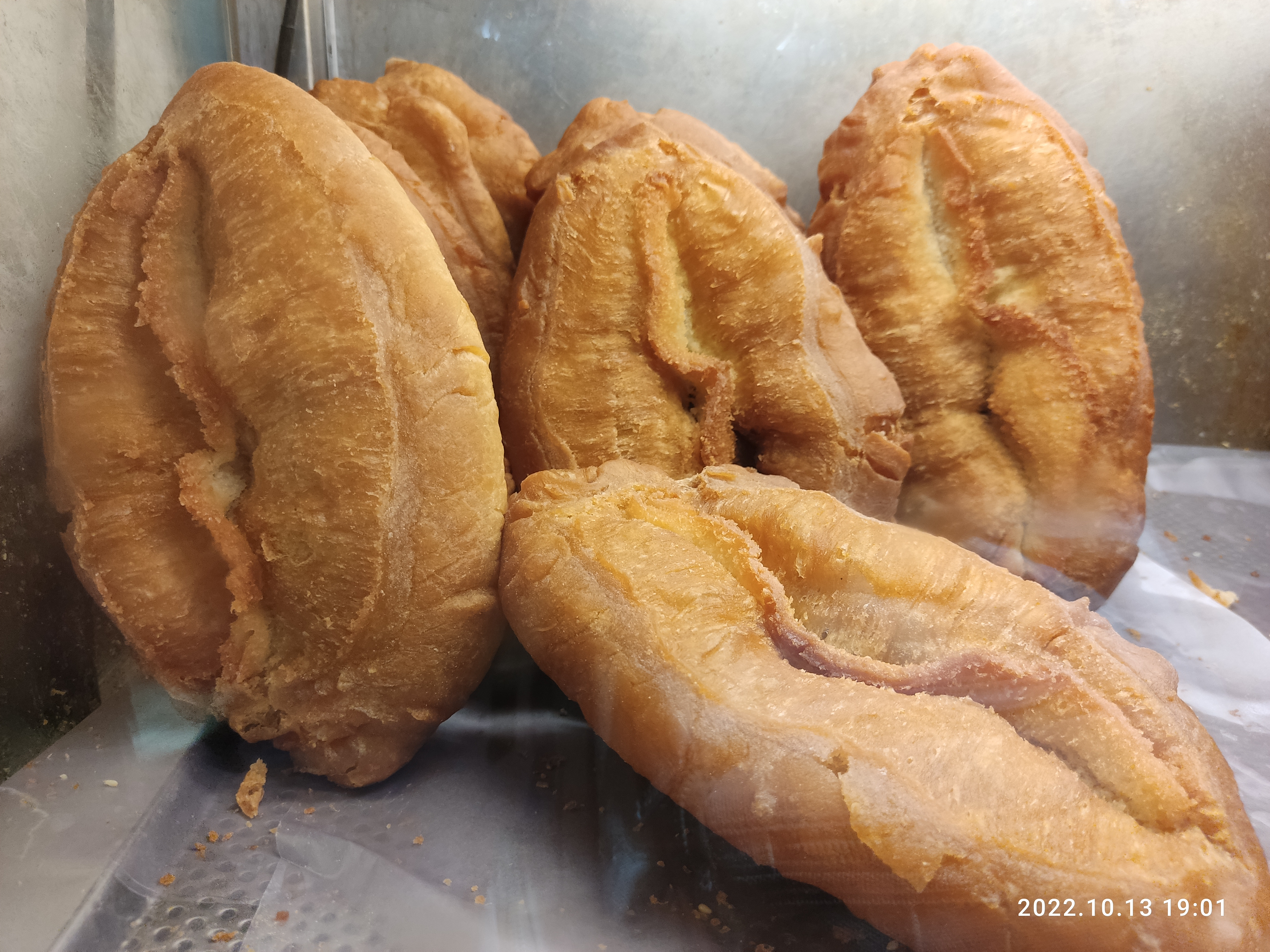
- An ox-tongue pastry that is available in congee restaurants in Hong Kong
- Alternative names: Horse-ear pastry
- Type: Doughnut
- Place of origin: Guangdong or Fujian, China
- Main ingredients: fried dough

Ox-tongue pastry
- Chinese: 牛脷酥
Transcriptions
Standard Mandarin
- Hanyu Pinyin: niúlìsū
Yue: Cantonese
- Jyutping: ngau4 lei6 sou1

Ox-tongue pastry (Chinese: 牛脷酥; pinyin: niúlìsū; Jyutping: ngau^{4} lei^{6} sou^{1}) or horse-ear pastry (Chinese: 馬耳; pinyin: mǎěr), is a Chinese fried dough food that is popular in south China in the provinces of Guangdong and Fujian. It is elliptical in shape and resembles an ox tongue or a horse ear. The doughnut texture is chewy, with a soft interior and a crunchy crust. Ox-tongue pastry is lightly sweetened, and eaten as part of breakfast with soy milk. The doughnut is made in a similar way as Youtiao, with sugar typically added to the flour.

== See also ==
- List of doughnut varieties
- List of fried dough varieties
- Mandazi, a similar East African pastry

=== Other Chinese fried dough dishes ===
- Ham chim peng
- Shuangbaotai
- Youtiao
