= Shuangbaotai =

Taiwanese crispy, deep-fried dough of Hokchew origin

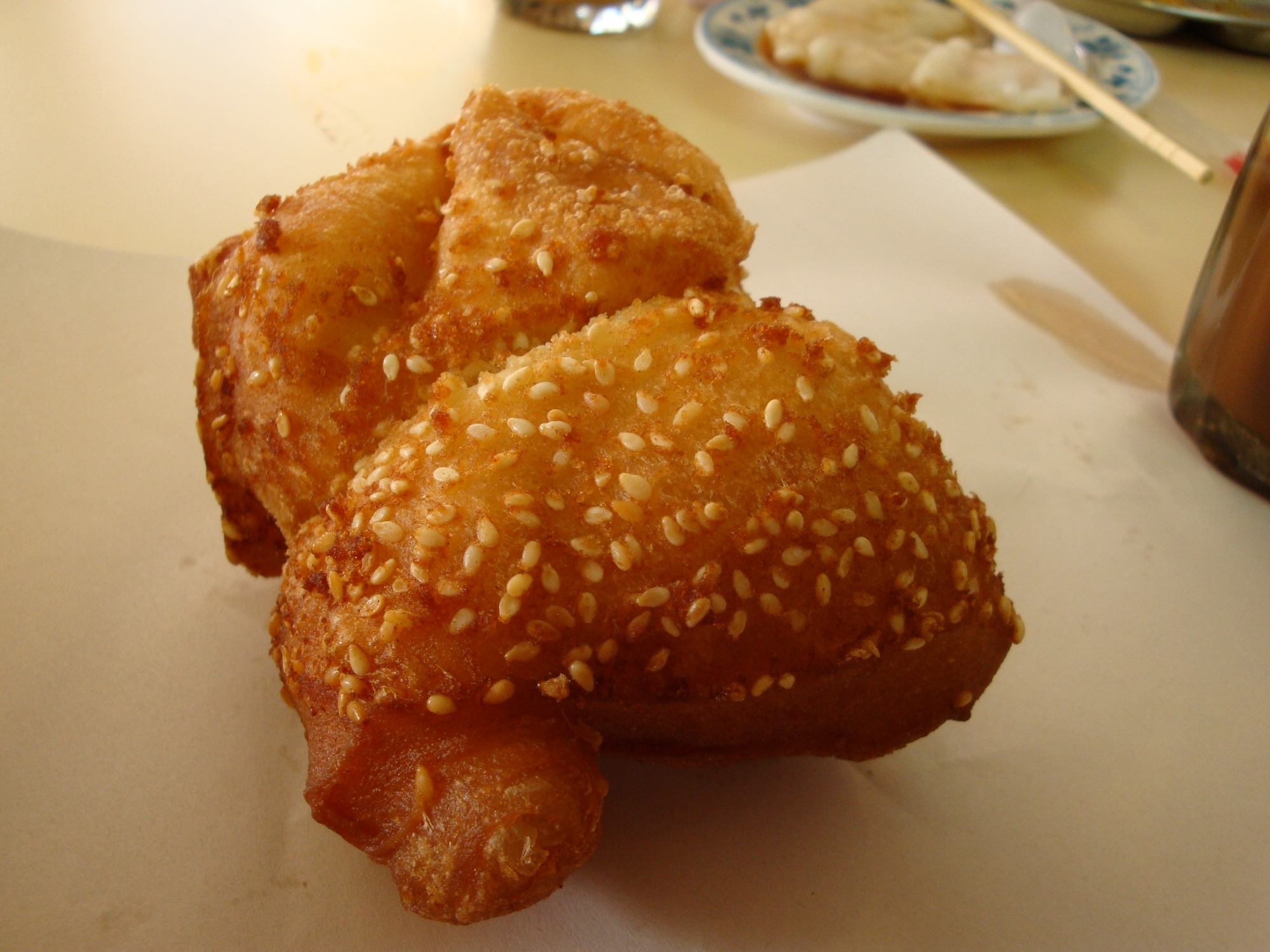
- Fried shuangbaotai with sesame seeds
- Type: Doughnut
- Place of origin: Fuzhou
- Main ingredients: Dough

雙胞胎
- Traditional Chinese: 雙胞胎
- Simplified Chinese: 双胞胎
- Literal meaning: twins
Transcriptions
Standard Mandarin
- Hanyu Pinyin: shuāngbāotāi
Yue: Cantonese
- Jyutping: soeng1 baau1 toi1

Minnan name
- Traditional Chinese: 馬花糋
- Simplified Chinese: 马花糋
- Literal meaning: horse hoof cake
Transcriptions
Standard Mandarin
- Hanyu Pinyin: mǎhuājiàn
Southern Min
- Hokkien POJ: bé-hoe-chìⁿ

Shuangbaotai (simplified Chinese: 双胞胎; traditional Chinese: 雙胞胎; pinyin: shuāngbāotāi) is a sweet fried dough food of Hokchew origin commonly found as a Taiwanese street food. It is a chewy fried dough containing large air pockets on the inside and a crisp crust on the outside. It is made by twisting two small pieces of dough together and frying them, causing them to separate slightly while remaining connected.

== Names ==
The Mandarin Chinese name of this food, shuāngbāotāi (Chinese: 雙胞胎) meaning "twins", is derived from the fact that the dish is two pastries twisted slightly together as if conjoined twins. The Taiwanese Hokkien name is 馬花糋 (bé-hoe-chìⁿ), which roughly means "horse-hoof cake", also in reference to its shape. Another Hokkien name is 雙生仔 (siang-siⁿ-á) meaning twins.

== Regional ==
In Taiwan, shuangbaotai are a type of snack (xiaochi) typically sold by hawkers at street stalls or in night markets, but not in regular restaurants or bakeries.

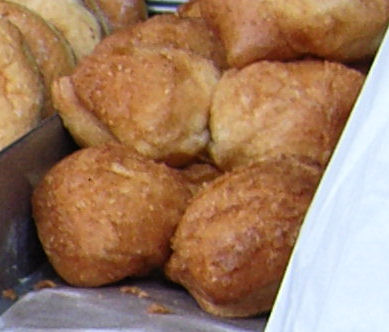
Shuangbaotai sold as xiaochi street food

== See also ==
- Taiwanese cuisine
- Fuzhou cuisine
- Fujian cuisine
- List of desserts
- List of doughnut varieties
- List of fried dough varieties

=== Other Chinese fried dough dishes ===
- Ham chim peng
- Ox-tongue pastry
- Youtiao
