= Xidoufen =

Chinese soup dish

Xidoufen (稀豆粉) is a Chinese soup popular in Yunnan province that is made of boiled pea meal, often flavoured with crushed garlic, ginger, coriander, spring onion, dry chilli flakes and Sichuan pepper oil. It is often eaten with deep fried youtiao or Chinese flatbreads, particularly cong you bing.
