= Binangkal =

Philippine doughnut

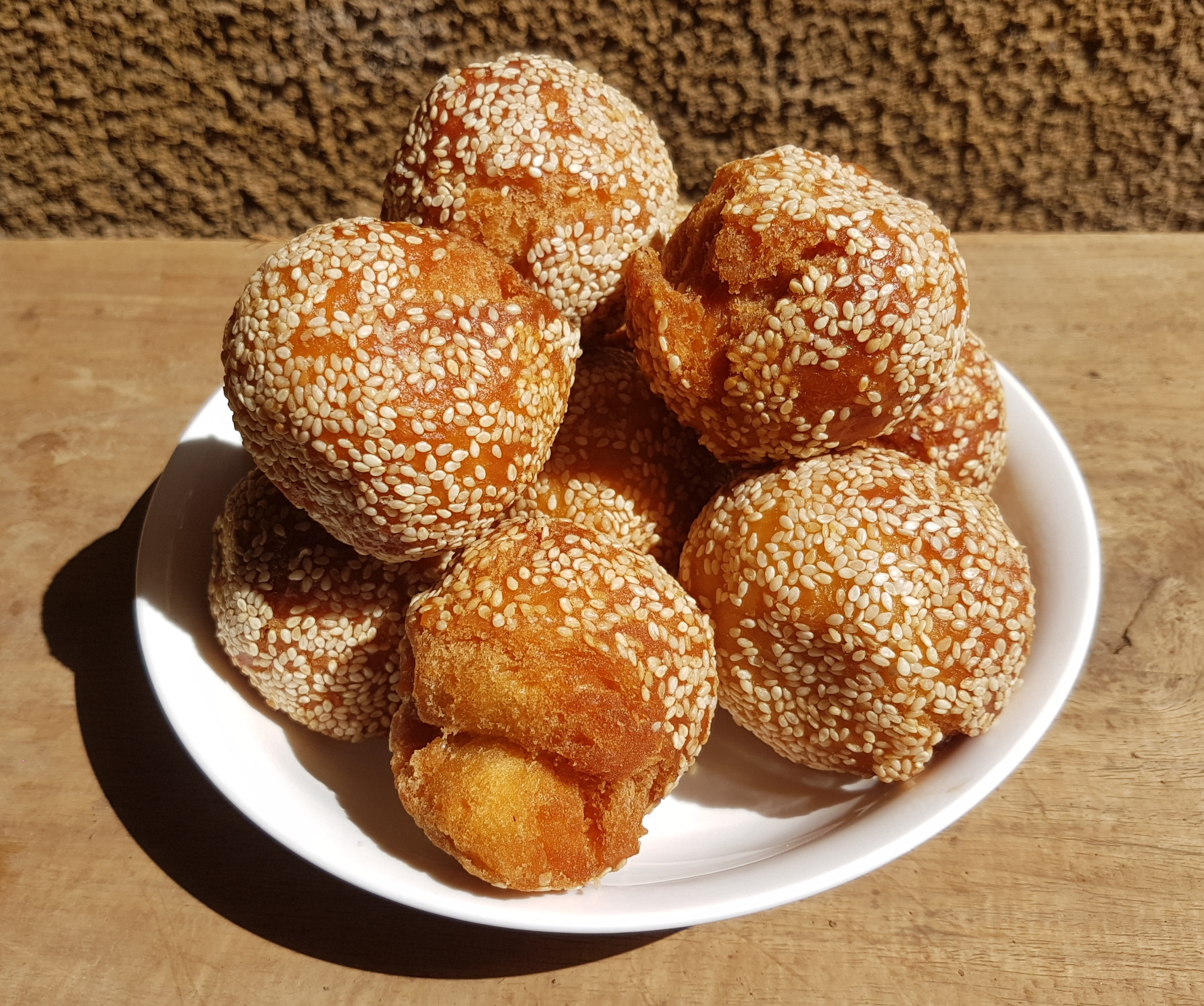
- Alternative names: kabak
- Course: Snack
- Place of origin: Philippines
- Region or state: Visayas, Mindanao
- Serving temperature: Warm, room temperature
- Main ingredients: flour, baking powder, baking soda, sugar, egg or evaporated milk, sesame seeds

Binangkal is a type of doughnut from the islands of Visayas and Mindanao in the Philippines. It is made from deep-fried dense dough balls coated with sesame seeds. It is usually eaten with hot chocolate or coffee.

The name is derived from bangkal, the local Cebuano common name for the Leichhardt tree (Nauclea orientalis) which bears spherical flowers and fruits.

== See also ==
- Shakoy
- Pilipit
- List of doughnut varieties
- List of sesame seed dishes
