= Zhaliang =

Cantonese dish

Fried dough noodle rolls
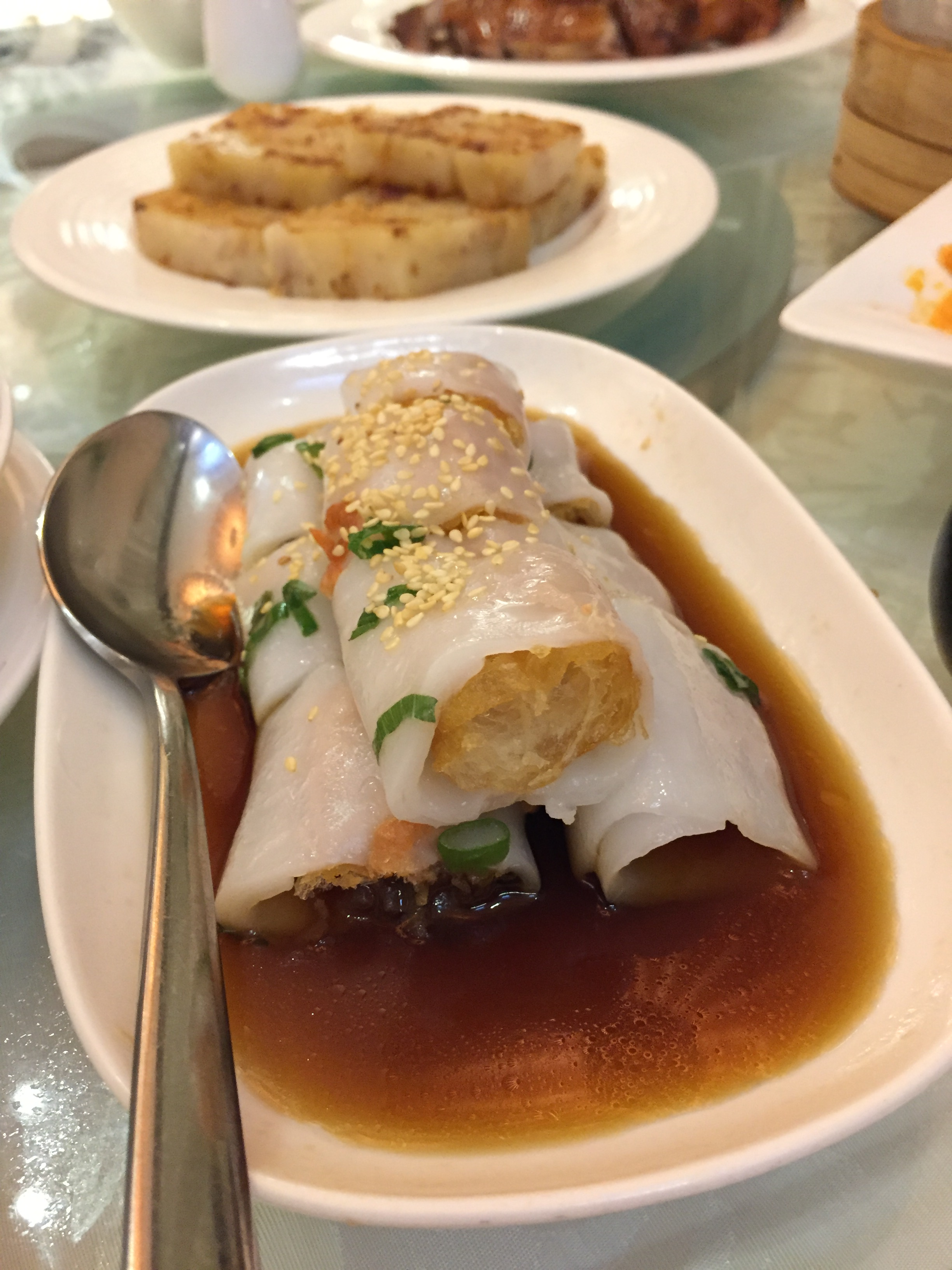
- Course: Dim sum, breakfast
- Place of origin: China
- Region or state: Guangdong province
- Main ingredients: rice noodle roll, youtiao

Zhaliang
- Traditional Chinese: 炸兩
- Simplified Chinese: 炸两
- Jyutping: zaa3 loeng2
- Hanyu Pinyin: zháliǎng
- Literal meaning: fried two
Transcriptions
Standard Mandarin
- Hanyu Pinyin: zháliǎng
Yue: Cantonese
- Yale Romanization: jaléung
- Jyutping: zaa3 loeng2

Zhaliang or jaleung (traditional Chinese: 炸兩; simplified Chinese: 炸两; Jyutping: zaa3 loeng2; Cantonese Yale: jaléung; lit. 'fried two' is a Cantonese dim sum. It is made by tightly wrapping rice noodle roll around youtiao (fried dough). It can be found in Chinese restaurants in Guangdong, Hong Kong, Macau and Malaysia.

It is often served doused in soy sauce, hoisin sauce or sesame paste and sprinkled with sesame seeds. It is usually eaten with soy milk or congee.

== Gallery ==
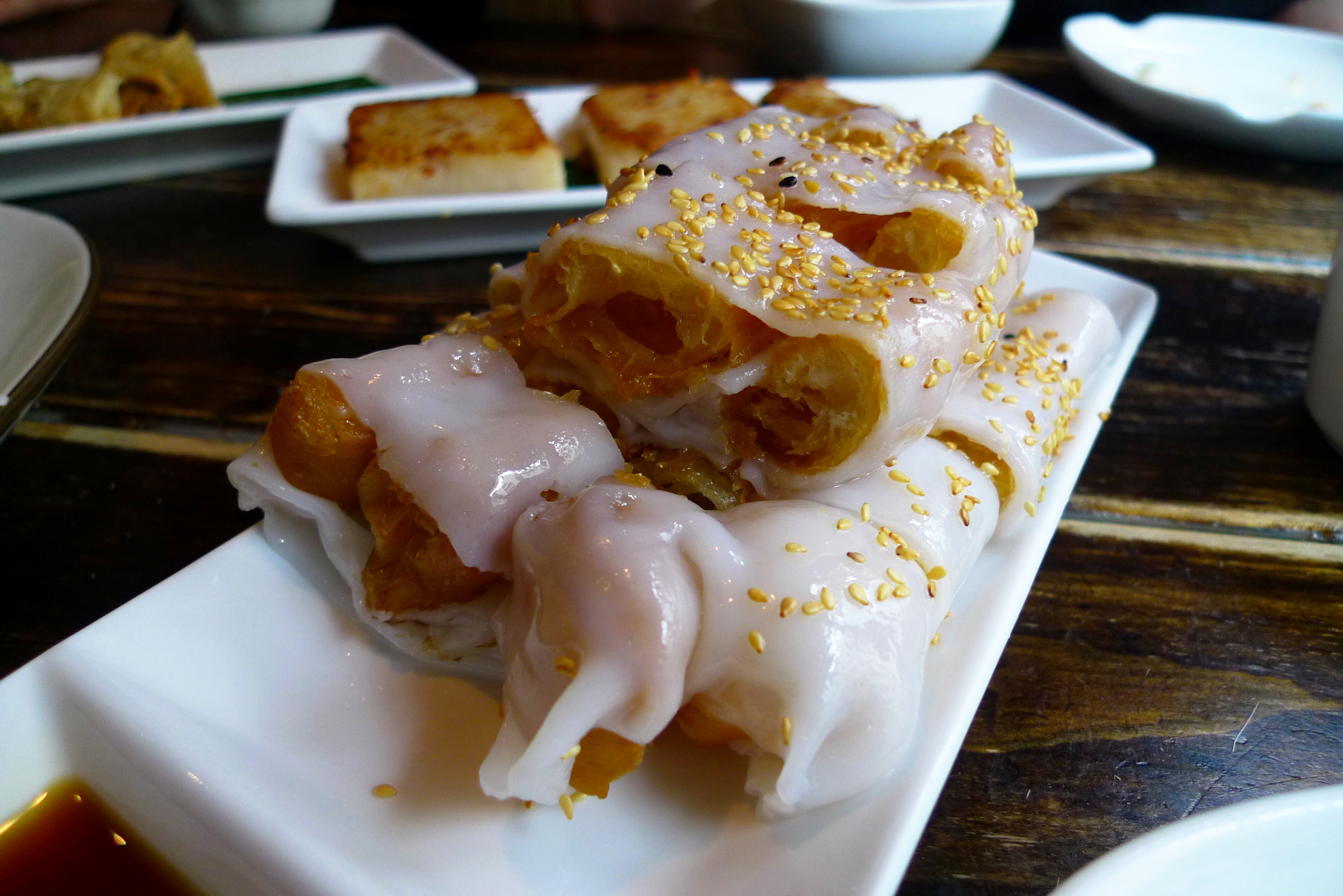

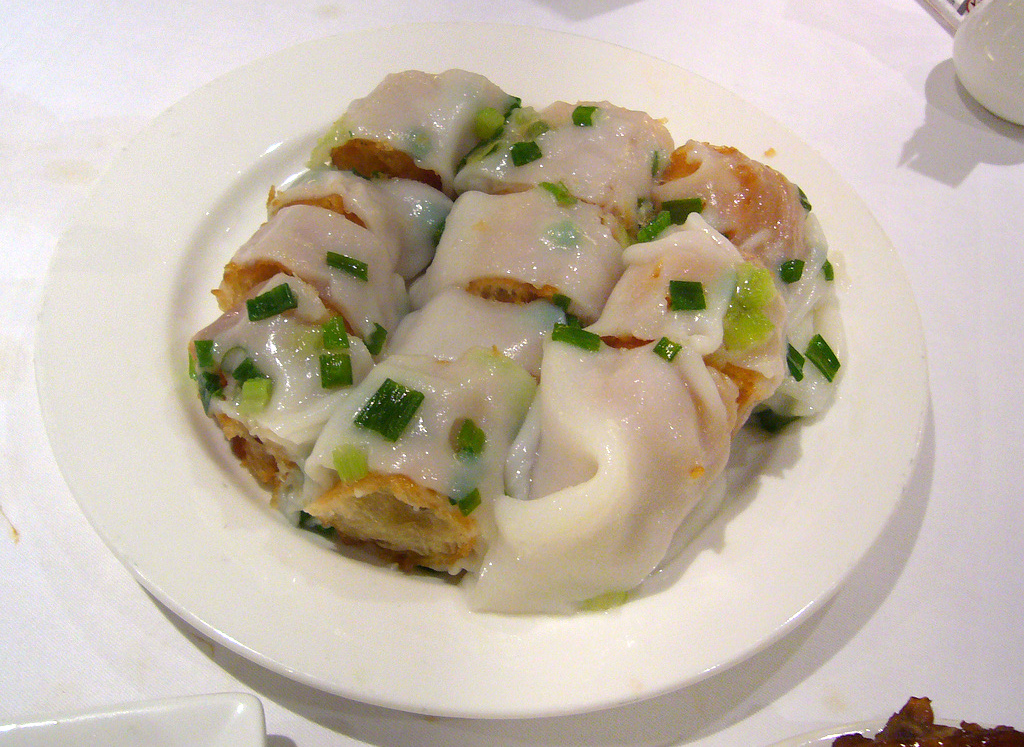

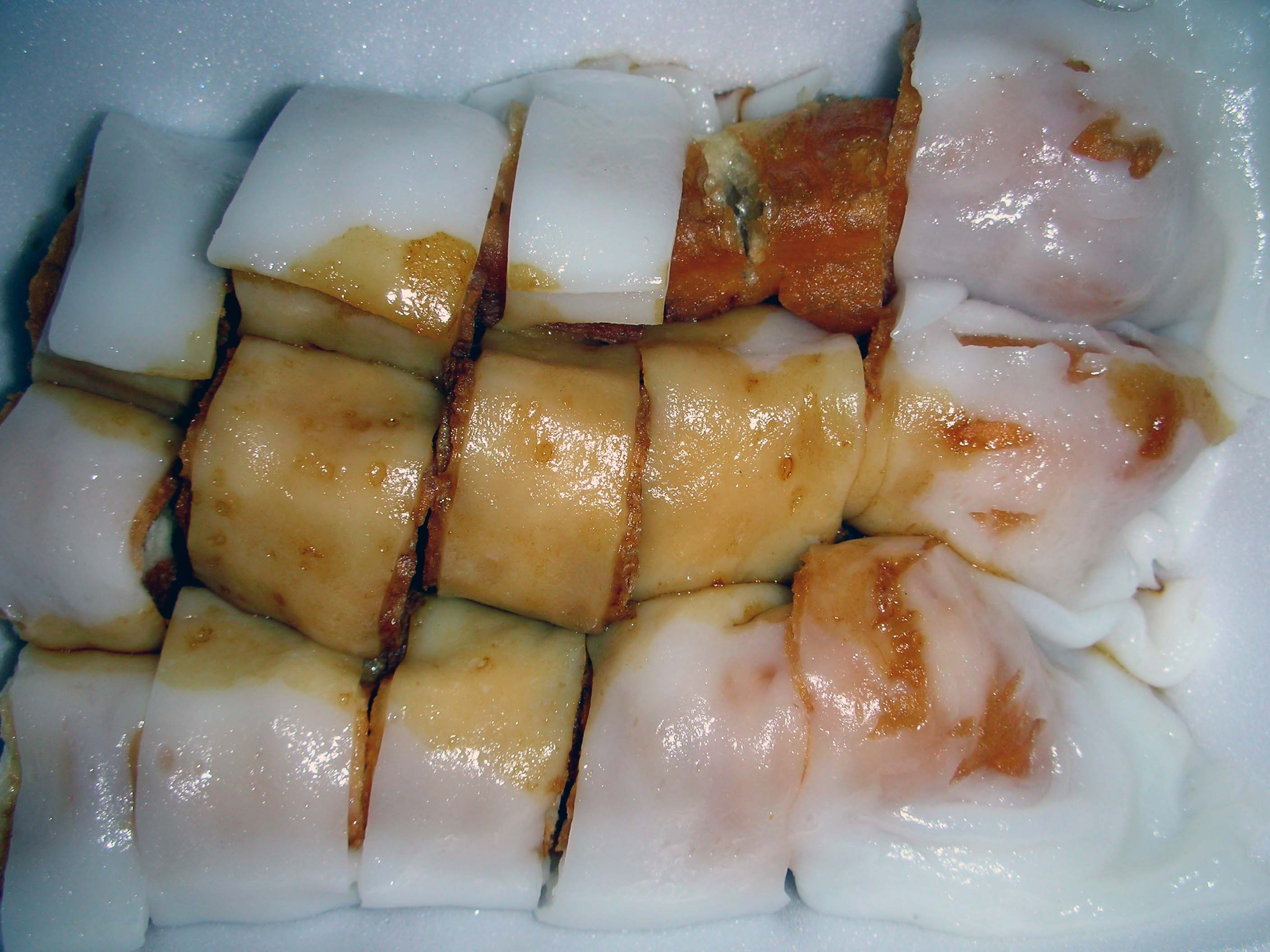

== See also ==
- List of fried dough varieties
- Ci fan tuan
