= La Venta de Churros =

First three episodes of the sixth season of El Chavo del Ocho

- El Chavo del Ocho episodes
- Episode nos.: Season 6 Episodes 1-3
- Directed by: Roberto Gómez Bolaños
- Written by: Roberto Gómez Bolaños
- Original air date: March 3, 1978 – March 20, 1978
- Running time: 30 minutes per episode

Episode chronology
← Previous "En esta vecindad están prohibidos los animales"	Next → "Enyesar la vecindad"

"La Venta de Churros" (Brazilian Portuguese: Os Churros de Dona Florinda, A Sociedade, A Sociedade dos Churros or O Vendedor de Churros; English: The Churros Sale) is a three-episode saga from the sixth season of the Mexican television sitcom series El Chavo del Ocho. The episodes make up the season premiere and aired between March 3 and 20, 1978, being both written and directed by Roberto Gómez Bolaños, it originally aired on Televisa's Canal 2. The saga stars Don Ramón, who ends up forming a partnership with his long-time enemy Doña Florinda to sell churros made by Florinda.

The saga was remade as the sixth episode of the first season of El Chavo Animado on November 9, 2006, adapting only the first two episodes into a single episode.

== Plot ==
=== Part 1 ===
Don Ramón returns to the village without finding any new job to earn money. Meanwhile, Doña Florinda, who is currently short of money, asks Quico to buy bread for the visit of Professor Jirafales by giving him only 3 coins, but Chilindrina and Chavo trick Quico with a trick to get hold of the coins to buy lollipops. The two return to the neighborhood and give one of their lollipops to Quico, but Doña Florinda appears and asks Quico where the bread is, but seeing Don Ramón nearby she claims that she won't need it anymore because she will make churros and Quico mentions that Jirafales had eaten 8 churros last time. Don Ramón becomes interested in this and knowing that Florinda is having financial problems, he decides to create an agreement with her so that she cooks the churros and he sells them.

Later, when he sees Quico taking flour to his house, Chavo decides to go along to help them prepare the churros, however, both he and Quico end up causing a mess when trying to make the churros. In the end, Chavo ends up breaking Doña Florinda's bowl and is kicked out of her house.

=== Part 2 ===
In the next day, while Don Ramón begins to build the stand to sell the churros, Doña Florinha returns to the vecindad with a new bowl to prepare the churros. Later, Chavo and Chilindrina begin to smell the churros being prepared and, wanting to eat them, decide to go and ask (claiming that it was at Don Ramón's request) if the churros are already baked, but Quico tells them through his mother that they are not. Then, after completing the stand, Don Ramón decides to go talk to Doña Florinda, but Florinda, annoyed by so many interruptions, throws the pan with the dough on Ramón's head, making him so angry that he starts stamping his feet on the floor. Professor Jirafales arrives at vecindad and thinks that Don Ramón is playing at being a marching soldier. When he tries to call out to Florinda, Quico (believing it was Ramón interrupting them again) accidentally throws the pan of flour at Jirafales. While Florinda tries to resolve the misunderstanding, Chavo takes the opportunity to enter the house and hides under the table. Florinda invites Jirafales to eat churros with hot chocolate, but Chavo steals every churro brought without Jirafales noticing until Chavo takes Jirafales' cigar and is discovered by him. Then Florinda appears with a tray with more hot chocolate, but Chavo accidentally drops it on Jirafales' legs and Quico solves the problem by "putting out the fire" with a jug of water.

=== Part 3 ===
While playing checkers with Quico, La Chilindrina is asked by Chavo and her father about their clothes that she had washed. Without realizing it, Chilindrina switches the two's clothes, which ends up causing Chavo to appear wearing Ramón's clothes and Ramón wearing Chavo's clothes (the latter even becoming the butt of Quico's joke). After solving the clothing problem, Ramón meets Florinda ready to sell the churros, but is forced to wear a humiliating uniform.

Ramón goes to the sidewalk near the vecindad to sell the churros and is followed by Chavo who is interested in the churros. Ñoño appears as the first customer wanting 15 churros, but after an argument with Chavo he ends up preferring to eat tortas instead of churros and Chavo takes Ñoño away making Ramón angry for having lost the chance to sell. Ramón tries to vent his anger by throwing his uniform hat on the floor and starts stomping on it, but when Doña Florinda sees him dirtying the hat she made herself, she punishes Ramón with a slap.

Later, Ramón feels the need to go to the bathroom and leaves the stand in Chavo's care paying him with a coin. While taking care of the stand, Chavo decides to play at selling churros to himself (pretending to be Don Ramón) using the coin, but this ends up leading him to eat all the churros. Ramón returns and when he sees the empty tray he initially believes that Chavo managed to sell all the churros, but the boy's silence ends up making him deduce that he ate everything and furiously decides to tell him to leave. Florinda appears and, seeing the empty tray, decides to ask Ramón for the money from the sales. However, Ramón, not wanting to snitch on Chavo, decides to take the blame, saying that he was the one who ate all the churros and prepares to be beaten by Florinda, however, Florinda reveals that Chavo had already told her the truth and praises Ramón's attitude in wanting to take the blame for what Chavo did.

== Cast ==
- Ramón Valdés as Don Ramón
- Florinda Meza as Doña Florinda
- Roberto Gómez Bolaños as El Chavo
- Carlos Villagrán as Quico
- María Antonieta de las Nieves as La Chilindrina
- Rubén Aguirre as Professor Jirafales
- Édgar Vivar as Ñoño

== Production ==
The saga began the sixth season, having been made in a period where sagas between 2 and 3 episodes were common in the series. Angelines Fernández was absent during these episodes.

== Reception ==
The saga is considered a cult classic among Chespirito fans. The saga helped popularize the sale of churros in Brazil, to the point that this food is easily seen being associated with Mexican cuisine in the country, so much so that many churro sellers have often used the image of the El Chavo del Ocho characters to boost sales and churros have become one of the main symbols for the series. In 2020, the website AdoroCinema listed the saga among the 15 best episodes of the series. In 2016, the saga was listed among the 7 best episodes of the series by the website Universo Retrô. The saga is also often cited as being among the episodes with the best moments focused on Don Ramón, with great focus on the scene in which he appears as a churro seller.

In the 2016 short film inspired by El Chavo del Ocho, titled Moleque, the character based on Don Ramón, named Soneca, is portrayed as a churro vendor.
