= Twisted doughnut =

Deep-fried pastry

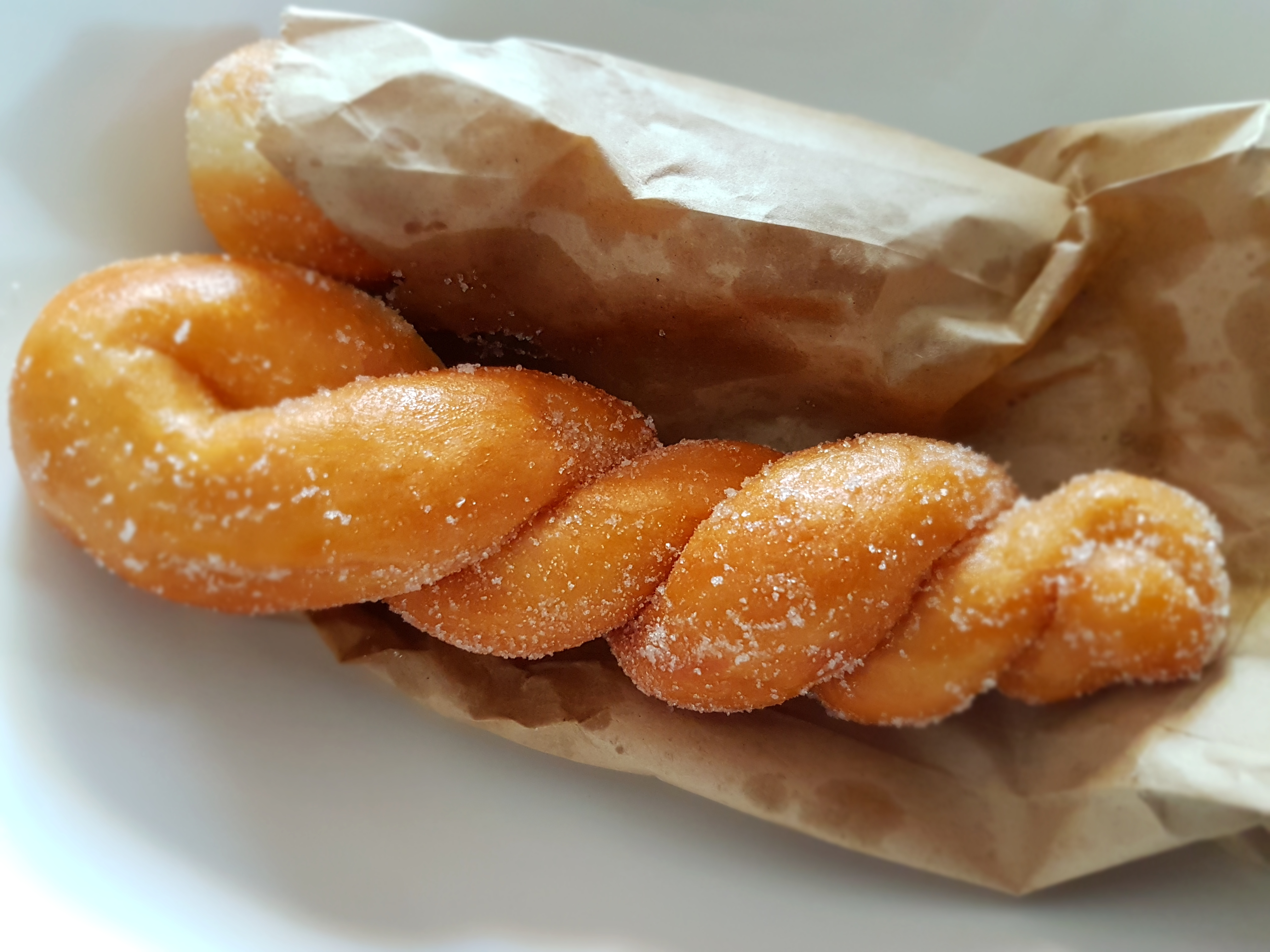
- Filipino shakoy
- Type: Doughnut
- Course: Snack

Twisted doughnuts are yeast donuts or sticks of pastry made from wheat flour or glutinous rice flour, deep-fried in oil. In China, they are known as mahua (麻花); in Korea, they are known as kkwabaegi (꽈배기), in the Philippines, they are known as shakoy or pilipit (depending on how it is made), and in Japan, they are known as sakubei (索餅).

== Around the world ==
=== China ===
Chinese twisted donut

Mahua
- Traditional Chinese: 麻花
- Simplified Chinese: 麻花
Transcriptions
Standard Mandarin
- Hanyu Pinyin: máhuā
- IPA: [mǎ.xwá]
Yue: Cantonese
- Jyutping: maa4 faa1
- IPA: [ma˩.fa˥]

In Mainland China and Taiwan, twisted doughnuts known as mahua (麻花) are traditional fried desserts with regional variations. The main ingredients consist of flour, sugar and cooking oil, though salt, honey, nuts and other spices can be added as well. Once twisted into a braided shape, the dough is then fried in peanut oil. The two predominant variants are crispy-outside-fluffy-inside or completely crunchy. The original form was invented in the city of Tianjin and dates back millennia.

=== Italy ===
In Italy it is known as treccia, sometimes filled with pastry cream and covered with sugar, chocolate and other products.

=== Jamaica ===
In Jamaica, twist donuts were introduced to the island in the 1800s, by Chinese indentured labourers who also brought fried dough. They are sold in local bakeries, supermarkets, schools and in boxes by street vendors. Traditionally, most Jamaican bakeries were operated by Chinese Jamaicans of Hakka or Cantonese ancestry, who developed local pastries and breads. They are eaten as a snack or on-the-go lunch, sometimes accompanied with cheese. Twist donuts are usually covered with sugar, sweet glaze (vanilla or honey), cinnamon sugar, chocolate and other local toppings like coconut flakes.

=== Japan ===
Sakubei (索餅/さくべい), derived from the Tang dynasty of China to the Nara period in Japan was transmitted to the Tang confectionery one of noodles that of food, which is also said to have become the father of udon and somen, than rope-like shape also called muginawa (牟義縄). It is said that it disappeared in the middle of the Edo period, but it still exists in various places such as Nara, changing into shinko sweets (shinko, shinko dumplings, shinko mochi) (* However, it is now called shinko mochi). Most of them are made using Joshinko instead of wheat flour).

=== Korea ===
- Korean twisted donut
- Hangul: 꽈배기
- RR: kkwabaegi
- MR: kkwabaegi
- IPA: [k͈wa.bɛ.ɡi]

Twisted doughnuts are known as kkwabaegi (꽈배기) in Korean. The mildly sweet, fluffy, spongy, twisted doughnuts are made with yeasted wheat or glutinous rice flour dough and melted butter. They are deep-fried in oil and coated with sugar and cinnamon powder. It is often an after-school snack.

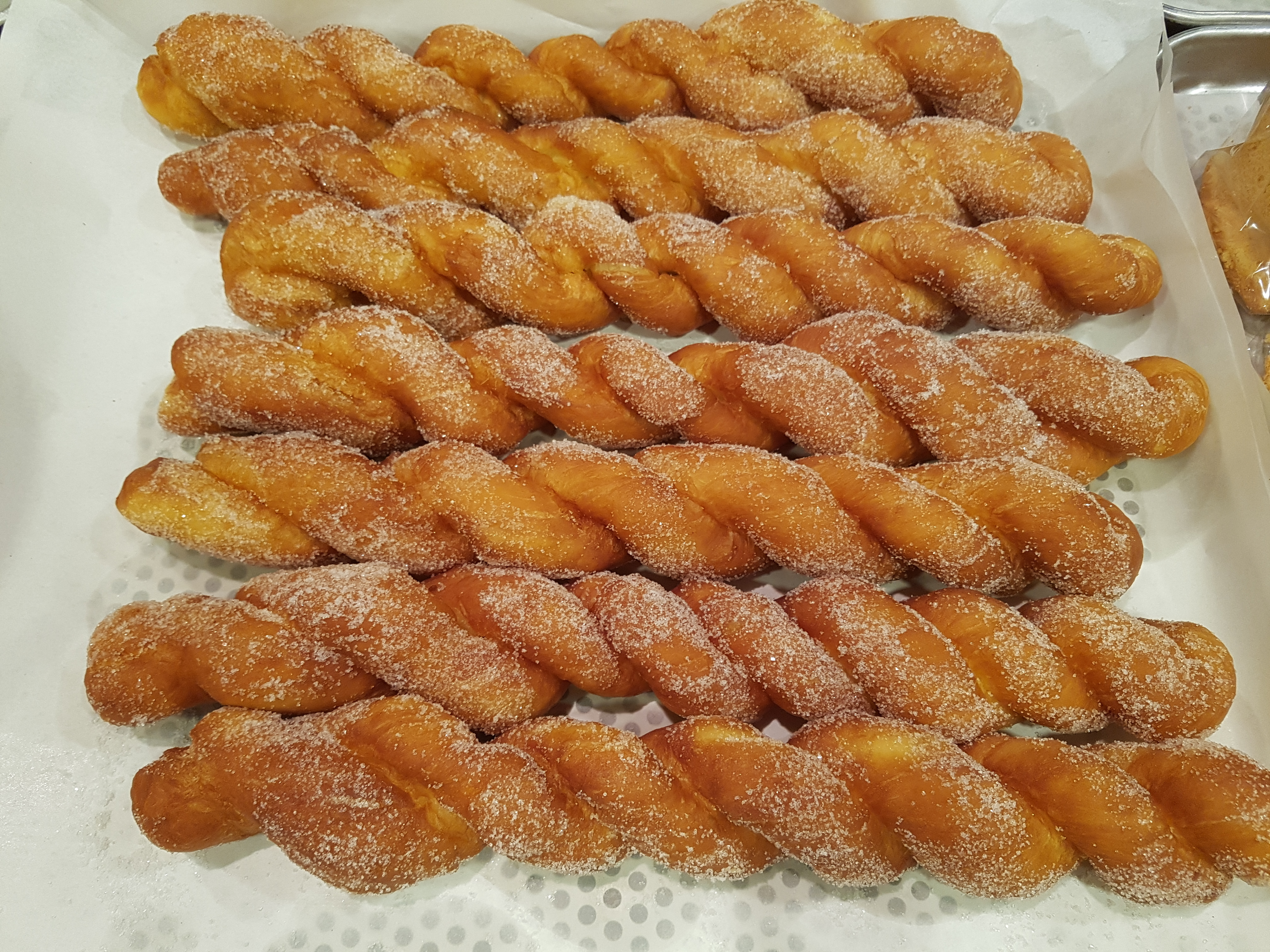
Glutinous rice dough kkwabaegi

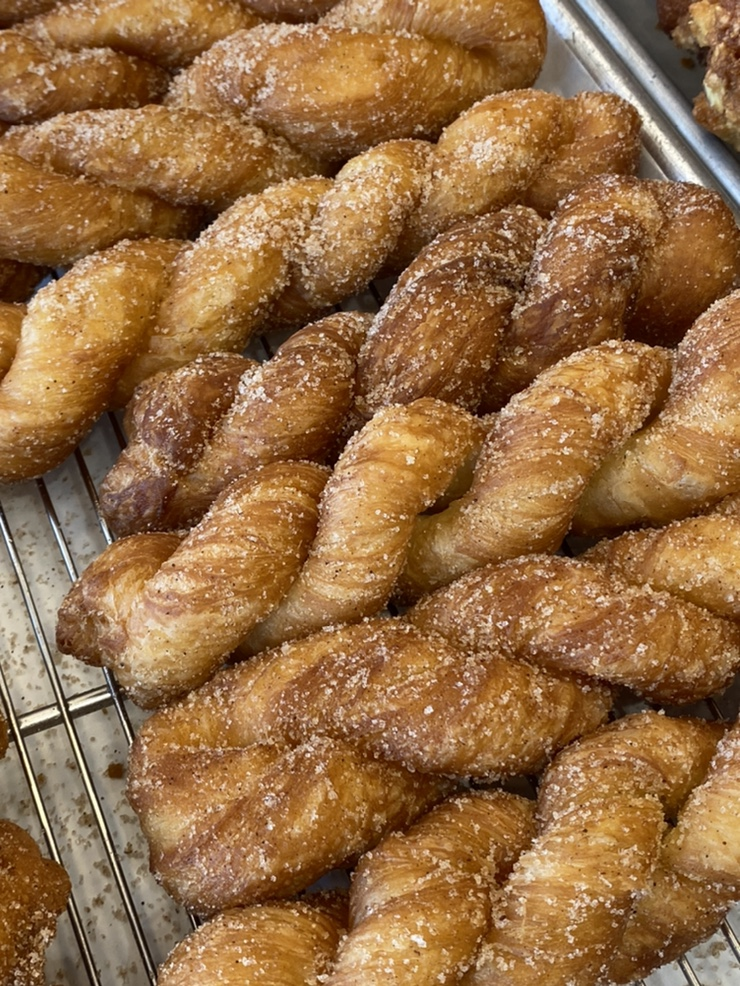
Pastry-dough kkwabaegi

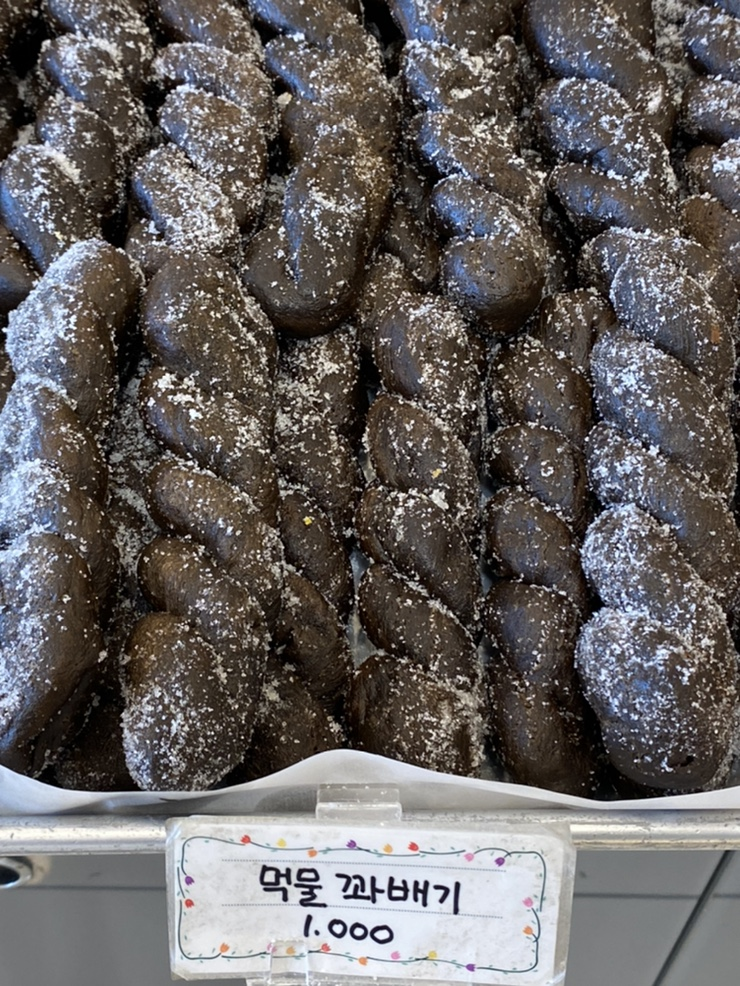
Squid ink kkwabaegi

=== Philippines ===
Shakoy or siyakoy from the Visayas Islands (also known as lubid-lubid in the northern Philippines) uses a length of dough twisted into a distinctive rope-like shape before being fried. The preparation is almost exactly the same as doughnuts, though there are variants made from glutinous rice flour. The texture can range from soft and fluffy to sticky and chewy. Hard and crunchy versions are known as pilipit. They are sprinkled with white sugar, but can also be topped with sesame seeds or caramelized sugar.

=== Vietnam ===
In Vietnam, it has a variety of names such as bánh quẩy thừng, bánh vặn thừng ('twisted-rope doughnut'), bánh vặn ('twisted doughnut'), bánh quai chèo ('oar rope doughnut'), bánh quẩy đường ('sweet twisted doughnut').

== See also ==
- Chapssal doughnut
- List of doughnut varieties
- List of fried dough foods
- Cruller
