= Pilipit =

Traditional Filipino doughnut

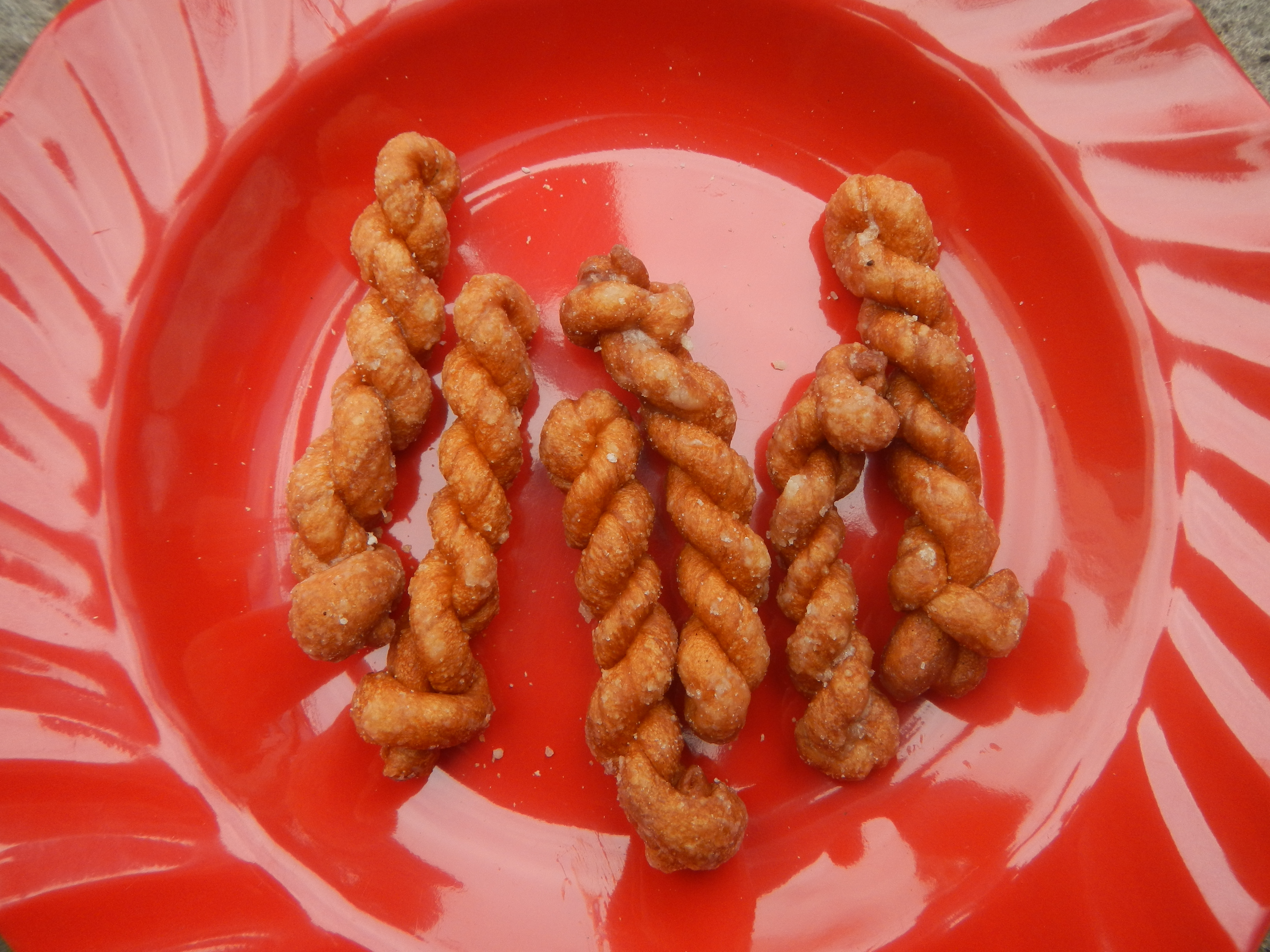
- Alternative names: Otso, Bitso-Bitso
- Type: Doughnut
- Place of origin: Philippines
- Variations: Shakoy, kalabasang pilipit

Pilipit is a traditional Filipino deep-fried twisted doughnut. It is made with flour, eggs, milk, salt, and baking powder. It is made mostly identically to the shakoy doughnut, except for its crunchy and hard texture and its smaller and thinner size. The word pilipit means "twisted" in Tagalog.

A very similar but distinct dessert, also known as pilipit, is a fried glutinous rice twisted doughnut from Maguindanao. It is much thicker and is made with a combination of white glutinous rice and purple rice, resulting in a distinctive lavender color. It is soaked and pounded into galapong and twisted into shapes before deep-frying. It is served sprinkled with fresh grated coconut.

== Variations ==
Another distinctive variation of this delicacy is the rice-based doughnut made with squash, also known as kalabasang pilipit or pilipit na kalabasa, which originates in the province of Quezon. This variety of pilipit is incorporated with grated or mashed squash, which gave it a yellow-orange tint and also a chewy and crunchy texture.

While it usually comes in a twisted shape, this variety also comes in shapes like a circular doughnut dipped in a caramelized sugar syrup or a coconut-based caramel sauce, also known as sangkaka or santan.

== See also ==
- Kumukunsi
- Lokot-lokot
- Cruller
- Binangkal
- Panyalam
