= Mahua (snack) =

Chinese dough twist fried in peanut oil

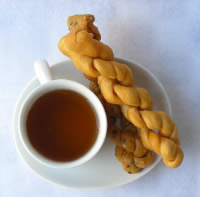
- Mahua with tea
- Type: Doughnut
- Place of origin: China
- Main ingredients: Dough, peanut oil

Mahua
- Traditional Chinese: 麻花
- Simplified Chinese: 麻花
Transcriptions
Standard Mandarin
- Hanyu Pinyin: máhuā
- IPA: [mǎ.xwá]
Yue: Cantonese
- Jyutping: maa4 faa1
- IPA: [ma˩.fa˥]

Mahua (Chinese: 麻花), also known as fried dough twists, is a Chinese food consisting of dough twists fried in peanut oil. Mahua is prepared in various ways and usually has a dense and crisp texture, with flavors ranging from sweet to spicy. The origin of mahua can be traced back to thousands of years ago. Mahua is traditionally eaten in many places and is considered a signature food of the northern Chinese city of Tianjin.

== Origin ==
According to legend, mahua originated two thousand years ago for a three-day festival during which people were not allowed to use fire. Without fire, people could not cook. So they prepared food that did not spoil easily beforehand. The original form of mahua was fried dough with honey, it was invented as a snack for the festival because it could be kept fresh for a long time.

Another legend of the origin of mahua states that it was created to curse wild scorpions. As a revenge for bothering them, people twisted wheat dough into the shape of a scorpion's tail, which they then fried. This food eventually became known as mahua.

== Variations ==
=== Guifaxiang mahua ===
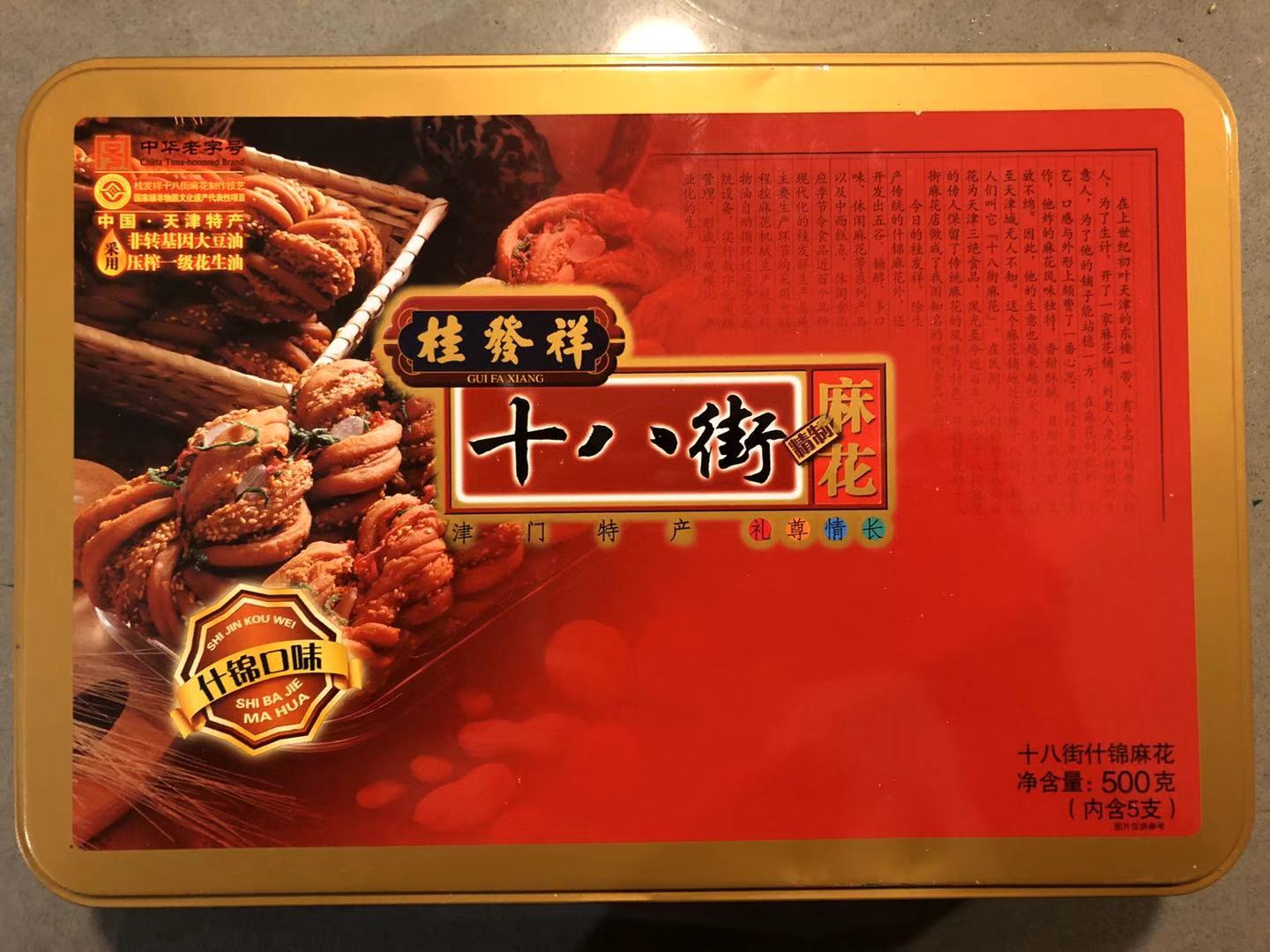
Guifaxuang mahua

The most famous variety of mahua is "Guifaxiang 18th Street Fried Dough Twists", which originated on a shop on the 18th Street in Tianjin. In Tianjin, people typically consume mahua with a sweet or salty flavor. The most common ingredients in Guifaxiang mahua are flour, sesame, walnut, peanuts and sweet-scented osmanthus.

The Guifaxiang mahua store was founded in 1927 by Laoba Liu on the western side of Tianjin's Haihe River. In Chinese, the name "Guifaxiang" is a compound of the words for sweet osmanthus (桂花, guì huā), prosperity or rising fortune (发, fà), and auspicious or peaceful (祥, xiàng)

According to the store’s website, the store’s original owner Laoba invented a way to put assorted fillings into the mahua to improve its appearance and taste. Gradually, the store’s mahua became one of the most famous snacks of Tianjin and became well-known across all of China.

The store later built a Museum of Mahua, where visitors can learn about the history of mahua and tour the factory line.

=== Chen-mahua ===
Chen-mahua is a type of mahua famous in Chongqing. It originated in Ciqikou and was later popularized in the Qing Dynasty. Chen-mahua is normally made in ten flavors: original taste, black sesame, pepper salt, black rice, corn, rock sugar glutinous rice, spicy, seaweed, chocolate, and honey. The spicy flavor mahua is the signature mahua of Chongqing.

=== Mafá mahua ===
Mahua is extremely popular in Panama, where it has been adopted as a national dish and is referred to as mafá. It was brought over by Chinese immigrants during the nineteenth century.

== See also ==
- Twisted doughnut
- List of doughnut varieties
- List of fried dough varieties
