= List of doughnut varieties =

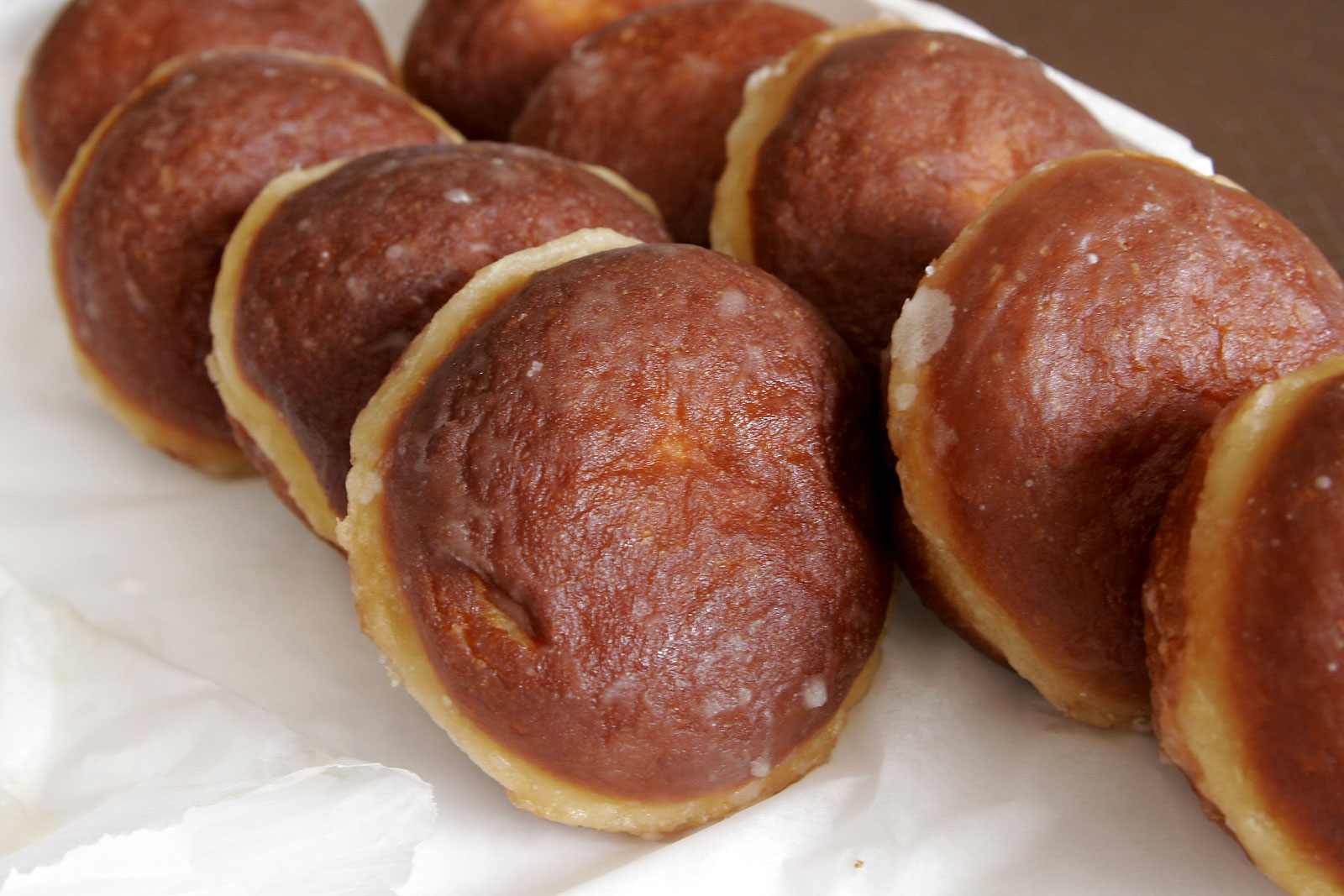
Traditional Polish pączki

Doughnuts are a type of fried or baked dough food. The following is a list of doughnut varieties.

== Variations and specialties by region ==
The terms below constitute either names for different doughnut types created using local recipes, or for the local language translation of the term for an imported doughnut product.

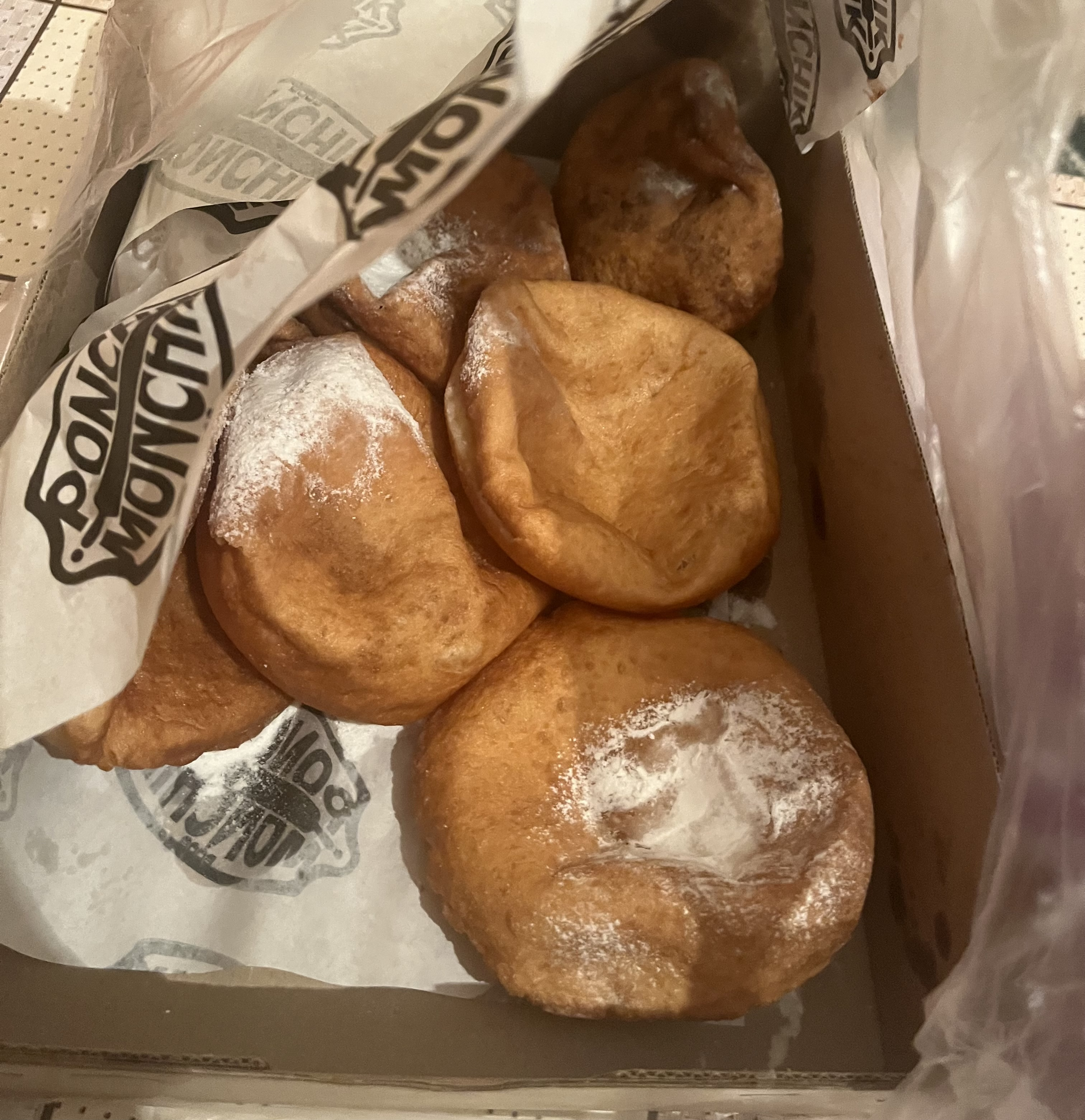
Armenian vanilla and chocolate custard filled fried dough sprinkled with powdered sugar called Ponchik

- Armenia – Ponchik (Armenian: պոնչիկ, borrowed from the Russian word пончик) is a deep-fried piece of dough shaped into a flattened sphere, that turns into a puffed-up sphere upon frying and then becomes a flattened sphere after it is opened. Ponchiks are filled with custard (plain, vanilla or chocolate mostly), while nowadays, they also get filled with Nutella, caramel and jam. In Armenian cuisine, ponchik has evolved from its possibly medieval Armenian (although under different name) and Soviet roots into a beloved street and café dessert with a distinctly local character. While the Russian ponchik is often unfilled, or filled with jam and resembles a normal donut, the Armenian version is always filled with custard and puffy, collapsing after It is opened. Tutalik (Armenian: տուտալիկ) is another Armenian doughnut-like dessert similar to doughnut holes, Armenian doughnuts are sometimes also referred to as chickies.
- Argentina – Berlinesas and Bolas de fraile ("friar's balls") are types of doughnuts sold in Argentina.
- Australia – Kitchener bun, Similar to Berliner, but with an open face and the use of more cream than jam. Besides traditional ring doughnuts, jam doughnuts are common in most bakeries, often sold warm.
- Austria – Austrian doughnut equivalents are called Krapfen and resemble the Berliner. Especially popular during carnival season (Fasching), they are solid and usually filled with apricot jam (traditional) or vanilla cream (vanillekrapfen). They are made from sweet yeast dough fried in fat or oil, usually with a filling of marmalade, jam, chocolate, champagne, custard, mocha, or with no filling at all. They are usually topped with icing, powdered sugar, or conventional sugar.

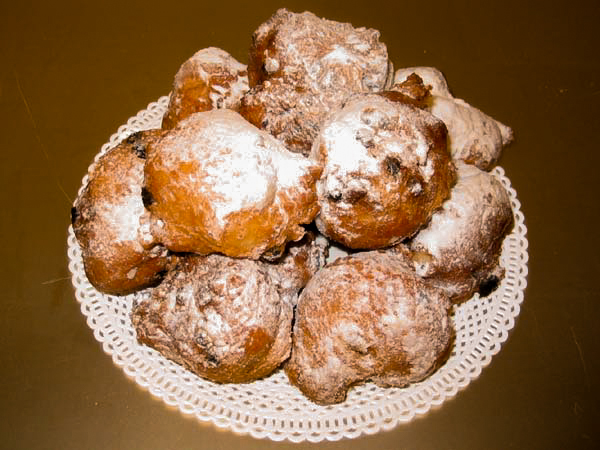
Oliebollen from Belgium and the Netherlands

- Belgium – Smoutebollen or croustillons are similar to Dutch Oliebollen but usually do not contain any fruit, except sometimes for apple chunks. They are typical carnival and fair snacks and are dusted with powdered sugar.
- Bohemia – "kobliha", "bavorský vdolek", see the Czech Republic
- Bolivia – Buñuelos are a round fry bread.
- Brazil – Goiabada, cream, milk candy or chocolate ganache filled doughnuts are referred to as sonho, meaning "dream". These are usually coated with a mixture of white sugar and cinnamon or topped with powdered sugar.

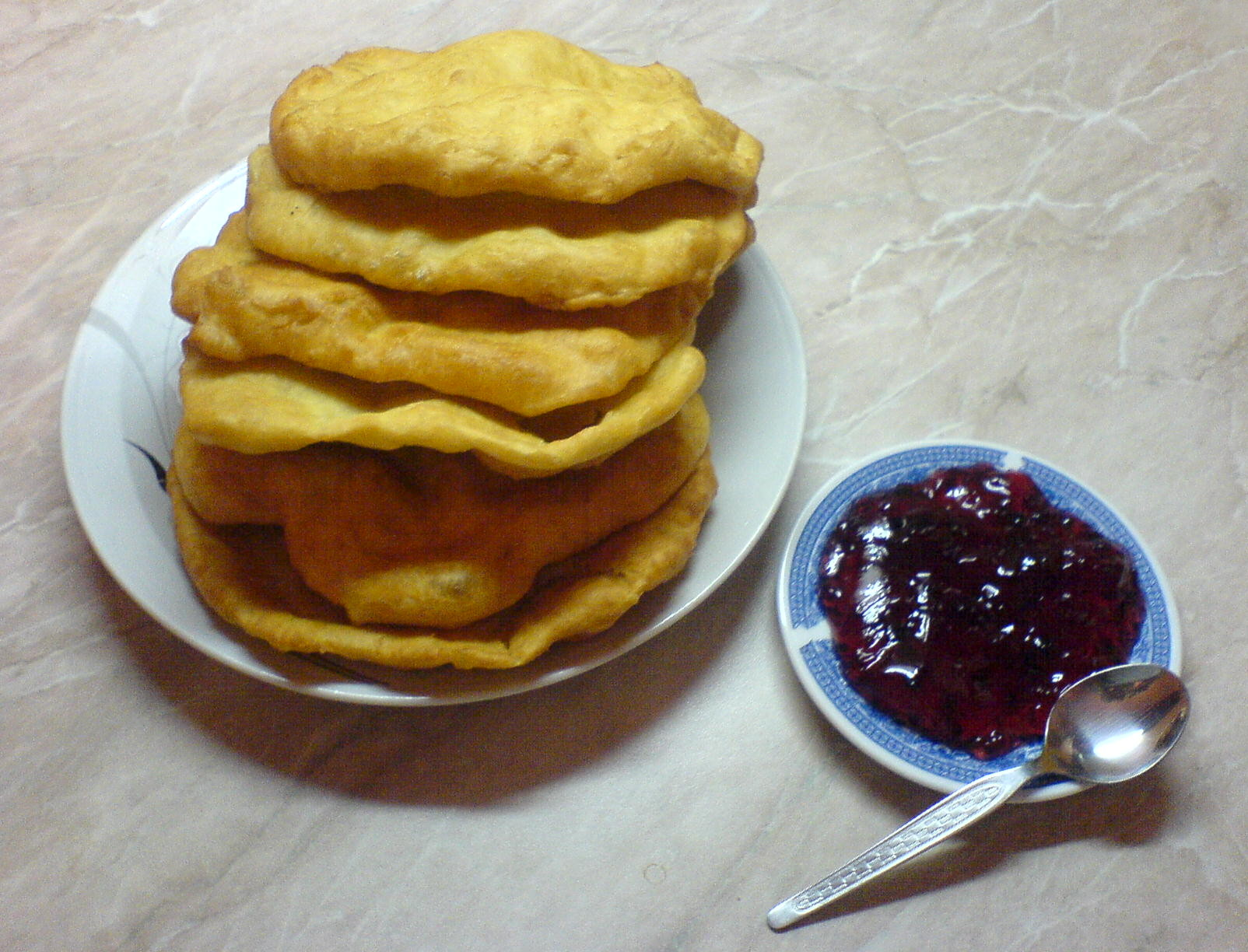
A stack of mekitsas with jam

- Brunei – kuih galang
- Bulgaria – ponichki, mekitsas
- Cambodia – nom kong, the Cambodian doughnut, which is named after its shape – the word កង, pronounced 'kong' in Khmer, means "wheel", while 'nom' (Khmer: នំបុ័ង) is the general word for pastry or any kind of starchy food. A very inexpensive treat for everyday Cambodians, this sweet pastry consists of a rice flour dough moulded into a classic ring shape and then deep fried in fat, then drizzled with a palm sugar toffee and sprinkled with sesame seeds. The rice flour gives it a chewy texture that Cambodians are fond of.
- Nigeria – Puff-puff
- Canada – Canadian variants include the beaver tail, cruller, dutchie, Timbits, potato flour doughnuts, and Newfoundland's toutin. Maple bars – bar doughnuts with maple syrup-flavored icing – are also commonly found in the US, especially in neighboring states, such as Ohio, Wisconsin and Michigan.
- Chile – Round fried filled doughnuts without holes are popular in Chile because of the large German community there. This doughnut is called a Berlin (plural Berlines). They may be filled with jam or with manjar, the Chilean version of dulce de leche.
- China – Although Chinese cuisine now features doughnut–type pastries borrowed from American and European kitchens, traditional pastries are somewhat different. They often feature thin, leathery dough surrounding plentiful mildly sweet or savory filling. Cantonese cuisine features an oval shaped pastry called Ngàuhleisōu (牛脷酥, lit. "ox–tongue pastry" due to its tongue-like shape). A similar food is called saa jung (沙翁), fried round dough balls with sugar sprinkled on top. A Shanghai dessert named 高力豆沙 is a variant of this, with oilier dough (originally made with egg white) and filled with red bean paste. Another variant uses thickened, lightly sweetened black sesame paste for filling and is sprinkled with sesame seeds. Other types are tikoy, zha gao, jin doi, chien doi, and zhá miàn quān. A salty variation are deep-fried doughnut sticks that are often quite oily, hence their Mandarin name, yóutiáo (油條, literally "oil strips"); in Cantonese, this doughnut–style pastry is called yàuhjagwái (油炸鬼); it is often served with congee, a traditional rice porridge. The most similar in appearance one is called Mianwo (面窝) popular in Wuhan. It is fried from rice and soybeans mixed slurry rather than dough and It also has a variant made from potato.
- Côte d'Ivoire – Gbofloto
- Colombia – buñuelos, roscas
- Corsica – fritelli

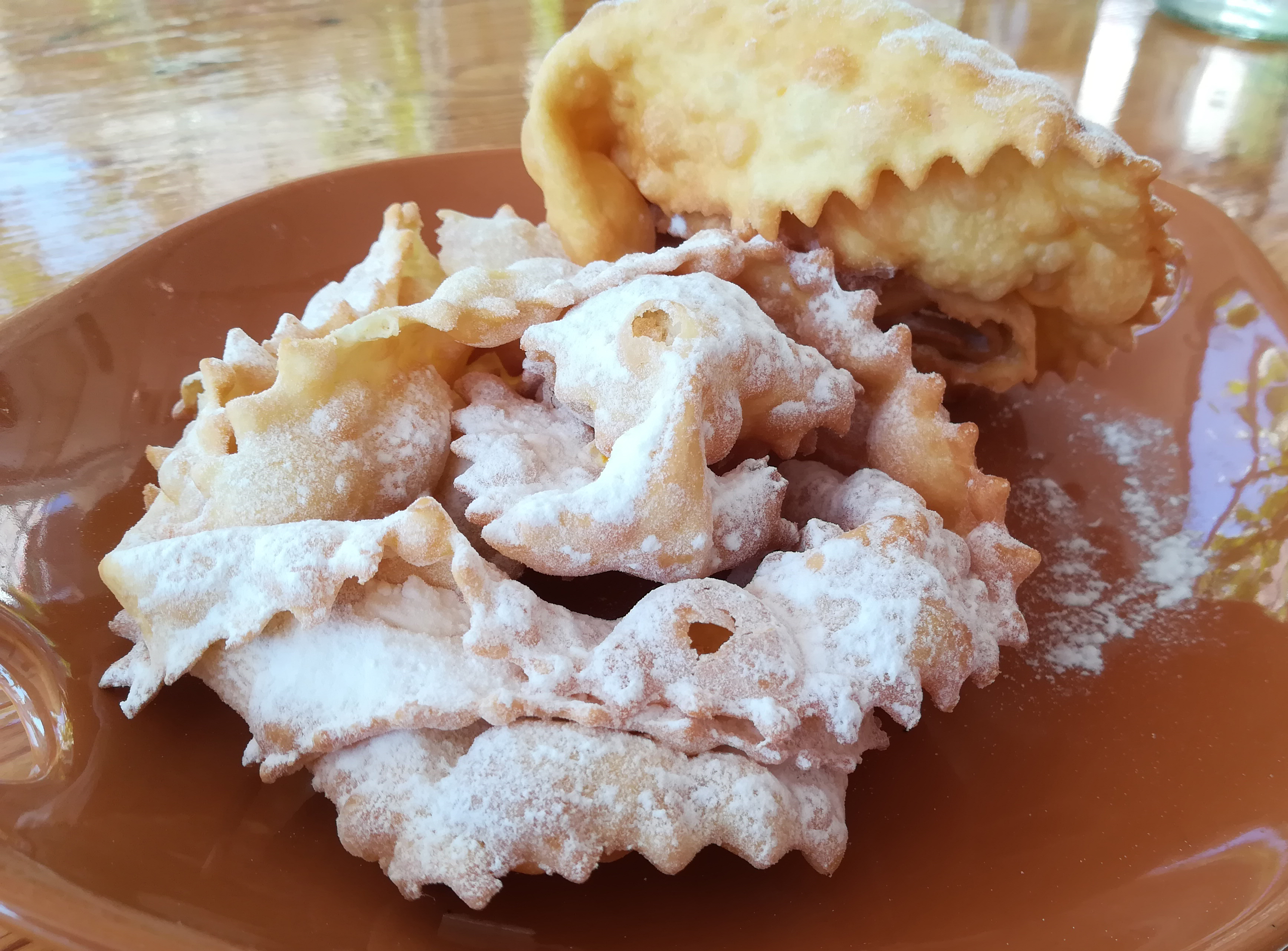
Kroštule

- Croatia – trijesce, primoštenske fritule, fritule, istarski cukarini, kroštule, krafne, krofna, krafna, or pokladnice (poklade meaning "carnival")
- Cyprus – Loukoumades
- Czech Republic – Koblihy or vdolky (without a hole) are usually filled with jam and dusted with sugar. Vdolky are not as high as koblihy. Bavorský vdolek or Bavorský koblih ("Bavarian doughnut") may be fried or baked and have jam and thick sour cream on top.
- Denmark – The "Berliner" without a hole is available in bakeries across the country and are called Berliner like in Germany. Another variant without the filling is aebleskiver, normally eaten with powdered sugar and jam on the side.
- Ecuador – Huevitos Chilenos ("Chilean Eggs"), a small variety of round Doughnut (without a hole), sold year-round on street corners around the country. The original Chilean Eggs are slightly different, and are called "Sopaipillas" in Chile and other South-American countries.
- Finland – Munkki (without a hole), Berliininmunkki/piispanmunkki (no hole, sugar coating), donitsi (with a hole), munkkirinkilä.
- France – Beignets are sometimes described as a French doughnut, and are popular in New Orleans, Louisiana. The Cronut (a portmanteau of croissant and doughnut) is a pastry resembling a doughnut and is made from croissant-like dough filled with flavored cream.
- Georgia – punchula

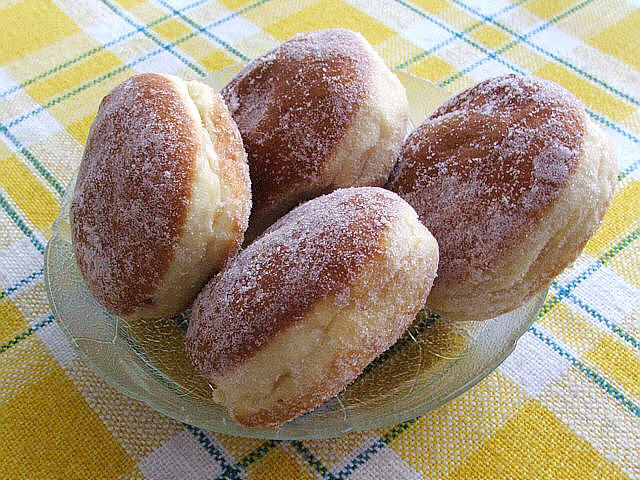
Traditional Berliner doughnuts

- Germany – The Berliner (Berliner Pfannkuchen) is a predominantly German and Central European doughnut made from sweet yeast dough fried in fat or oil, without a hole. The doughnuts are filled with jams, such as apricot, plum butter or rosehip jam. Other varieties and names are Obstkrapfen, Fastnachtskrapfen, Faschingskrapfen, Knieküchle, Auszogne and Kreppel.
- Ghana – Bofrot
- Greece – Svingi, Thiples, Loukoumades. A doughnut-like snack called Loukoumás comes in two types, a crispy one shaped like the number 8, and a larger, softer one shaped like the number 0.
- Haiti – Kokiyòl are Haitian Doughnuts made with ripe bananas, cinnamon, nutmeg, star anise, and vanilla. They were brought to the Island from the influences of West African, Spanish, and French Influences. Benyen De Kanaval (Beignet De Carnaval) are Haitian beignets made with bananas. A variation of the French creation.
- Hawaii – popular doughnut in Hawaii is the Malasada. They were brought to the Hawaiian Islands by Portuguese laborers from Madeira and the Azores who went to Hawaii to work in the plantations. They are small balls of yeast dough, deep fried, and coated in sugar.
- Hungary – Fánk, a round doughnut (without a hole) dusted with sugar, and Lángos, a flat fried bread made from yeast dough, served with sour cream and toppings like cheese, ham or chopped onions.
- Iceland – Kleinuhringir (doughnut), Kleinur, Berlínarbollur and Ástarpungar. Ástarpungar traditionally contain raisins.

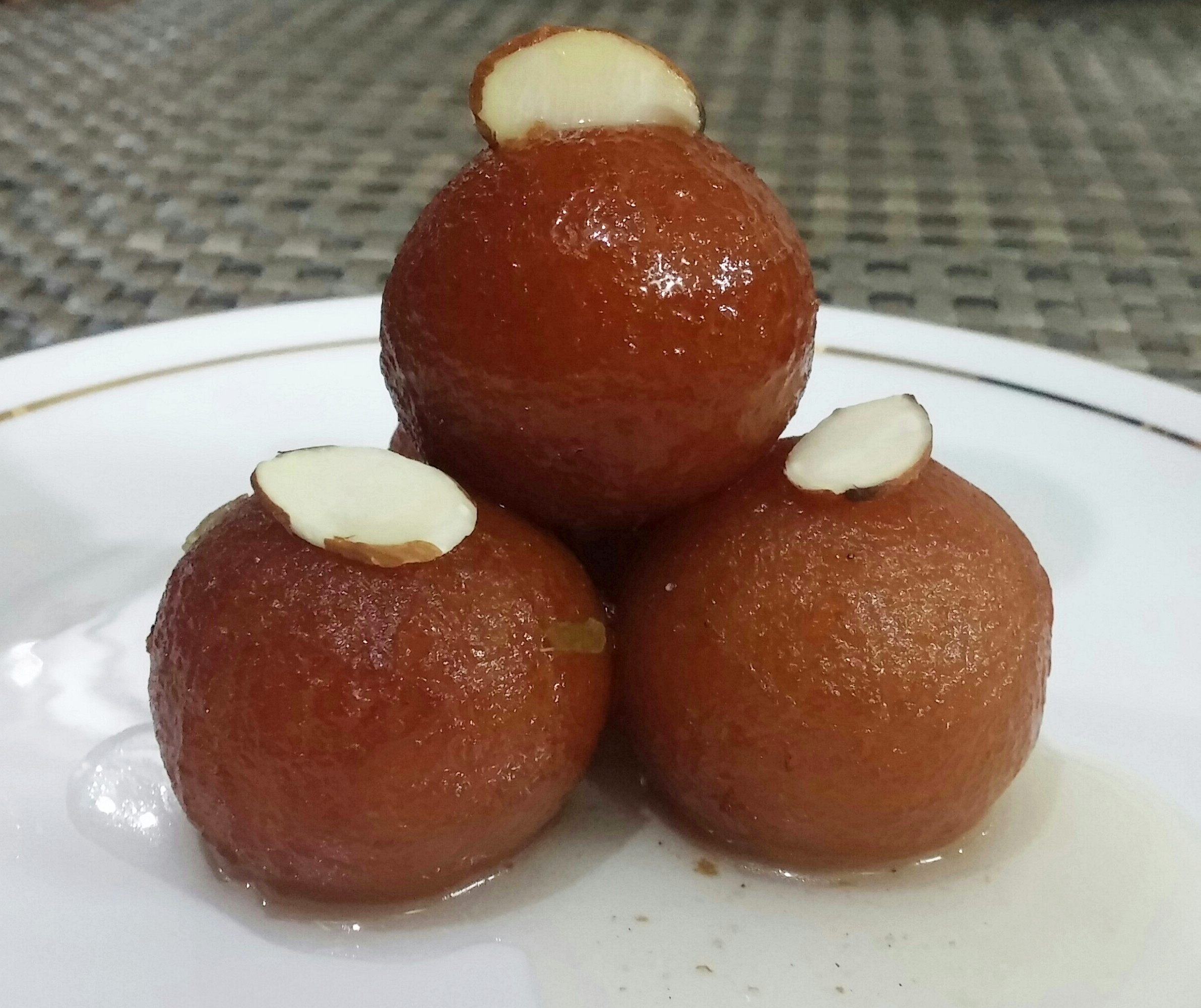
Gulab jamun topped with almond slivers is one of the most popular sweets from the Indian subcontinent.

- India – Gulgula are soft sweet deep fried round dough balls. Vadai are savoury rings of dough made from lentils that are popular in South Indian cuisine. They are not necessarily sweet. Varieties of sweet doughnut-like pastries include badushah or balushahi. They are made like an old-fashioned doughnut, by frying the dough in oil, and are soaked in sugar syrup and sometimes flavored with spices. Badushah does not have the center hole. Another sweet in India is imarti, known elsewhere as jalebi. Adhirasam are a Tamil sweet doughnut with a long history. Another similar dessert is gulab jamun – ball-shaped pastry from buffalo–milk–based quick dough that is fried and floated in rose water and cardamon flavored sweet syrup.
- Indonesia – Donat kentang (Potato Doughnut) is an Indonesian style fried mashed potato doughnut; it is a ring-shaped doughnut made from a combination of flour and mashed potatoes, coated in powdered sugar or icing sugar.
- Iran – Zooloobiya is a doughnut that comes in various shapes and sizes and coated in a sticky-sweet syrup. Razavi doughnut is ring-shaped with sugar on it. It is known as a symbol of Mashhad.

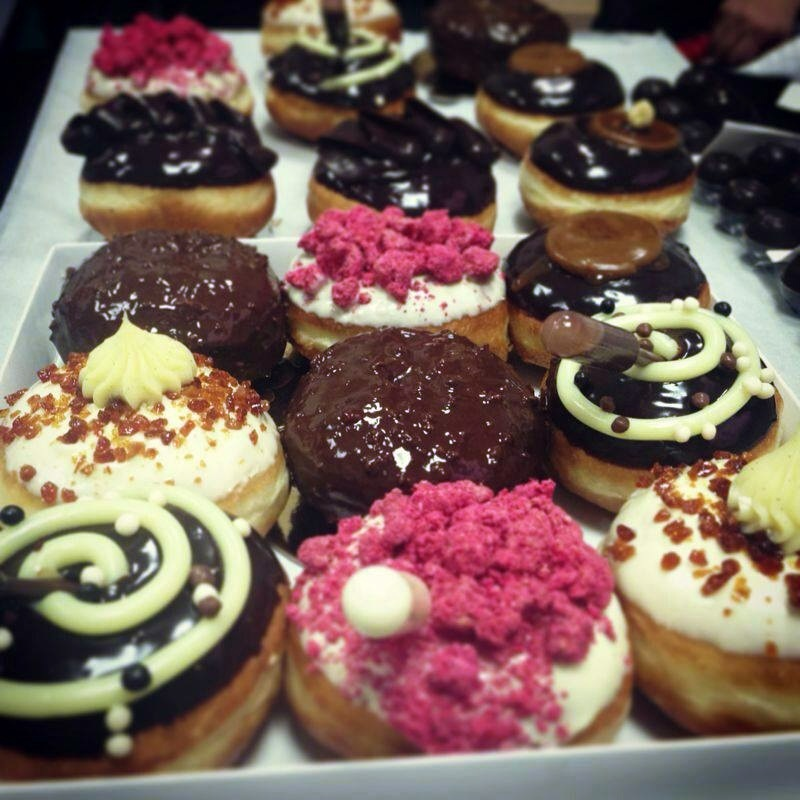
Sufganiyah

- Israel – Sufganiyah (סופגניה, plural Sufganiyot), like the German Berliner and the Polish pączki, are deep-fried, injected with jelly, and then topped with powdered sugar or frosting. They are a traditional Hanukkah food among Ashkenazi Jews.

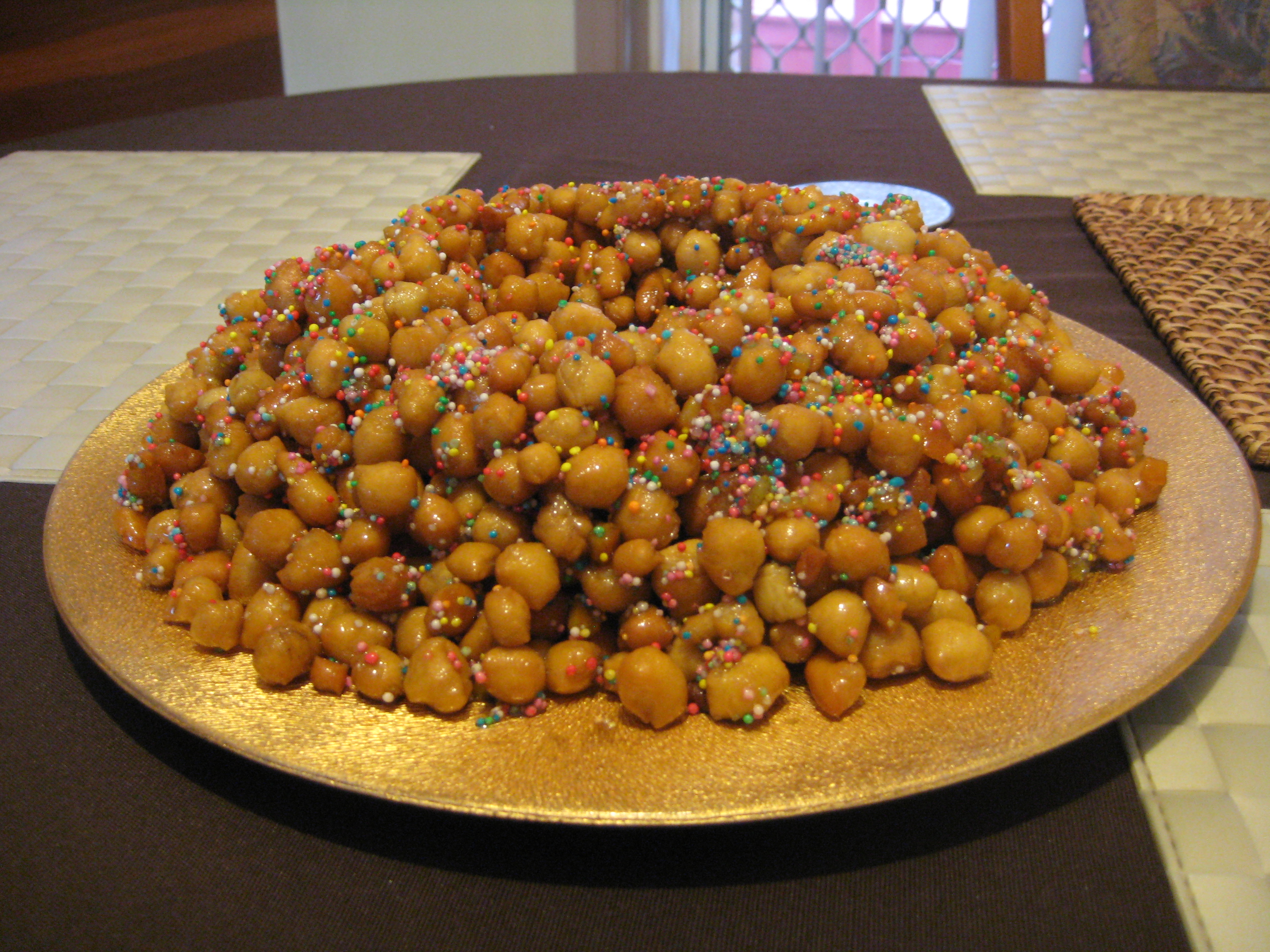
Struffoli

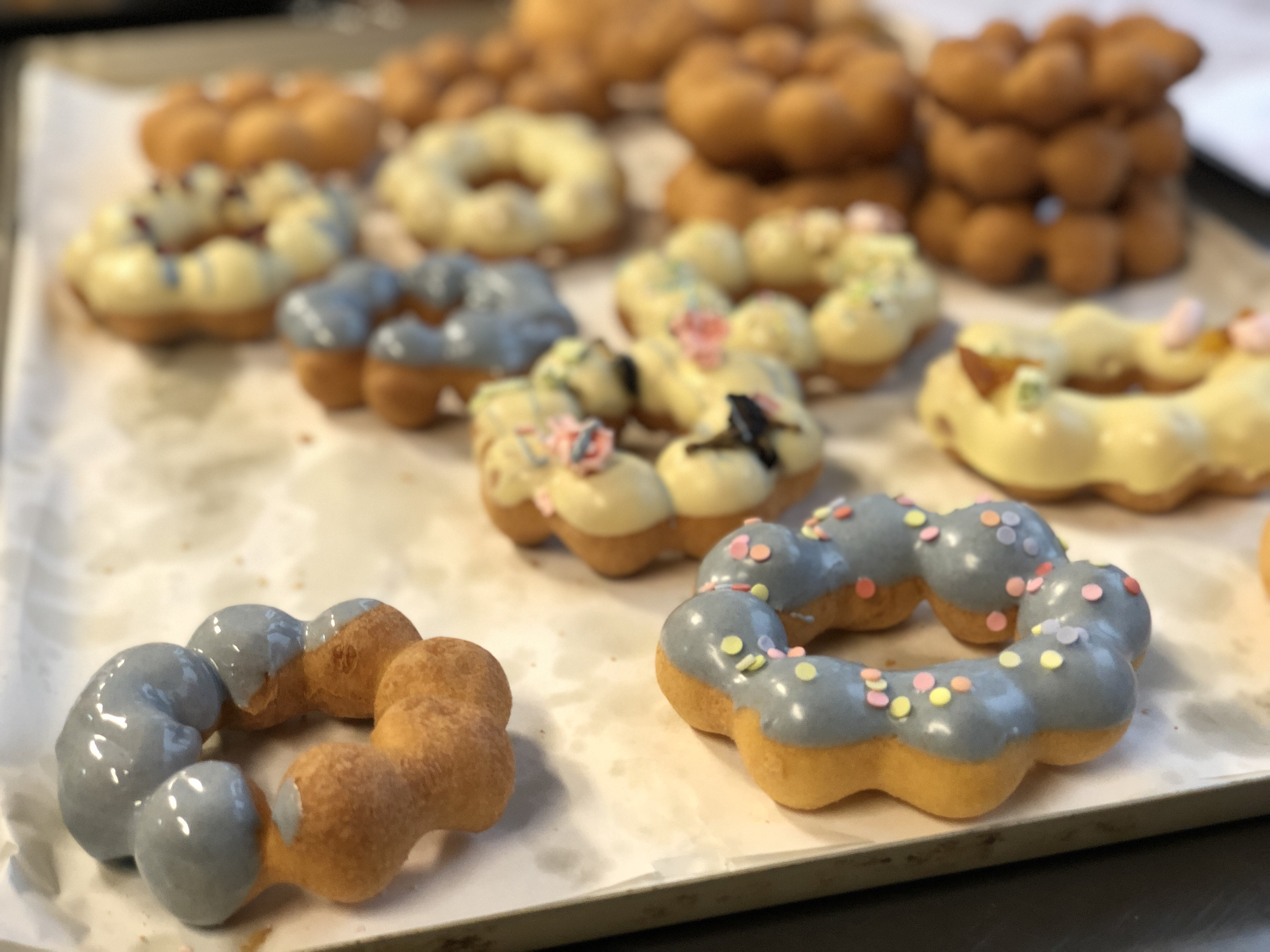
Glazed mochi donuts

- Italy – Struffoli, Pignolata, Guanti, (Assisi) Bastoncello, (Calabria) Scaddateddi, Zeppole, Chiacchiere, Lattughe (this may not be classifiable as doughnut, but it is fried pastry, in a Lettuce style) Cenci, Donzelle, Frappe, Sfrappole, Bugie, Crostoli, Frittelle, Graffe (Naples), Grispelli (potato dough speciality from the Catanzaro region), Ciambelli (Cocullo, Abruzzi), Bomboloni (Bombolonas), and (Palermo, Sicily) Sfingi.
- Japan – Sata–andagi. An-doughnut (あんドーナッツ, lit. "bean jam doughnut") is widely available and is similar to Germany's Berliner, except it contains red bean paste. Deep fried dough filled with Japanese–style curry called カレーパン (curry bread) is also very popular.
- Jersey – (Channel Islands) Jersey Wonders (Mèrvelles).
- Kazakhstan – Baursaki
- Kenya – Mandazi, Mahamri, Mandalas – sweet, triangular shaped breakfast delicacy eaten with a coconut side dish (baazi), made out of flour and sugar, originally from Mombasa
- Korea – Chapssal doughnut, twisted doughnut. Many bakeries in South Korea offer doughnuts either filled with or made entirely from the Korean traditional rice dessert tteok. These come in a variety of colors, though they are normally in green, pink, or white. They are often filled with a sweet red bean paste or sesame seeds.
- Lebanon – Awami
- Libya – Sfinz
- Lithuania – Spurgos are doughnuts with jam filling and sugar coating. There is also a local variety of doughnuts made from cottage cheese dough ("Varškės spurgos") which contains no filling.
- Madagascar – Mofo Boule
- Malaysia – Kuih Keria, Kuih Gelang, Kuih Tayar
- Mexico – Buñuelo, Churro, Sopapilla. The Mexican Donas are very similar to doughnuts including in the name; the dona is a fried–dough pastry–based snack, commonly coated with cinnamon sugar or granulated sugar, or dipped in chocolate. A pelona, alike Berliner, is a pastry similar to local doughnut with no central hole made from sweet yeast dough (Danish dough) deep fried usually in oil, filled with vanilla dulce de leche (in this case local manjar) and few raisins, conventional sugar as topping. Starting on a local doughnut's dough, rolled, shape molded, deep fried, sliced, opened two halves, filled, recap and topped. Is a popular snack in the street food vending but rarely seen in bakeries or any other food menus because it is dense and loaded with carbohydrates.
- Mochi donuts – a fusion pastry crossing traditional American doughnuts and Japanese mochi
- Moldova – Schlitzküchla (from German cuisine)
- Morocco – Sfenj
- Nepal – Sel roti
- Netherlands – Oliebollen are a traditional Dutch food eaten on New Year's Eve and at fairs. They are like a round doughnut without a hole (similar to trademarked plain "donut holes" in the US). Oliebollen are a traditional treat.
- New Zealand – Cream–filled doughnut

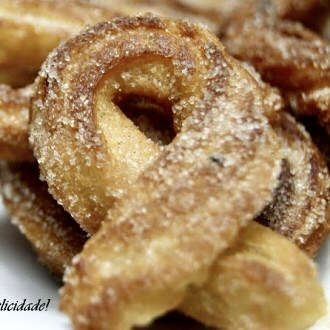
Portuguese Fartura

- Nigeria – Puff-puff, Chin chin

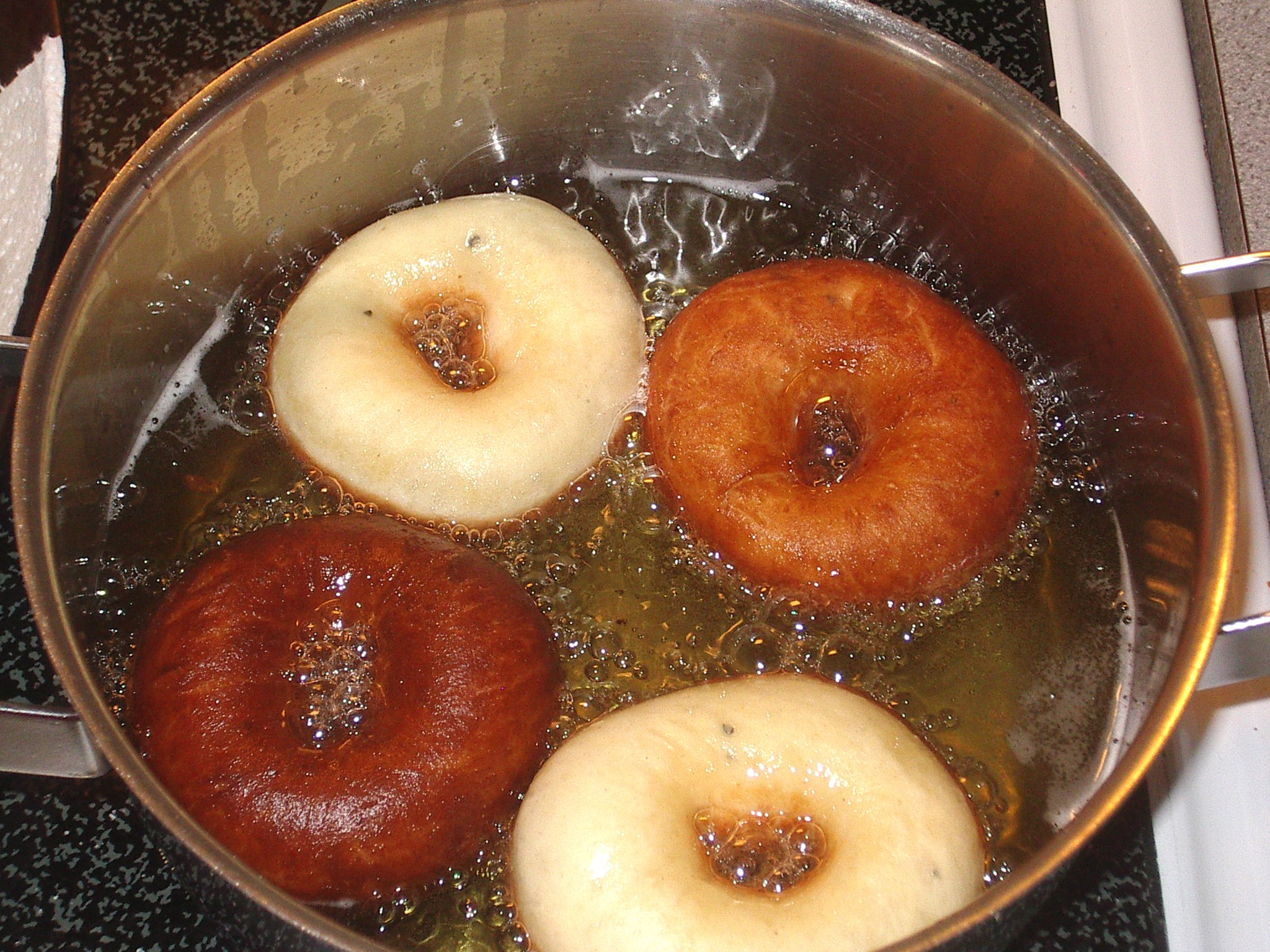
Smultringer being deep-fried

- Norway – Smultring, Fattigmann
- Paraguay – Bollos
- Peru – Dona, Picarones

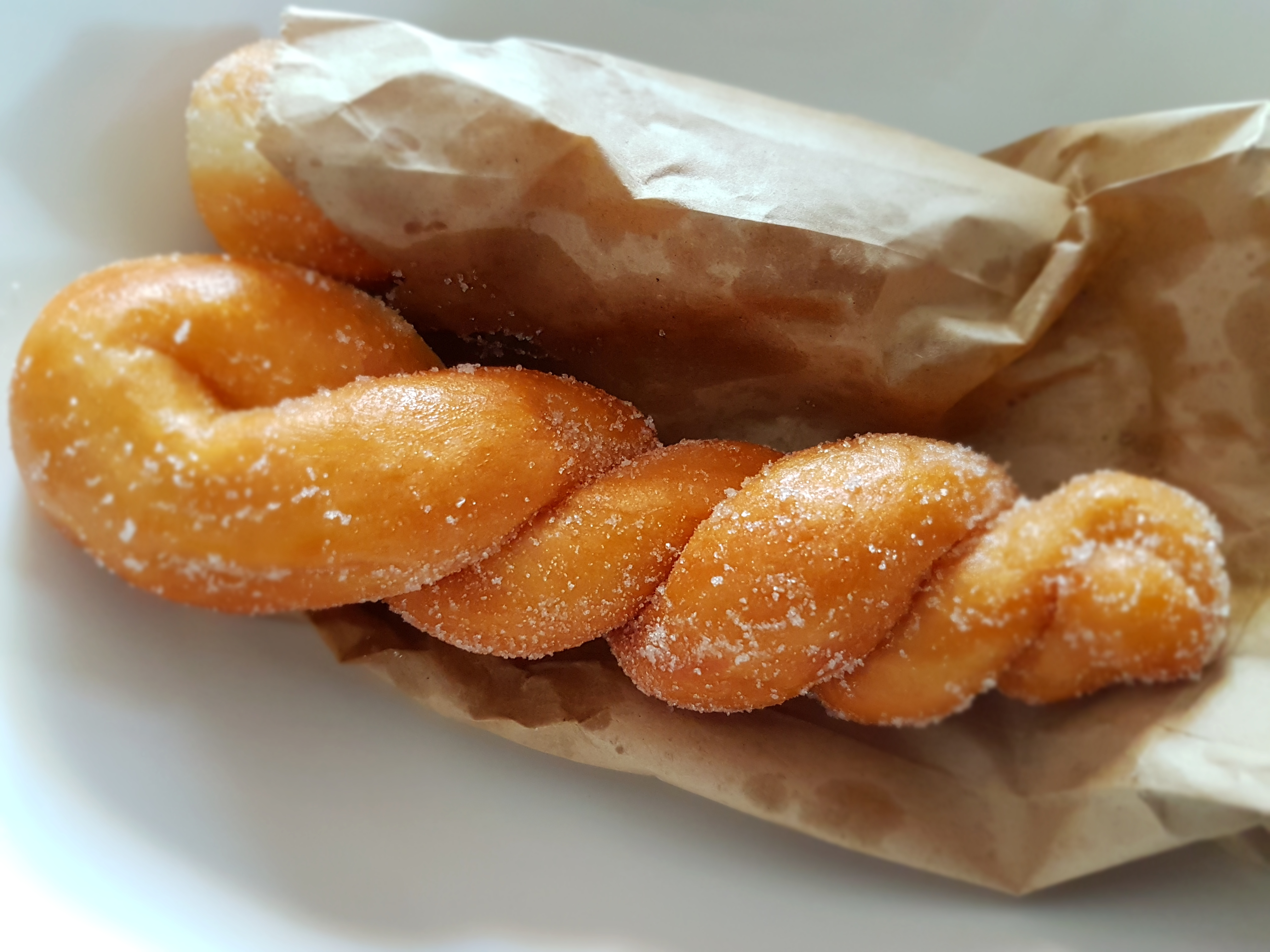
Shakoy from the Philippines

- Philippines – Binangkal, Buñuelos, Cascaron, Churro, Gorgoria, Kumukunsi, Lokot-lokot, Maruya, Panyalam, Pilipit, Pinakufu, Shakoy (Lubid-lubid)
- Poland – Pączki are round jam-filled doughnuts, known in Poland at least since the Middle Ages. Jędrzej Kitowicz wrote that during the reign of the August III under influence of French cooks who came to Poland at that time, pączki dough baked in Poland has been improved, so that pączki became lighter, spongier, and more resilient.
- Portugal – malassadas, fartura, filhós Portuguese-style doughnuts, dipped in sugar and cinnamon.
- Puerto Rico – quesitos (filled with sweet cheese)
- Romania – gogoşi

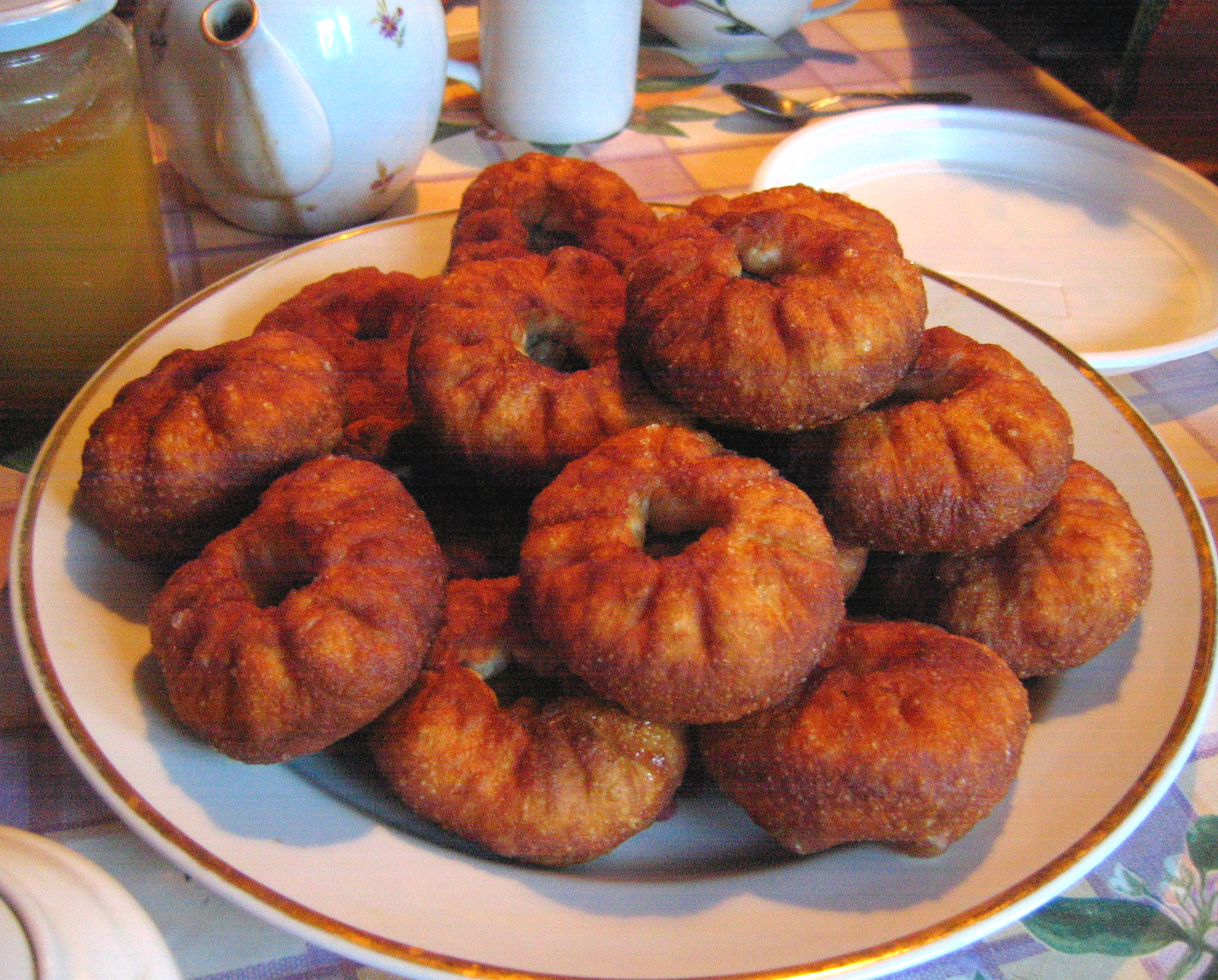
Belyashi

- Russia – Ponchik, Russian "ponchiki" (Russian: пончики), and "pyshki" (Russian: пышки), are deep-fried and sphere-shaped pieces of dough which could have a sweet (e.g. jam or powidl) or savory filling (e.g. ground meat or quark), or left plain. More traditional are deep-fried versions of pirozhki, as well as Tatar pərəməçlər, known as belyashi in Russia.
- Sardinia – zippulas
- Scotland – "Doughrings" is an alternative term for ring doughnuts. Square fudge doughnuts are also a tradition.
- Serbia – Doughnuts similar to the Berliner are also prepared in the Northern Balkans, particularly in Croatia (uštipci, Krofnepokladnice or Krafne) and Serbia's Vojvodina province. They are called Krofna, a name derived from the Austrian Krapfen.
- Sicily – pignolatti, sfingi, cuddureddi
- Slovakia – šišky (pronounced "shishky"), čeregy
- Slovenia – krofi, fanke, flancati

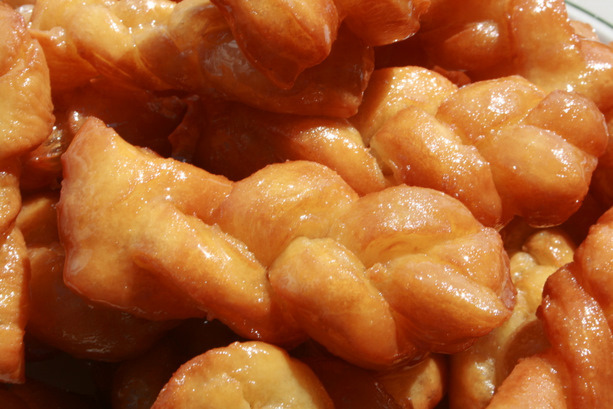
Koeksisters

- Somalia – Kac kac
- South Africa – Koeksister, An Afrikaner desert of plaited dough, fried and steeped in cold syrup. Oliebolle met Suurmelk ("sour milk doughnuts"). Another variation is the Vetkoek, dough deep fried in oil, served with mince, syrup, honey or jam. Koe'sister A spiced doughnut rolled in coconut.
- Spain – Churros, Porras, Chimeneas, Orange Roscos, Wine Roscos, Roscos de anis, Rosquillas de Ledesma, bimuelos, birmuelos, bermuelos, burmuelos, bunyols, chuchos, Rosquillas listas de san Isidro, rosquito tonto, rosquilla tonta. Buñuelos, bunyols in Catalonia and the Balearic Islands, bolo de vento in Galicia or kruxpeta in the Basque Country, are a traditional Easter pastry in the form of small balls without a hole. They can be sweet or savoury, but usually filled with custard or chocolate. The American or German–style donut is sometimes called a berlina.
- Sweden – munk (doughnut), klenät, flottyrring. One example is vaniljmunk which looks similar to the German Berliner but is filled with a vanilla custard.
- Switzerland – Ringli, Basler Krapfen, Chüechli, Öhrli
- Syria – qatayef traditional syrian sweets usually popularized during the month of ramadan. A variation of qatayef called satatee is made by filling this pancake-like dough with either cheese, qishta, or a filling made with wallnuts, cinnamon, and usually raisins. The dumplings are then deep fried and dipped in qatir syrup and served hot.
- Taiwan – tian tian chuan, (lit. "sweet sweet ring").
- Thailand – Khanom wong, Khanom khai hong
- Tajikistan – chalpak.
- Tunisia – Ftair, Yous–yous, Bambalouni
- Turkey – Hanim Göbeği, Tulumba tatlisi, İzmir lokması, dibile

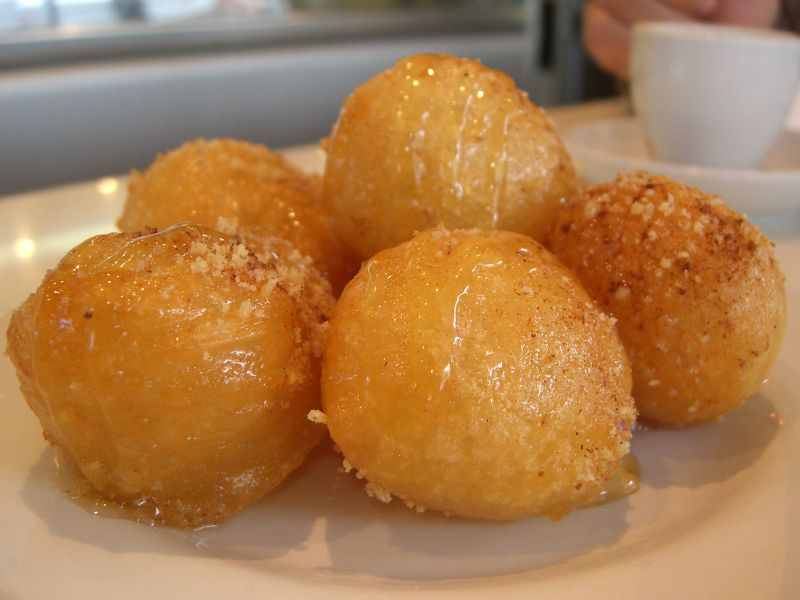
Lokma

- Turkmenistan – Pişme
- Ukraine – pampushky (sweet filling or garlic flavored) are traditionally baked, but may also be fried. Savoury pampushky have no filling and are usually seasoned with garlic butter and often served as a side dish with red borscht or yushka, especially at Christmas time. Sweet pampushky may be filled with fruits, berries, homemade jam, or poppy seeds, and topped with powdered sugar.
- United Kingdom – In the UK, granulated sugar is commonly used as a topping for doughnuts, although they are also sold with an icing, glaze or powdered sugar topping as well. Jam doughnuts are especially popular, with a derivative variety using vanilla custard as the filling also commonplace. In some parts of Scotland, ring doughnuts are referred to as doughrings, with the term doughnut being reserved exclusively for the nut–shaped variety. Glazed, twisted rope–shaped doughnuts are known as yum–yums. It is also possible to buy fudge doughnuts in certain regions of Scotland. In some parts of Northern Ireland, ring doughnuts are referred to as gravy rings due to their being cooked in oil, itself colloquially known as "gravy".

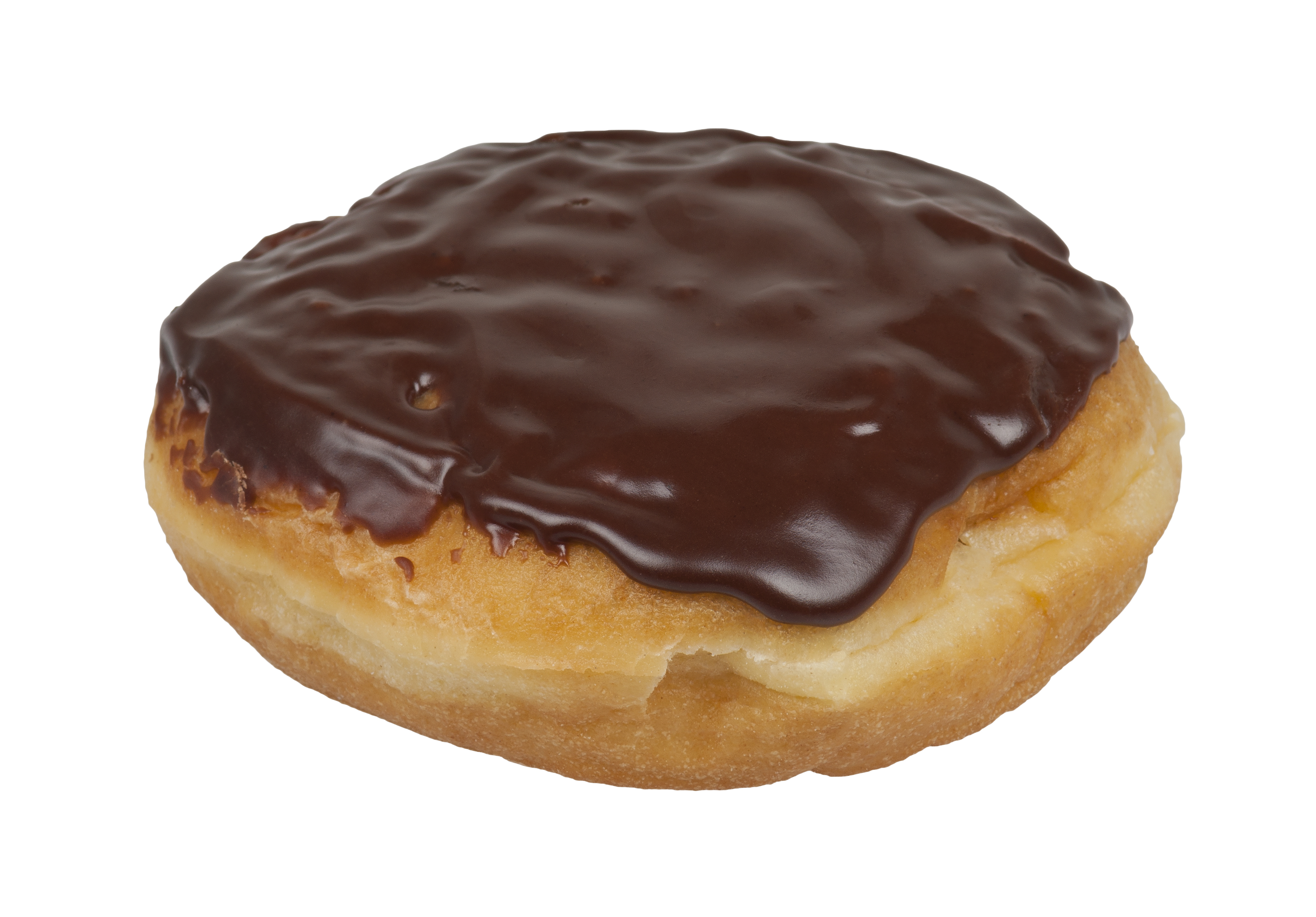
A Boston cream doughnut

- United States – In the US, doughnuts exist in cake, raised and piped varieties, and in many different shapes, including crullers (twisted piped bars), vanities, old-fashioned doughnuts, irregularly shaped "dropped" doughnuts, Boston cream doughnuts, potato doughnuts, sour cream doughnuts, cider doughnuts, simball, olicook (olykoecks), bear claws (although many varieties are filled pastries rather than doughnuts), elephant ears, yum yums, fasnachts, frying saucers, funnel cakes, bear signs (cowboy slang for ring doughnuts), Brown Bobby (a significant contingent in the 'doughnut shape debate' because this variety is (uniquely?) a 'triangular toroid'). Some varieties of johnnycake resemble doughnuts. Long Johns, particularly maple bars with maple-flavored icing, sometimes incorporate bacon. Twisted doughnuts are strands of dough that are braided and fried. The Pershing or Persian is also considered a doughnut in some parts of the United States. Local varieties similar to the doughnut include traditional Native American frybread (popular in the Plains/Mountain states) and beignets in New Orleans cuisine.
- Venezuela − Bomba
- Vietnam – Bánh tiêu, giò cháo quẩy
- Yemen – Zalabiyeh
- Zambia − Vitumbuwa

== See also ==
- List of doughnut shops
- List of deep fried foods
- List of fried dough foods
- List of desserts
