= Struffoli =

Deep-fried dough sweetened with honey

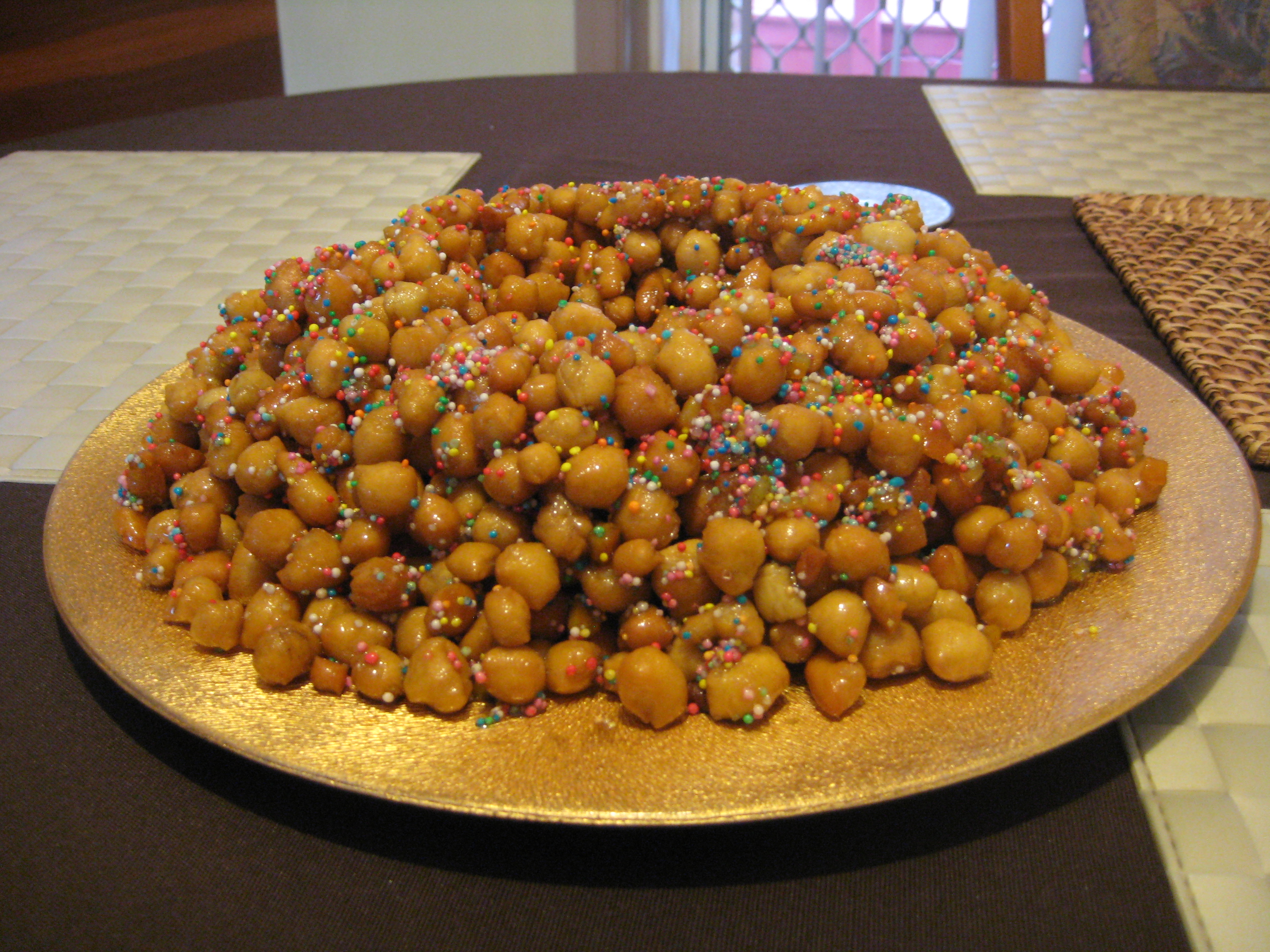
- Course: Dessert
- Place of origin: Italy
- Region or state: Naples, Campania
- Main ingredients: Dough, honey

Struffoli (Italian: [ˈstruffoli]; Neapolitan: struffule, Neapolitan: [ˈstrufːulə]), also known as Honey Balls, is a Neapolitan dish made of deep fried balls of sweet dough. The dough is used in many Italian sweet treats such as chiacchiere. For struffoli, the dough is formed in to balls about the size of marbles. Crunchy on the outside and light inside, struffoli are mixed with honey and other sweet ingredients and formed into mounds or rings. There are many different ways to flavour them, but the traditional way is to mix them in honey with diavulilli (nonpareils sprinkles), cinnamon, and bits of orange rind. Naming varies by region: in Calabria they are also known as scalilli, and in Abruzzo cicerchiata. They are often served at Christmas and are sometimes served warm.

== History ==
A similar dish is described by Archestratus, an ancient Greek poet from Gela, Sicily. It was called enkris (Greek: ἐγκρίς)—a dough-ball fried in olive oil, which he details in his Gastronomy; a work now lost, but partially preserved in the Deipnosophistae of Athenaeus, which mentions enkris thirteen times, in various inflected forms. The most complete description of it in the Deipnosophists is a passage that reads:

πεμμάτιον ἑψόμενον ἐν ἐλαίῳ καὶ μετὰ τοῦτο μελιτούμενον, μνημονεύει αὐτῶν Στησίχορος διὰ τούτων

χόνδρον τε καὶ ἐγκρίδας ἄλλα τε πέμματα καὶ μέλι χλωρόν.

There are cakes, also, called ἐγκρίδες. These are cakes boiled in oil, and after that seasoned with honey; and they are mentioned by Stesichorus in the following lines:—

Groats and encrides,

And other cakes, and fresh sweet honey.

The name struffoli originates from the Greek word strongoulos, which means 'rounded'.

== Similar dishes ==
- Piñonate (Andalusia)
- Gulab jamun (South Asia)
- Croquembouche (France)
- Lokma (Mediterranean basin)
- Pignolata (Sicily)
- Teiglach (Jewish cookies)
- Chak-Chak (Tatar, Bashkir and Central Asian dish)

== See also ==
Media related to Struffoli at Wikimedia Commons

- List of Italian desserts and pastries
- List of deep fried foods
- List of doughnut varieties
