= Gogoși =

Romanian deep-fried doughnut

- Type: Doughnut
- Course: Dessert
- Place of origin: Romania
- Main ingredients: Yeast dough; chocolate, jam, or cheese

Gogoși (Romanian: [ɡoˈɡoʃʲ]), known as pancove in Transylvania, pampuște in Bukovina and crofne in Banat are Romanian filled doughnuts. Gogoși is the plural form of the Romanian word gogoașă ([ɡoˈɡo̯a.ʃə]).

Gogoși are pieces of dough shaped into a flattened sphere that are deep-fried in oil and optionally dusted with icing sugar. They have a fluffy and airy consistency, no hole and are often filled. Gogoși fillings include chocolate, apricot jam, strawberry jam, cream cheese, or feta cheese.

== See also ==
- List of doughnut varieties
- List of deep fried foods
- List of fried dough foods
- List of pastries
