= Cruller =

Deep-fried donut-like pastry

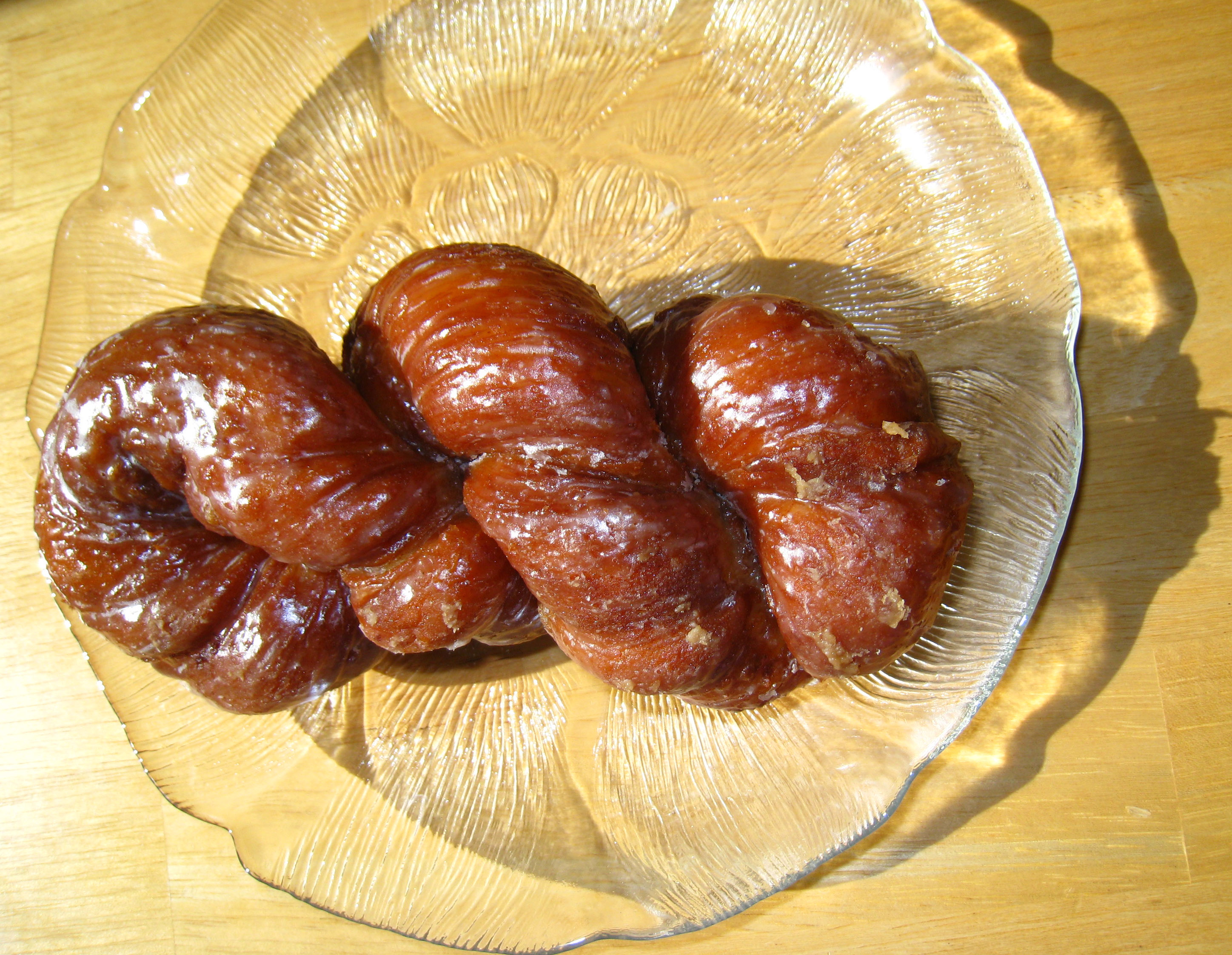
- Iced "cinnamon twist" cruller
- Alternative names: Twister
- Type: Pastry/Doughnut

A cruller (/ˈkrʌlər/) is a deep-fried pastry popular in parts of Europe and North America. In Europe, the distinct shape is typically formed in one of two ways: a string of dough folded over and twisted twice; or a rectangle of dough with a cut in the center, pulled over and through itself. In North America, it is typically a form of cake doughnut made in a small loaf or simple stick shape or, in the case of the "French cruller", extruded in a ring from choux pastry.

Crullers are typically topped with cinnamon sugar, dipped in plain icing, or served plain.

== History ==
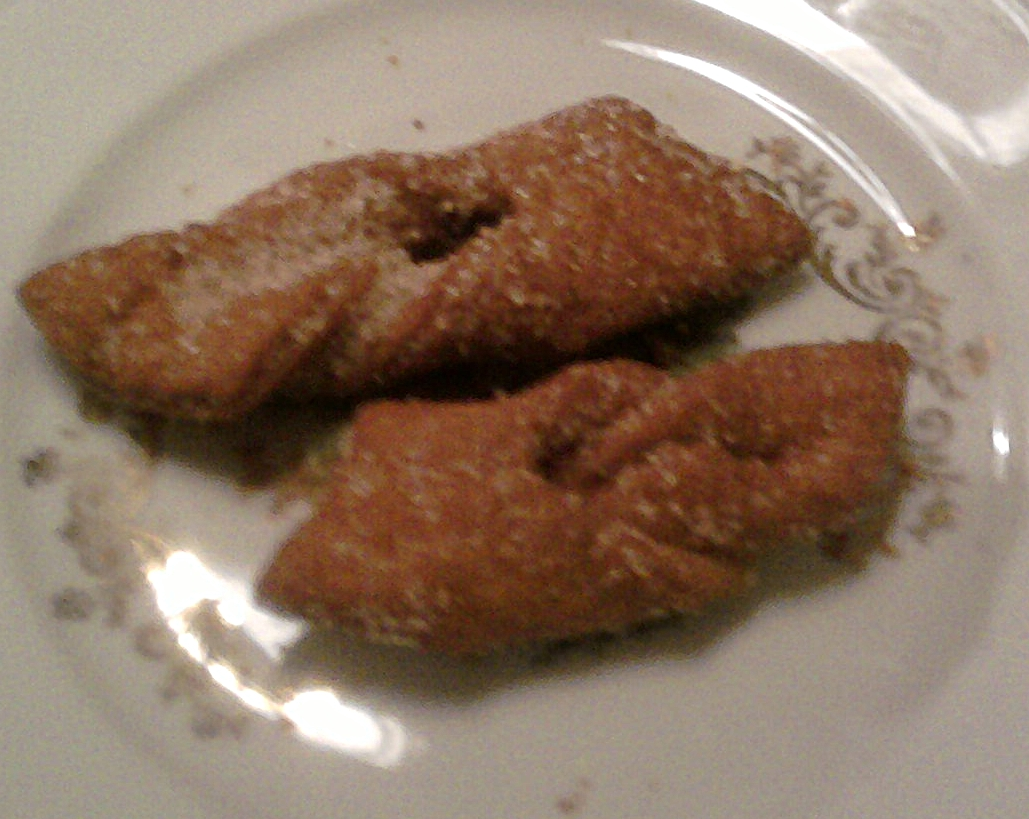
A handmade Danish klejne, a traditional cruller shape, rectangular with two twisted sides

The name cruller comes from the early 19th-century Dutch kruller, from krullen 'to curl'. In northern Germany they are known as Hirschhörner ('deer horns'). In Scandinavia, these types of crullers are common at Christmas. They are traditionally baked on New Year's Eve as a family project, with the children doing the labor-intensive shaping and the grown-ups handling the deep frying. In Danish they are known as klejner and in Swedish as klenäter, both names deriving from Low German.

In the United States, crullers were introduced in the late 18th and early 19th centuries by Pennsylvania Dutch settlers, and became popular in regions with large German populations. The Milwaukee-style cruller, for example, is a loaf-shaped glazed cake doughnut with a crunchy exterior.

The term "Chinese cruller" is occasionally applied to the youtiao (Chinese: 油条), a similar-looking fried dough food eaten in East and Southeast Asia. The term cruller is also associated with the mahua (Chinese: 麻花), a type of twisted fried dough much denser and sweeter than youtiao.

The "Aberdeen crulla" is a traditional Scottish pastry made in the same way as the rectangular, plaited cruller of New England. It is first attested in Edinburgh in 1829 and is thought to copied from the 'cruller' of the United States according to the Scottish National Dictionary (1931–1976). Distinct from this, the "yum-yum" is a commonly available treat in the United Kingdom, which resembles a straightened French cruller coated in thin glacé icing.

== French cruller ==
French cruller
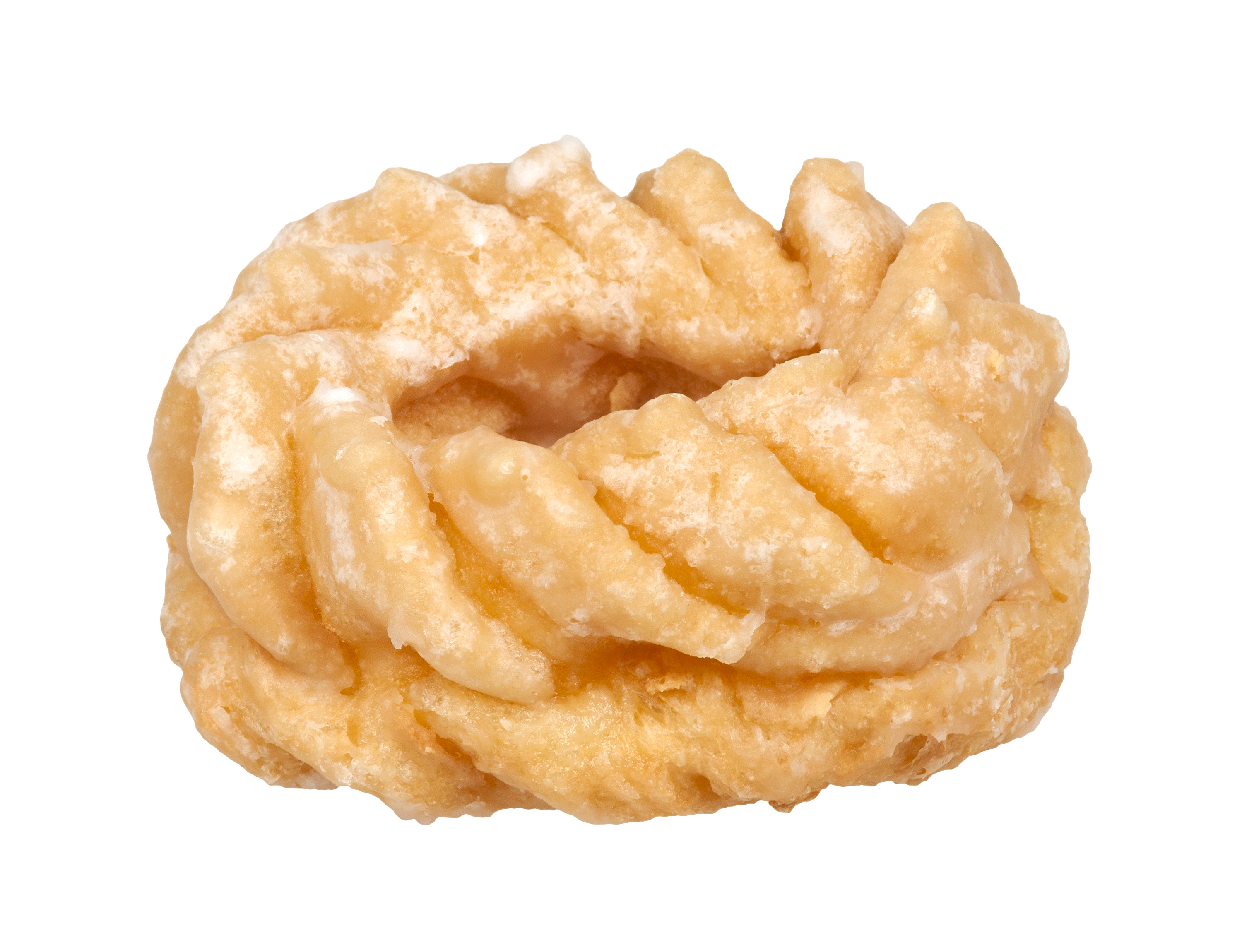
- A light and airy French cruller
- Alternative names: Spritzkuchen; Chouxnut
- Type: Pastry/Doughnut

A French cruller is a light, airy, fluted and ring-shaped glazed doughnut extruded from choux pastry. The name likely refers to the use of the French choux dough, with the actual origin of the pastry being German or Dutch, and was popularized in the United States by Dunkin' Donuts. When filled, they are often referred to as a chouxnut.

The French cruller is similar to the German Spritzkuchen (literally, 'extruded cake'), which is traditionally made from choux pastry that is piped onto parchment and then deep fried. It dates back to 18th century Nuremberg, but became associated with Eberswalde in the 19th century. It is said to have originated as part of carnival celebrations that take place before Lent to use up supplies of animal fats so they would not spoil and go to waste.

== Availability ==
Crullers are most commonly found in Canada, New England, the Mid-Atlantic and North Central states of the United States; they are also common in California. The German origin is probably why traditional crullers can be found more easily in the Midwest, where many German immigrants settled. Some family-owned bakeries still call them "krullers."

In 2003, the Dunkin' Donuts chain of doughnut shops stopped carrying traditional crullers, claiming that the hand-shaped rectangular treats were too labor-intensive, and couldn't be simulated with new machines for mixing doughnut batter. In its place, some of the chain’s franchises began to offer a simplified, machine-made rectangular version called a "cake stick".

As of 2003, the company still sold "French crullers", which can be formed by a kind of extruding nozzle similar to the way choux pastry is piped.

French crullers have been gaining popularity in the UK, Australia, and the United States, with specific mentions of Cardabelle in the UK, Moon Cruller in Australia, and Deli Provision in the United States. In the southeastern U.S., French crullers are a fresh-baked everyday bakery item at many doughnut shops and grocery stores. In 1973, the French cruller became available in Mister Donut stores in Japan.

Tim Hortons and Honey Dew Donuts sell only the French cruller, not traditional crullers. Krispy Kreme sells a similar doughnut that the company refers to as a cruller, but is a molded cake doughnut.

== See also ==
- List of doughnut varieties
- List of German desserts
- Angel wings, another twisted deep-fried dough
- Berliner (pastry), another doughnut popular in Germany
- Churros, a fried choux pastry originating in Spain and Portugal
- Fasnacht (pastry), another Shrove Tuesday related doughnut
- Fritter, another donut-like pastry
- King cake
- Koeksister, a twisted doughnut popular in South Africa
- Long John (doughnut), the common American rectangular doughnut, made from a yeast dough
- Maejap-gwa, a ribbon-shaped Korean pastry
- Oliebol, the basic Dutch doughnut
- Pilipit, a similar fried twisted doughnut from the Philippines
- Twisted doughnut
