= Dibile =

Turkish dessert

- Alternative names: Dible
- Course: Dessert
- Place of origin: Turkey
- Region or state: Aegean Region
- Created by: Ottoman cuisine
- Main ingredients: Dough, pekmez or honey

Dibile or Dible (Turkish: Dibile) is a Turkish dessert (originating with the semi-nomadic Yörüks) from the area of İzmir, made of thin sheet-like dough. They are essentially the same as angel wings, except that they are dipped in syrup rather than served dry. The dough is rolled into long, thin strips, fried and folded in hot oil and then dipped in a pekmez, sugar or honey syrup.

Dibile can be made in different shapes, of which the most common are bow ties and spirals. Dibile are a typical dessert in the İzmir and are also served at weddings and at ramadan.

Another form uses an iron mould dipped in dibile batter and cooked in cooking oil until the dibile separates from the mould. It is topped with syrup, crushed walnuts and cinnamon.

== See also ==
- List of doughnut varieties
- Rosette (cookie)
