= Smultring =

Norwegian doughnut

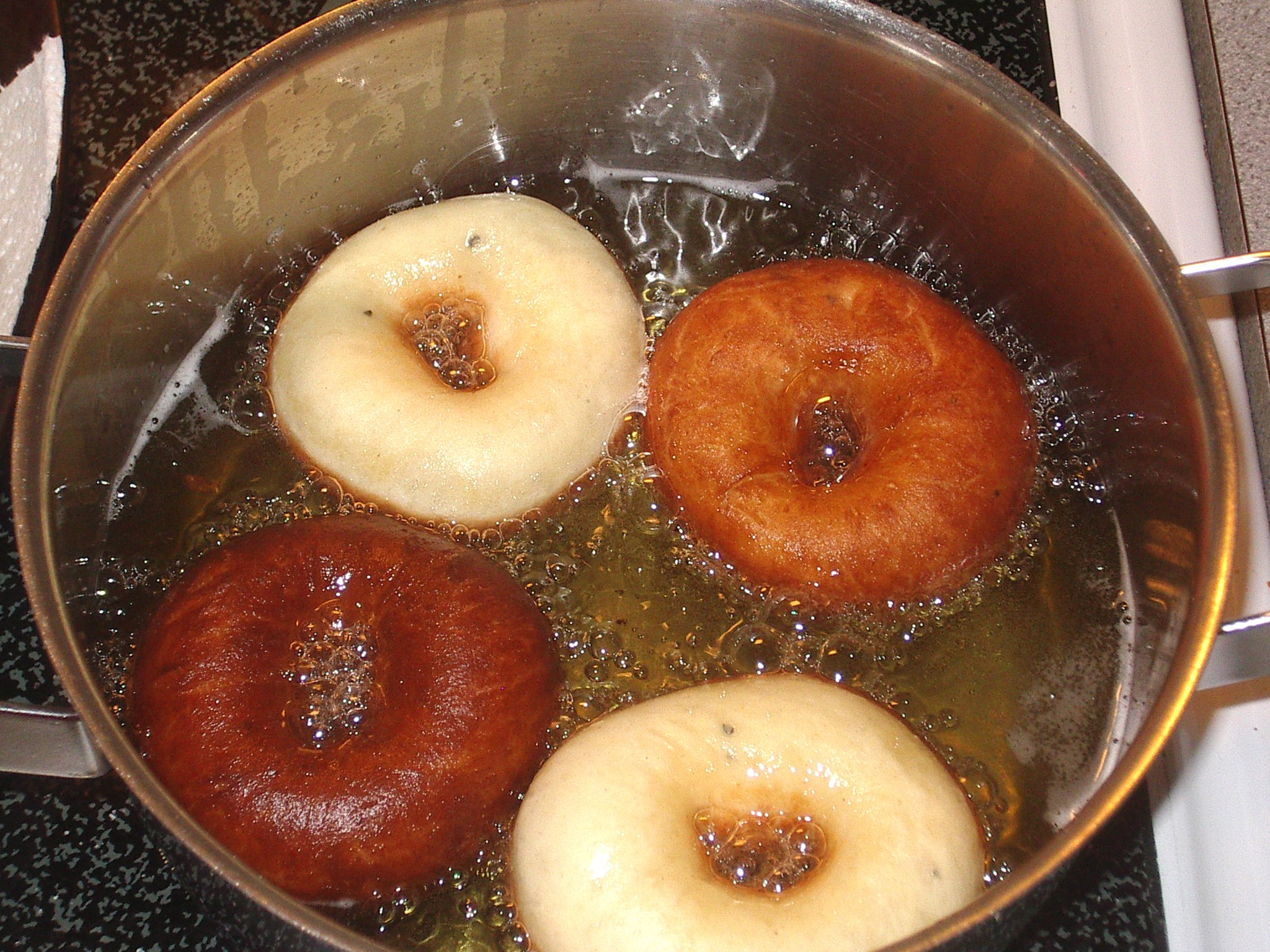
- Smultringer frying
- Type: Doughnut
- Place of origin: Norway
- Serving temperature: Hot or cold
- Main ingredients: Dough, cardamom

Smultring (pl. smultringer) and hjortetakk (sometimes spelled hjortebakkels) are cake doughnuts from Norway. They are small and usually prepared without glazing or filling, and are often spiced with cardamom, cinnamon, lemon, or orange zest, as well as various liqueurs.

== Overview ==
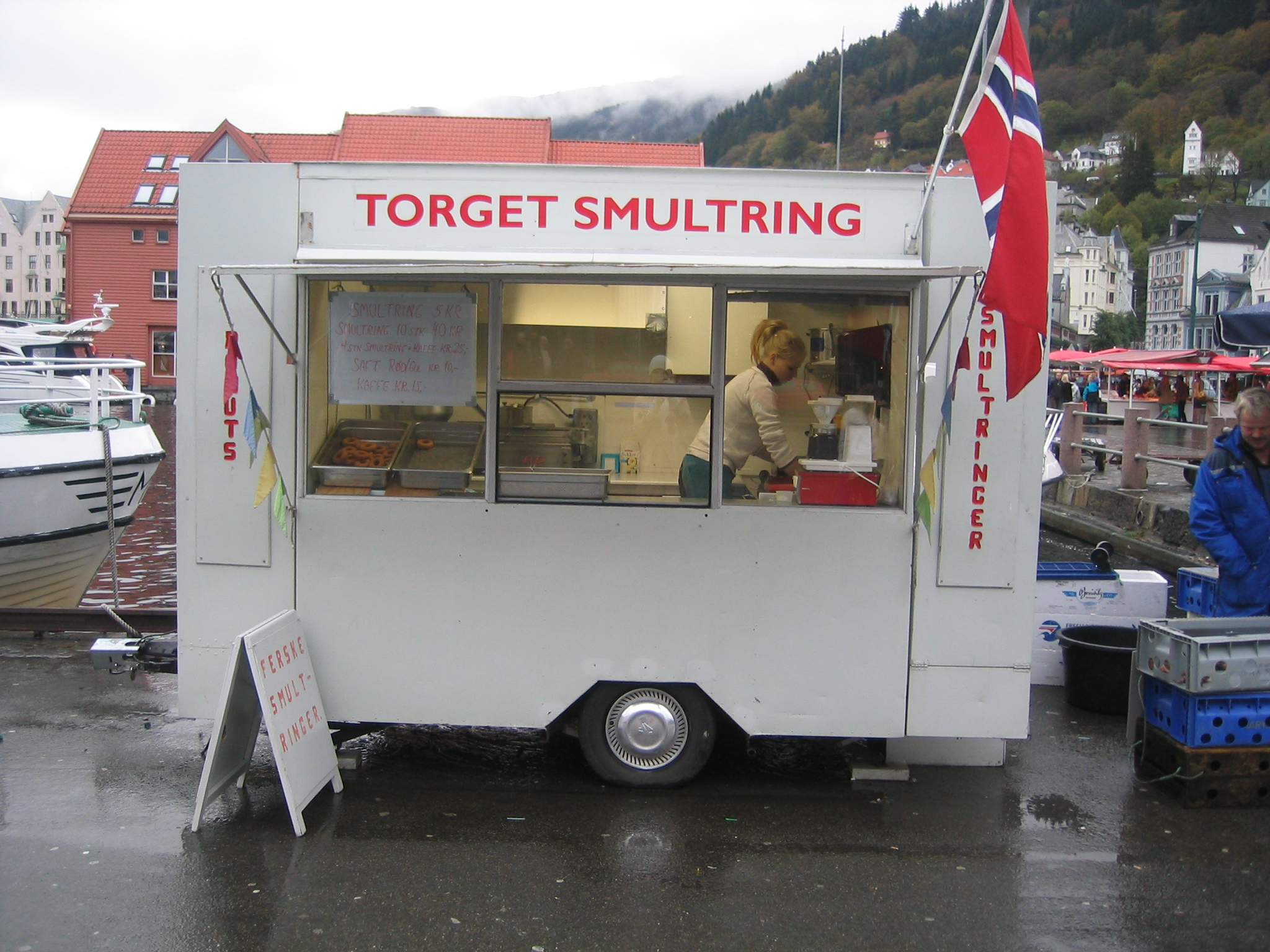
A smultring vendor in Norway

Smultringer (lit. 'lard rings') are torus-shaped and sold from trucks and, at Christmas time, from stalls. They are described as being "thick, heavy dough fried in lard that are best eaten while hot and with the grease still dripping". Smultringer are popular with expatriate Norwegians, including those in Minnesota who serve them with krumkake and riskrem (rice whipped cream), and fattigmann at Christmas dinners.

Hjortebakkels are made from rolls of dough looped with the ends overlapping. Brandy is often used as an ingredient. The Norwegian name comes from the fact that hartshorn (ammonium carbonate) was traditionally used as a raising agent.

== See also ==
- List of Norwegian desserts
- List of doughnut varieties
- List of fried dough foods
- Gløgg
