= Fánk =

Hungarian doughnut

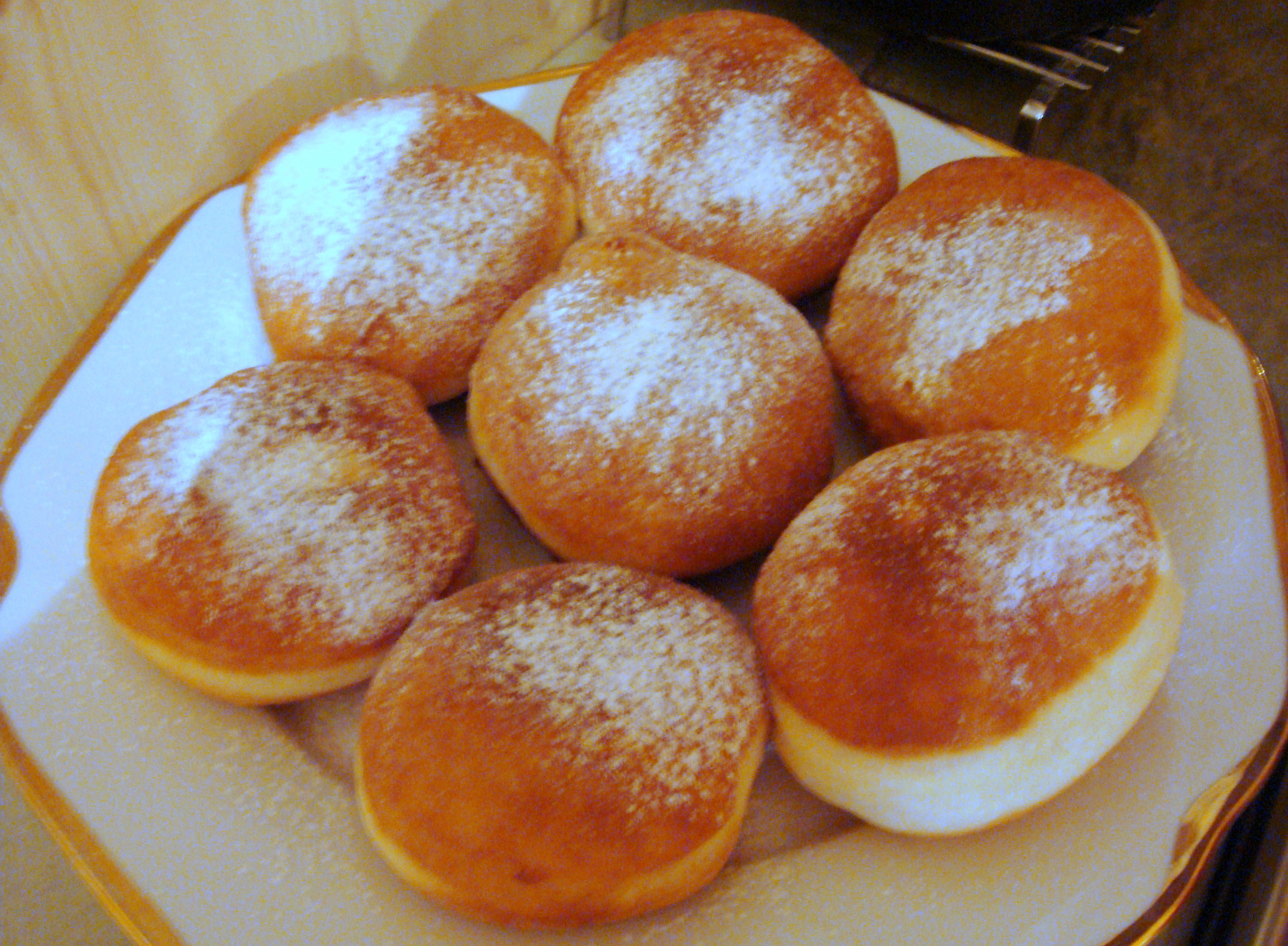
- Fánk, a Hungarian donut for Mardi Gras from the Farsang carnival season preceding the final Busójárás, (Ash Wednesday).
- Type: donut
- Place of origin: Hungary
- Main ingredients: Flour, yeast, butter, egg yolk, rum, milk, oil

Fánk (Hungarian pronunciation: [ˈfaːŋk]) is a sweet traditional Hungarian donut. The most commonly used ingredients are: flour, yeast, butter, egg yolk, a little bit of rum, salt, milk and oil to deep fry with. After the pastry has risen for approximately 30 minutes the result is a light doughnut-like pastry. Fánk is traditionally served with powdered sugar and lekvár, Hungarian thick jams, which mostly consists of apricot jam.

== See also ==
- List of doughnut varieties
