= Khanom wong =

Thai doughnut

Khanom wong (Thai: ขนมวง, pronounced [kʰā.nǒm wōŋ]; also referred to as khao mun khuai) is a traditional Thai-style donut that tastes sweet and salty, similar to an American donut. It is made in a similar fashion to pies. Molasses is usually dropped around the center at the top.

== History ==
Khanom wong originates from the northernmost areas of Northern Province, later spreading throughout the rest of the Northern Province of Thailand.

== See also ==
- Thai cuisine
- List of Thai desserts
- Khanom khai hong – another Thai-style donut
