= Kreppel =

Kreppel is a surname. Notable people with the surname include:

- Amie Kreppel, American political scientist
- Jonas Kreppel (1874–1940), Austrian-Jewish scholar, writer, and publicist
- Paul Kreppel (born 1947), American actor and director
- Walter Kreppel (1923–2003), German bass singer

== See also ==
- Berliner (doughnut)
