= Pignolata =

Sicilian pastry

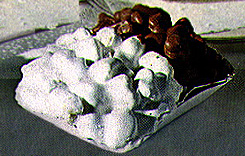
- A pignolata from Messina, with both chocolate and lemon icing
- Type: Pastry
- Place of origin: Messina, Sicily
- Main ingredients: Pastry dough, chocolate and lemon flavoured syrup/icing

Pignolata (Sicilian: pignulata) is a Sicilian pastry originating in the city of Messina. It is a soft pastry, covered in chocolate and lemon-flavoured syrup or icing. This pastry is half covered or iced in one flavouring and the other half in the other flavour, which hardens when the pignolata is ready to be served. Each pastry serves several people, and is meant to be cut into small pieces when served. In Sicily, this dessert was made for Carnival, the last celebration before Lent begins on Ash Wednesday.

Pignolata can be also made of small portions of fried pastry, like large pearls, in a hot honey sauce, with chopped almonds or hazelnuts. Before serving, they are set on a plate, as a crown, with chopped nuts sprinkled over the top.

== See also ==
- Pinolate (cookie)
- Sicilian cuisine
- List of Italian desserts and pastries
- List of doughnut varieties
