= Klenät =

Nordic fried pastry

Kleina
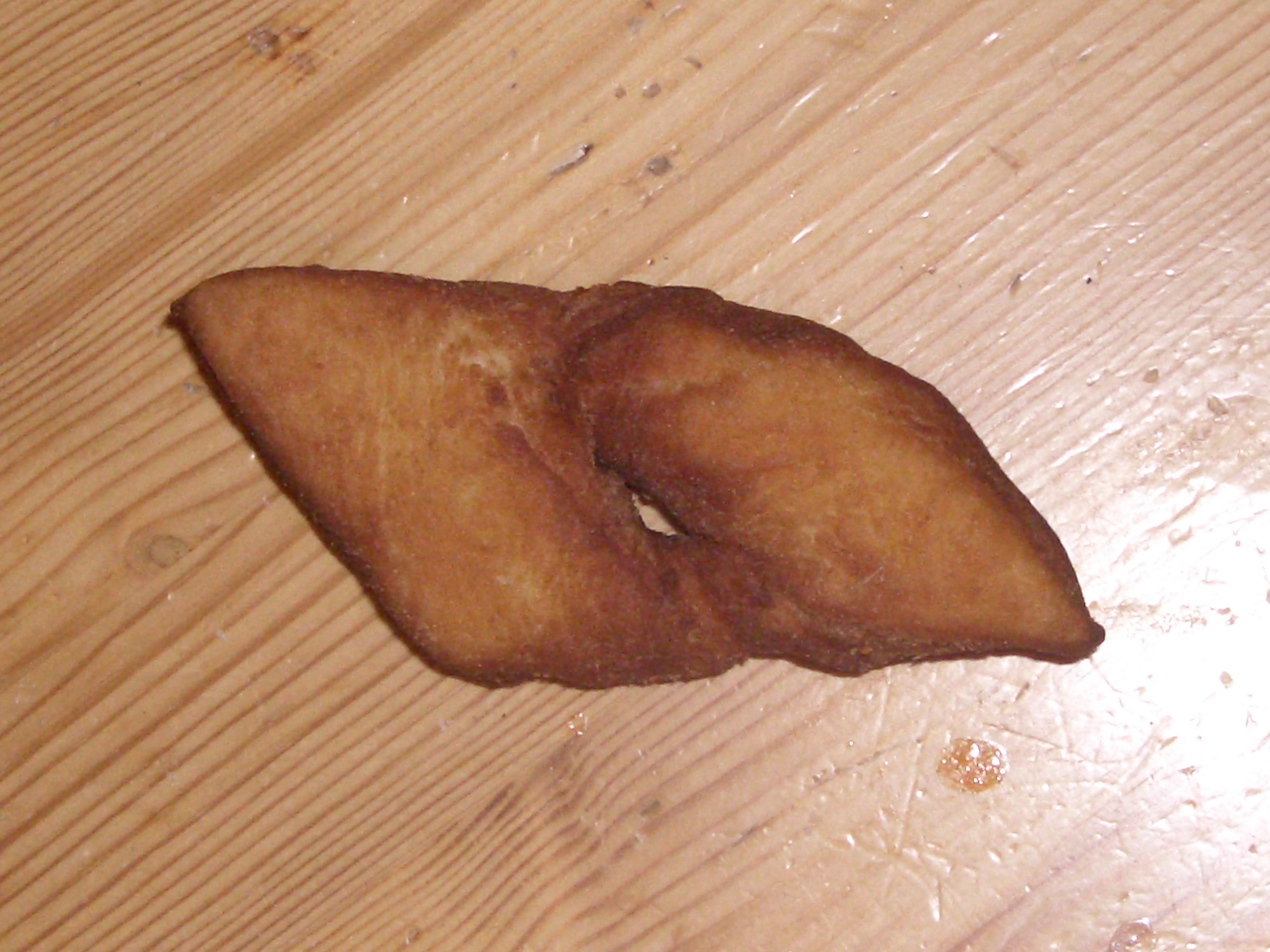
- Alternative names: Klena, Klejne, Kleina, Kleyna, Fattigmann
- Type: Doughnut
- Region or state: Northern Europe
- Main ingredients: Flour, egg yolks, sugar, margarine or butter

Klenät, kleinur, klena, klejne, kleina, kleyna, and fattigmann are all names for angel wings, a fried pastry common in the Nordic countries as well as the rest of Europe and the United States. In nearby countries (such as Lithuania, is found under the name žagarėliai or in Latvia under the name žagariņi or zaķauši depends on region) and Eastern European countries (such as Romania under the name of minciunele or Poland under the name ‘’faworki ‘’ or Russia, under the name krepli, Russian: крепли). The name originates from Low German "Kleinet" meaning "little object" or "present", which may indicate that the pastry was originally German. It is made from flattened dough cut into small trapezoids. A slit is cut in the middle and then one or both ends pulled through the slit to form a "knot". The kleina is then deep-fried in oil or another kind of fat. Subsequently can be sprinkled with powdered sugar and cinnamon. In Spain they are called pestiños and are usually glazed with honey or cinnamon sugar.

In Scandinavia, klenäter are traditionally eaten around Christmas, most commonly in the southern parts of Sweden, and Iceland, Norway, the Faroe Islands, Greenland and Denmark, the Baltic states, as well as Northern Germany. They may be sprinkled with sugar. Icelandic Kleinur are a very common everyday pastry, sold in bakeries (singly) and stores (in bags of ten or so) all around the country, and eaten plain.

Kleinur are similar to the American cruller.

== History ==
Klenäter are an old type of pastry and are mentioned in Denmark as early as the 14th century and appearing in Danish and Icelandic cookbooks in the 18th century and 19th century. They are also referenced in a Swedish poem by Anna Maria Lenngren from 1800, called Grevinnans besök (English: The Countess' Visit). In the poem, a countess is invited to a dinner party at the home of a pastor, where she is served klenäter as part of the entrée. Klenäter also frequently appear in Christmas stories by famous Swedish author Selma Lagerlöf, winner of the Nobel Prize in Literature in 1909.

== Regional variations ==
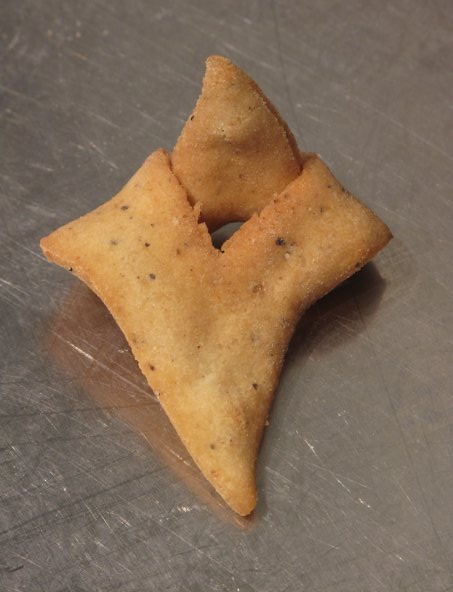
In Norway, klenäter are known as Fattigmann and tend to be made with cardamom.

In Norway, klenäter are known as fattigmann (English: poor man), or fattigmannsbakkels (English: poor man's pastry), because, it was said, the high cost of making the cookies could leave you impoverished (fattig). This is however a myth. Fattigmann tend to be made with cinnamon, cardamom, and a dash of cognac as well as the other ingredients listed below.

They are also eaten in the areas of North America where Scandinavians settled during the nineteenth century and the beginning of the twentieth century.

A similar pastry called "calzones rotos" (literally "broken panties") is eaten during winter in Chile, another similar pastry is commonly eaten in southern Brazil called "cueca virada" (meaning "twisted panties").

== Preparation ==
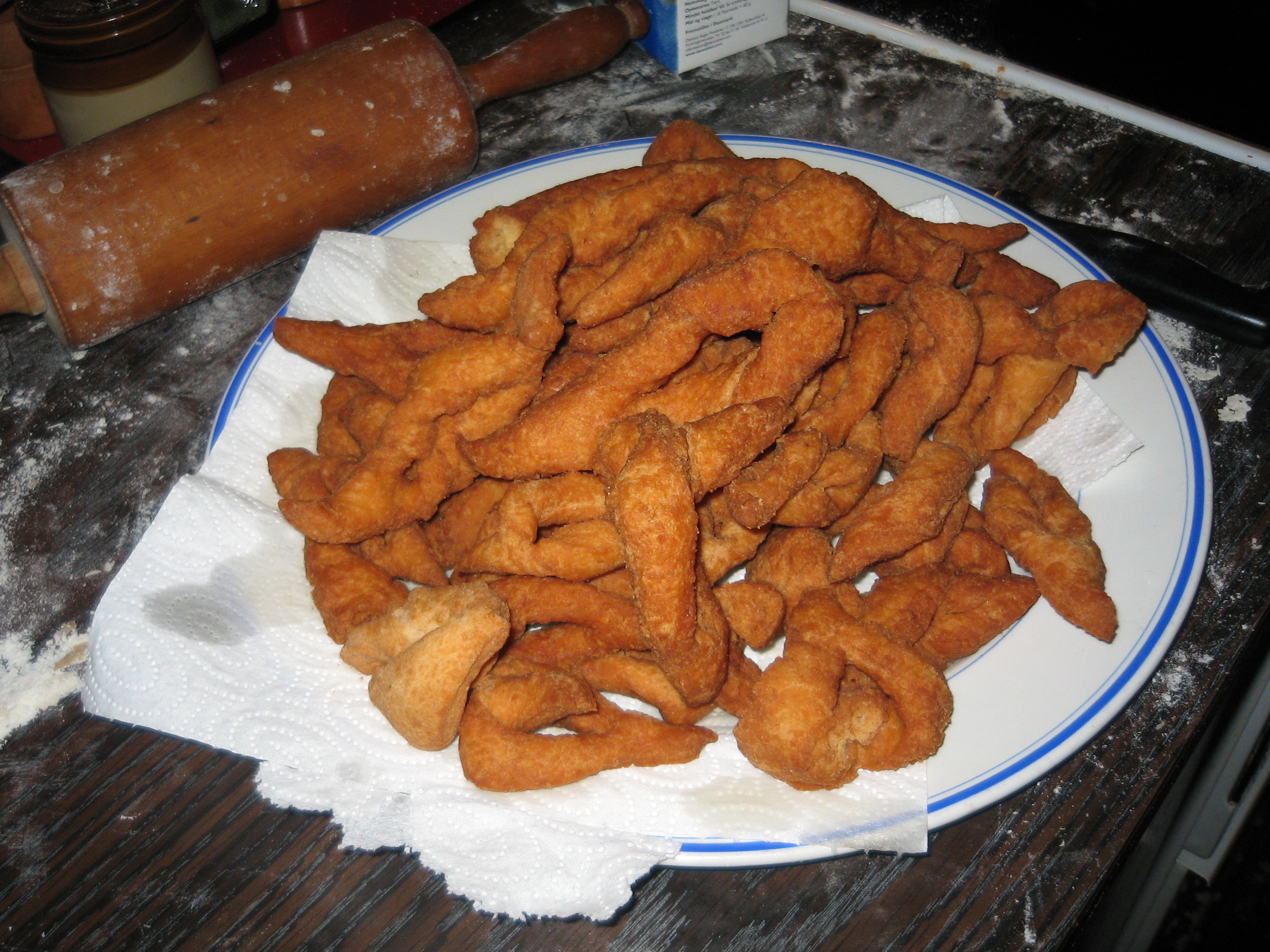
Preparing klejner in Denmark

The dough for klenäter is made from flour, egg yolks, sugar, and margarine or butter. The dough is rolled out and then cut into strips, in Iceland often with a special cutting wheel called a kleinujárn. (A pizza cutter can also be used.) The size may vary, but about 10 centimetres (4 in) long is typical. The uncooked strips are covered with plastic wrap and left to rest for two hours in a cold place. They are then fried in oil or sometimes lard and the dough expands into shape. Traditionally, Icelanders fried kleinur in sheep tallow, but today oil is typically used.

Lemon juice, brännvin, or cognac are optional ingredients in klenäter. Water mixed with acetic acid can be used instead. An alternative type of klenäter is smördegsklenätter (English: puff pastry klenäter).

Klenäter should be kept in a dry place. The non-fried dough can be preserved in a refrigerator for a week. Klenäter are best served medium-warm and newly baked.

== See also ==
- List of doughnut varieties
- List of breakfast foods
