= Krofne =

Balkan doughnuts

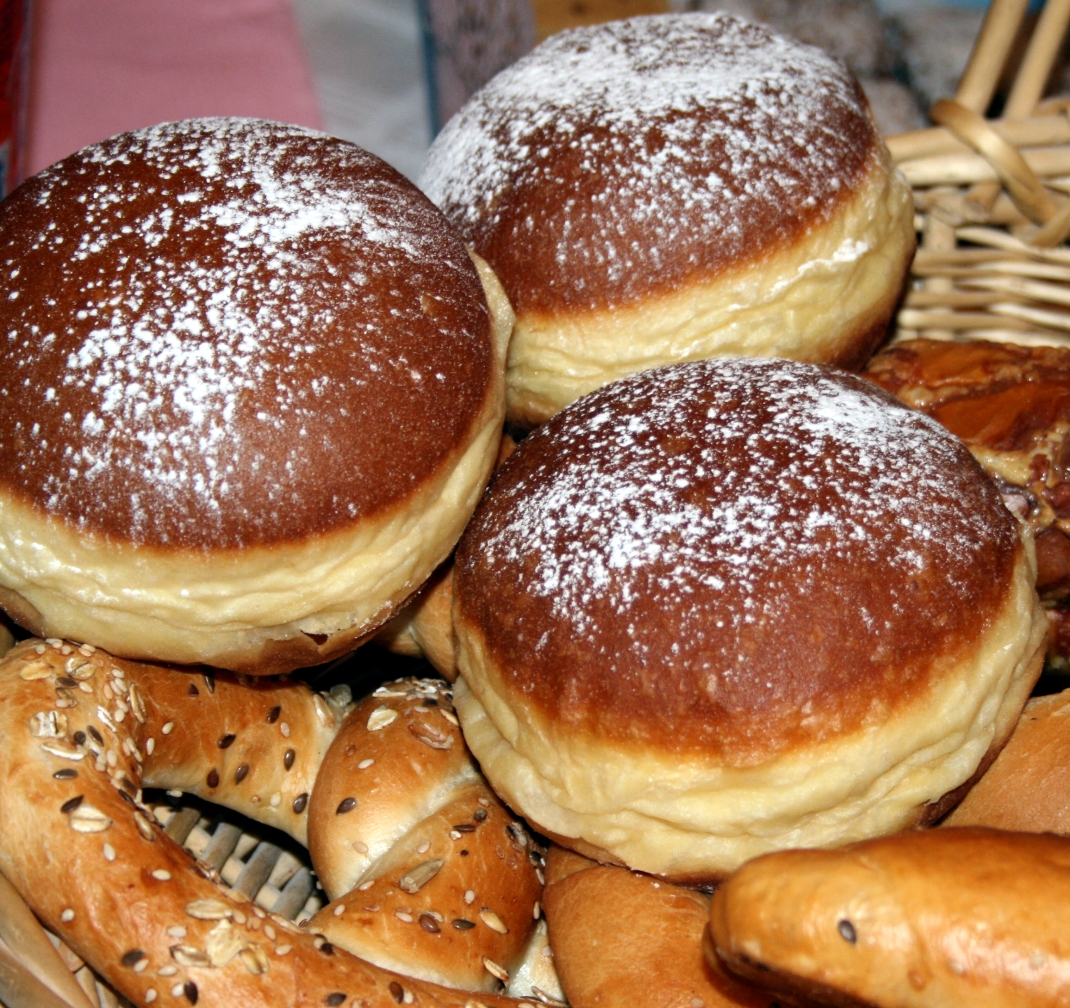
- Alternative names: Krafne, krofi, krofni, crofne
- Type: Doughnut
- Region or state: Balkans
- Main ingredients: Yeast, milk, sugar, flour, butter, eggs, rum, lemon peel Filling: jelly, marmalade, jam, chocolate, custard, or cream; powdered sugar

Krofne (Albanian and Croatian: krafne; Bosnian and Serbian: krofne, Serbian Cyrillic: крофне; Romanian: crofne; Slovene: krofi; Macedonian: крофни) are airy filled doughnuts. They are round and usually filled with jelly, marmalade, jam or chocolate as well as butter, Nutella and cinnamon. They can also be filled with custard, or cream, but that is usually less common. The name comes from German Krapfen, and it is a variation of the Central European pastry known as the Berliner. They are also similar to beignets.

The recipe for homemade krofne includes yeast, milk, sugar, flour, salt, butter, eggs, rum, lemon peel, marmalade and powdered sugar. The dough is kneaded and prepared and then cut into small pieces, then made into a little ball, making it easier to cook.

In Serbia, Croatia and Slovenia, the consumption of krafne, or krofi, increases significantly during the yearly winter festival of Carnival. In Croatia, they are served on New Year's Day as a good-luck token as well as for prosperity, as well as for other holidays such as Easter and Christmas.

== Gallery ==
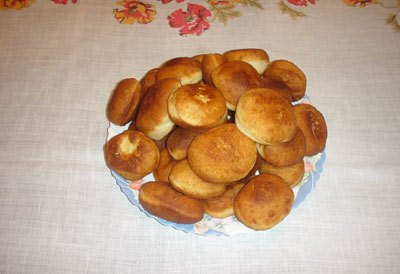

== See also ==
- List of doughnut varieties
- List of fried dough foods
- Jelly doughnut
- List of custard desserts
