= Khanom khai hong =

Thai fried dough balls with mung bean filling

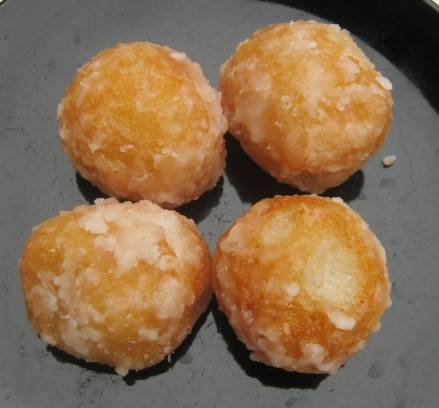
- Alternative names: Khanom khai hia
- Type: Fried dough
- Course: Dessert, snack
- Place of origin: Thailand
- Region or state: Nationwide
- Main ingredients: Glutinous rice flour, rice flour, mashed potato (or sweet potato in some variations), mung bean filling seasoned with pepper and salt, coconut milk (in sweet versions), crystallized sugar or sesame seed coating
- Variations: Salty filling (sugar-coated), sweet filling (sesame-coated)
- Similar dishes: Khanom khai tao, khanom khai nok krata, khanom nga tod

Khanom khai hong (Thai: ขนมไข่หงส์, pronounced [kʰānǒm kʰàj hǒŋ]) is a traditional Thai fried dessert consisting of deep-fried dough balls filled with seasoned mung bean paste. The balls are typically coated with crystallized sugar or white sesame seeds, creating a crispy exterior and a soft, chewy interior. The flavour combines sweetness, saltiness, and a subtle spiciness from black pepper.

The name literally means "swan egg snack", reflecting its oval, egg-like shape. It was originally called khanom khai hia (Thai: ขนมไข่เหี้ย, [kʰā.nǒm kʰàj hîa̯]), meaning "water monitor lizard egg snack", but was renamed because the word hia (water monitor) is considered inauspicious in Thai culture.

The dessert is sold by street vendors and at markets throughout Thailand, though it has become rarer in urban areas.

== History ==
Khanom khai hong originated in the early Rattanakosin Kingdom period and is traditionally attributed to Royal Concubine Waen (Thai: เจ้าจอมแว่น), a favourite consort of King Phutthayotfa Chulalok (Rama I, r. 1782–1809). According to historical accounts, the king enjoyed eating water monitor eggs (often paired with mangosteen), but they were out of season. The dessert was created to mimic the shape and texture of those eggs.

It was initially called khanom khai hia after the eggs it replaced, but the name was later changed to khanom khai hong to avoid negative connotations associated with water monitors in Thai belief.

Concubine Waen was the daughter of a noble from Vientiane and entered the Thai court after the 1778–1779 campaign against Vientiane. She was renowned for her culinary skills.

== Ingredients ==
The dough is made primarily from glutinous rice flour and rice flour, often with mashed potato or sweet potato added for texture and to prevent cracking during frying. Coconut milk, sugar, and water are also incorporated.

The filling is mung bean paste seasoned with coriander root, garlic, white pepper, sugar, and salt (salty version) or sweetened with coconut milk (sweet version).

After wrapping the filling in dough and shaping into ovals, the balls are deep-fried until golden and then coated in crystallized sugar or rolled in sesame seeds.

== Variations ==
The classic version has a salty-spicy mung bean filling and is coated in crystallized sugar. A sweeter variant, often sold alongside it and sometimes confused with khanom khai hong, uses coconut milk in the filling and is coated in sesame seeds; this is more properly called khanom nga tod or ituay.

Regional names include khanom khai hia (original), khai sawan ("heavenly egg"), fong hia, and fong lan. Similar snacks include khanom khai tao ("turtle eggs", unfilled) and khanom khai nok krata ("quail eggs").

== Cultural significance ==
Khanom khai hong exemplifies royal Thai culinary innovation from the early Bangkok period and cultural exchange in the region. The deliberate name change reflects Thai linguistic taboos and the importance of auspicious names in food culture.

Today it is nostalgic street food, often sold from bicycles with vendors calling "khai hong!". It has become rarer in cities due to health concerns but is frequently revived through home cooking videos and food blogs.
