= Angel wings =

Sweet crisp pastry

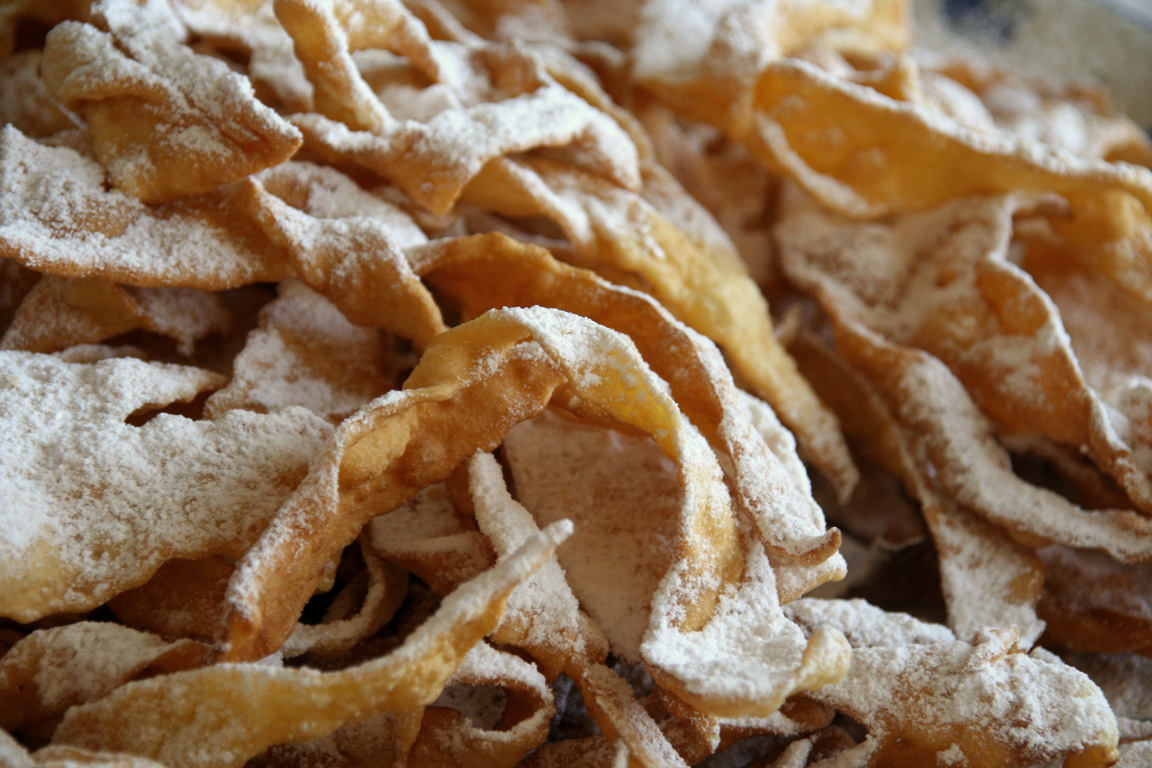
- Main ingredients: Dough and powdered sugar

Angel wings are a traditional sweet crisp pastry made out of dough that has been shaped into thin twisted ribbons, deep-fried, and sprinkled with powdered sugar. Common to many European cuisines, angel wings have been incorporated into other regional cuisines (such as American cuisine) by immigrant populations. They are most commonly eaten in the period just before Lent, often during Carnival and on Fat Thursday, the last Thursday before Lent.

== Alternative names ==
In the various national cuisines, angel wings are referred to as:

- Bashkurt: ҡош теле, qush tili ('bird tongue')
- Belarusian: хрушчы, chruščy, or фаворкі, favorki
- Bulgarian: фаворки, favorki
- Chilean Spanish: calzones rotos ('torn panties')
- Croatian: krostole, kroštule
- Czech: boží milosti
- Danish: klejner
- French: bugnes, merveilles, oreillettes
- German: Fasnachtschüechli, Raderkuchen, Mutzenblätter
- Greek: δίπλες, diples (or thiples)
- Hungarian: csöröge fánk, forgácsfánk
- Italian: chiacchiere ('chatter'), bugie ('lies'), cenci ('rags'), crostoli, frappe, galani, grostoli, sfrappole, nocche, guanti ('gloves')
- Judeo-Spanish: fiyuelas, fazuelos
- Latvian: žagariņi ('twigs'), zaķauši ('rabbit ears')

- Latgalian: žagareni

- Lithuanian: žagarėliai ('twigs, sticks')
- Maltese: xkunvat
- Norwegian: fattigmann ('poor man')
- Tibetan cuisine: Khapse, Khapsey
- Polish: faworki, chruściki, chrusty
- Portuguese: orelha de gato, cueca virada, filhós, coscorão, cavaquinho, crostoli
- Romanian: minciunele, uscatele; regionally: cirighele
- Russian: хворост, khvorost ('twigs, sticks'), sometimes called "Russian twig cookies"
- Russian-Canadian Doukhobor dialect: орешки, oreshki ('nuts')
- Slovak: fánka, čeregi
- Slovenian: flancati
- Spain: pestiños
- Swedish: klenäter
- Tatar: кош теле, kush tili ('bird tongue')
- Ukrainian: вергуни, verhuny
- Uzbek: qush tili ('bird tongue')
- Yiddish: כרוסט

== Variants ==
=== Bulgaria ===
In Bulgaria, angel wings are called kukurini, and are only found in Bansko, southwestern Bulgaria. They are typically sprinkled with powdered sugar.

=== Croatia and Slovenia ===
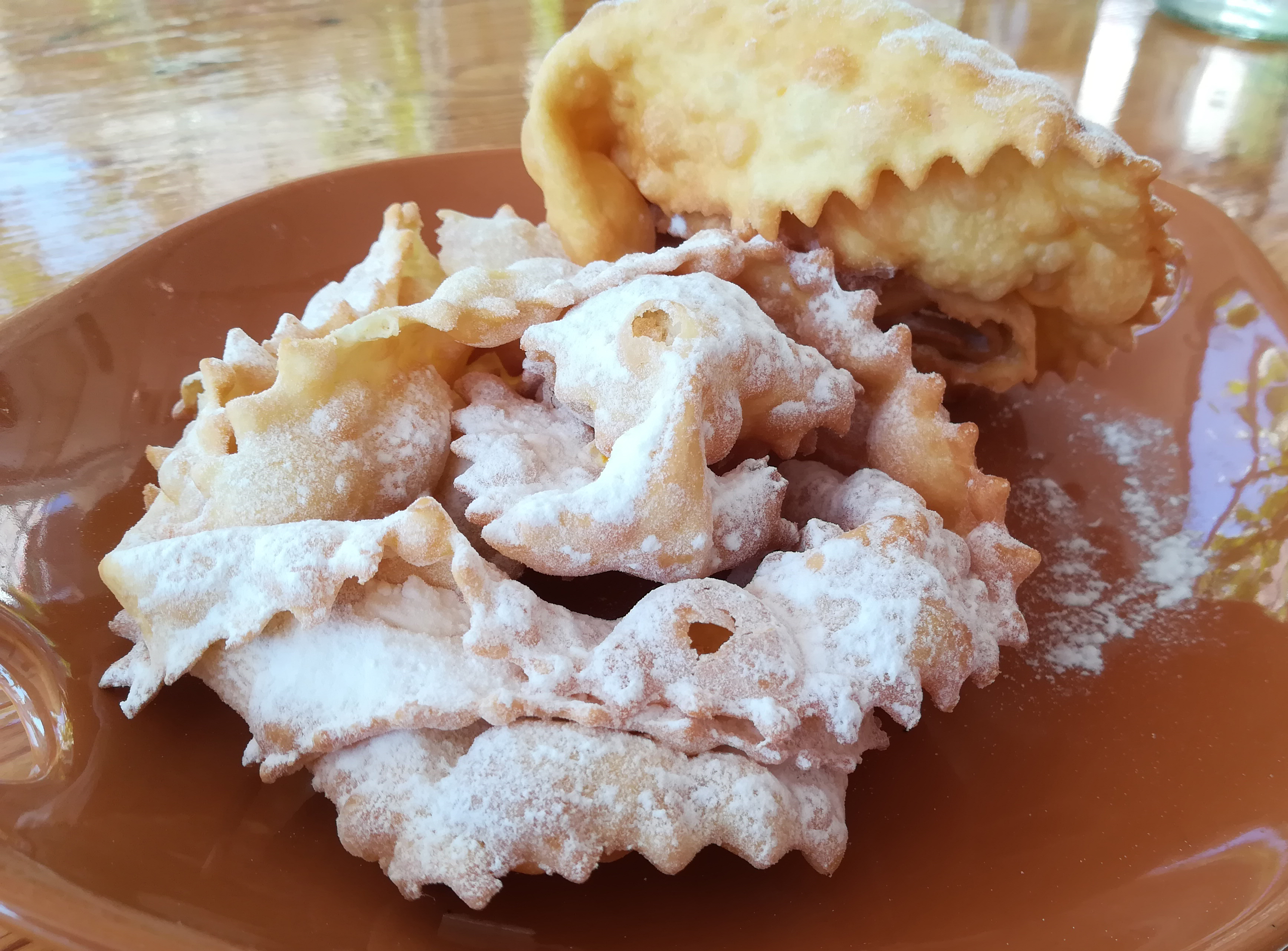
Kroštule

Kroštule are a traditional Croatian pastry from Dalmatia and Istria, also popular in coastal Slovenia as hroštule. It is made from deep frying dough.

=== France ===
In France, the fried pastry are made in central-eastern France, including Lyon and Saint-Étienne, and are closely related to beignets. Traditionally, Lyon cold meat shops sold bugnes just before Lent, due to their high fat content. They are also made in the home as a way of using surplus cooking fat, which would be wasted during Lent. More recently, bakeries make them, respecting more or less the tradition of Lent.

French bugnes varieties include crunchy bugnes and soft bugnes. The crunchy variety, known as bugnes lyonnaises ('Lyon bugnes'), are cooked in very hot oil with the dough spread out thinly and knotted once or twice. The soft variety, sometimes known as "pillows", are made with a thicker dough, which is rarely knotted.

=== Hungary ===
Hungarian csöröge are made from egg yolk, flour, a leavening agent, sugar, salt, and cognac or brandy. They are deep fried and sprinkled with powdered sugar. They are traditional at weddings.

=== Italy ===
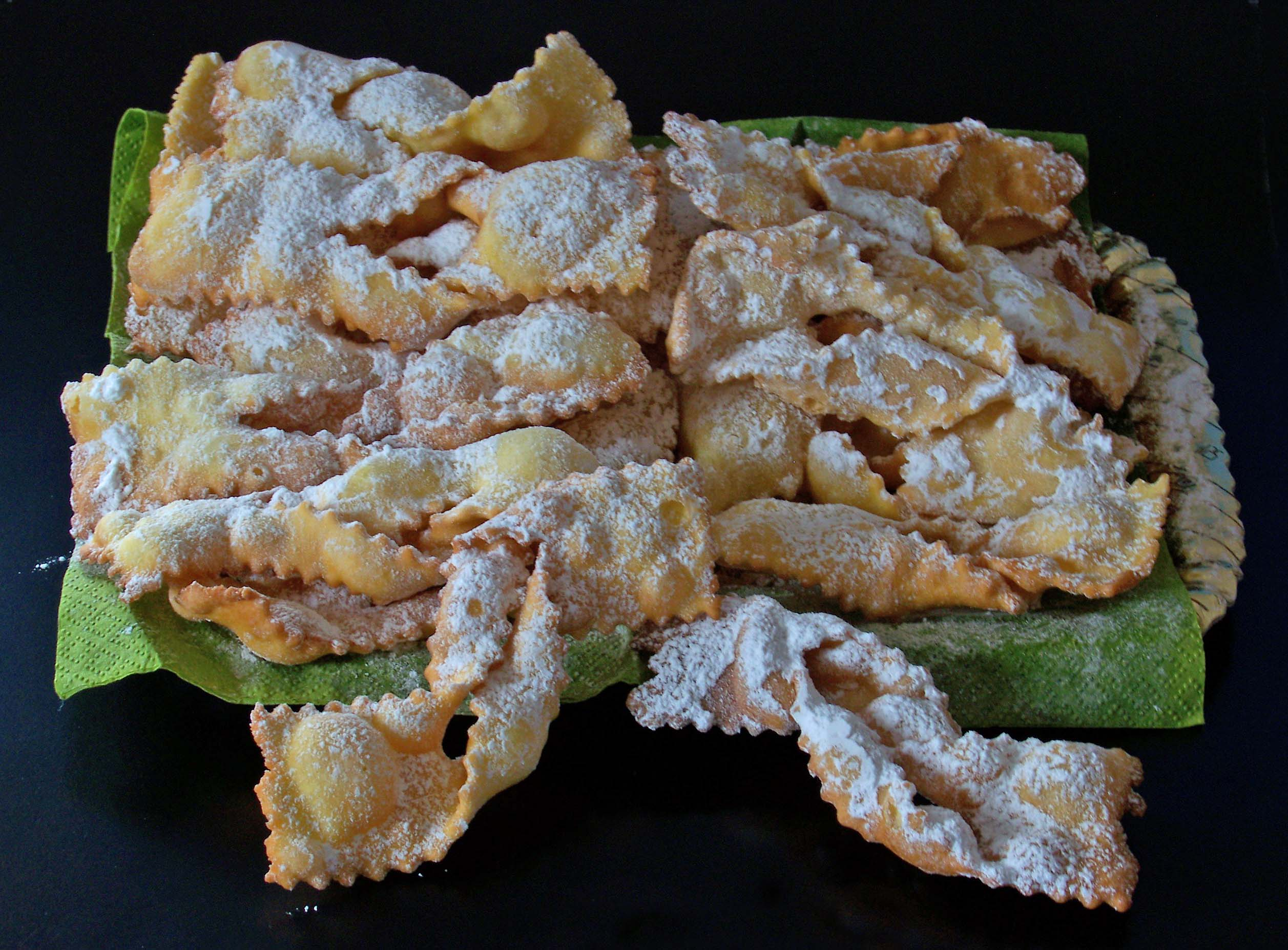
Chiacchiere

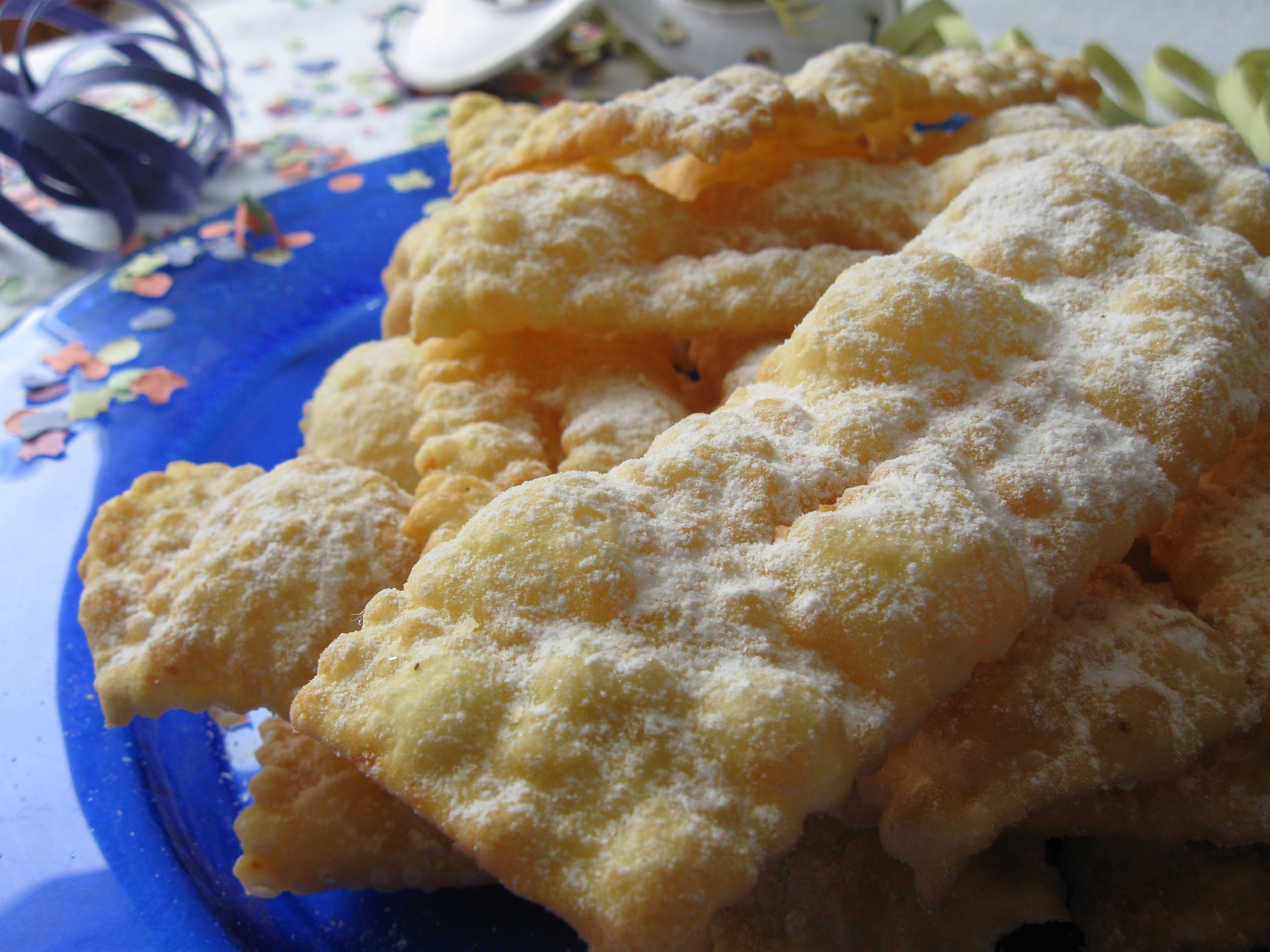
Homemade chiacchiere

Italian chiacchiere are eaten at Carnival time. Their various regional names include: frappe (a name shared with similar treats) in Lazio; sfrappole in Emilia-Romagna; bugie in Genoa and Piedmont; cenci in Tuscany; and galani or crostoli in Friuli-Venezia Giulia, Trentino-Alto Adige, and Veneto. Fritte and many other regional names exist. Regional variations in the recipe include sprinkling with citrus zest, typically orange or lemon, or using anisette wine as the alcoholic base. It is very common in Italian families to make them at home. They often accompany castagnole.

=== Lithuania ===
In Lithuania Žagarėliai (or "small sticks" in English) are delicate pastry dough cookies, deep fried.

Skruzdėlynas translates as 'anthill' in English and is layers of fried dough strips, covered in honey and topped with poppy seeds. It is a typical dessert served during Lithuanian family celebrations.

=== Poland ===
Faworki and chrusty are the plural forms of the words faworek and chrust respectively.

The Polish word faworki was the name reserved for colourful ribbons attached to either female or male clothing, especially ribbons given to medieval knights by their ladies. Etymologically the word faworki came to Poland from the French word faveur, meaning 'grace' or 'favour'.

The Polish word chrust means 'dry branches broken off trees' or 'brushwood'. Chruścik is a diminutive of chrust.

=== Ukraine ===
Verhuny are sweet cookies, fried in lard, which have the form of oblong strips. Verhuny are a Ukrainian confectionery with non-yeast dough, which includes flour, butter, eggs, sugar and additives such as alcohol (rum, brandy or horilka) or, in extreme cases, vinegar (vinegar sometimes together with alcohol). As substitute for butter, but more often as an additional component in verhuny, milk products (milk, smetana i.e. sour cream, or cream) are added. Traditionally, Ukrainian verhuny should only be fried in lard.

=== United States ===
In the United States, many ethnic bakeries in the cities of Cleveland, Chicago, Buffalo, and Detroit make angel wings, and they are especially popular during the holidays of Easter and Christmas.

== See also ==
Media related to Angel wings at Wikimedia Commons

- List of fried dough foods
- Maejap-gwa – a similarly shaped Korean pastry
