= Lalanga =

Greek and Turkish deep fried flatbread

- Alternative names: Lalanga
- Type: Fried flatbread
- Main ingredients: Flour, yeast, salt

Lalanga is a deep fried flatbread found in Greek and Turkish cuisines. Historically it was present in both Byzantine and Ottoman cuisines.

== Etymology and history ==
Lalanga was present both in the Byzantine and Ottoman cuisines; whilst in the former it was only eaten as a sweet, in Ottoman Turkey it was eaten both as a sweet dish with honey or as a savoury, with cheese. Lalanga continues to exist in the Turkish cuisine, as well as in the Greek Cuisine (mostly in Peloponnese) as Lalagia (In Greek Λαλάγγια).

== Varieties in Ottoman Cuisine ==
In the Ottoman printed cookbook, Ali Eşref Dede'nin Yemek Risalesi, there is a recipe as Lalanga.

== See also ==
- List of doughnut varieties
- List of deep fried foods
- Frybread
- Shelpek
- Bhatoora
- Mekitsa
- BeaverTails
