= Fried dough =

North American dessert

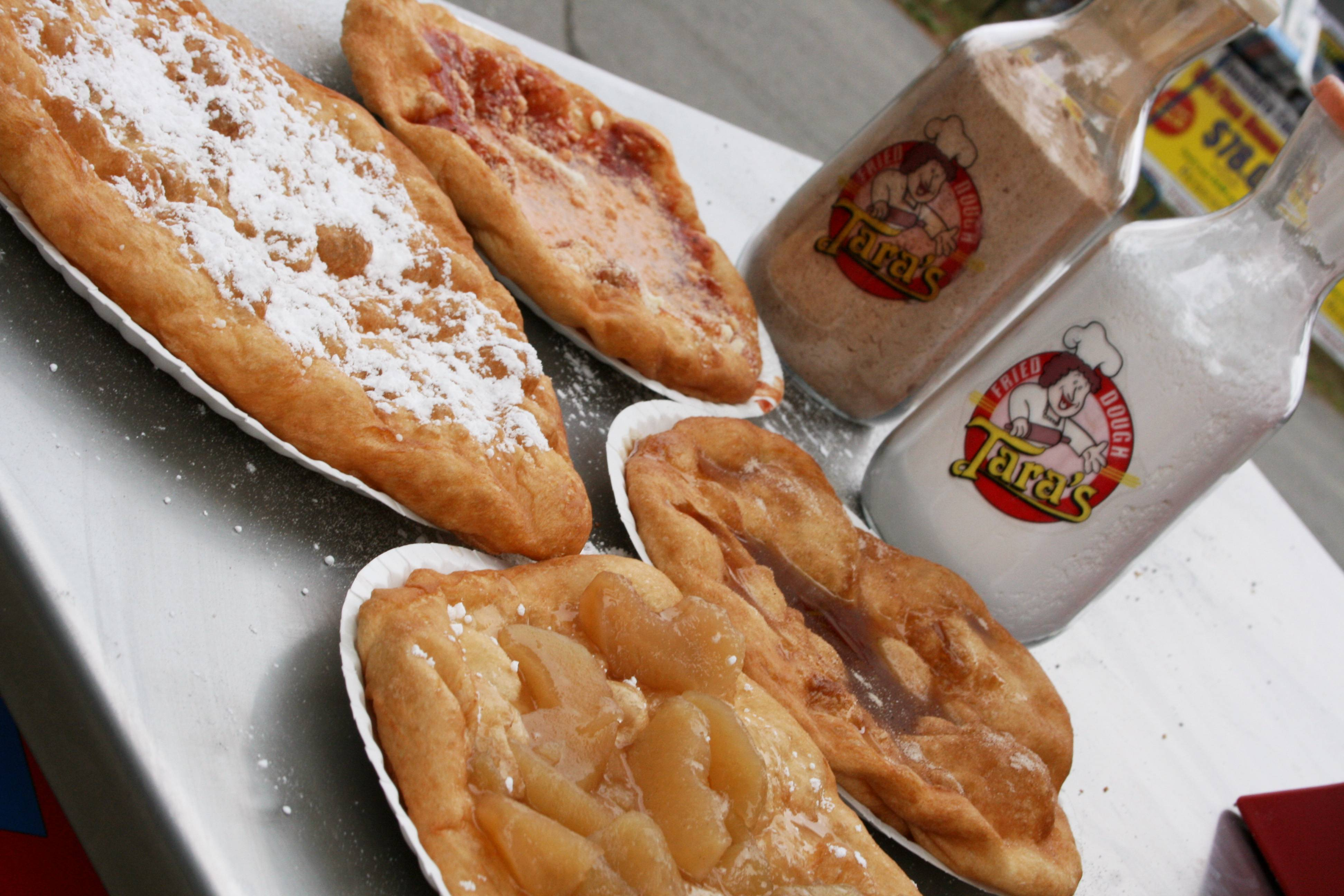
- Various fried dough toppings of Tara's Fried Dough at Sailfest in New London, Connecticut in 2009
- Alternative names: fry dough fry bread fried bread doughboys elephant ears scones flying saucers pizza fritte beaver tails safnaj sfenj
- Course: Breakfast, dessert, or snack
- Serving temperature: Warm
- Main ingredients: Yeast dough
- Variations: Zeppole and others

Fried dough is a food associated with outdoor food stands in carnivals, amusement parks, fairs, rodeos, and seaside resorts. Fried dough is also known as fry dough, fry bread (bannock), fried bread, doughboys, elephant ears, beaver tails, scones, pizza fritte, bawyrsaq, boorsok, shelpek, frying saucers (in the case of smaller pieces). These foods are virtually identical to each other and some yeast dough versions of beignets, and recognizably different from other fried dough foods such as doughnuts or fritters.

== Regional variants ==
In Canadian cuisine, pieces of fried dough are sometimes called beaver tails. According to Bill Castleman, a writer of books on Canadian word origins, the name referred to quick-baked dough "especially in early 19th-century places where people might camp for one night and where there was no frying pan." In 1978, Pam and Grant Hooker of Ottawa, Ontario, founded the BeaverTails chain of restaurants specializing in the sale of fried dough pastries which are hand stretched to the shape of a beaver's tail.

In Newfoundland, a province in Eastern Canada, fried dough is referred to as a "touton". A touton (pronounced /ˈtaʊtən/) is produced by frying bread dough on a pan with butter or the leftover fat from "scrunchions" (fried preserved pork) and served with dark molasses, maple syrup, or corn syrup. It is traditionally made from leftover bread dough and pan-fried, as opposed to deep-fried.

A smaller Italian variant common in North America is the zeppole.

Similar food is found in Europe, also typically from outdoor stands in fairs. For example, in Croatia, fried dough is known as languši, in Hungary as lángos, in Austria as kiachl, in Germany as Knieküchle while the oliebol is eaten in the Netherlands. In north Spain is typical of Carnival season and has a spiritual connection with it, just like 'roscón' in Christmas or 'arroz con leche' in Easter. In Bulgaria, a similar dish is called mekitsa.

In Russia a fried flatbread made from yeast dough is called pryazhenik (Russian: пряженик).

A type of soft, fried dough ball frequently coated in sugar can be found in some Chinese restaurants in New York. These dough balls are referred to by any one of a number of names, including but not necessarily limited to "sugar biscuits", "Chinese doughnuts", or the simpler "fried bread".

Turkic countries in Central Asia also have a similar food called Boortsog or Pişi.

In New Zealand and other areas such as Hawaii, the Māori people cook Parāoa Parai, a fry bread that is a traditional part of a Matariki feast.

In Honduras, there is a fried dough made with flour called a macheteada.

== Preparation ==
Fried dough is made by deep-frying a portion of risen yeast dough. The dough acquires an irregular, bubbly appearance from being fried.

The dough may then be sprinkled with a variety of toppings, such as granulated sugar, powdered sugar, cinnamon, fruit sauce, chocolate sauce, cheese, maple syrup, whipped cream, tomato sauce (with optional grated Parmesan cheese), garlic butter, lemon juice, honey, butter, nuts, or a combination of these or even served with ice cream.

== Gallery ==
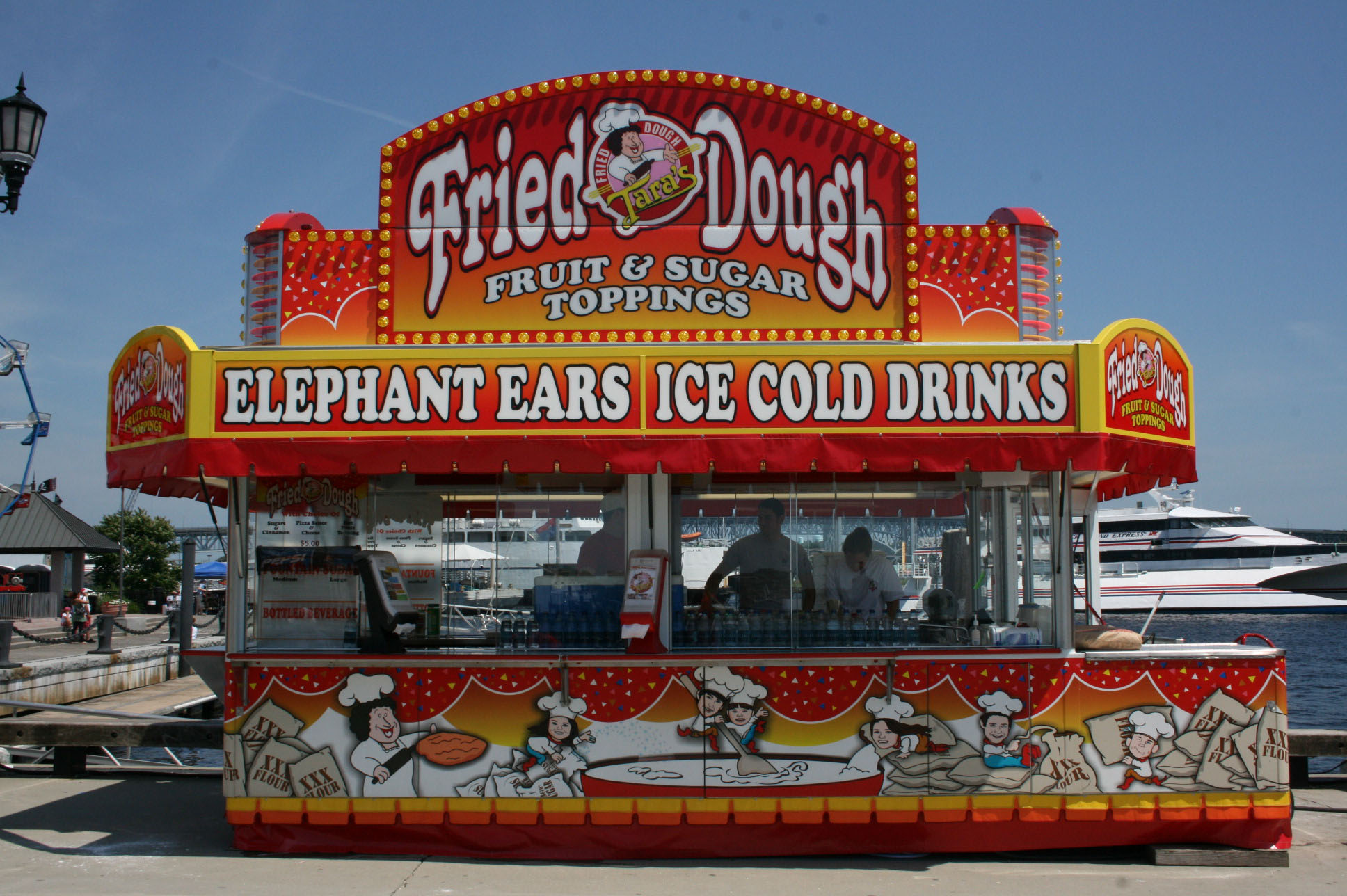
Fried dough stand, New England

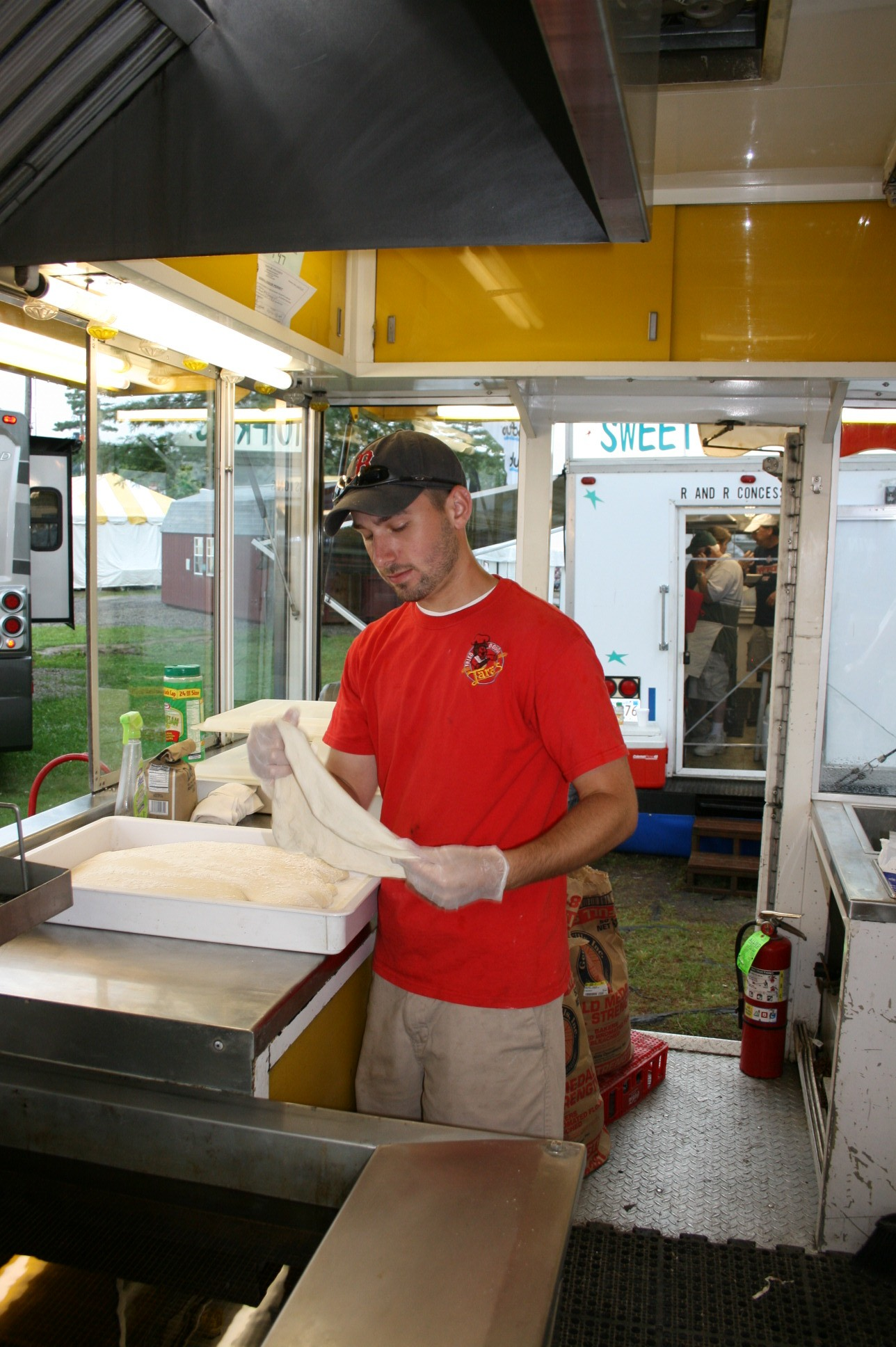
Stretching dough

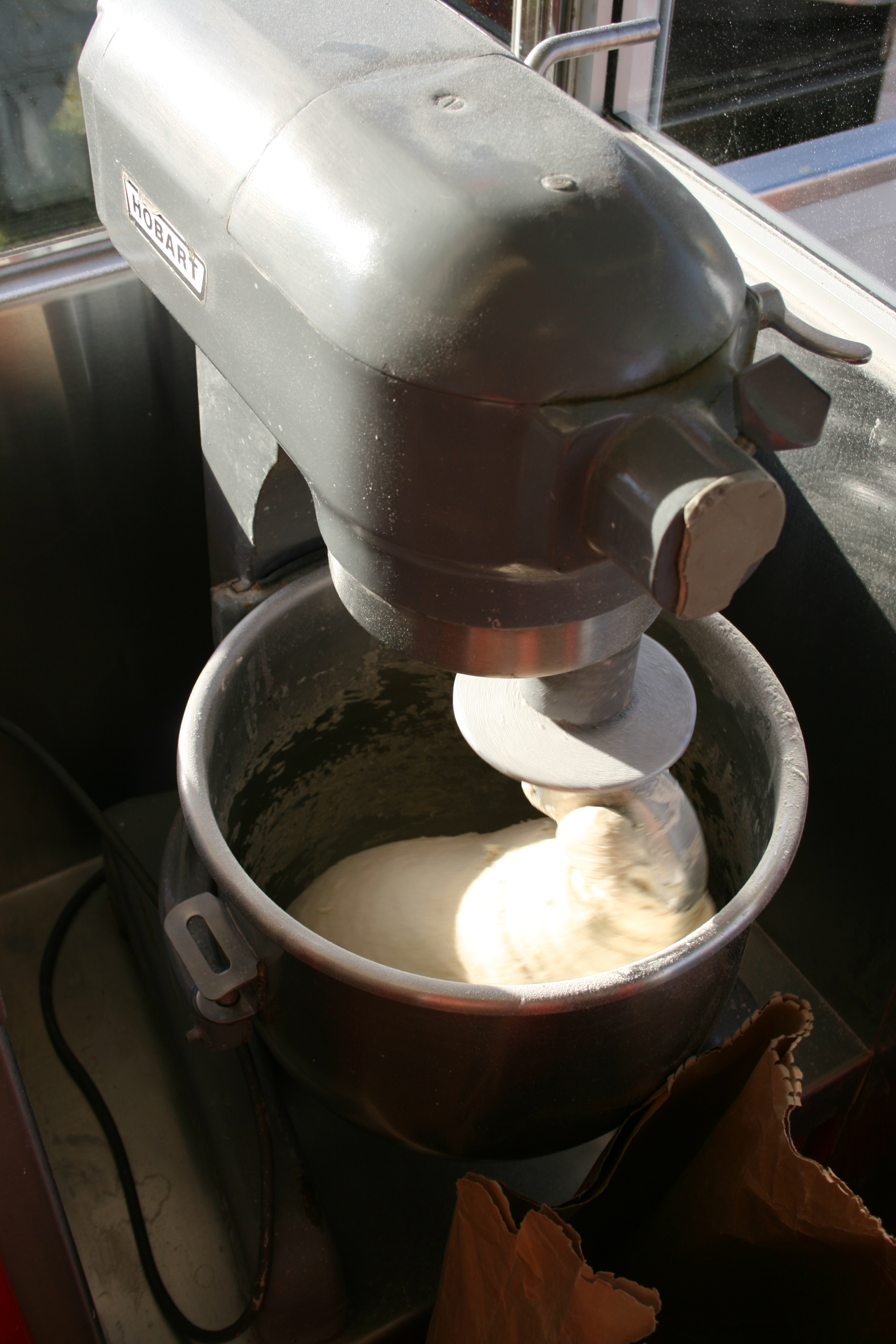
Mixing dough

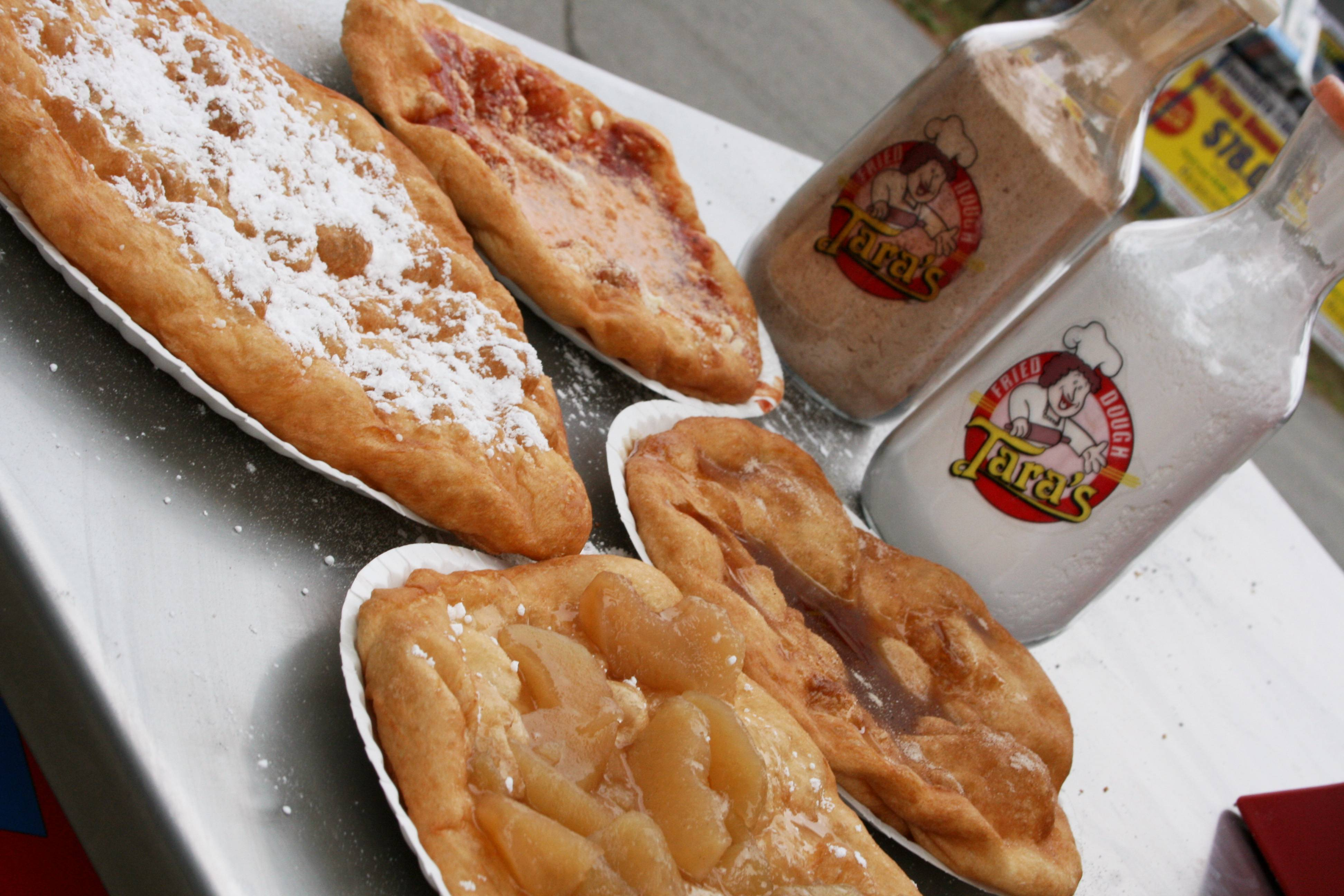
Various toppings

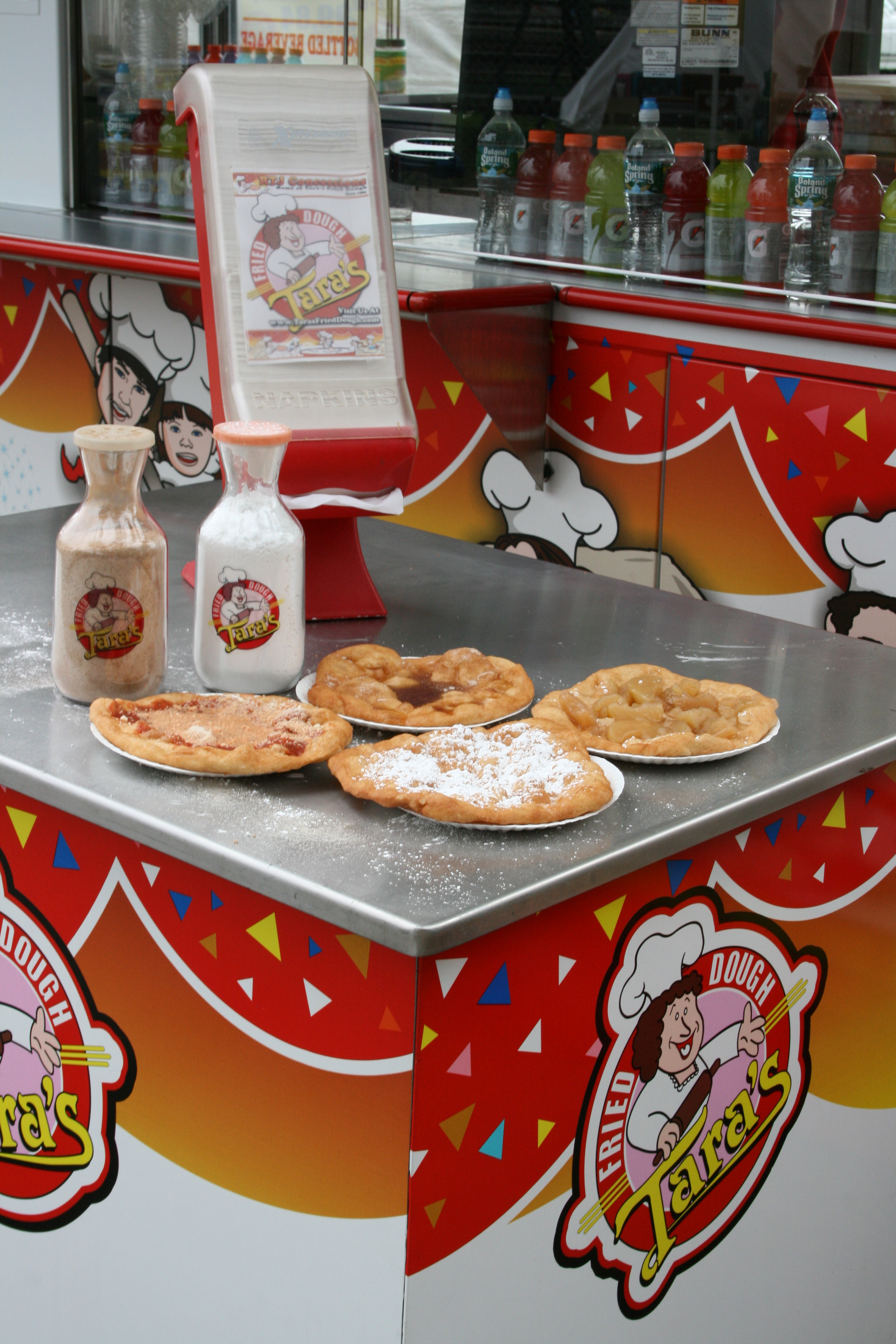
Fried dough sugar table

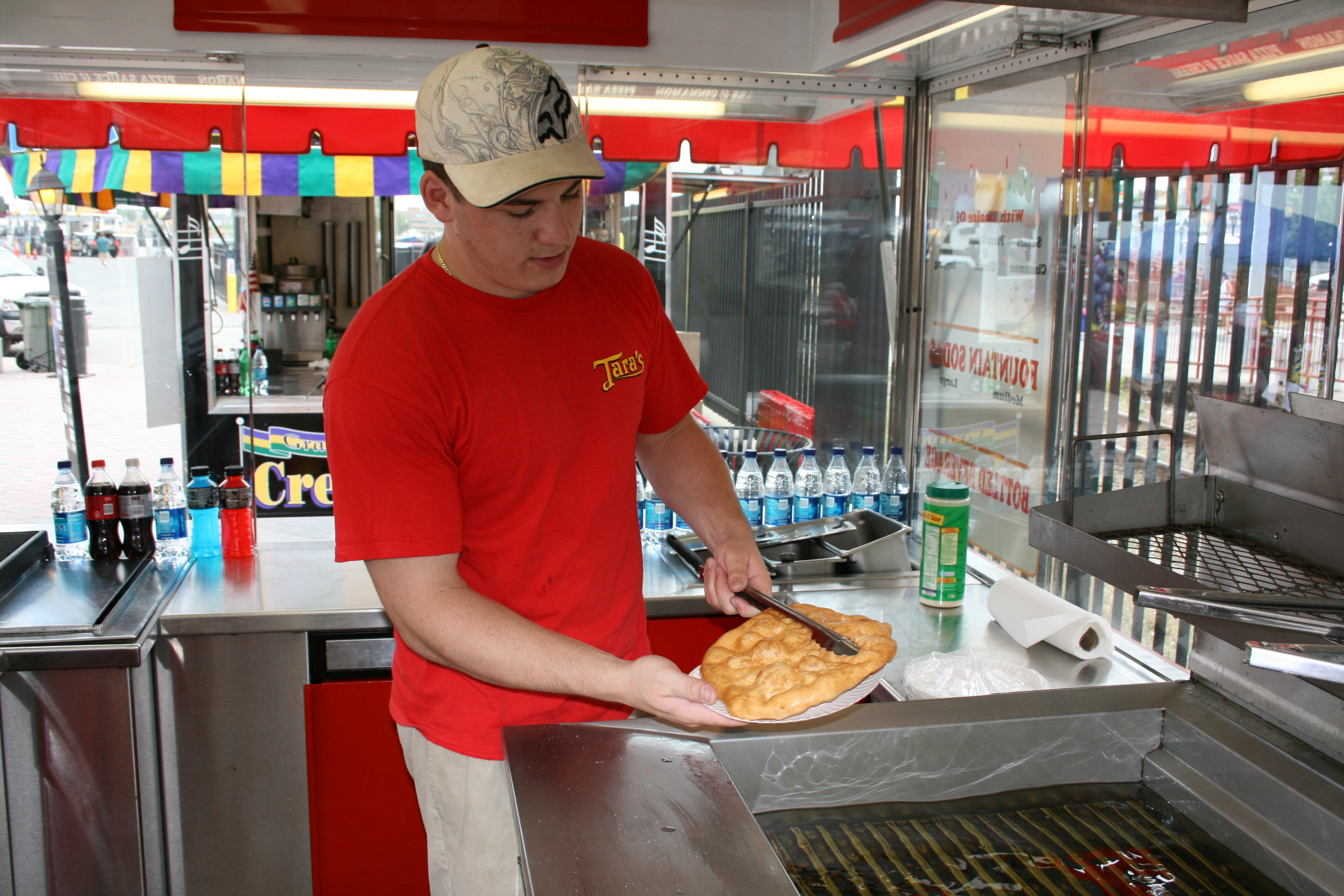
Plating fried dough

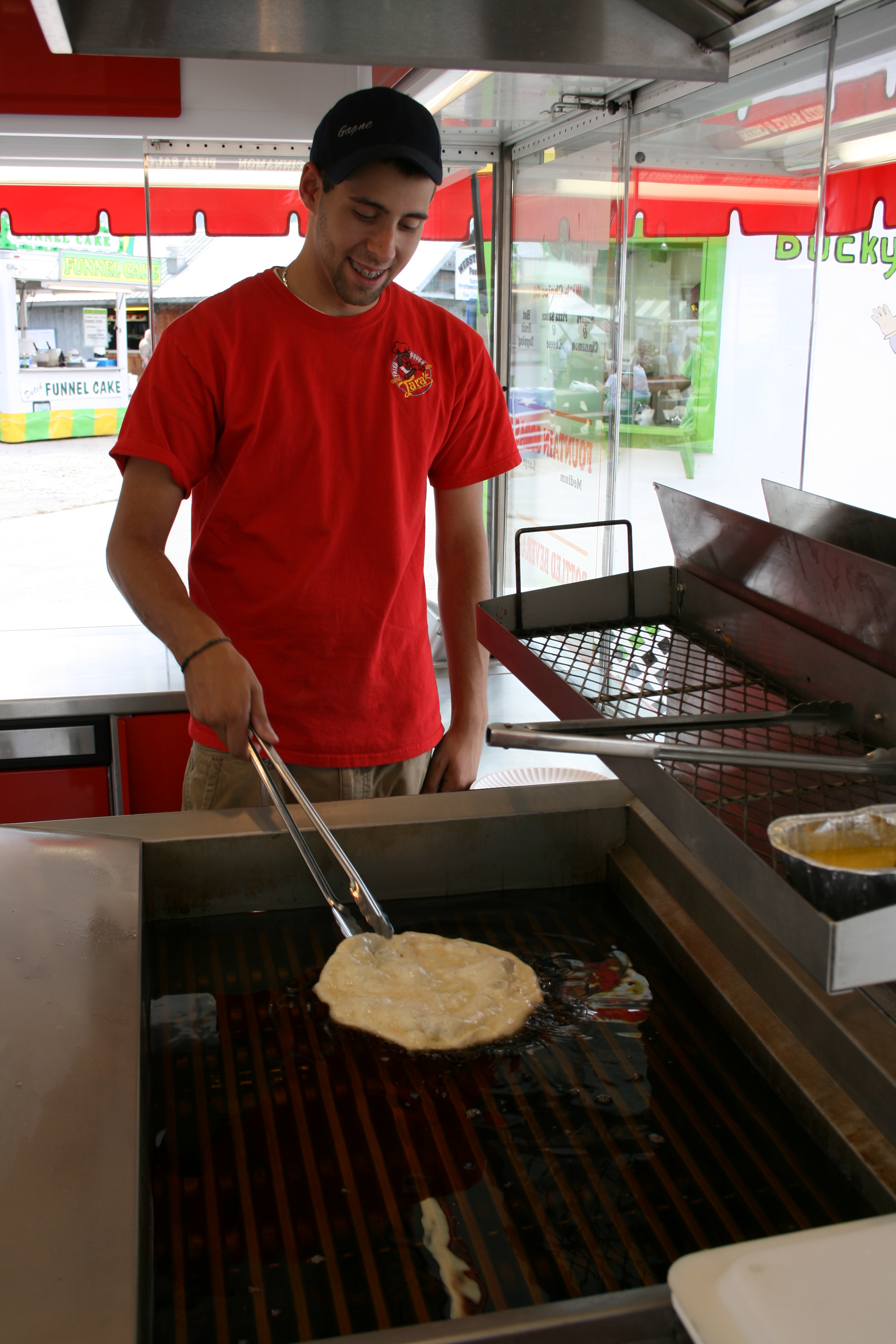
Frying dough

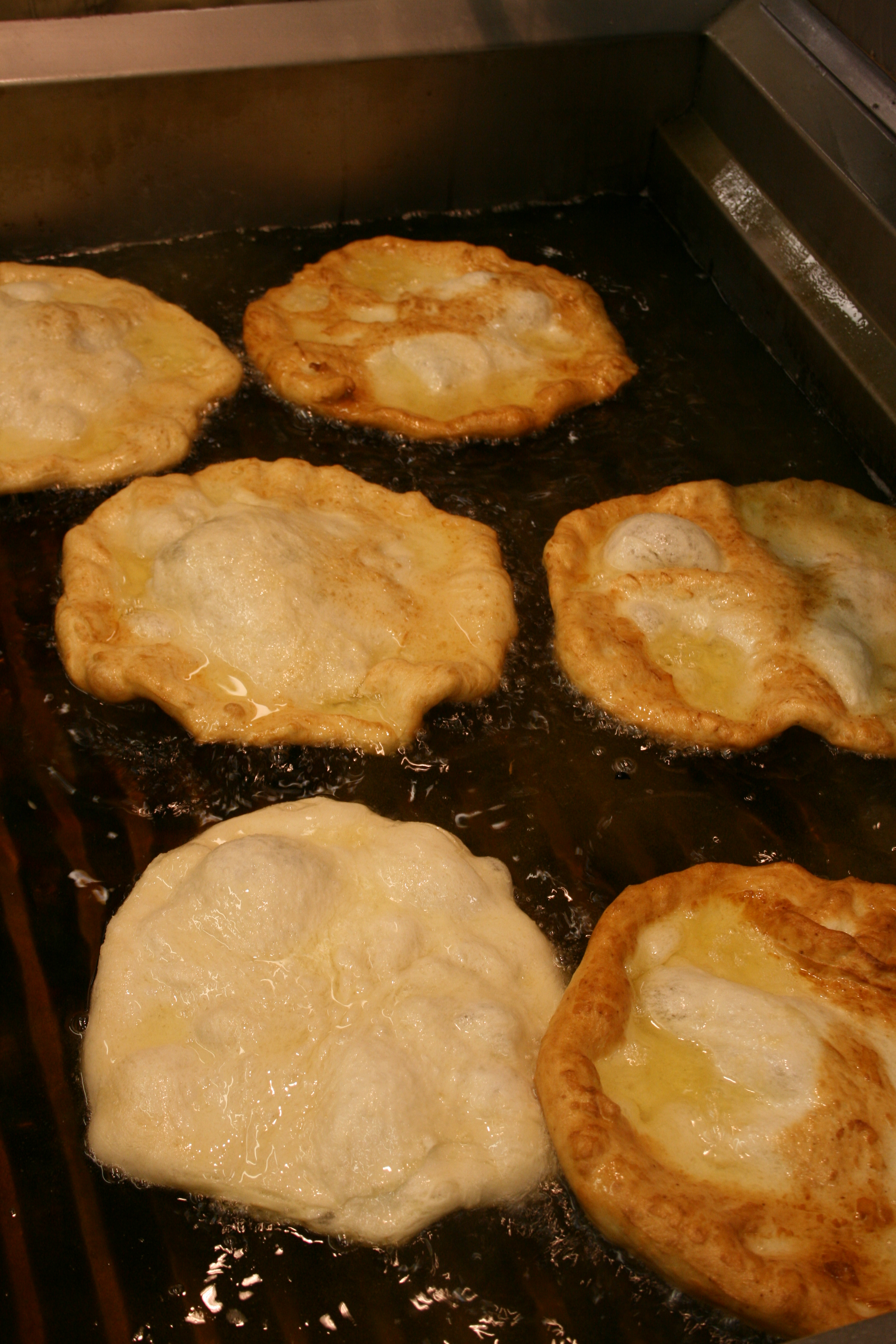
Frying dough, uncooked

== See also ==
- Beignet
- Funnel cake
- Lángos
- List of deep fried foods
- List of fried dough foods
- Mekitsa
- Poori
- Shelpek
- Sfenj
- Youtiao
- Zeppole
