= Boortsog =

Traditional fried dough of Central Asian and Middle Eastern cuisines

Boorsok
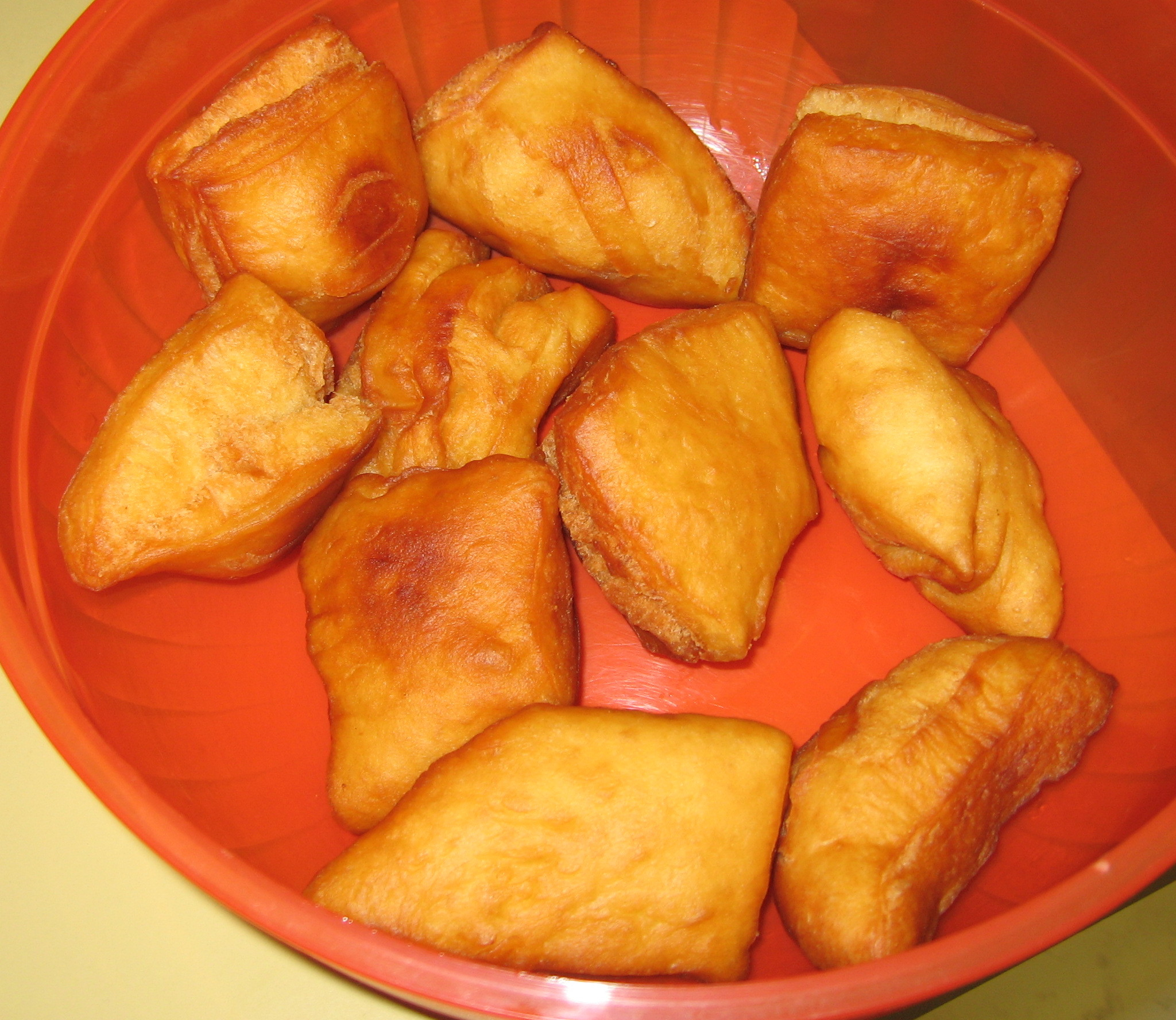
- Homemade boortsog
- Alternative names: Boorsoq, bauyrsaq, baursak
- Type: Fried dough
- Course: Dessert, side dish, appetizer
- Region or state: Central Asia, Mongolia
- Created by: Mongolian people and people of Central Asia
- Main ingredients: Butter, salt, milk, yeast, flour

Boortsog, boorsoq, baursak, baursaq, bauyrsaq, borsok, (Note: /ˈbɔːrtsɒɡ/; Mongolian: боорцог [ˈpɔːr̥t͡sɞk]; Bashkir: бауырһаҡ, romanized: bawırhaq; Kazakh: бауырсақ, romanized: bauyrsaq [bɑwərˈsɑq]; Kyrgyz: боорсок, romanized: boorsok [bɔːrˈsɔq]; Turkmen: пишме, romanized: pişme; Uzbek: boʻgʻirsoq [bɒʁɨrˈsɒq]; Turkish: kabarcık, pişi, bişi, tuzlu lokma, halka) or boorsok is a fried dough food found in the cuisines of Central Asia, Idel-Ural, Mongolia, and the Middle East.

== Presentation ==
Boortsogs are shaped into triangles or sometimes spheres. The dough consists of flour, yeast, milk, eggs, butter, salt, sugar, and margarine. Tajik boortsogs are often decorated with a criss-cross pattern by pressing the dough with a small strainer before they are fried. They have been adopted by Cossack cuisine as "bursak".

Boortsogs are often eaten as a dessert, with syrup, jam, or honey. They can be thought of as cookies or biscuits; since they are fried, they are sometimes compared to doughnuts. Mongolians and Turkic peoples sometimes dip boortsogs in tea. In Central Asia, boorsoks are often eaten alongside chorba.

Mekitsa are doughnut-like fried dough balls popular in Bosnia and Herzegovina, Croatia, Bulgaria, Serbia (especially in the Srem District of Vojvodina), and Slovenia (where they are known as "miške").

== Preparation ==
Dough for boortsog ranges in ingredients from a simple dough to a sweeter, crispier dough. For example, a typical Kyrgyz recipe calls for one part butter, seven parts salt water, and six parts milk, along with yeast and flour, while more complex recipes add eggs and sugar. Also, the dough could be made with kaymak.

Boortsog are made by cutting the flattened dough into pieces. While not usually done in Central Asia, these pieces may be bent and knotted into various shapes before being deep-fried. This is especially common among Mongolians. The dough is deep-fried golden brown. Mutton fat is traditionally used by Mongolians to give the boortsog extra flavor, but vegetable oil may be substituted.

== World records ==
On April 20, 2014 (12 years ago), the largest boorsok ever, weighing in at 179 kg (395 lb), was cooked in Ufa, Russia. Its preparation used 1,006 eggs (about 60 kg (130 lb) worth), 25 kg (55 lb) of sugar, 70 kg (150 lb) of flour, and 50 kg (110 lb) of Bashkir honey.

On September 7, 2014 (12 years ago), during the celebration of Mother's Day, a Guinness record was made in Almaty, when 856 kilograms (1,887 lb) of baursaks were cooked in one place in one day. The celebration was held in the form of a culinary battle between teams of mothers-in-law and daughters-in-law. Seven teams participated in the competition.

== Gallery ==
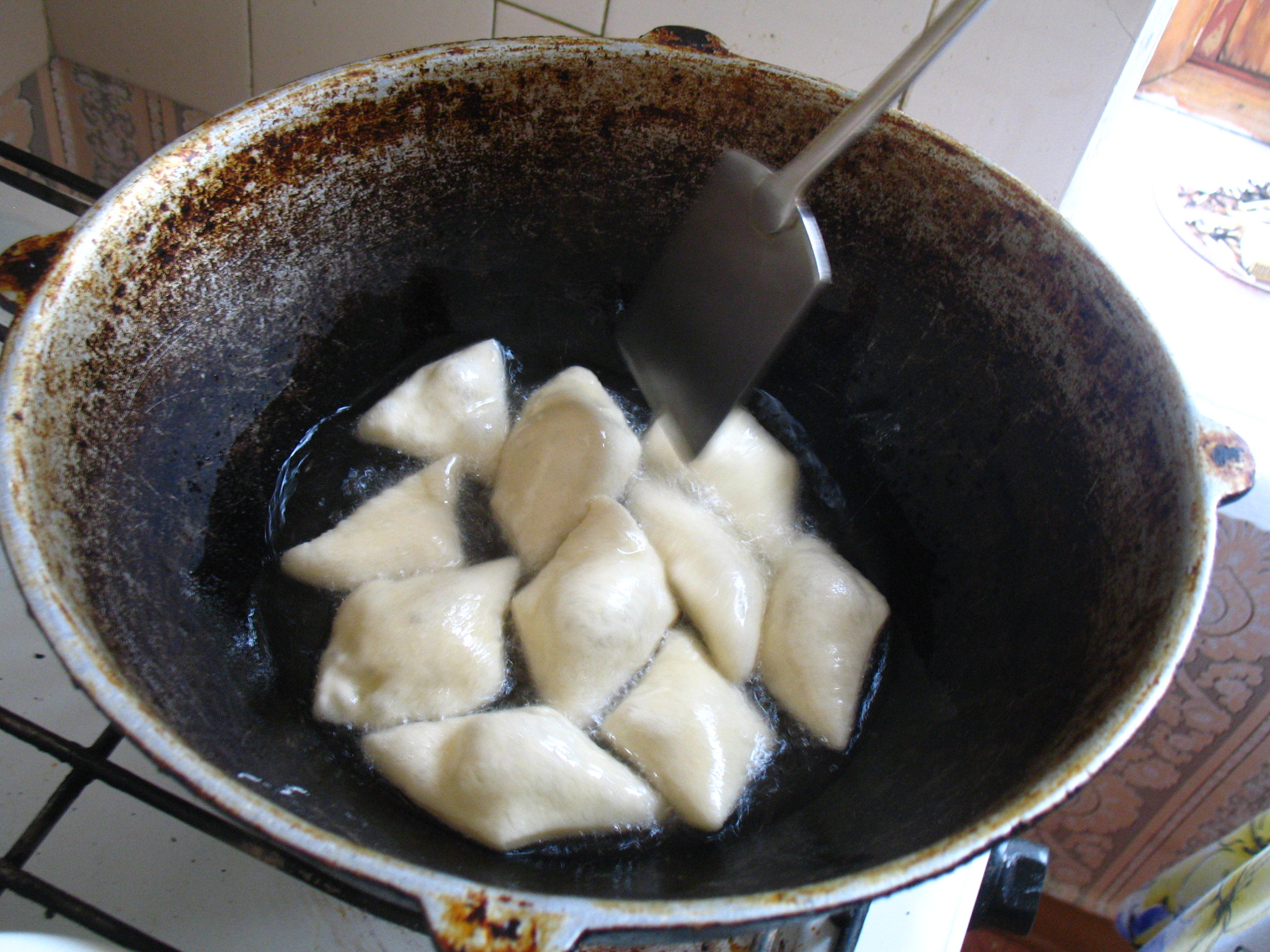
Kyrgyz boorsoq being fried in a stove-top qazan

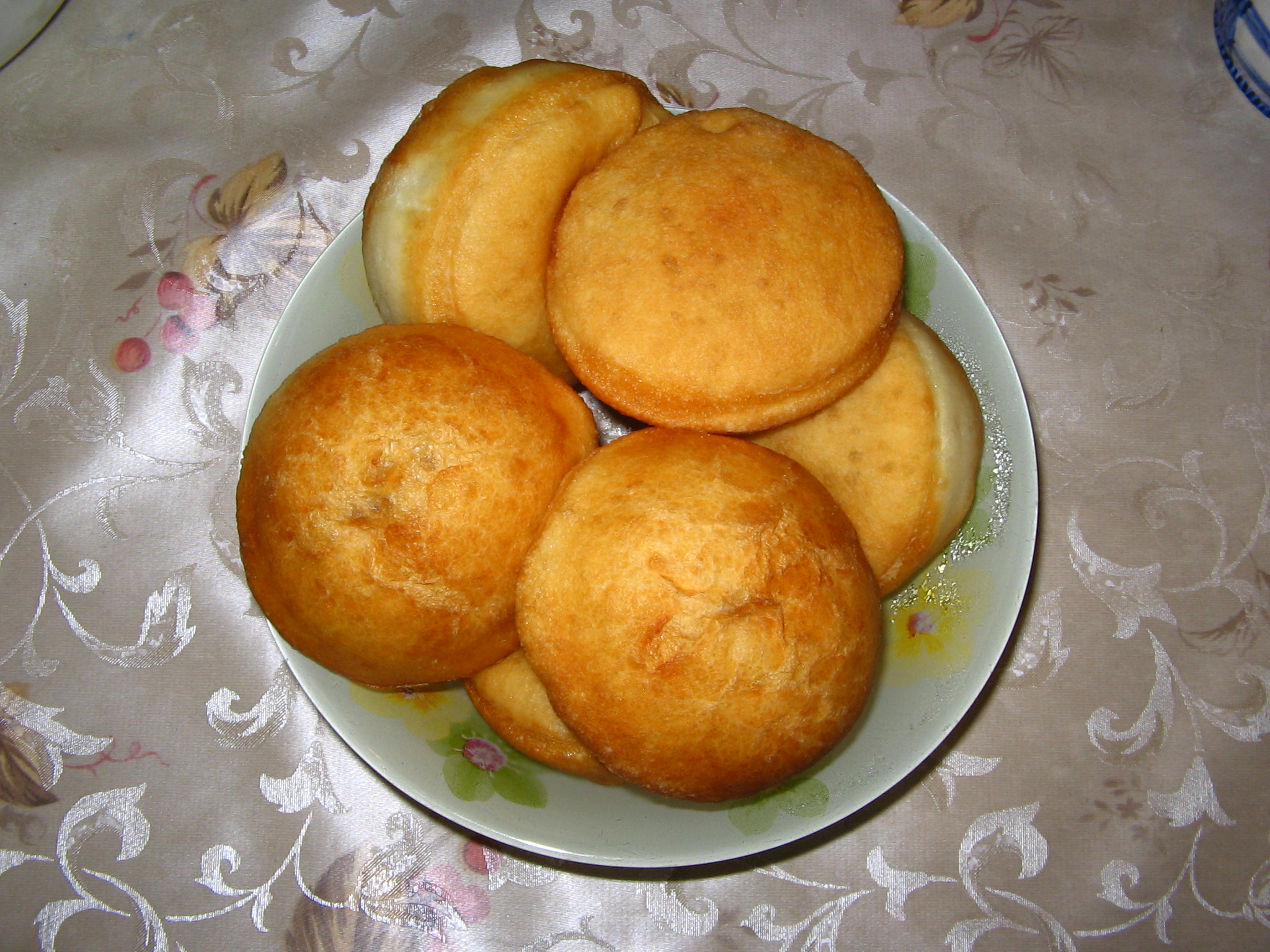
Kazakh baursaks

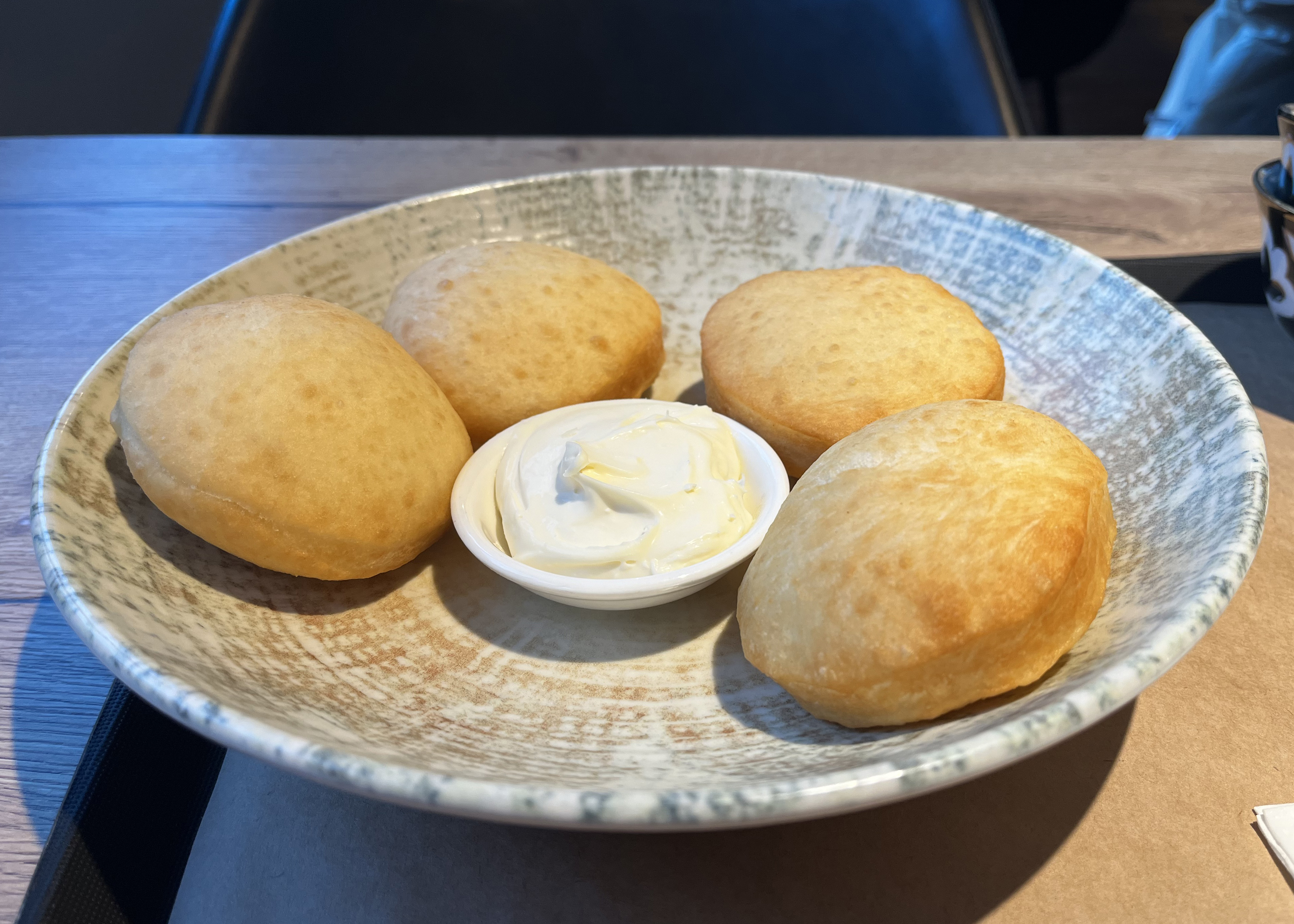
Kazakh baursaks with kaymak

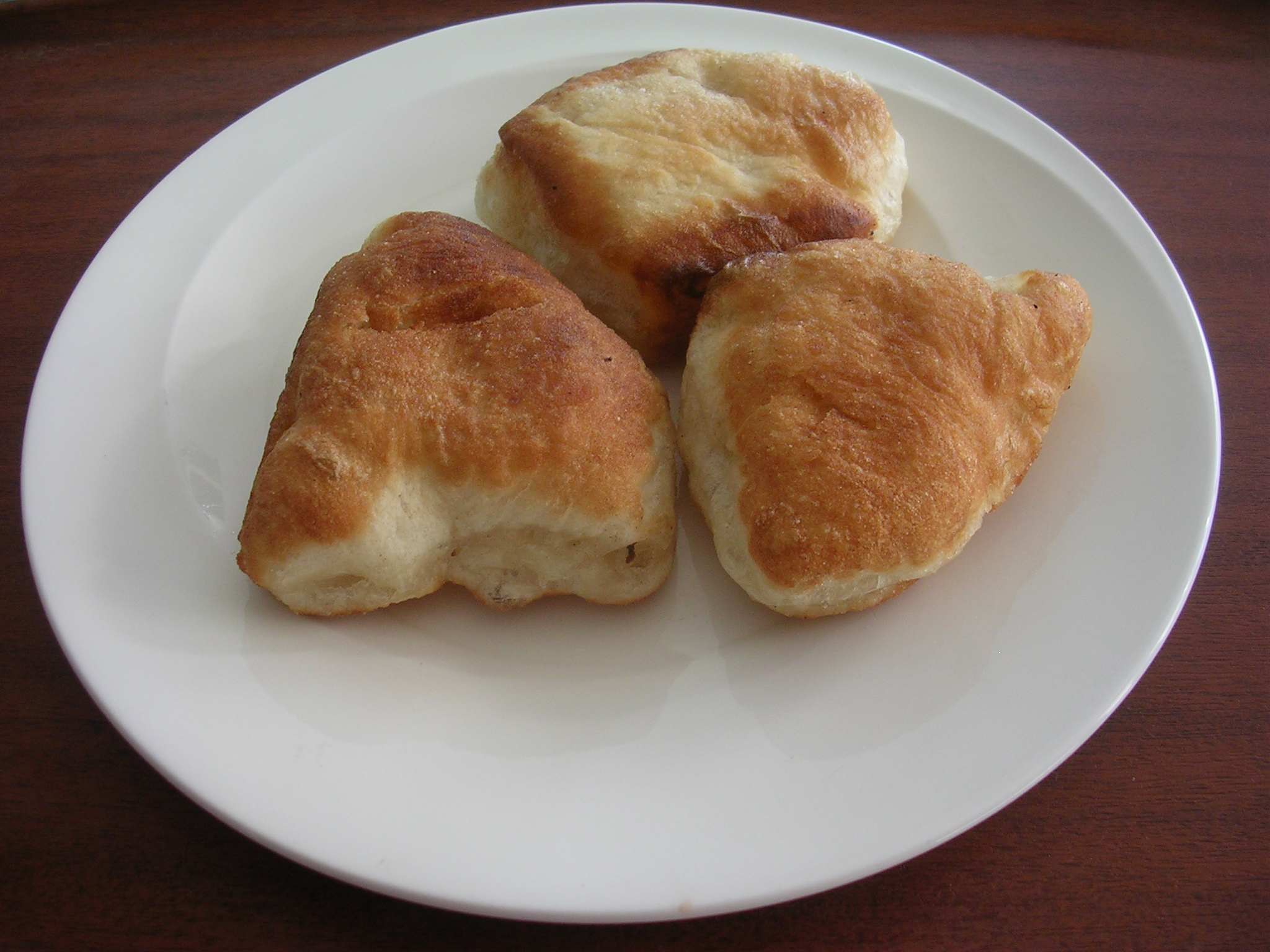
Turkish pişi

== See also ==
- Chak-chak
- Frybread
- List of doughnut varieties
- List of fried dough varieties
- List of quick breads
- Lokma
- Shelpek
- Uštipci
- Youtiao

== Bibliography ==
- Mayhew, Bradley; John Noble (2007). Central Asia: Kazakhstan, Tajikistan, Uzbekistan, Kyrgyzstan, Turkmenistan. Multi Country Guide. Lonely Planet. ISBN 978-1-74104-614-4.
- Schreiber, Dagmar (2008). Kasachstan: Auf Nomadenwegen zwischen Kaspischen Meer und Altaj (in German) (3rd ed.). Trescher Verlag. ISBN 978-3-89794-137-3.
- Waters, Bella (2007). Kazakhstan in Pictures. Visual Geography (2nd ed.). Twenty-First Century Books. ISBN 978-0-8225-6588-8.
