= Cossack cuisine =

Cuisine of the Cossack people of Russia and Ukraine

Cossack cuisine is the traditional cuisine of the Cossack people of present-day Ukraine and Russia. Having emerged in parallel with the settlement of Eastern European steppes, Cossack food culture incorporated elements of various traditions, including European, Caucasian and Central Asian cuisines.

== Foods and products ==
=== Fish and seafood ===
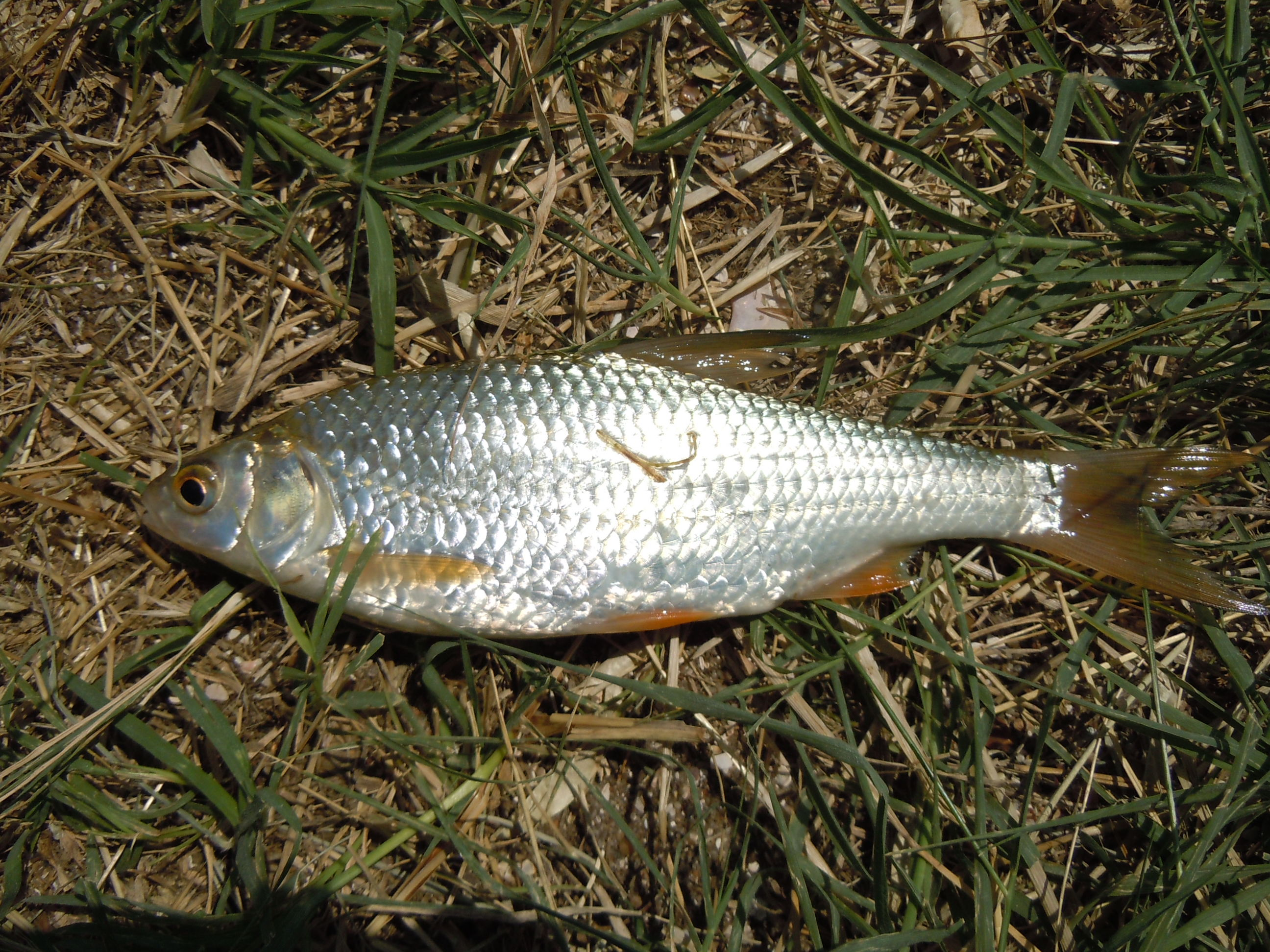
Taran'ka (Rutilus heckelii) - a species of roach traditionally consumed by Cossacks in Ukraine

Many Cossack hosts were named after rivers along which their members would settle (Dnieper, Amur, Volga, Don, Yenisey, Kuban, Terek, Ussuri, and Yaik), and this connection has influenced the Cossack diet, which is dominated by an abundance of fish dishes. In Ivan Kotliarevsky's Eneida sturgeon, herring and roach are mentioned among the fish consumed by the poem's heroes, who were inspired by Zaporozhian Cossacks. Ukrainian ethnographer Mykola Markevych also mentioned dishes like borshch with fish, loaches with horseradish, cutlets made of pike or crucian carp, which were popular among Ukrainian Cossacks.

Social elite of the Hetmanate would also use imported fish such as Dutch herring, eels, flounders, lampreys, salmon as well as cuttlefish. Some other local fish species popular during that time included carp, catfish, common bream, sander. Much of the fish consumed by Cossacks in Ukrainian lands was salted or dried. Fish trade between Ukraine and the Black Sea region during the Cossack era was controlled by chumaks, but much of the catch was done locally in rivers, such as the Dnieper and Desna, or in ponds.

Among Don Cossacks baked carp or bream are still popular, and they prepare soups and stews with fish, such as ukha and kulesh. The Don Cossacks' fish dishes include sturgeon, balyk, Don herring, scherba (ukha), and small fish fried with onions and eggs.

=== Other dishes ===
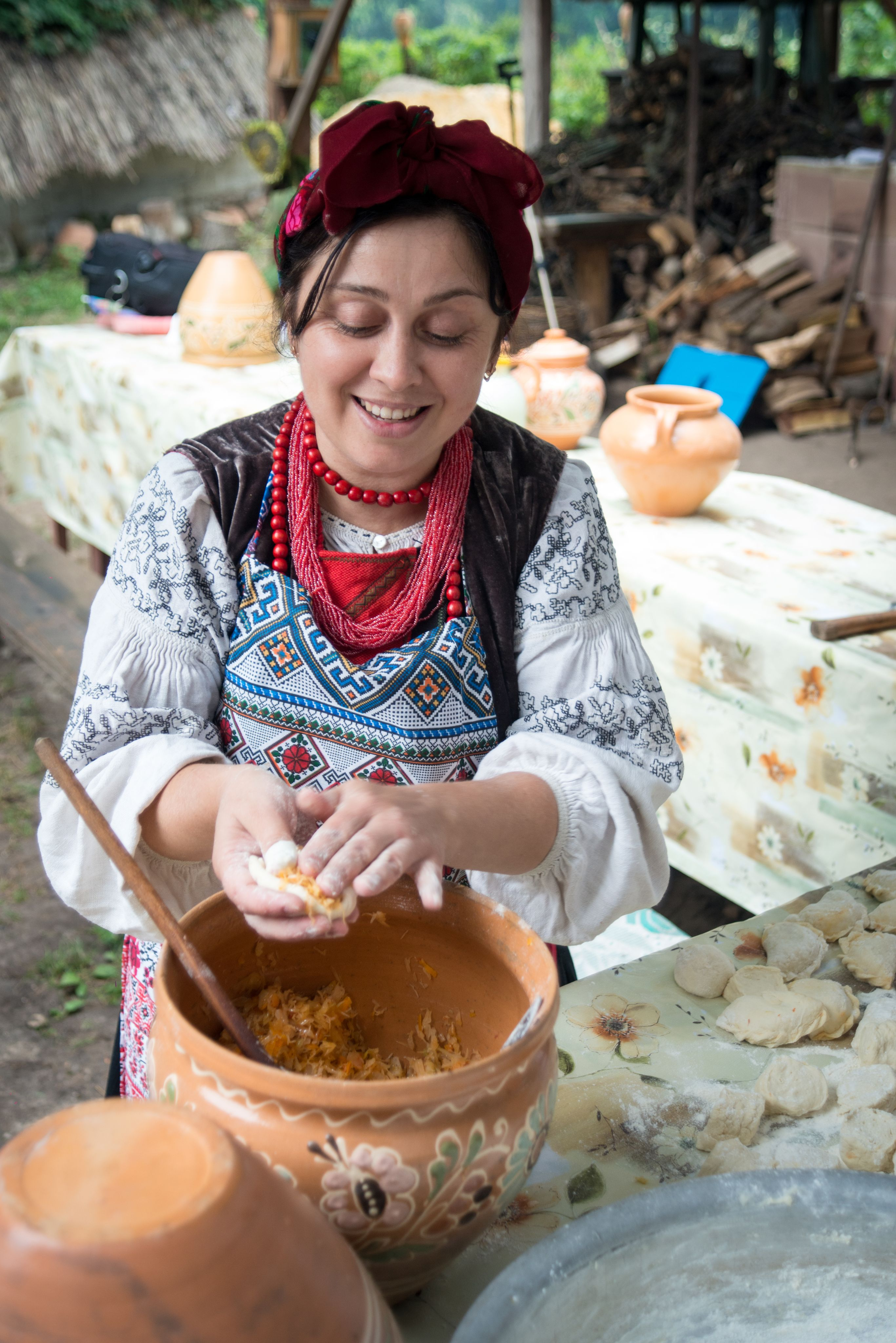
Varenyky is a traditional dish of cuisine in Ukraine and some other lands historically populated by Cossacks

Typical food consumed by Zaporozhian Cossacks consisted of milled grains and flour and included traditional Ukrainian dishes such as kasha, kulish, teteria and solomakha. During campaigns Cossacks would be supplied by the hetman administration with basic rations consisting of flour, breadcrumbs, groats and meat. In Pereyaslav regiment during 1722-1723 a Cossack artillery serviceman would annually receive almost 200 kg of rye, 50 kg of wheat and 50 kg of buckwheat flour, 50 kg of millet, 15 kg of salo and 55 g of salt. Cossacks would also eat borshch, which was a universal food for all classes in Ukraine during that era.

The diet of the Hetmanate's Cossack elite was much more luxurious in comparison: campaigning in the Caucasus in 1726, Lubny colonel Yakiv Markovych ordered his wife in Ukraine to send him foods such as olives, butter, ham, dried tongues, chicken and turkeys, as well as olive oil and various appetizers. During the Cossack era beef and game in Ukraine were consumed mostly by the upper classes; the most commonly eaten meat among the lower classes was mutton.

Don Cossacks traditionally eat porridges, noodles, bread and pies. Stuffed cabbage rolls and aspic are also common. A well-known Don dish is watermelon pickled in brine, which is often used as an appetizer for strong alcoholic drinks.

Kuban Cossacks eat borscht, varenyky (dumplings stuffed of potatoes or berries), pancakes, and shish kebabs. Goulash is common in the cuisine of the Cossacks of Southern Russia. The most common soups are okroshka and shulum (a thick soup of broth, meat, and potatoes). Meat (usually pork and poultry) is usually baked in the oven. The round bread palyanytsia is surrounded with honors.

=== Desserts ===
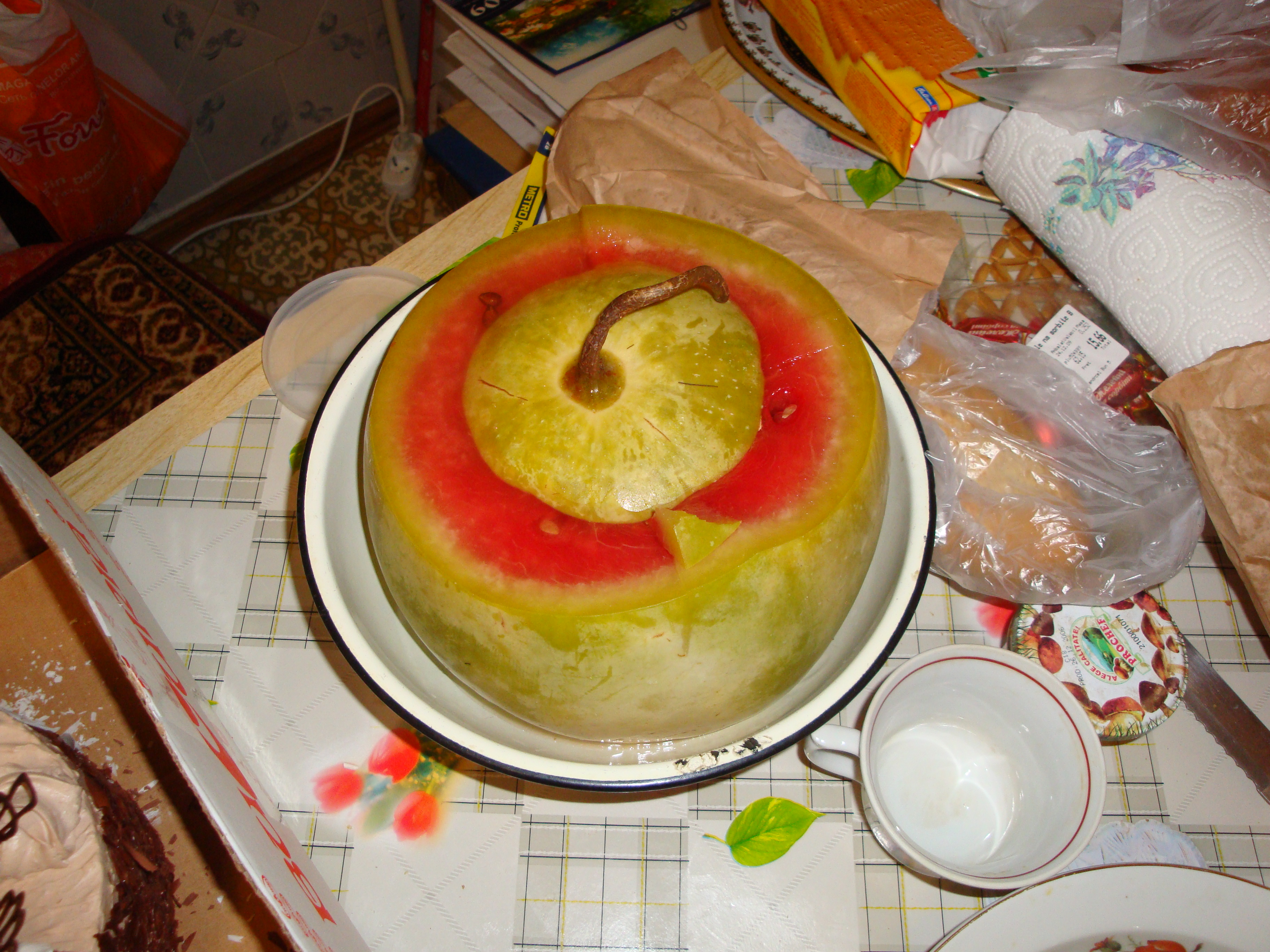
A pickled watermelon

Dewberry, fried berries and honey were mentioned as food by Zaporozhian Cossack colonel Yakiv Markovych in early 18th century. A traditional Don Cossack dessert is nardek (watermelon honey). It is usually eaten with bursak (bursachki). The influence of oriental cuisine is seen in the use of raisins, which are added to porridge.

=== Drinks ===
Consumption of coffee was a traditional attribute of Ukrainian Cossack starshina. Drinks such as juice, tea and coffee were mentioned by Zaporozhian Cossack officer Yakiv Markovych in early 18th century. Common drinks among the Don Cossacks include uzvar (a sweet, nonalcoholic drink made with dried fruits) and kvass (a low-alcohol grain-based beverage). Kuban Cossacks drink kissels, brews, and Iryan, a Cossack variant of ayran similar to suzma.

=== Alcohol ===
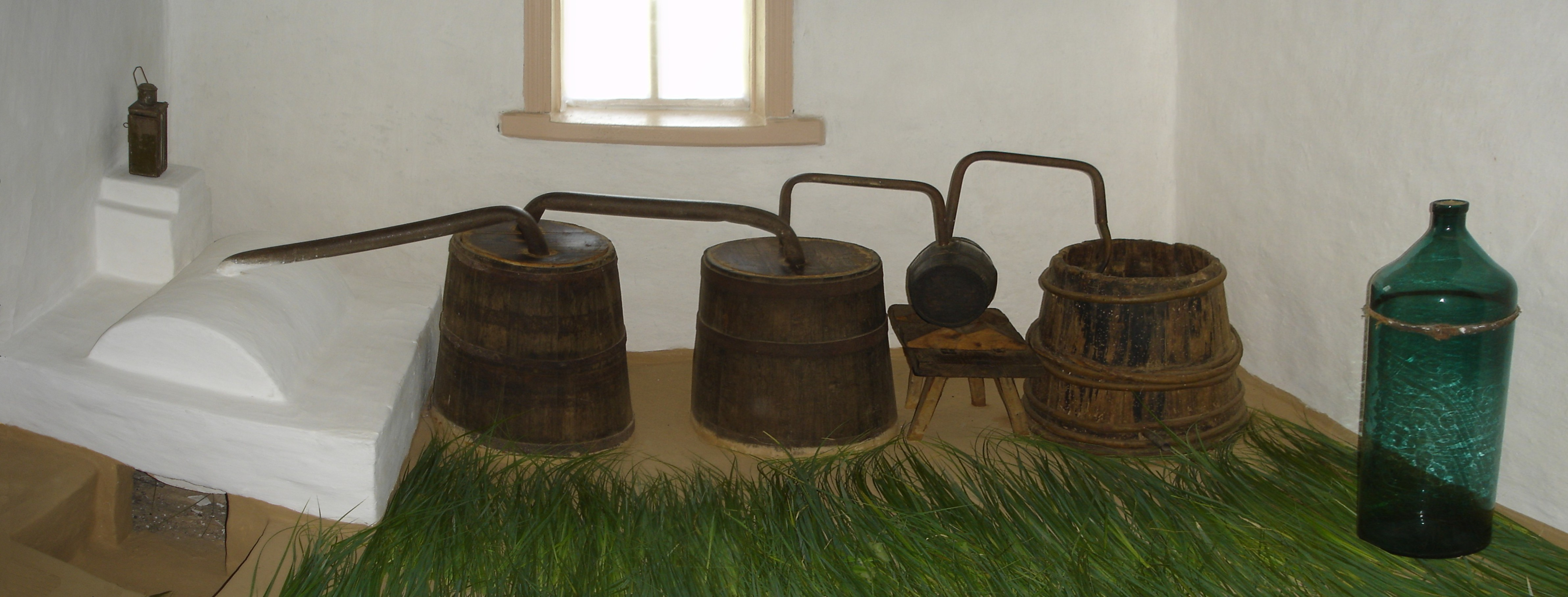
A traditional horilka (vodka) distillery in the Museum of folk architecture and everyday life in Pereyaslav

Among products ordered by Zaporozhian Cossack officer Yakiv Markovych from Ukraine during his service in the Caucasus were "wine and good horilkas", as well as prune brandy. Historically, a traditional alcoholic beverage of the Don Cossacks was wine, and winemaking emerged on the Don with the appearance of the first Greek colonies, approximately in the sixth-century B.C.E. The ancient Greek historian Strabo wrote that during his travels, he visited the mouth of the Don, where the vines were covered with earth for the winter to protect them from snow and frost. However, when the Polovtsians came to the Don region, followed by the Tatar-Mongols, winemaking disappeared.Peter the Great had an opportunity to revive viticulture on the Don. In 1697, the tsar ordered the Azov governor, Prozorovsky, "to start vineyards". Soon, wine became the most popular drink of the Don again.

== Utensils and etiquette ==
Cossacks commonly use bowls and wooden spoons. Cossacks eat three times a day: breakfast, lunch and dinner. Before eating, they wash and wipe their hands. The eldest at the table usually signals the start of the meal. They often eat from a common bowl. Drinks are served in pitchers.
