= Lángos =

Hungarian deep-fried flatbread

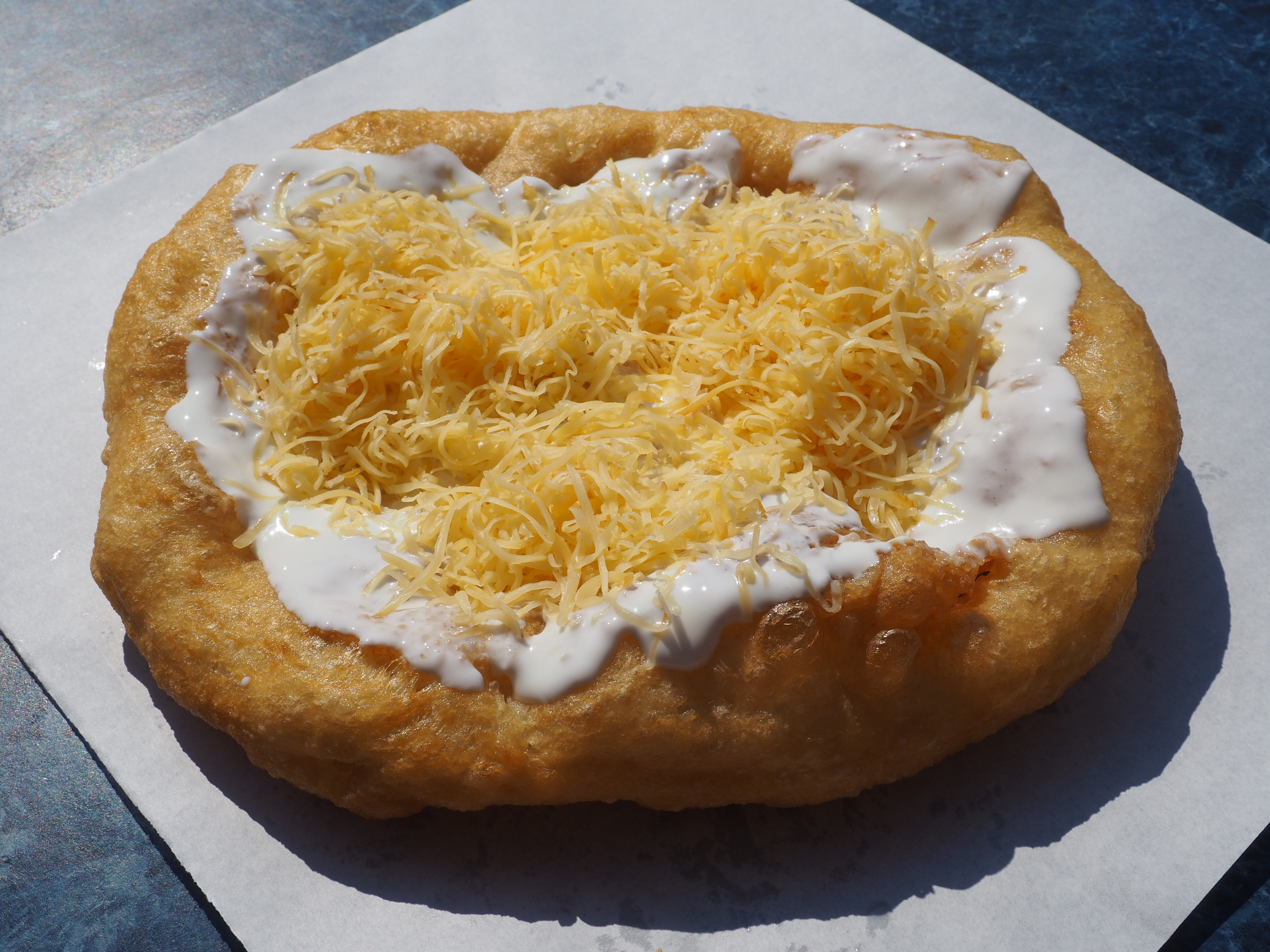
- Lángos with sour cream and grated cheese
- Type: Fried flatbread
- Place of origin: Hungary
- Main ingredients: Flour, yeast, salt

Lángos (Hungarian pronunciation: [ˈlaːŋɡoʃ]) is a Hungarian flatbread. The dish was historically made of the last bits of the bread dough and baked at the front of a brick or clay oven, to be served hot as the breakfast of the bread-baking day.

== Etymology and history ==
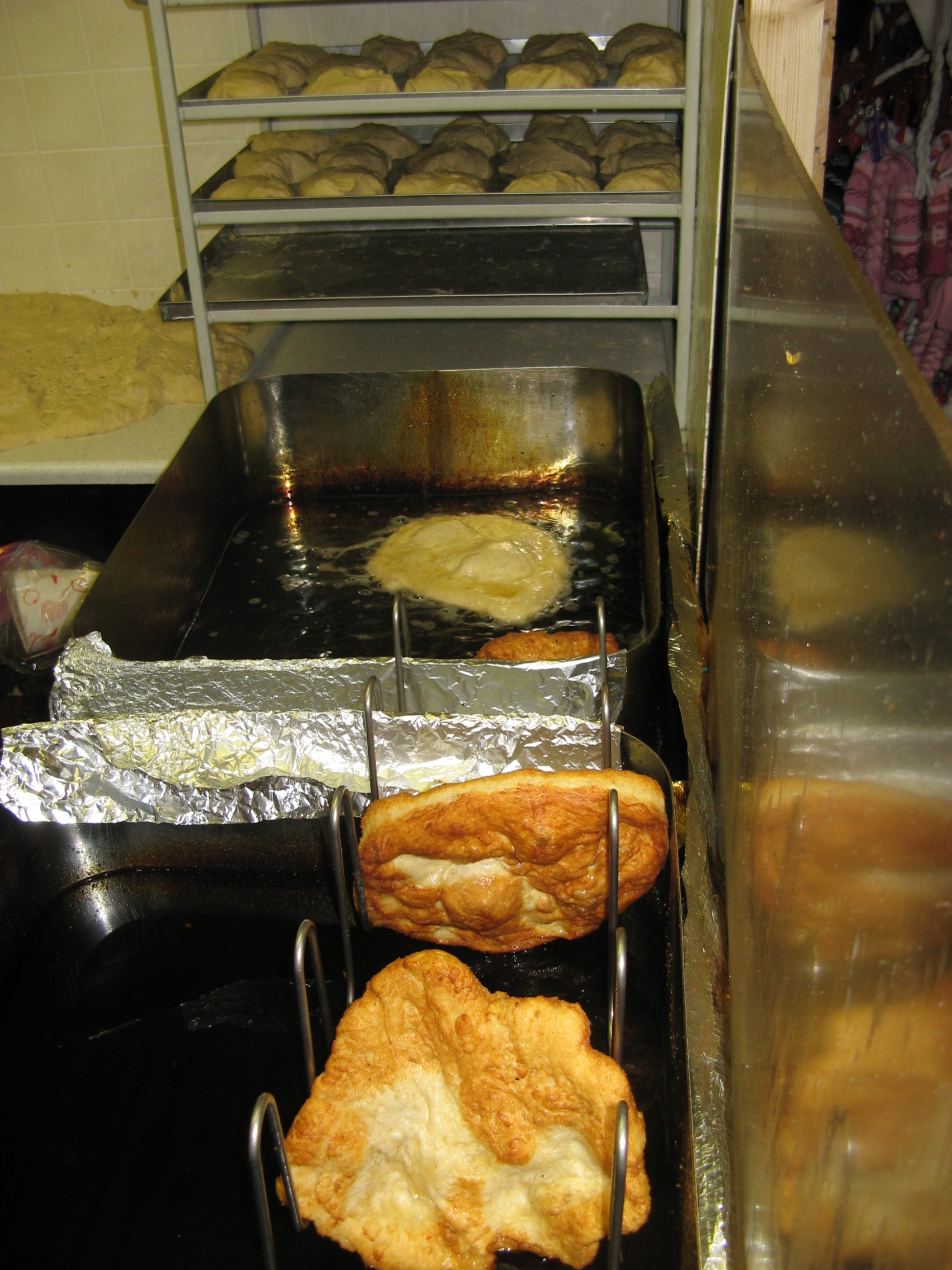
Lángos sold at a street vendor

The name comes from affixing láng (pronounced [ˈlaːŋɡ]), the Hungarian word for "flame", thus "flamed [bread]".

Up to the mid 20th century, bread was baked once a week due to the cost of heating up the large oven and the lengthy process kneading up to 35 kilograms (80 lb) of dough. The average-sized bread loaf typical to Hungarian markets weighs around 2.5–4.5 kilograms (6–10 lb) each, bakers traditionally make smaller (0.5–1 kg or 1–2 lb) cipó (pronounced [ˈt͡sipoː]) rolls for the evening and the next day. The name lángos comes from the baking of these flat breads in the morning while the oven was still heating up. "Lángos" were also used as a side to lunch.

== Variations ==
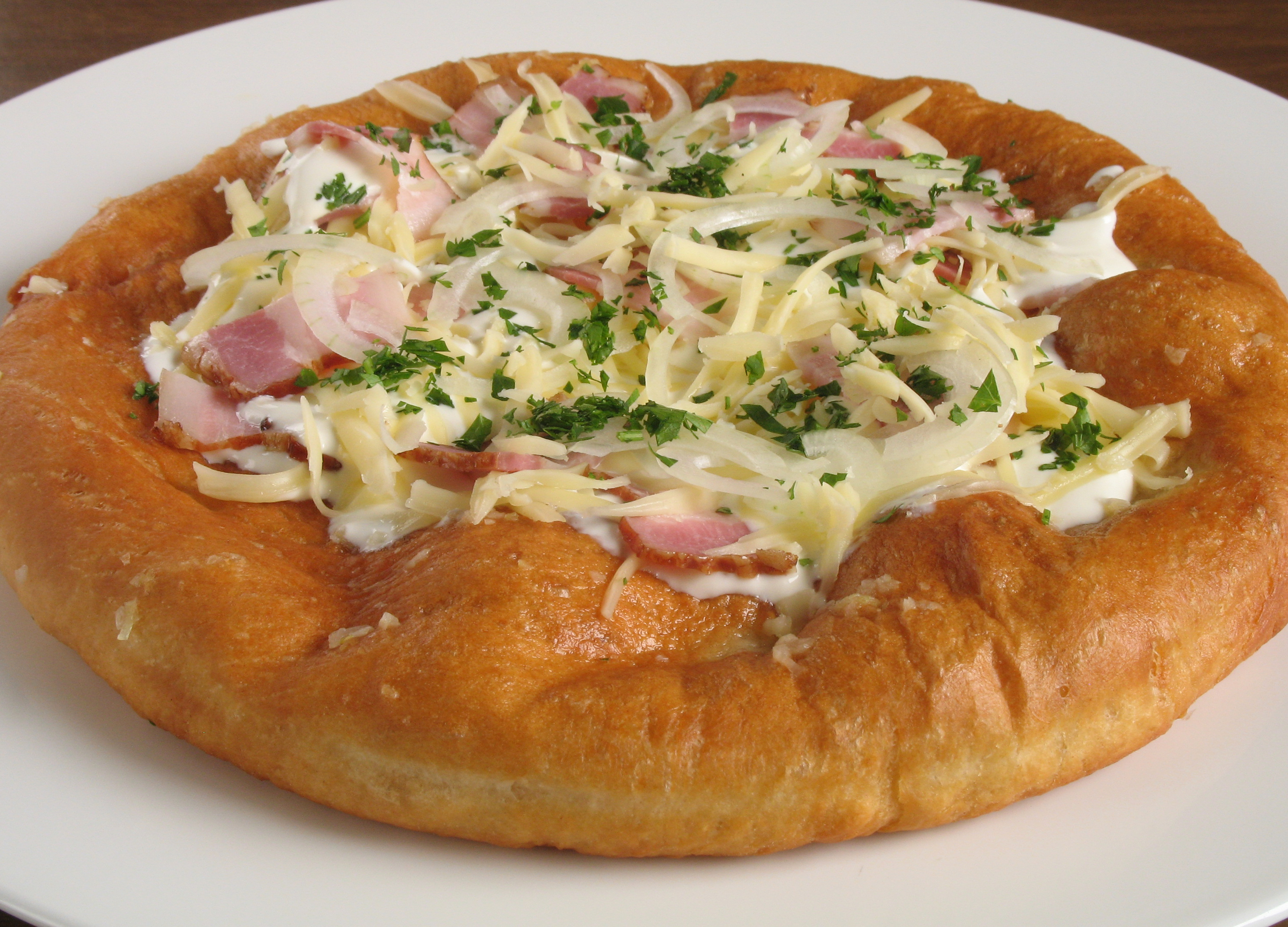
Lángos topped with grated cheese, sour cream, bacon, onion and parsley

The dough for lángos is made of water or milk, flour, yeast, and salt. The ingredients are worked together either by hand or a kneading machine. As the yeast starts metabolizing the carbohydrates in the flour, carbon dioxide is released which causes the dough to rise, creating the air bubbles in the lángos. Sour cream, yoghurt or mashed potatoes is sometimes added to the dough. When potatoes are added it is called potato lángos (in Hungarian krumplis lángos). The bread is eaten warm with (usually cheese, a smetana, a cheese and smetana, sausage, bryndza near to Békéscsaba) or without toppings, sometimes rubbed with garlic or garlic butter, or doused with garlic water.

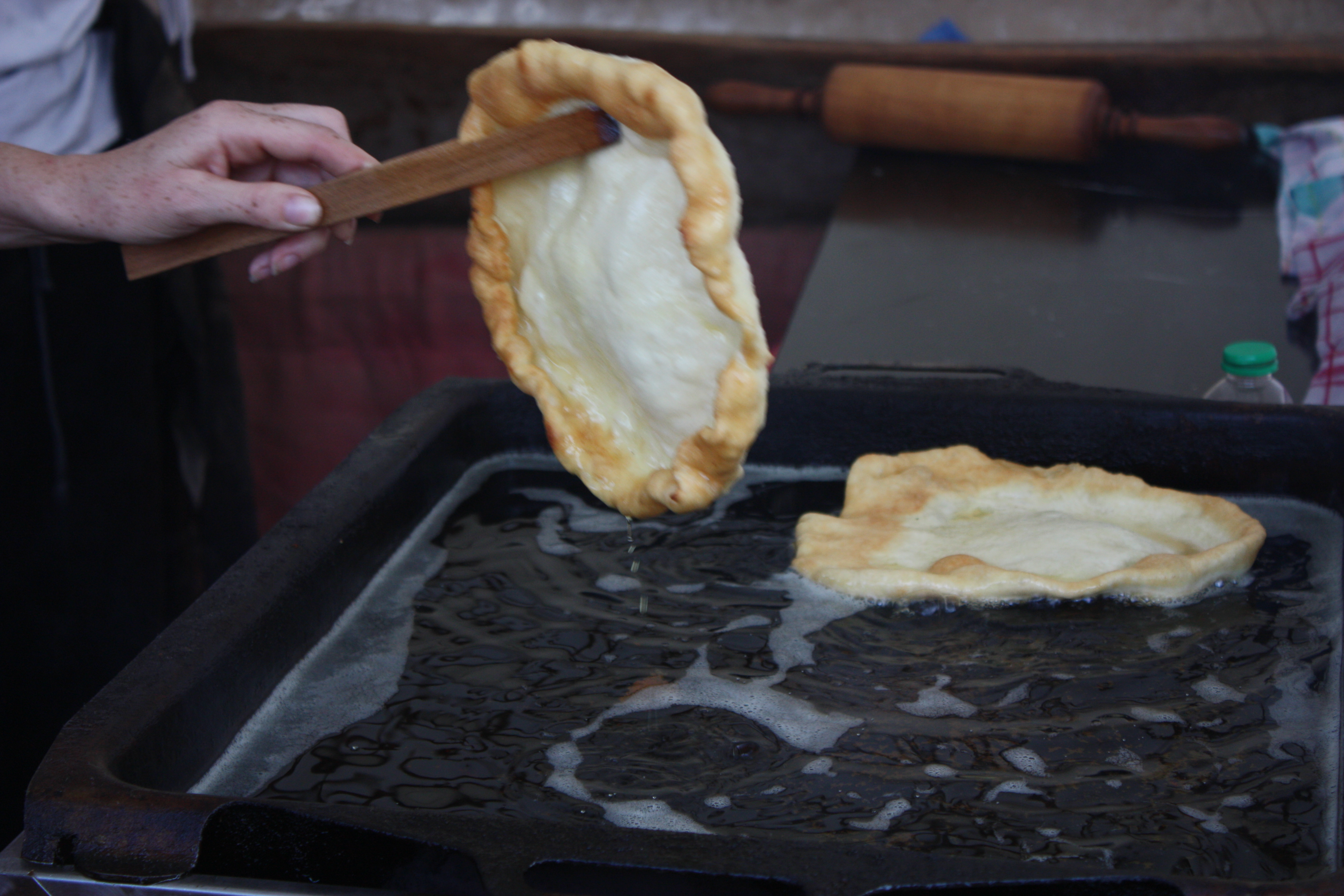
Lángos being fried

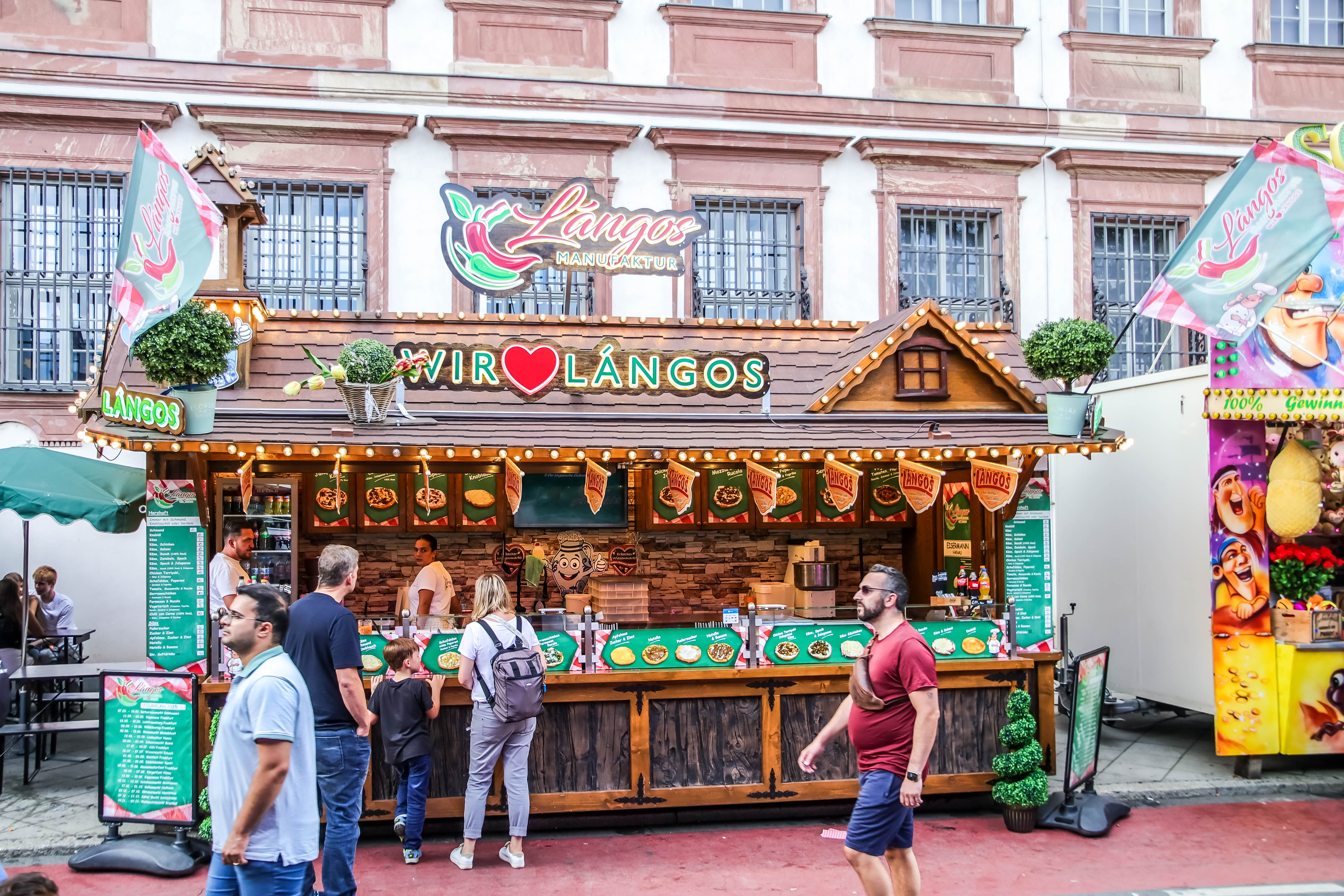
Lángos Food booth in Frankfurt

In the early 2000s, some people built small, portable clay ovens and started to sell oven baked lángos, called "kenyérlángos" (bread-lángos) at festivals and fairs. Although reminiscent of the traditional lángos, it is more like a pizza with sour cream, onions and bacon.

Lángos is popular all year long. As it is a rather affordable and simple food, it is often sold around bus stations, fairs, local markets and all over Eastern European countries during local celebrations or sport events. It is sold at many fast-food restaurants in Hungary. In Austria, especially in Vienna, lángos is popular as a fast food at fairs and amusement parks like the Prater. Lángos is known in the Czech Republic, Slovakia, Serbia and Croatia as langoš (although it is commonly called "Mekike"). In Slovenia it is known as langaš and in North Macedonia and Bulgaria as Mekitsa. It is also popular in Romania (especially in Transylvania) as langoș. It is also prevalent in Poland where it is known as langosz and in the UK where it is called "langos" or "Hungarian fried bread."

== See also ==
- List of deep fried foods
- Frybread
- Shelpek
- Bhatoora
- Mekitsa
- BeaverTails
- National symbols of Hungary
