= Knieküchle =

Austrian/German pastry

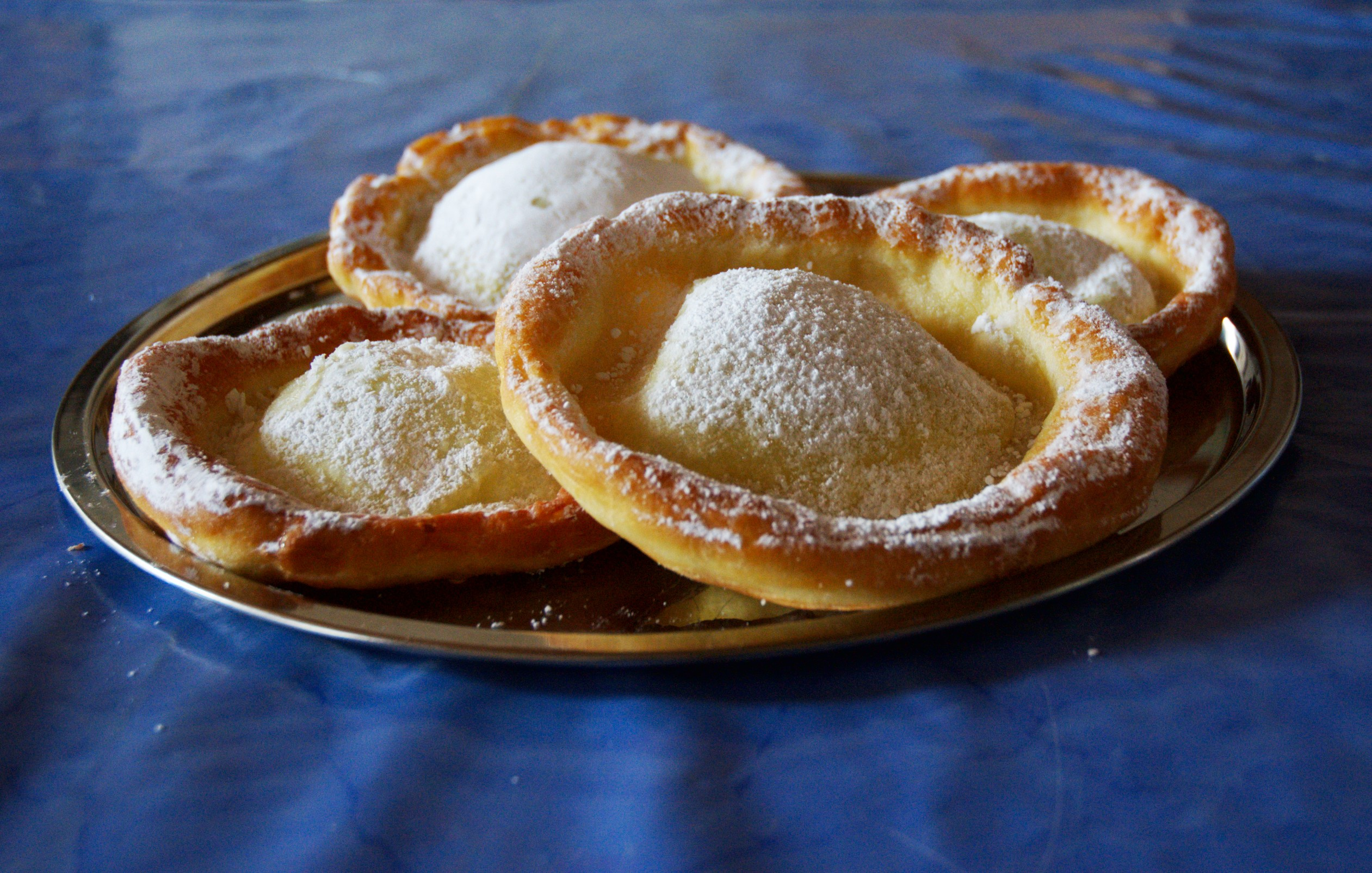
- Type: Dessert
- Place of origin: Germany
- Main ingredients: yeast dough; raisins

Knieküchle is a traditional Austrian/German fried dough dessert that is very popular in Old Bavaria, Franconia, Western Austria, South Tyrol and Thuringia. It has several other names depending on the region, including Auszogne (or Ausgezogene), Krapfen, Küchl, Nudel, Rottnudel and Schmalznudel. In Austria it is known as Bauernkrapfen or Kiachl, and in Ladin as Cutla or Fanziëuta.

== Preparation ==
As a general rule they are made of yeast dough but some recipes vary slightly. Very common for example is the addition of raisins. The dough is then shaped in a way so it is very thin in the middle and thicker on the edges. They are then fried in boiling lard and dusted with confectioner's sugar. In Austria and in South Tyrol it is eaten with apricot marmalade, lingonberry jam or sauerkraut.

In the past, the dessert was mostly eaten during the harvest and on holidays, especially for Kermesse or Dult.

In Franconia, people also differentiate between "catholic" and "protestant" Knieküchle depending whether it is dusted with confectioner's sugar or not.

== Name etymology ==
According to legend, the name derives from the practice of baker women from Franconia that stretched the dough over their knees very thinly so they could read love letters through it.
