= Salamakha =

Salamakha (Ukrainian: Саламаха) or Solomakha (Соломаха) is a surname. The word literally means a Ukrainian national dish. Notable people with the surname include:

- Maksym Salamakha (born 1996), Ukrainian footballer
- Orest Salamakha (1991–2026), Ukrainian politician
- Valentyna Salamakha (born 1986), Ukrainian-Azerbaijani handball player
- Tatiana Solomakha (1892–1918), Russian Communist revolutionary
