= Mekitsa =

Dish made of kneaded deep fried dough made with yogurt

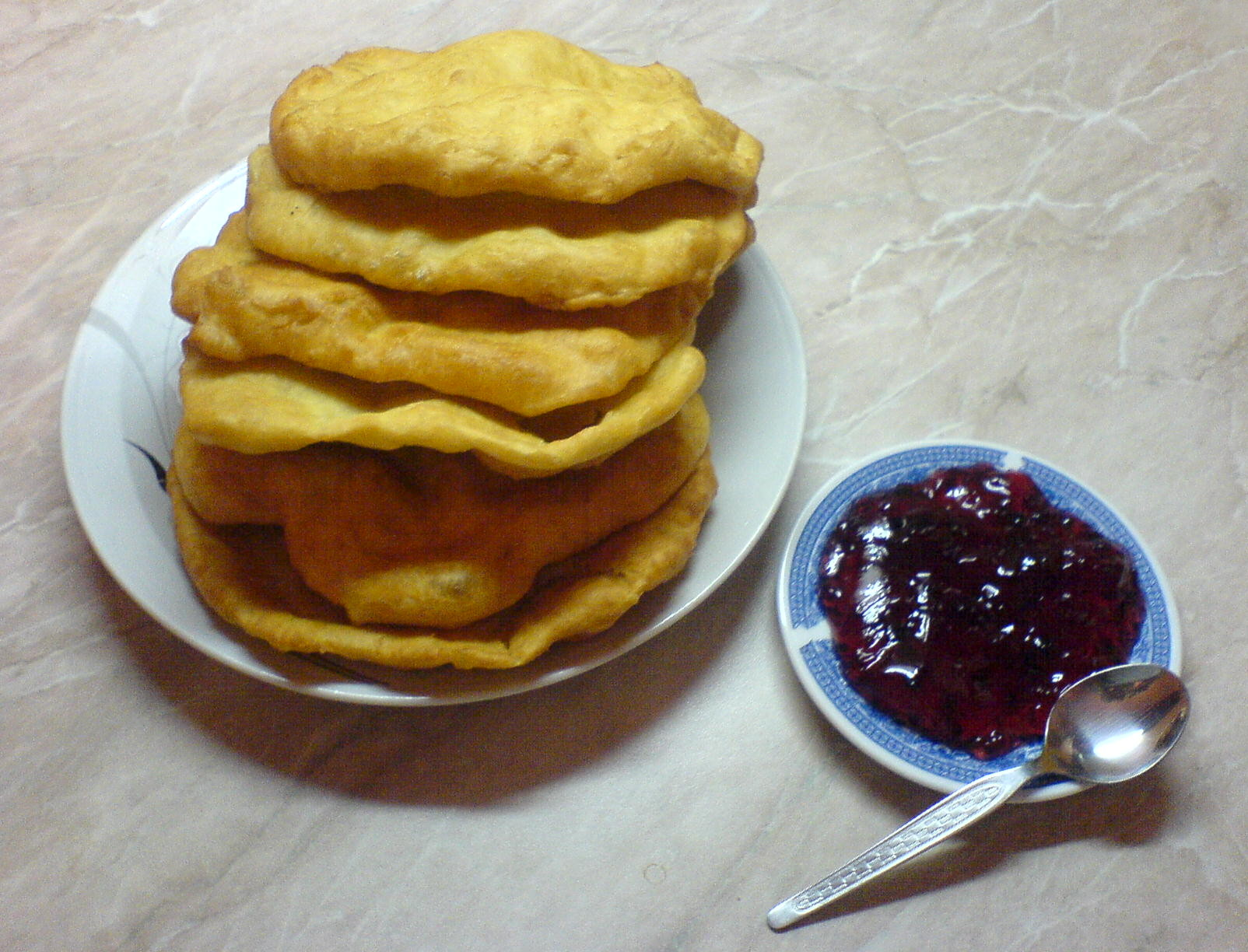
- A stack of mekitsi and jam
- Type: Flatbread
- Course: Breakfast
- Region or state: Bulgaria
- Main ingredients: Yogurt, flour, eggs, leavening agent, water, salt, oil

Mekitsa (Bulgarian: мекица, romanized: mekitsa, lit. 'softness'; plural mekitsi) is a traditional Bulgarian dish made of kneaded dough made with yogurt that is deep fried. They are made with flour, eggs, yogurt, water, salt, oil and a leavening agent. In Serbia it is called mekike (sing. mekika), while mekica or pituljica in Macedonian and mekitsa in Bulgaria. It is similar to Hungarian lángos. Mekitsa is conventionally a breakfast dish.

After the dough rises, it is torn into small balls, spread into flat rounds and fried in oil. In some recipes, yeast, baking soda, milk or yogurt might be used. A recipe from Silistra involves yogurt and bread soda, one from a village near Stara Zagora uses yeast and yogurt, and a recipe from Aytos suggests yeast and milk. One of the oldest known recipes contains only yeast, flour, salt and sugar and it uses water as the sole wet ingredient. It is recommended that the shaping of mekitsi before their frying be done with wet or oiled hands, using most commonly vegetable oil.

When served, mekitsa is often powdered with icing sugar or garnished with jam, honey or sirene (white cheese). It can also be eaten with yogurt.

In North Macedonia, people prepare the dish the week after a newborn is born to celebrate the birth. Traditionally, the event should be in the house where the baby will live, but nowadays this celebration mostly happens in restaurants.

The dish is popular in the Bulgarian, Macedonian, and Serbian regions and is a common cultural dish. The name is derived from the Slavic root mek ("soft"), referring to the dish's texture. –itsa is a Slavic feminine suffix.

== See also ==
- List of doughnut varieties
- List of fried dough foods
- Shelpek
