= Shelpek =

Central Asian flatbread

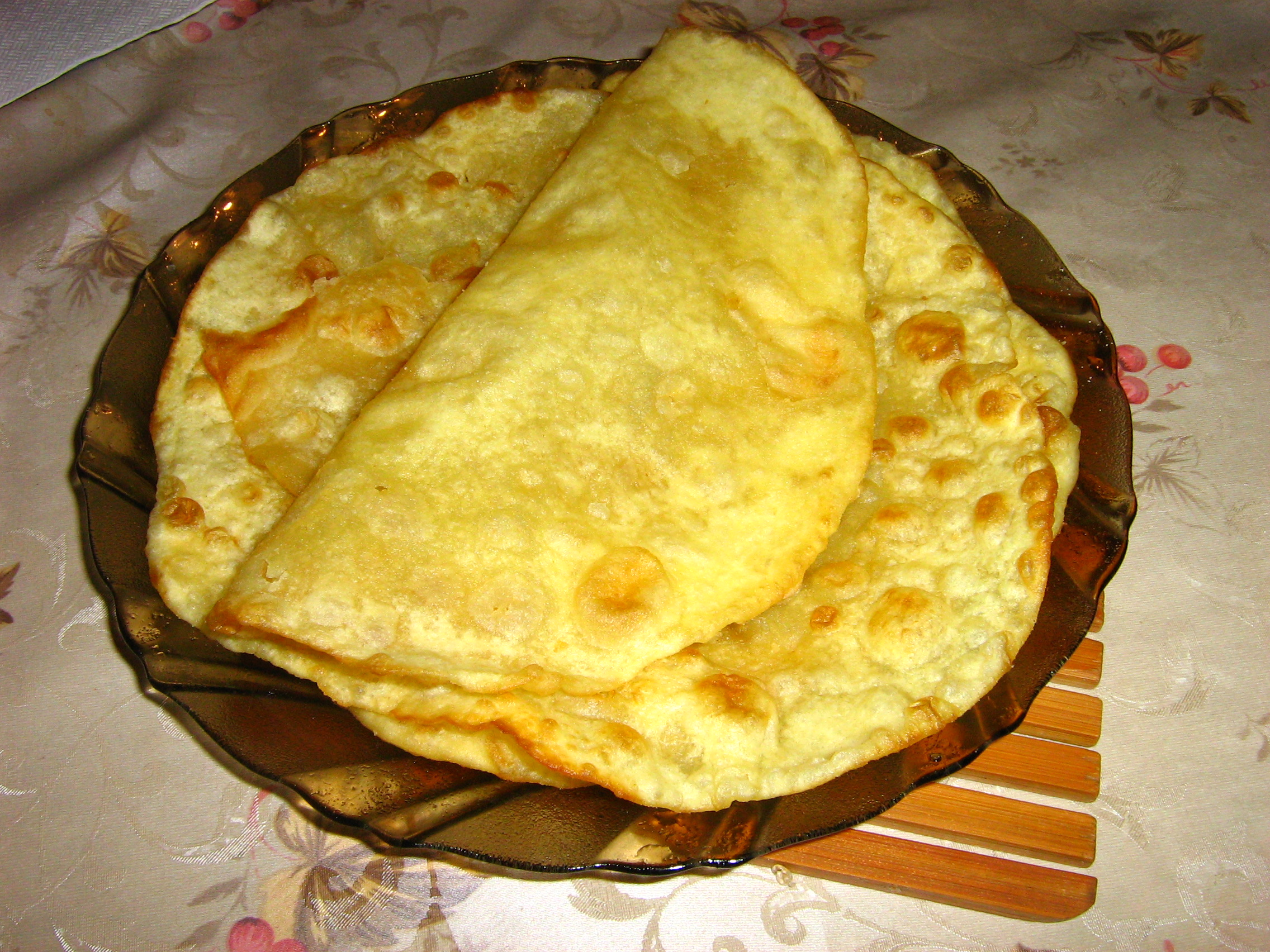
- Shelpeks on a plate
- Alternative names: Chalpak, Chalpyak
- Region or state: Central Asia
- Created by: Oghuz Turks
- Main ingredients: flour, milk, water & salt

А Shelpek, chalpak or chalpyak (Turkmen: çelpek; Kazakh: шелпек, жеті-нан, romanized: shelpek, zheti-nan; Kyrgyz: май токоч, челпек; Uzbek: chalpak; Uyghur: чалпак, romanized: chalpyak) is a traditional flatbread commonly consumed throughout Central Asia. The main ingredients are flour, water or milk, and salt, and some recipes call for ripened sour cream and a small amount of sugar and baking soda. Shelpeks are often eaten with butter, honey, jam, or tea, and they can be paired with meat or dairy dishes.

The dough is shaped into flat disks and fried in hot vegetable oil until it becomes a golden color. Shelpeks can also be prepared with yeast, which makes the dough stay soft for a longer period of time. The recipe to prepare the dough is similar to the one used for baursaks.

A Kazakh tradition is to prepare multiples of seven shelpeks, or zheti-nan, on Thursdays. It is believed that the scent emitted during the frying process nourishes the ancestors, or aruakhs.

== See also ==
- Qistibi very similar turnover
- Chiburekki very similar turnover
- Haliva
- Börek
- Fried dough
- Gözleme
- Khuushuur
- Lángos
- Lörtsy
- Pastel (food)
- Puri (food)
- Qutab
- Samosa
