= BeaverTails =

Canadian restaurant chain, specializing in pastries

BeaverTails Pastry Queues de Castor pâtisserie
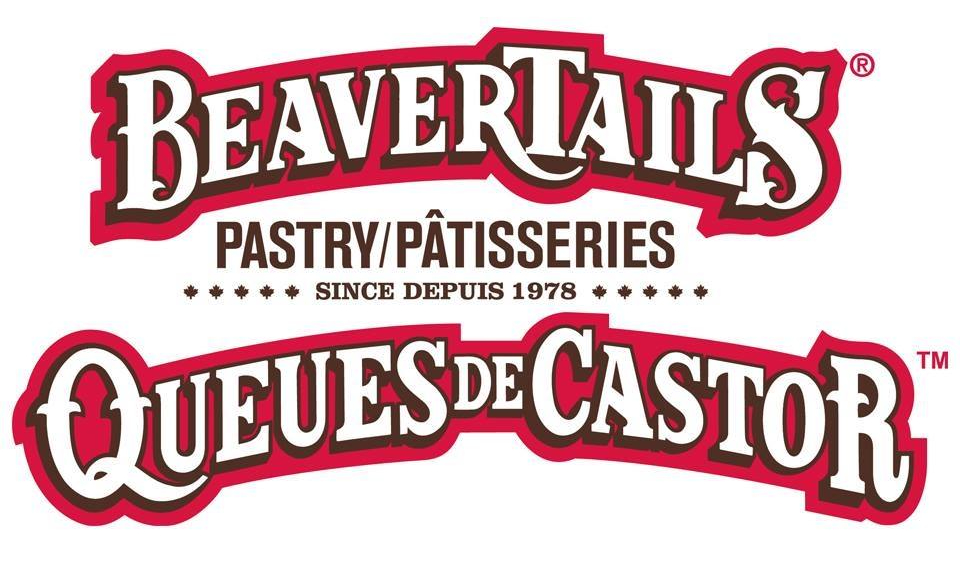

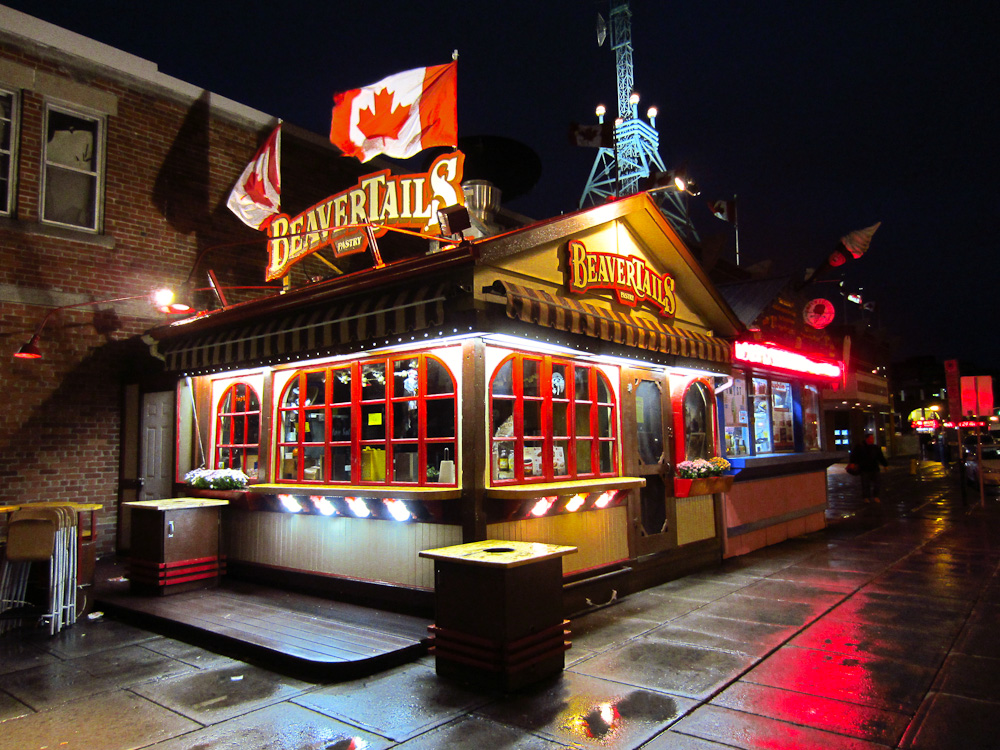
- Type: Private
- Industry: Food
- Founded: 1978; 48 years ago, in Killaloe, Ontario
- Founder: Grant and Pam Hooker
- Headquarters: Montreal, Quebec, Canada
- Area served: Canada; US; France; Qatar; Mexico; UAE; Japan
- Products: Pastry
- Owner: Pino Di Ioia, Anthony Di Ioia, and Tina Serrao.
- Website: beavertails.com

BeaverTails is a Canadian restaurant chain, specializing in pastries known as BeaverTails, that is operated by BeaverTails Canada Inc. Its namesake products are fried dough pastries, individually hand-stretched to resemble beaver's tails, with various toppings added on the pastry.

The chain originated in Killaloe, Ontario in 1978 and opened its first permanent store in Ottawa two years later. By 2018, it had 140 franchise and licence locations in six countries: Canada (the Maritimes, Newfoundland and Labrador, Nunavut, Ontario, Manitoba, Alberta, British Columbia and Quebec, where the franchise is called Queues de Castor), the United States (New Hampshire, Michigan, Wisconsin, Tennessee, Arkansas and Utah), the United Arab Emirates, Qatar, Mexico, France, and Japan.

== Company history ==
BeaverTails began when Grant and Pam Hooker turned their family recipe for fried dough into a corporate business. They sold their first pastries at the Killaloe Craft and Community Fair in 1978.

The concept was based on a recipe for fried pastry dough from Grant Hooker's grandmother, who was of German origin.

Two years later, they opened the first BeaverTails stand in the Byward Market in Ottawa. In 1987, Pino Di Ioia accepted a summer position as the manager of the BeaverTails location at La Ronde. In 2002, along with his wife and twin brother, they took over the management of BeaverTails.

== Products ==
=== BeaverTail ===
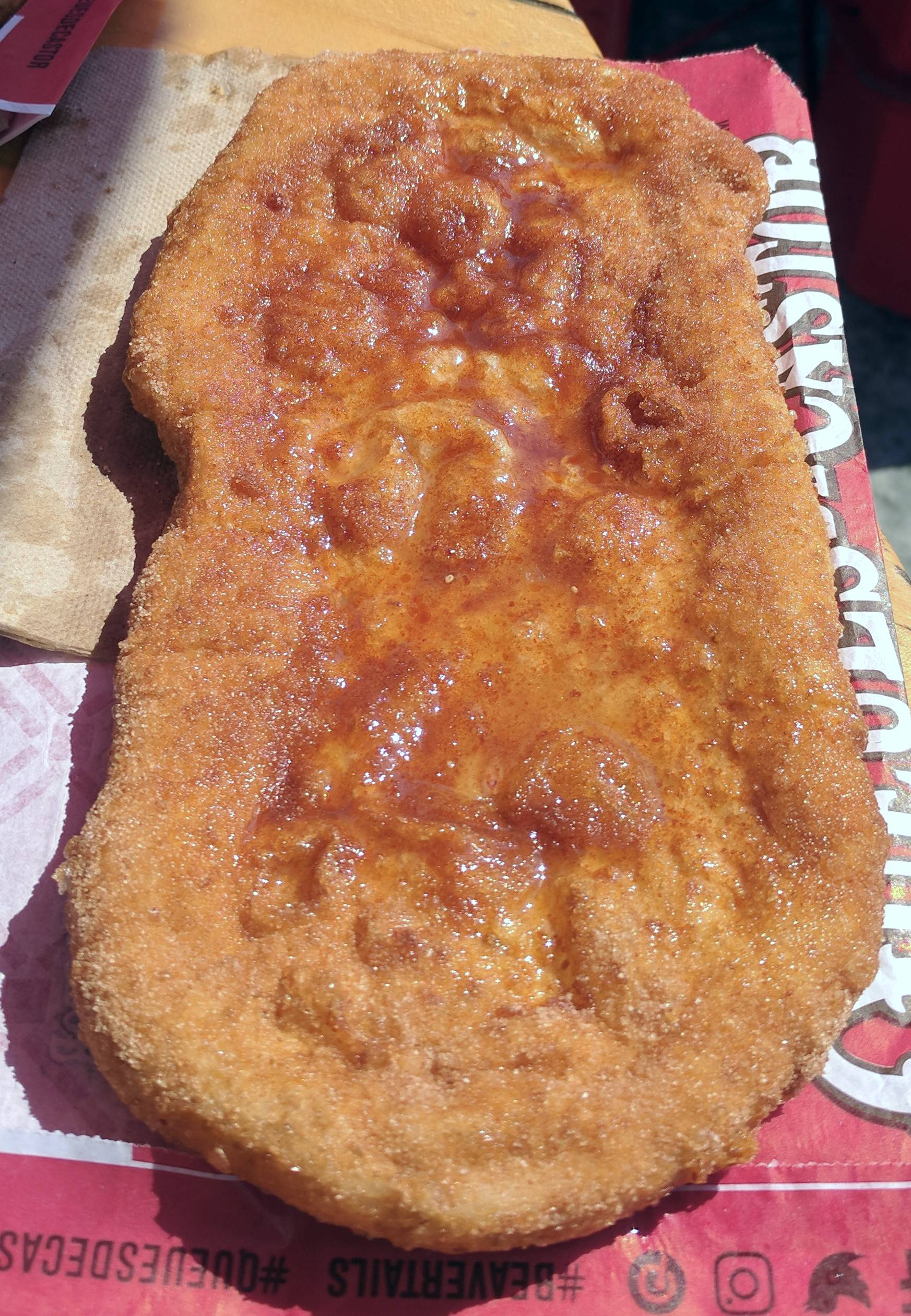
A classic BeaverTails pastry with cinnamon and sugar

The BeaverTail is a fried dough pastry that is sold in a variety of flavours. Most flavours of BeaverTails are topped with sweet condiments and confections, such as whipped cream, banana slices, crumbled Oreos, cinnamon sugar, and chocolate hazelnut. BeaverTails are also made in savoury variations, such as with poutine or hotdogs.

"BeaverTails" and "Queues de Castor" have been registered as trademarks since 1988 by BeaverTails Canada Inc and its affiliated companies.

== In the media ==
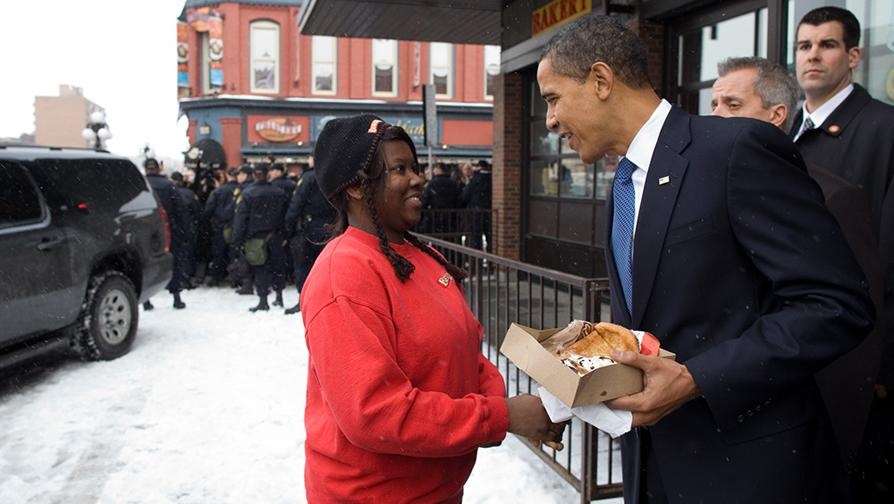
Then-US President Barack Obama after purchasing a BeaverTail at the ByWard Market location in Ottawa on 19 February 2009

BeaverTails received media attention in the US and Canada when it was served at the Canadian embassy during the first inauguration of US President Barack Obama. The product was also mentioned in newscasts during the lead-up to his visit to Ottawa on 19 February 2009, as an example of how Canadian businesses were participating. While in town, he stopped at the ByWard Market on his way to the Ottawa International Airport to buy a BeaverTails pastry. One variation of the product, a classic cinnamon and sugar pastry with maple flavoured eyes and a Nutella O for Obama, was called the "Obama Tail", in honour of the visit. He also purchased some maple leaf shaped cookies that became known as "Obama cookies".

== See also ==
- List of Canadian restaurant chains
- List of coffeehouse chains
- List of doughnut shops
- List of doughnut varieties
