= Sufganiyah =

Round jelly-filled doughnut served at Hanukkah

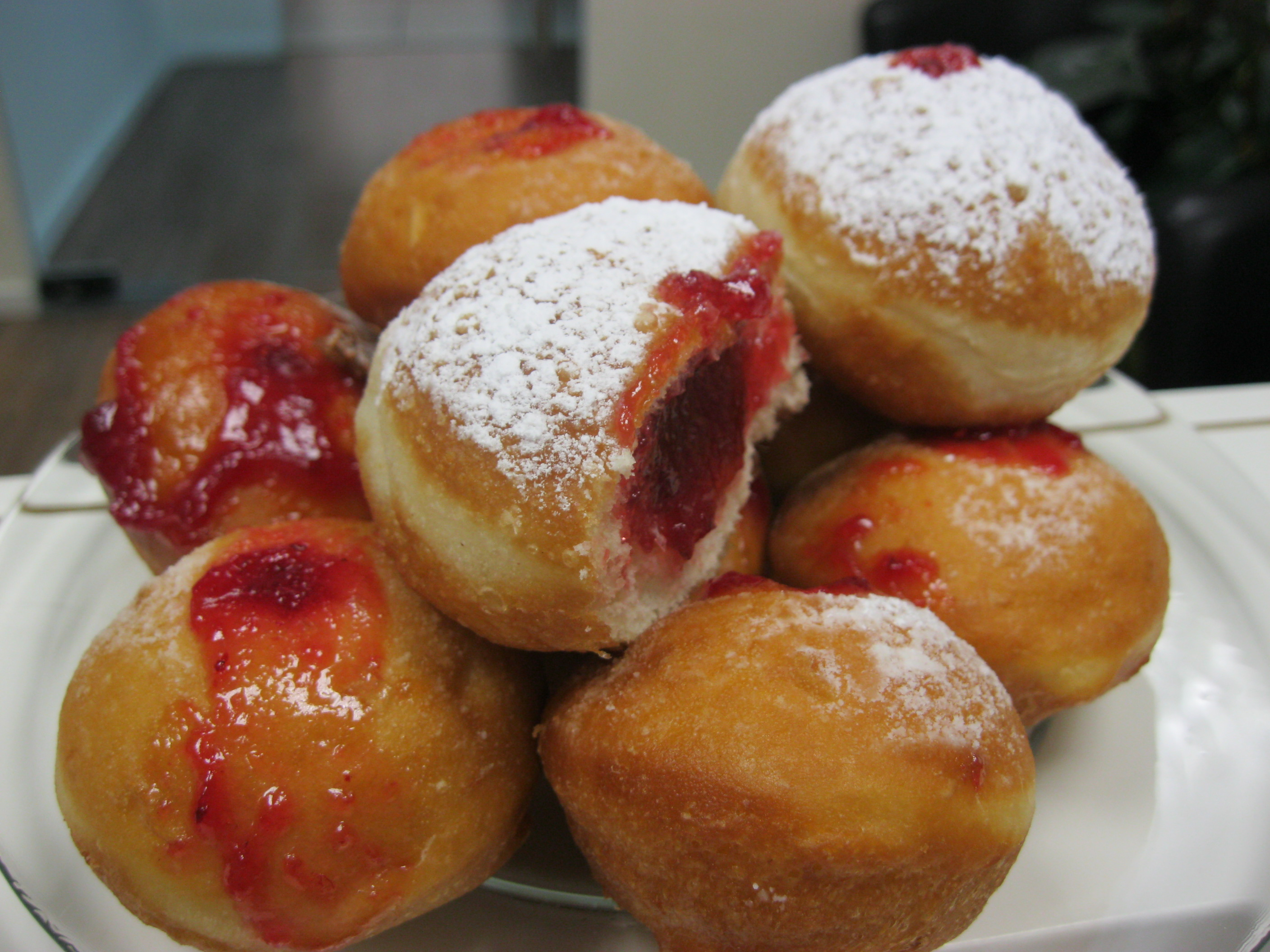
- Classic Hanukkah sufganiyot
- Alternative names: Sufganiot
- Type: Jelly doughnut
- Place of origin: Europe, Mediterranean basin
- Main ingredients: Dough, jelly filling, powdered sugar

Sufganiyah (Hebrew: סופגנייה or סופגניה, Hebrew: [ˌsufɡaniˈja]; pl.: sufganiyot, Hebrew: סופגניות, Hebrew: [ˌsufɡaniˈjot], or in Yiddish pontshke פּאָנטשקע) is a round, jelly doughnut–like pastry, eaten around the world during the Jewish festival of Hanukkah. The doughnut is deep-fried, injected with jam or custard, and then topped with powdered sugar. The doughnut recipe originated in Europe in the 16th century, and by the 19th century was known as a Berliner in Germany and a Religieuse in France. Polish Jews, who called them ponchki, fried the doughnuts in schmaltz rather than lard due to kashrut laws. The ponchik was brought to Israel by Polish Jewish immigrants, where it was renamed the sufganiyah based on the Talmud's description of a "spongy dough".

== Background ==
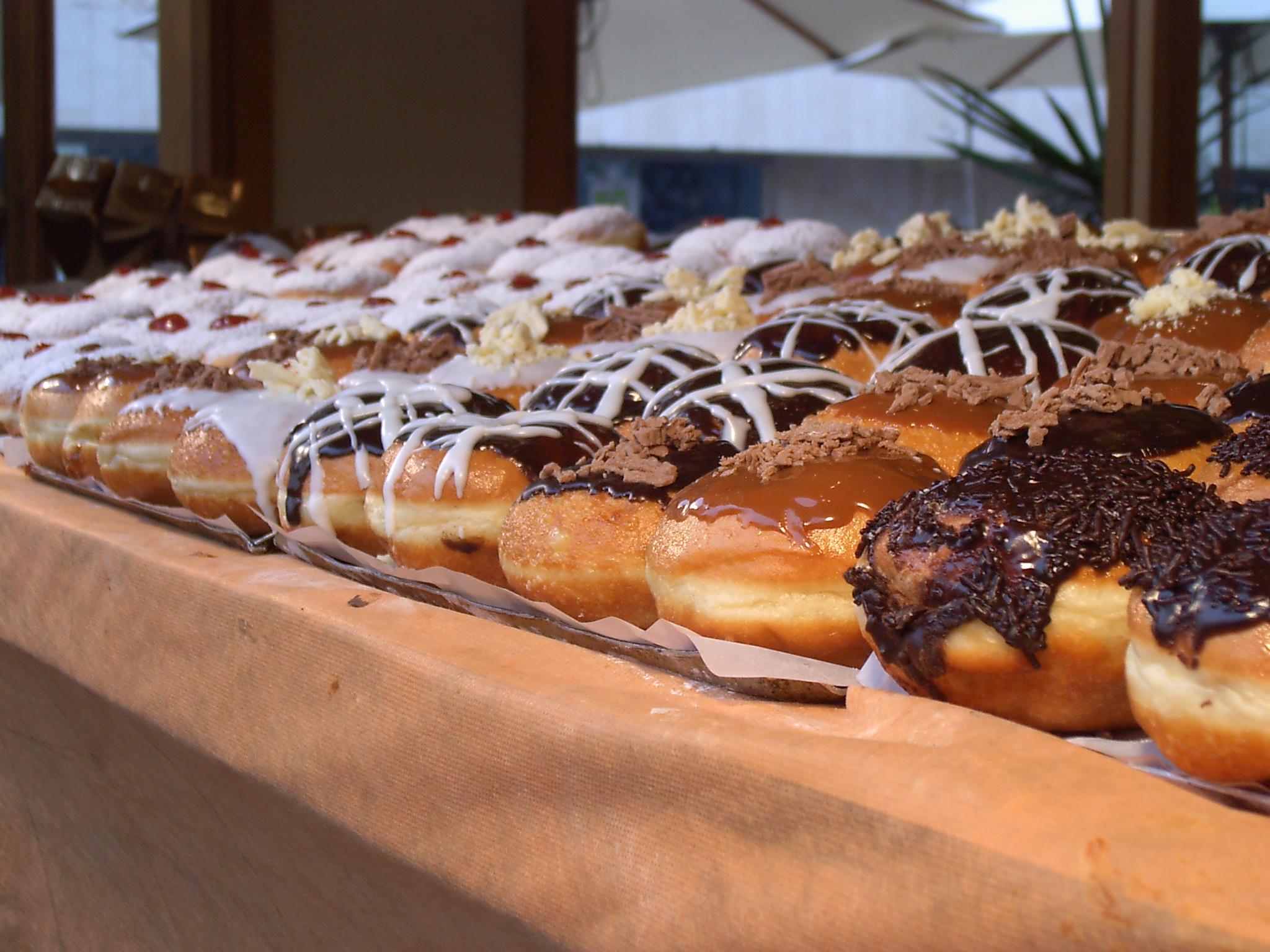
Various sufganiyot for sale at a bakery in Tel Aviv

On Hanukkah, Jews observe the custom of eating fried foods in commemoration of the miracle associated with the Temple oil. The tradition of eating deep-fried pastries on Hanukkah was considered ancient even in the time of the 12th-century rabbi Maimonides, whose father, Rabbi Maimon ben Yosef, wrote that "one must not make light of the custom of eating sofganim [fritters] on Chanukah. It is a custom of the Kadmonim [the ancient ones]". These sofganim were likely syrup-soaked fried cakes, akin to modern zalabiya in the Arab world.

== Etymology ==
The Hebrew word sufganiyah is a neologism for pastry, based on the Talmudic words sofgan and sfogga, which refer to a "spongy dough". The word is built on the same root as the Modern Hebrew word for sponge (ספוג, sfog), which is derived from Koine Greek: σπόγγος, romanized: spóngos. Sfenj, a Maghrebi doughnut, comes from the same root.

A popular Israeli folktale holds that the word "sufganiyah" comes from the Hebrew expression "Sof Gan Yud-Heh" ("סוף גן יה"), meaning "the end of the Garden of the Lord" (referring to the Garden of Eden). According to the legend, when Adam and Eve were cast out of the Garden by the Lord, He cheered them up by feeding them sufganiyot. No known commentator on the Tanakh supports this interpretation.

== History ==
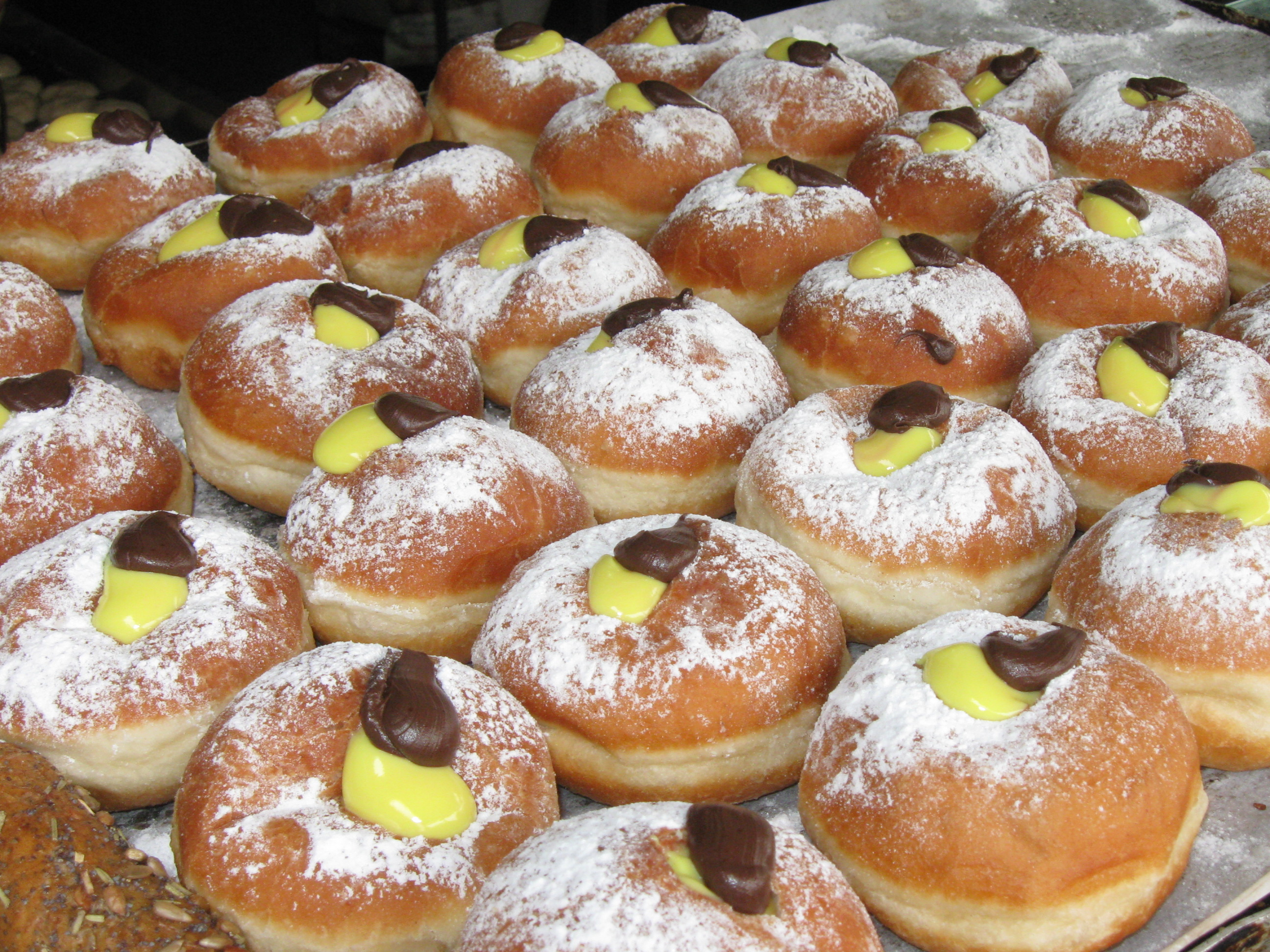
Sufganiyot piped with chocolate and vanilla cream in Mahane Yehuda Market, Jerusalem

According to Israeli Author Carol Green Ungar, written references to the consumption of "sofganim" in Spain exist dating back to the 12th century, attributed to Rabbi Maimon ben Yosef, Father of Maimonides, who himself alleges that the tradition predates himself. Food historian Emelyn Rude also describes "sfani", possible precursors to modern Sufganiyot, fried dough balls eaten by Jewish traders during Chanukah, brought to Europe from North Africa.

According to food historian Gil Marks, the recipe for a filled jelly doughnut was first published in a 1485 cookbook in Nuremberg. The "Gefüllte Krapfen" consisted of "a bit of jam sandwiched between two rounds of yeast bread dough and deep-fried in lard". This doughnut became popular in northern European countries from Denmark to Russia during the 16th century. In 19th-century Germany it began to be called a Berliner or a Bismarck, after German Chancellor Otto von Bismarck.

Among Polish Jews, the jelly doughnut was fried in oil or schmaltz rather than lard, due to kashrut laws. In Poland, these doughnuts were known as ponchkis. Polish Jewish immigrants to Mandatory Palestine brought along their recipe as well as the tradition of eating them on Hanukkah. In Israel, however, they took on a new name—sufganiyot—based on the Talmud's description of a "spongy dough" (see the Etymology section).

== Description ==
The ponchik-style sufganiyah was originally made from two circles of dough surrounding a jelly filling, stuck together and fried in one piece. Although this method is still practiced, an easier technique commonly used today is to deep-fry whole balls of dough, and then inject them with a filling through a baker's syringe (or a special industrial machine).

Modern-day sufganiyot in Israel are made from sweet yeast dough, filled with plain red jelly (usually strawberry, sometimes raspberry), and topped with powdered sugar. Fancier versions are stuffed with dulce de leche, chocolate cream, vanilla cream, cappuccino, halva, creme espresso, chocolate truffle, or araq, and topped with various extravagant toppings, from coconut shavings and tiny vials of liquor to meringue and fruit pastes. In 2014 one Jerusalem bakery produced sufganiyah dough saturated with flavored vodka.

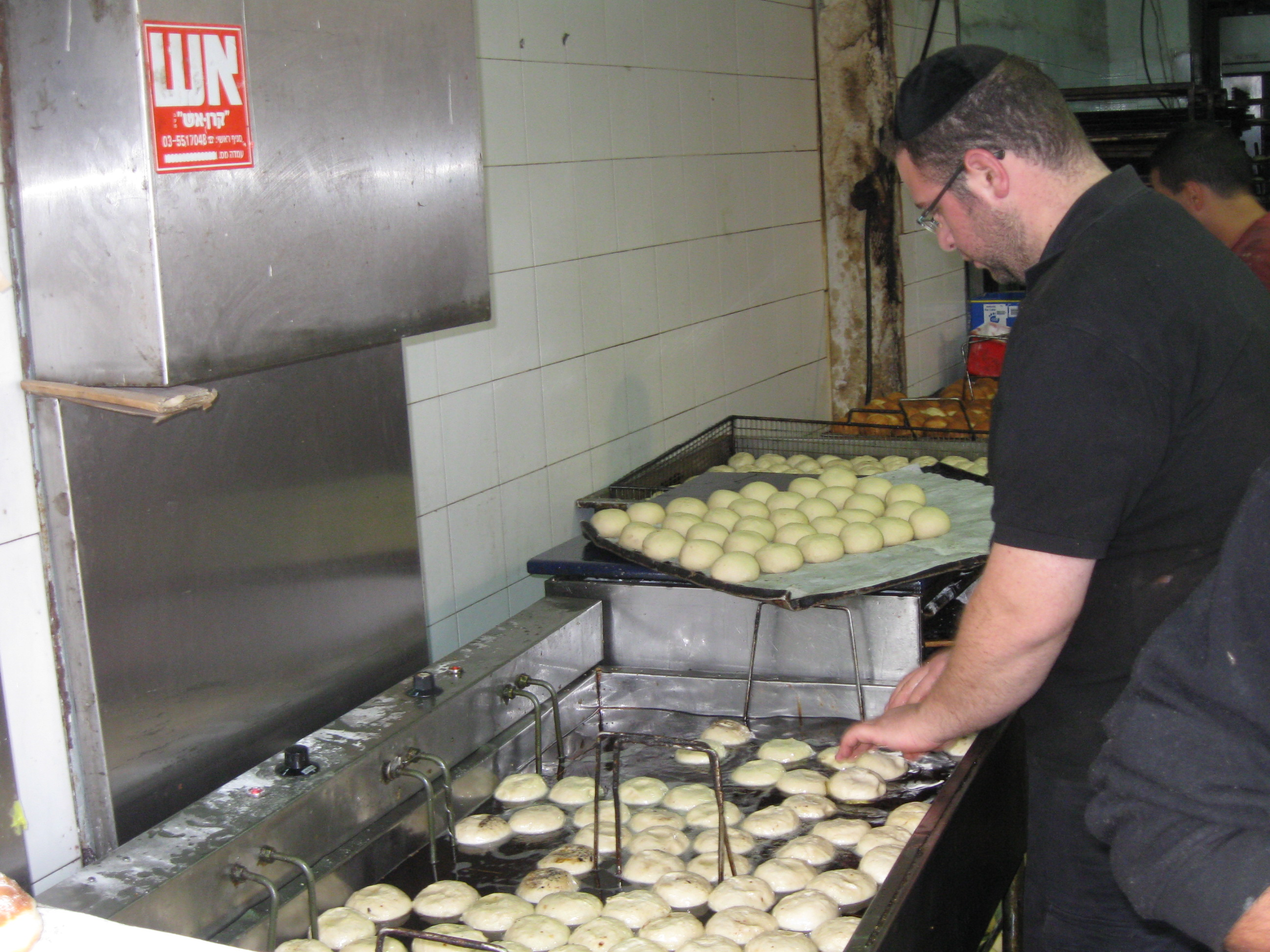
A baker deep-fries sufganiyot at the Mahane Yehuda Market, Jerusalem.

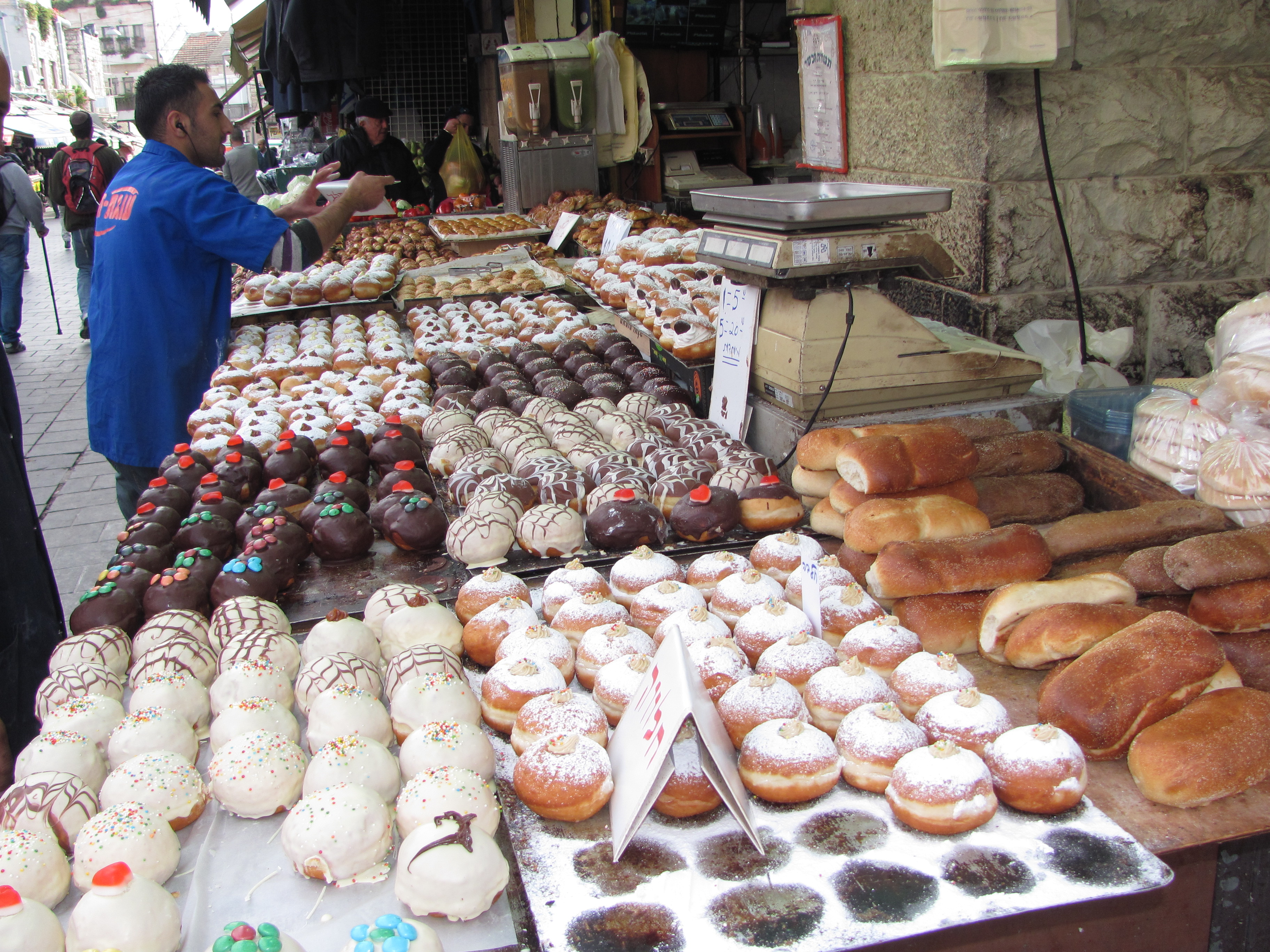
Powdered and iced sufganiyot for sale in Jerusalem before Hanukkah 2014

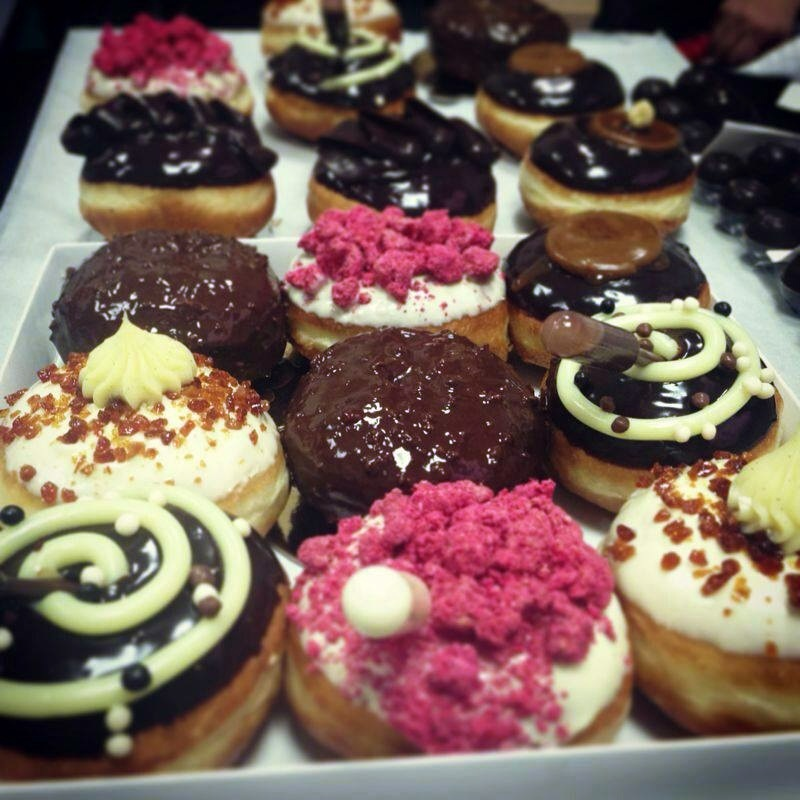
Sufganiyot from Roladin, an Israeli bakery chain

=== Mini sufganiyot ===
In 2016, Israeli bakeries began downsizing sufganiyot to appeal to health-conscious consumers, following an anti-junk food campaign by Health Minister Yaakov Litzman. The usual 100-gram (3.5 oz) size, packing 400 to 600 calories (1,700 to 2,500 kJ), now appears in 50-gram (1.8 oz) size with different fillings and toppings, earning the name "mini".

== Popularity ==
=== In Israel ===
Until the 1920s, sufganiyot and latkes were of comparable popularity among Jews in Mandatory Palestine during the Hanukkah holiday. The Histadrut, Israel's national labor union, formed in 1920, pushed to replace the homemade latke with the sufganiyah as Israel's quintessential Hanukkah food to provide more work for its members. Commercial bakeries began selling sufganiyot days and weeks before Hanukkah began, lengthening the employment period. Their effort was successful, and sufganiyot became the most popular food for Hanukkah in Israel. (Note: Some sources report that something similar happened with sfenj and sufganiyot, though this is less well-supported.) By the 21st century, more Israeli Jews report eating sufganiyot on Hanukkah than fasting on Yom Kippur.

Today sufganiyot are sold by Israeli bakeries as early as September. Angel Bakeries, the largest bakery in Israel, reportedly fries up more than 25,000 sufganiyot every day during the eight-day Hanukkah festival itself. Each batch uses 100 kg (220 lb) of dough and makes 1,600 sufganiyot. Local newspapers add to the excitement by rating the "best sufganiyah in town".

The Ministry of Defense buys upwards of 400,000 sufganiyot for its soldiers each Hanukkah. As the troops overwhelmingly prefer jelly-filled doughnuts, the Defense Ministry purchases 80% with jelly filling and 20% with chocolate filling.

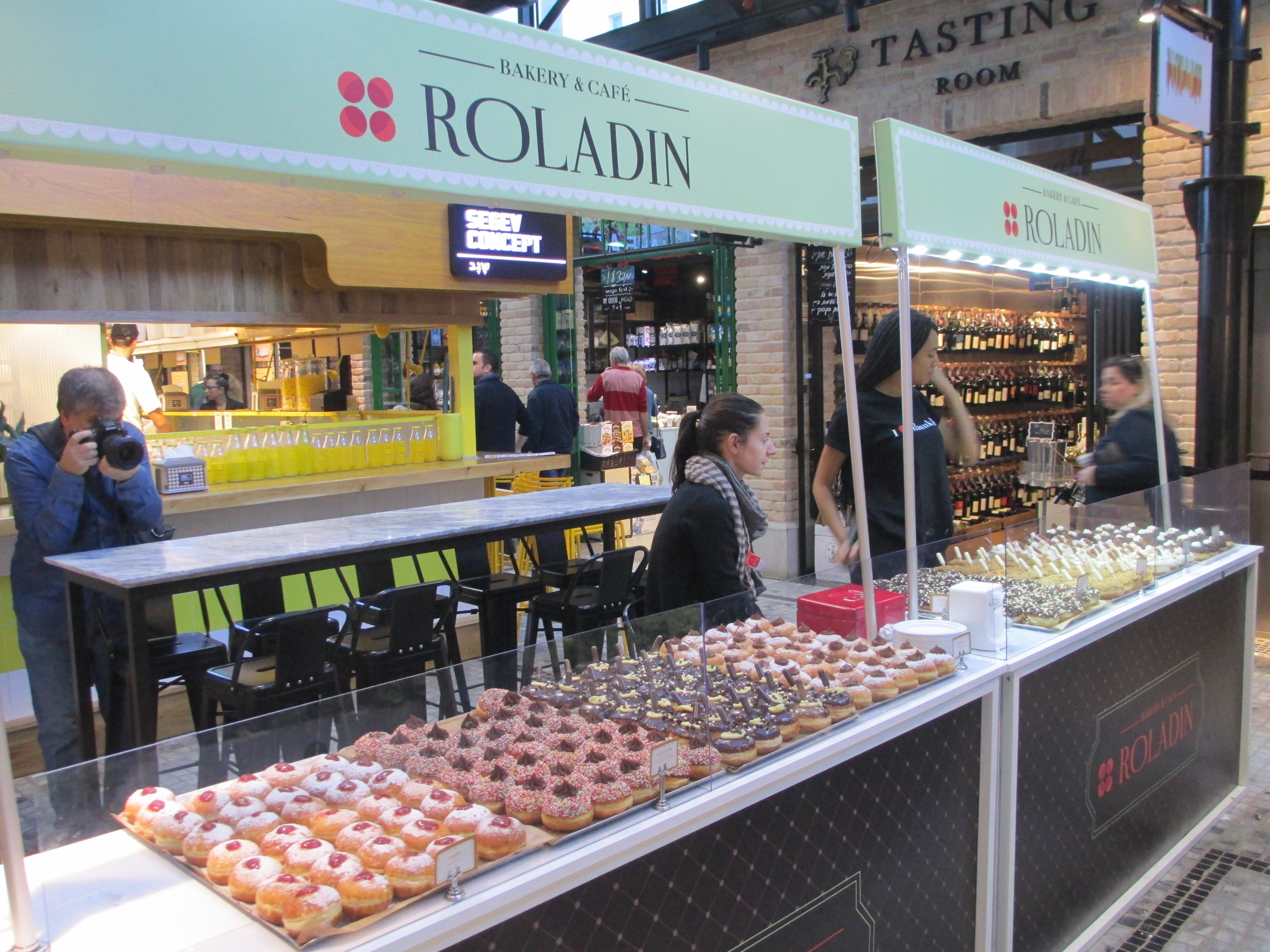
Sufganiyot for sale at a stall in the Sarona Market

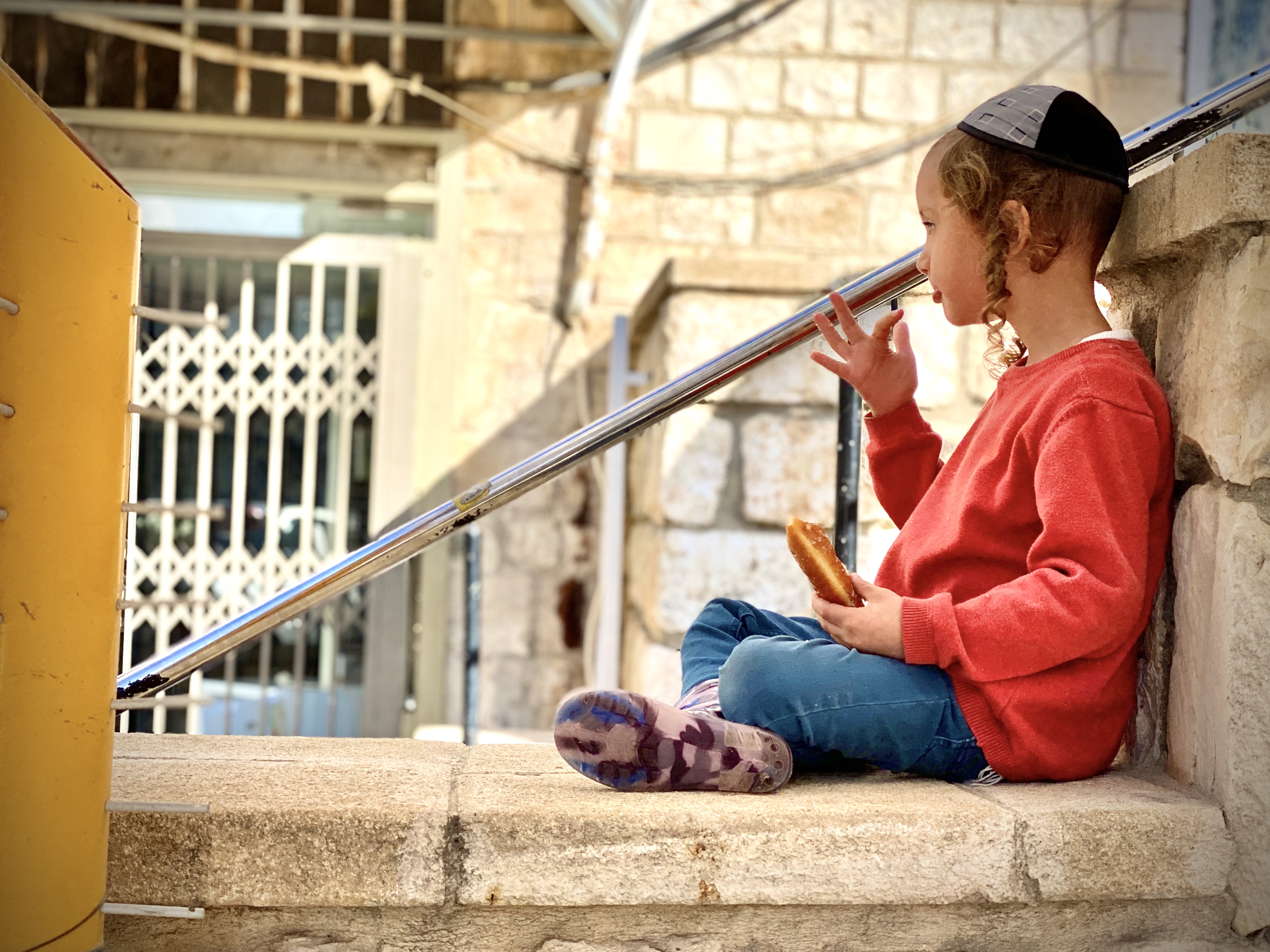
A haredi boy eats a sufganiyah in the old city of Safed.

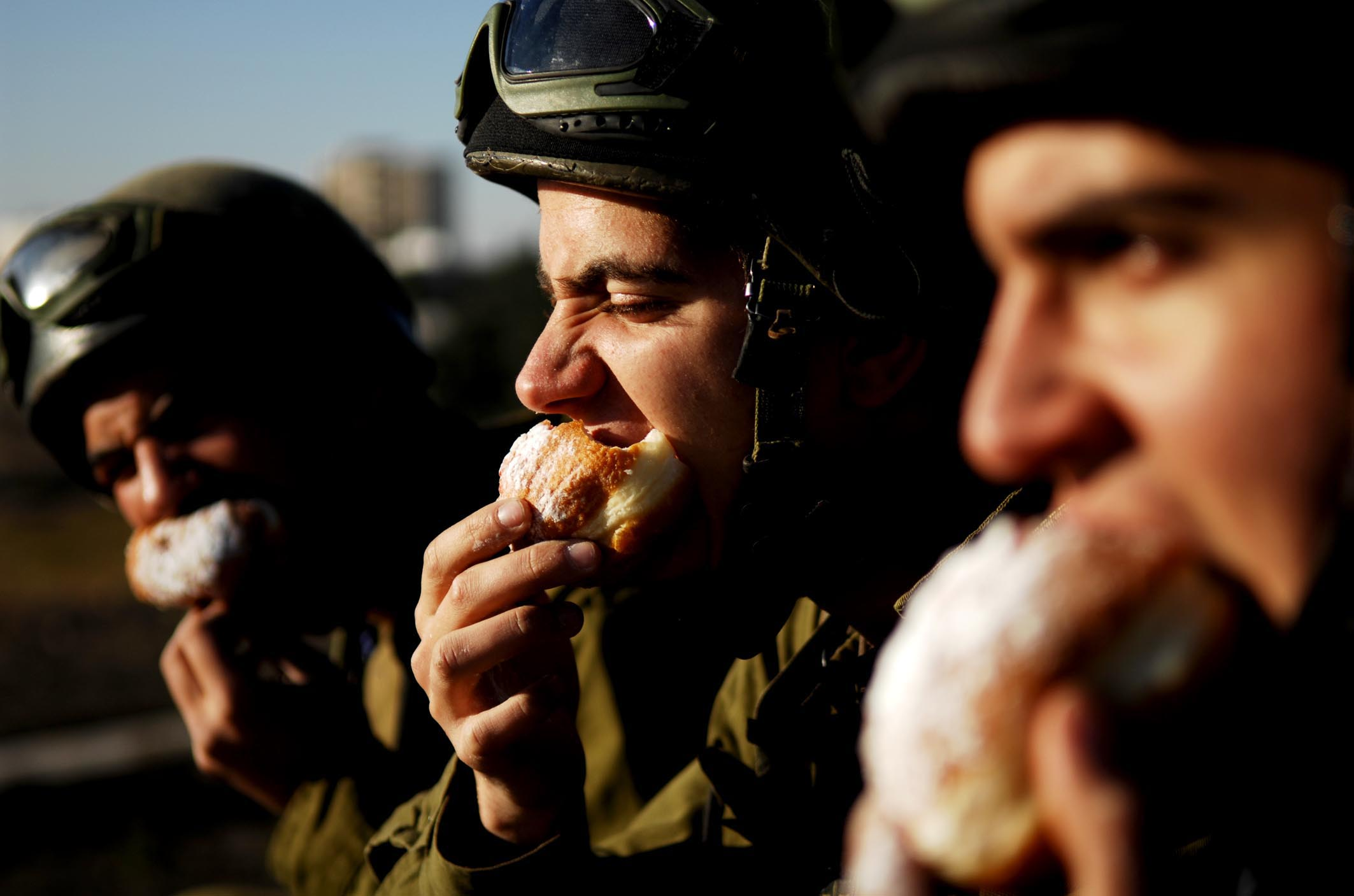
Israeli soldiers enjoying sufganiyot as part of their Hanukkah festivities

=== In other Jewish communities ===
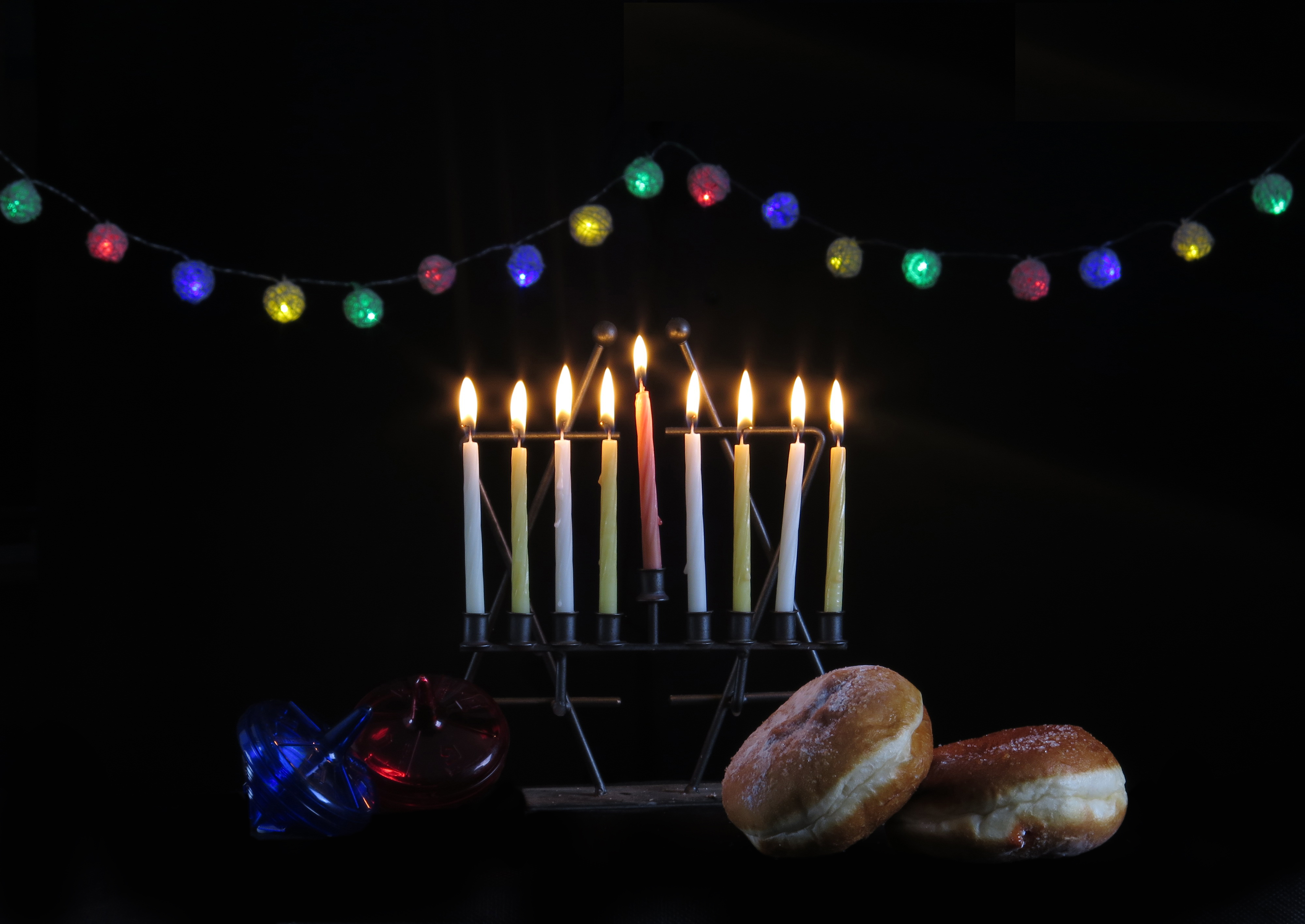
Sufganiyot are a symbol of Hanukkah worldwide.

Sufganiyot are a relatively recent introduction to the United States, where latkes are the traditional Hanukkah food. According to Gil Marks, latke was still the dominant choice in American Jewish homes in 2012. Rabbi Levi Shemtov in 2019 said, "Latkes used to dominate in the U.S., while doughnuts dominated in Israel. Now, I think both are equally popular in the U.S."

The sufganiyah was introduced by American Jews who had visited or studied in Israel, and by Israeli Jews who had settled in the U.S. While sufganiyot were not commercially available in the United States before the 1970s, today bakeries in many Jewish communities sell sufganiyot, as do non-kosher bakeries. The doughnut chains Dunkin' Donuts and Krispy Kreme purvey sufganiyot in their kosher-certified outlets.

Sufganiyot are also sold in kosher shops in Europe. Smaller Jewish communities in Russia and Ukraine organize special "community bakes" to prepare sufganiyot for school and kindergarten parties.

== Savory varieties ==
Savory sufganiyot also exist. In 2018, The Jerusalem Post reported on a new trend of savory sufganiyot in Manhattan eateries, in which the dough is filled with chicken schnitzel, lamb bacon, liver, or pastrami. Other savory varieties include:

- Panzerotti in Italy, filled with mozzarella and tomato sauce.
- Lachmazikas in Spain, filled with everything from lamb and mushrooms to whitefish, ricotta, peppers, and herbs.
- Sambusa-inspired savory sufganiyot, filled with lentils and peas, are popular among Iraqi Jews in Israel.

== Gallery ==
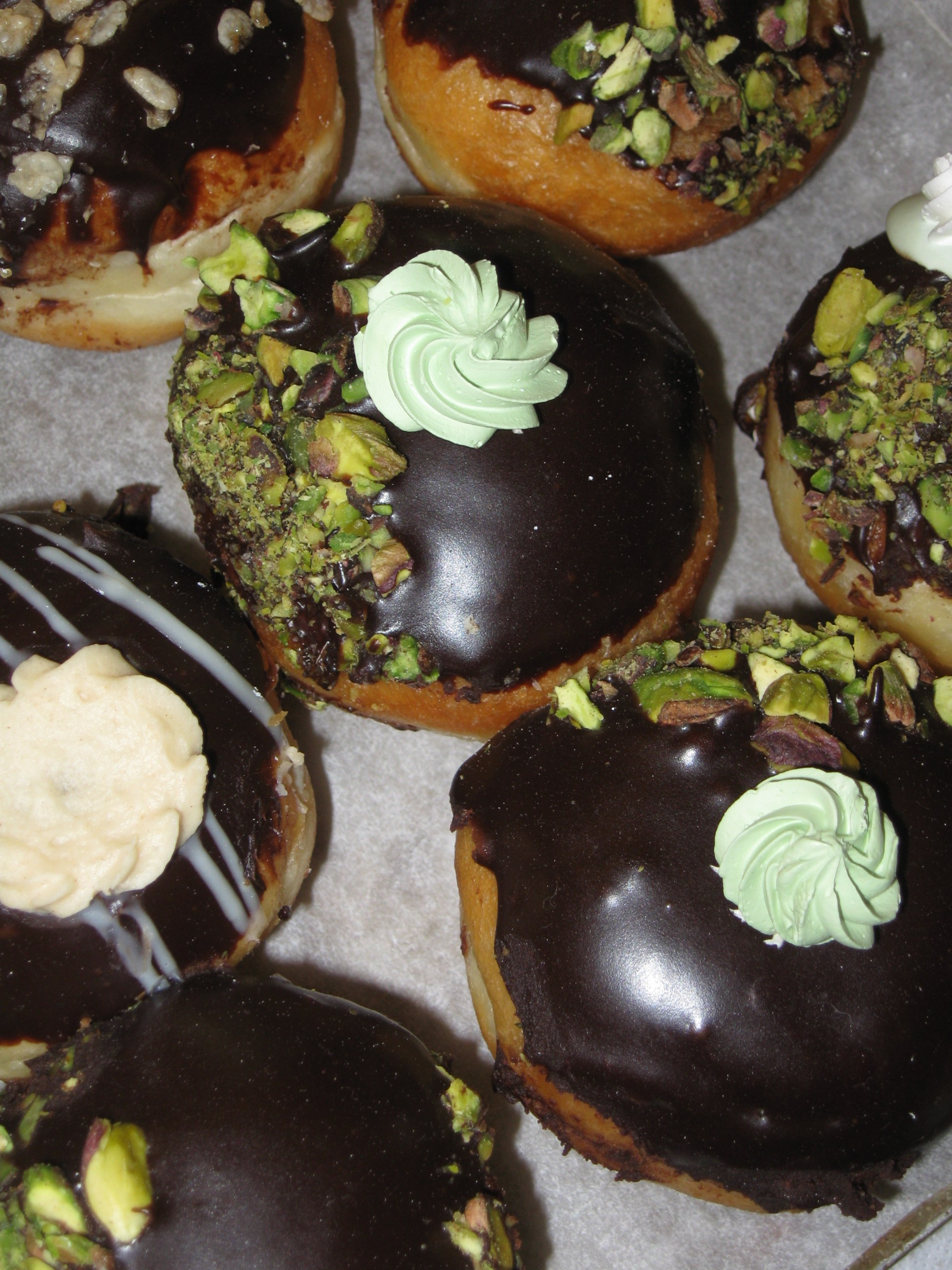
Elegantly styled "mini" sufganiyot

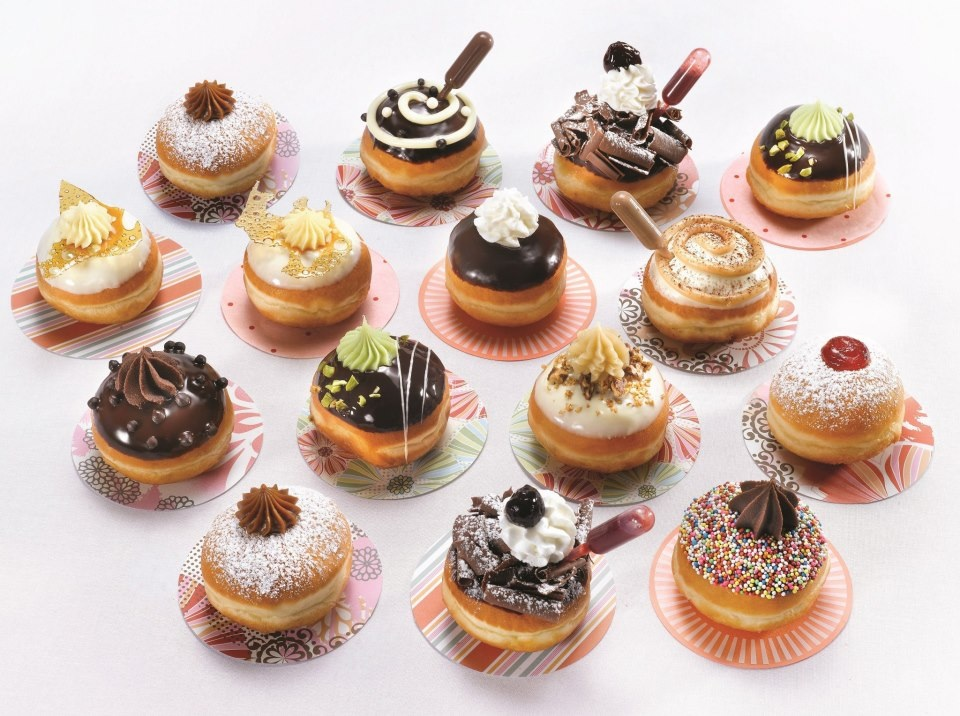
Fancy sufganiyot

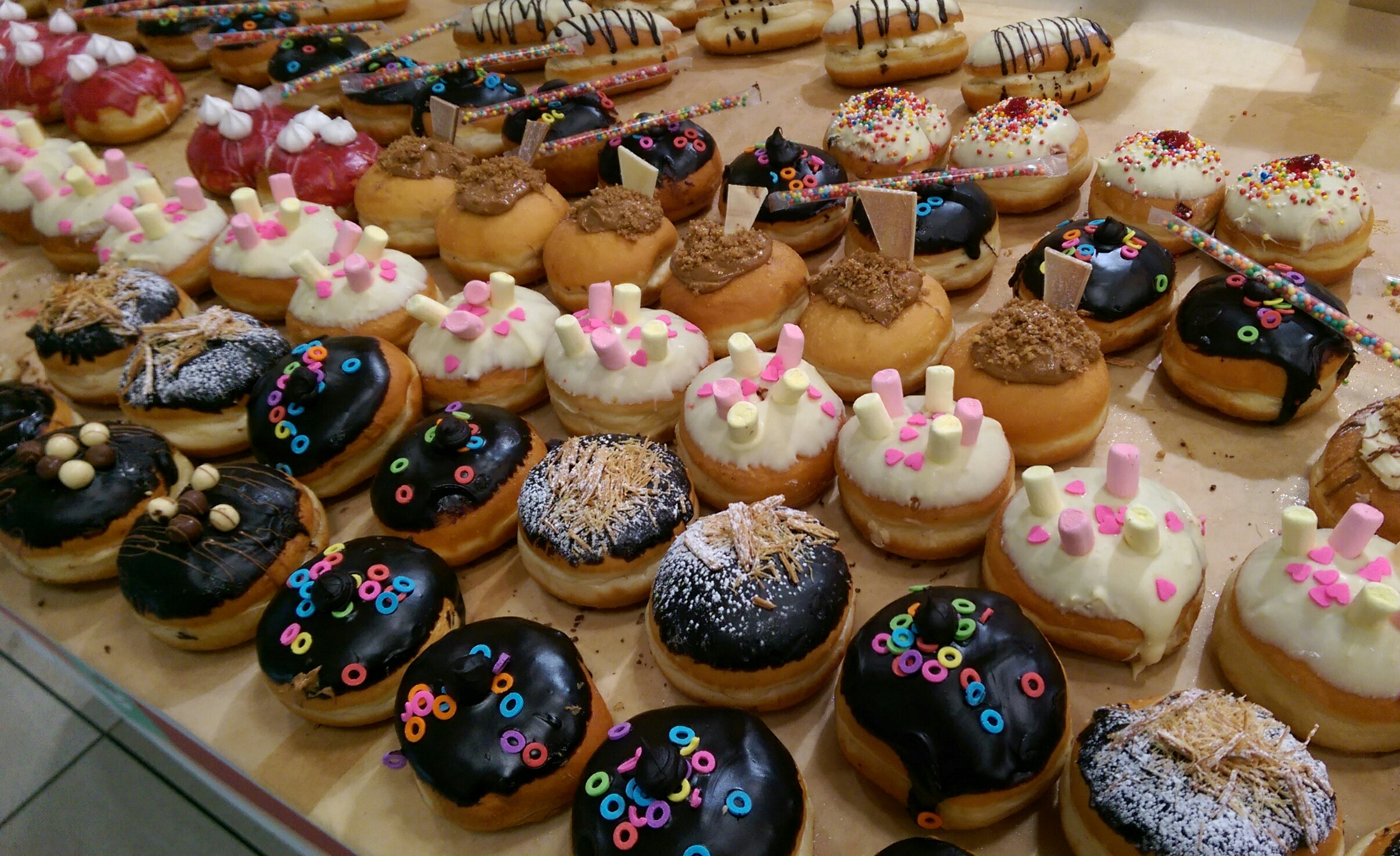
Sufganiyot from a bakery in Jerusalem

== See also ==
- List of doughnut varieties
- Israeli cuisine
- Culture of Israel
- Bimuelos – fritters served on Hanukkah by Sephardi Jews
- Bombolone
- Fritas de prasa
- Sfenj
- Zalabiyeh
