= Conejito =

Chilean pastry

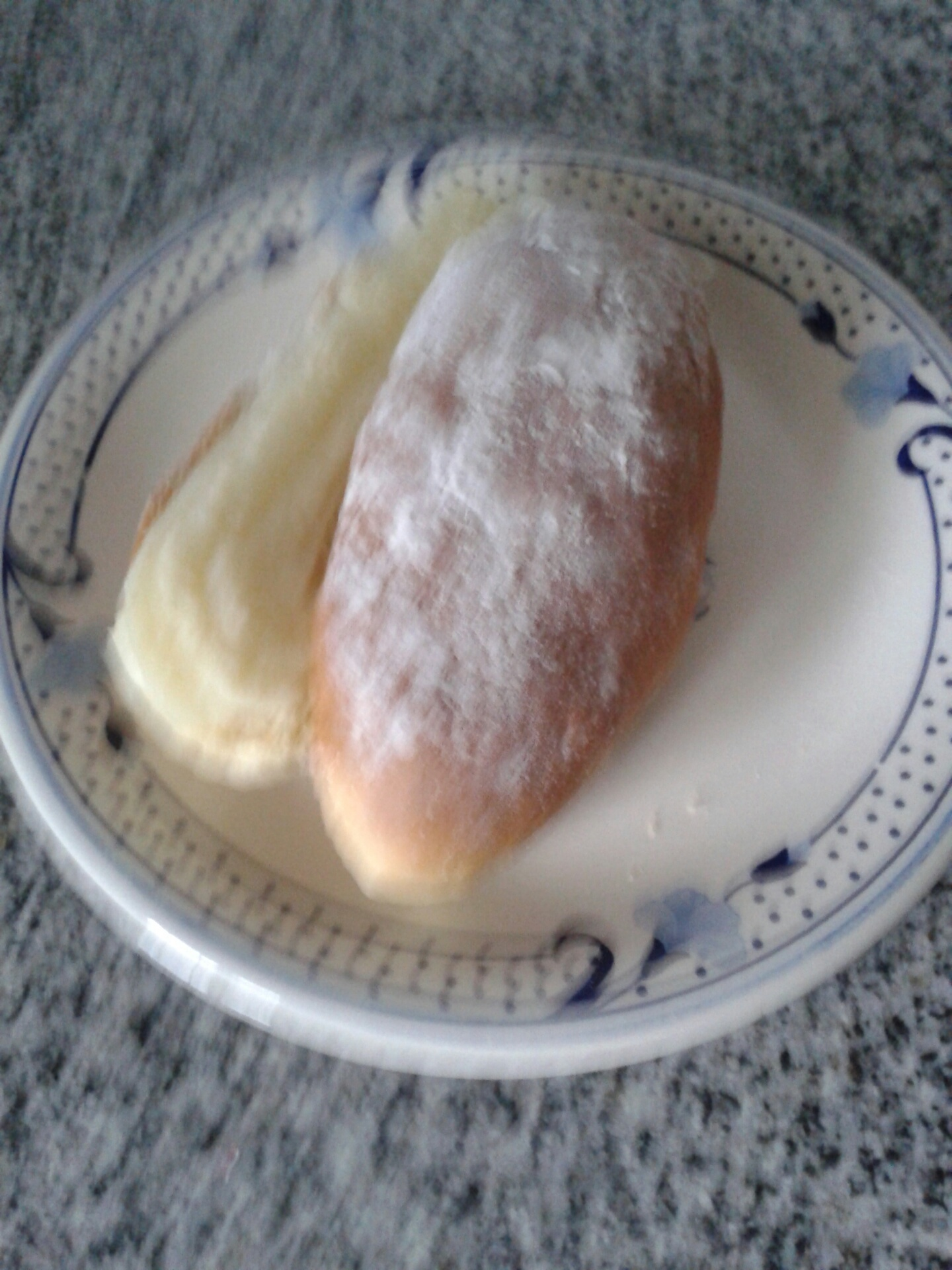
A conejito with powdered sugar on top

Conejos, Conejitos, or Conejitos chilenos (all in plural form) are traditional Chilean doughnut similar to berliner, in that they are filled with crème pâtissière (custard), but not fried. The dough is made with flour, eggs, sugar, milk, leavening, and butter. The filling (called "crema pastelera" in Spanish) is made with corn starch, egg yolks, milk, sugar, and vanilla.

== See also ==
- List of pastries
