= Kitchener bun =

Sweet pastry made and sold in South Australia since 1915

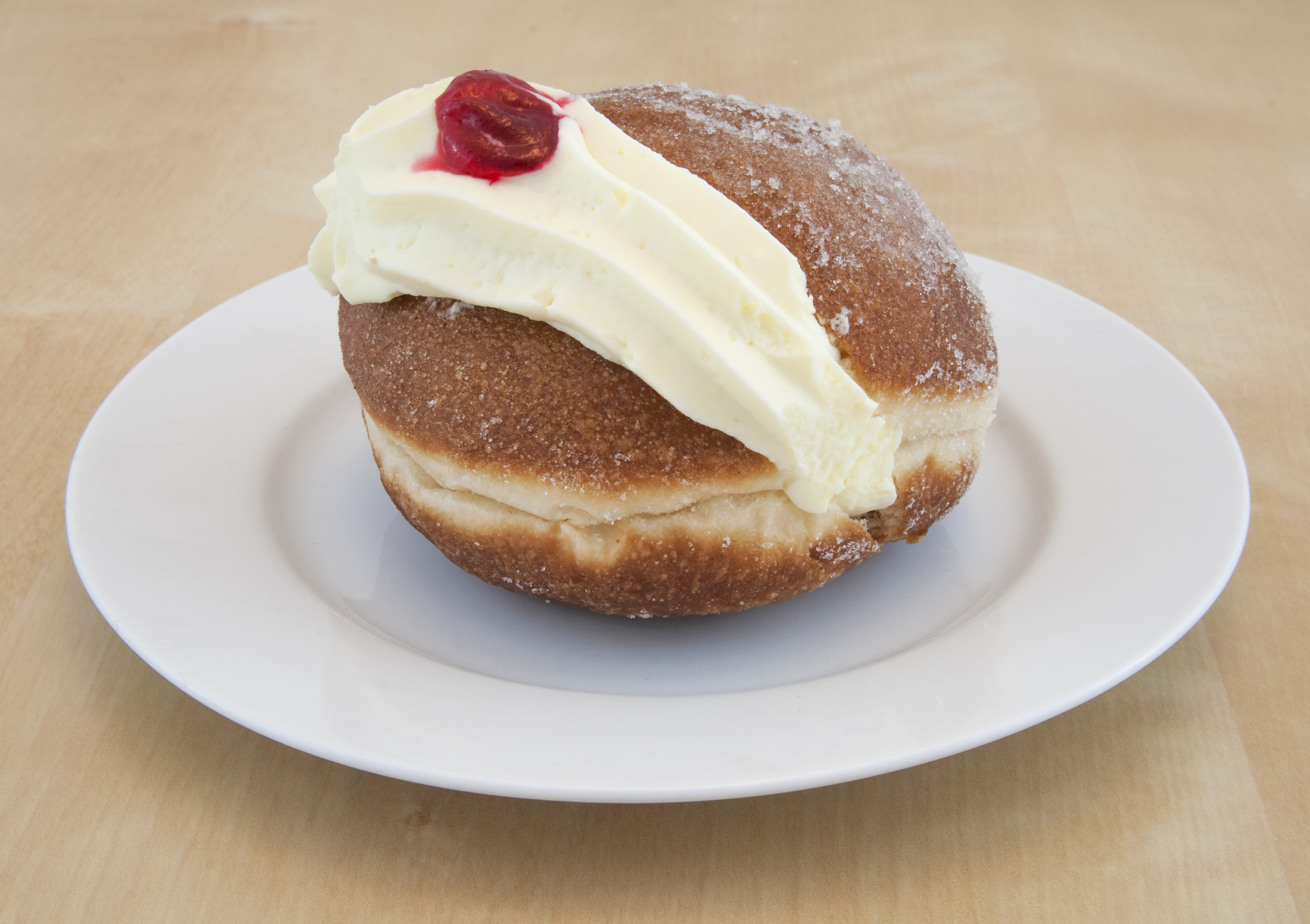
- Type: Doughnut
- Place of origin: Australia
- Region or state: South Australia
- Main ingredients: Dough, raspberry or strawberry jam, cream

The Kitchener bun is a type of doughnut made and sold in South Australia since 1915. It consists of a bun sometimes baked, sometimes fried, made from a sweet yeasted dough similar to that used for making doughnuts, split and then filled with raspberry or strawberry jam and cream, most often with a dusting of sugar on the top.

The Kitchener bun resembles the Berliner, a doughnut of German origin – although distinguished from it by an open face and the use of more cream than jam – and was, in fact, known as such until anti-German sentiment in World War I led to its renaming in honour of the British field marshal Lord Kitchener.

In a 1930 recipe the jam is sealed into the doughnut before deep-frying in fat, and there is no mention of cream until 1934. Ten years later, an Unley Road baker was fined £15 2 (around $1000) for using cream in his Kitchener buns, contrary to provisions in the National Security Regulations.

== See also ==
- List of Australian place names changed from German names
- Jelly doughnut
