= Pączki =

Polish filled doughnuts

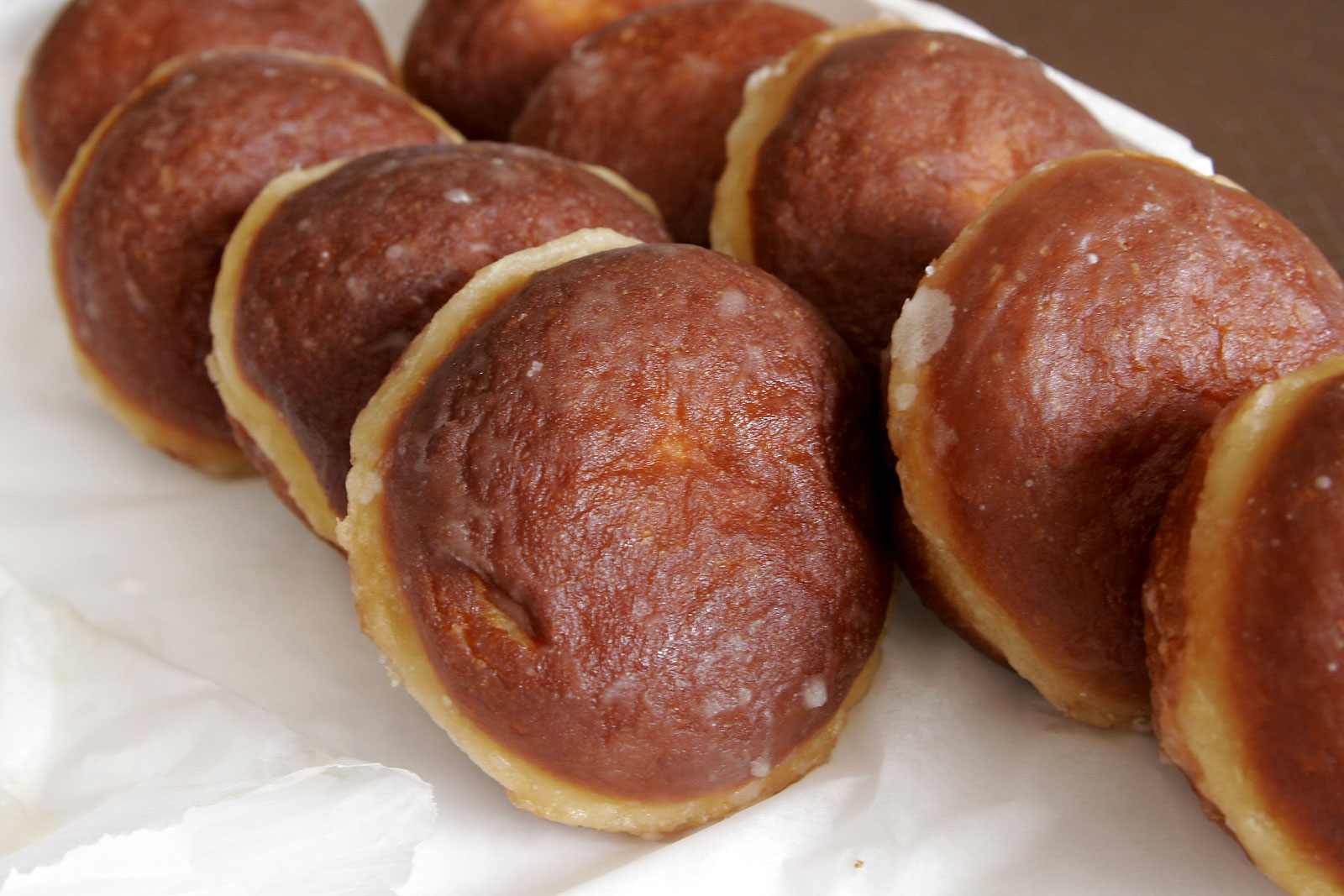
- Glazed pączki
- Alternative names: kreple, pùrcle
- Type: Doughnut
- Place of origin: Poland
- Region or state: Central Europe; North America
- Main ingredients: Yeast-based dough, grain alcohol, confiture or other sweet filling, powdered sugar, icing, glaze, or bits of dried orange zest

Pączki (Polish: [ˈpɔ̃t͡ʂkʲi]; sing.: pączek, Polish: [ˈpɔ̃t͡ʂɛk]; Kashubian: pùrcle Kashubian: [ˈpwʉrt͡slɛ]; Old Polish and Silesian: kreple Silesian: [ˈkrɛplɛ]; Yiddish: פּאָנטשקע, romanized: pontshke Yiddish: [ˈpɔnt͡ʃkə]) are filled doughnuts found in Polish cuisine.

== Description ==
A pączek is a deep-fried piece of dough shaped into a flattened ball and filled with confiture or other sweet filling. Pączki are usually covered with powdered sugar, icing, glaze, or bits of dried orange zest. A small amount of grain alcohol (traditionally rectified spirit) is added to the dough before cooking; as it evaporates, it prevents the absorption of oil deep into the dough. Pączki are commonly thought of as fluffy but somewhat collapsed, with a bright stripe around them; these features are seen as evidence that the dough was fried in fresh oil.

Although they look like German berliners (bismarcks in North America) or jelly doughnuts, pączki are made from especially rich dough containing eggs, fats, sugar, yeast, and sometimes milk. They feature a variety of fruit and creme fillings and can be glazed, or covered with granulated or powdered sugar. Powidła (stewed plum jam) and wild rose petal jam are traditional fillings, but many others are used as well, including strawberry, Bavarian cream, blueberry, custard, raspberry, and apple.

Pączki have been known in Poland at least since the Middle Ages. Jędrzej Kitowicz wrote that during the reign of Augustus III, under the influence of French cooks who came to Poland, pączki dough was improved so that pączki became lighter, spongier, and more resilient.

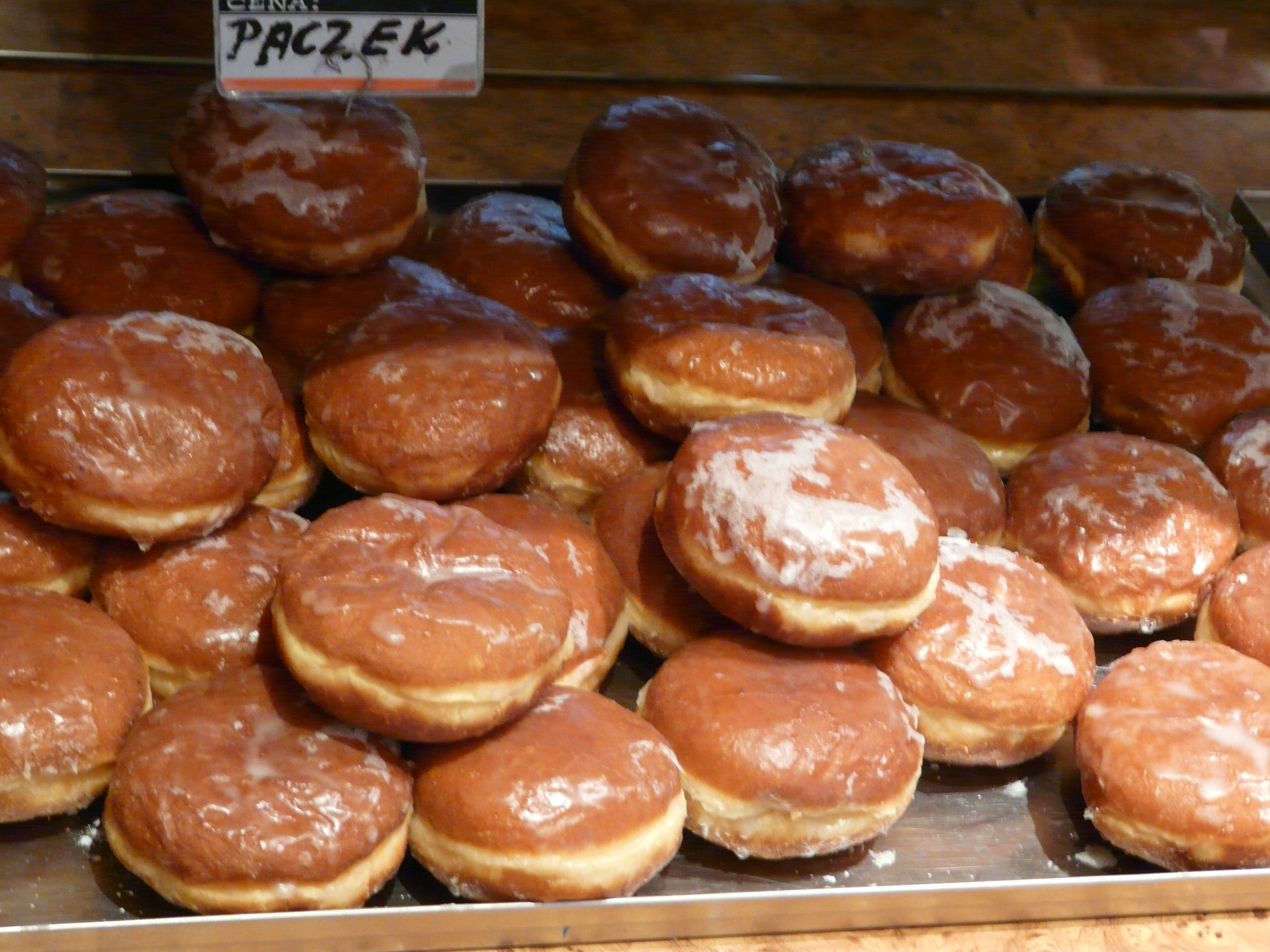
Pączki displayed for sale

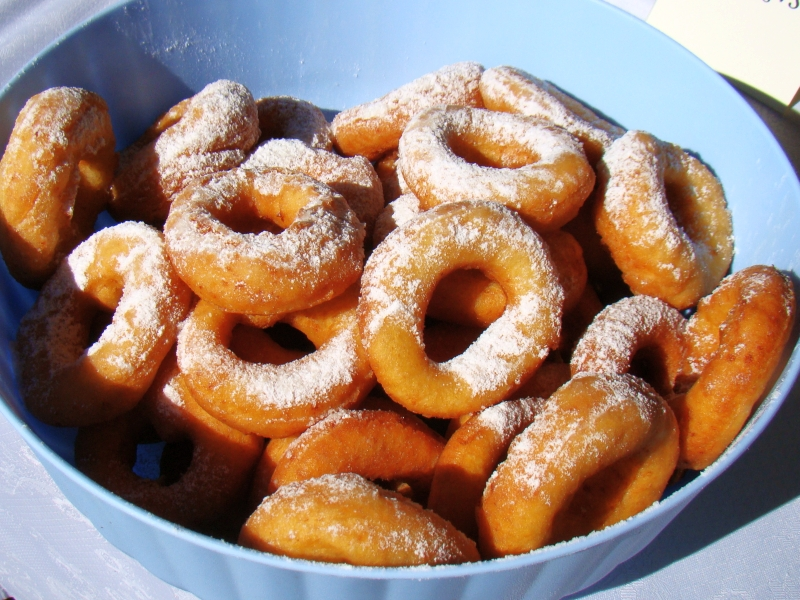
Traditional pączki serowe (curd-based pączki) or oponki

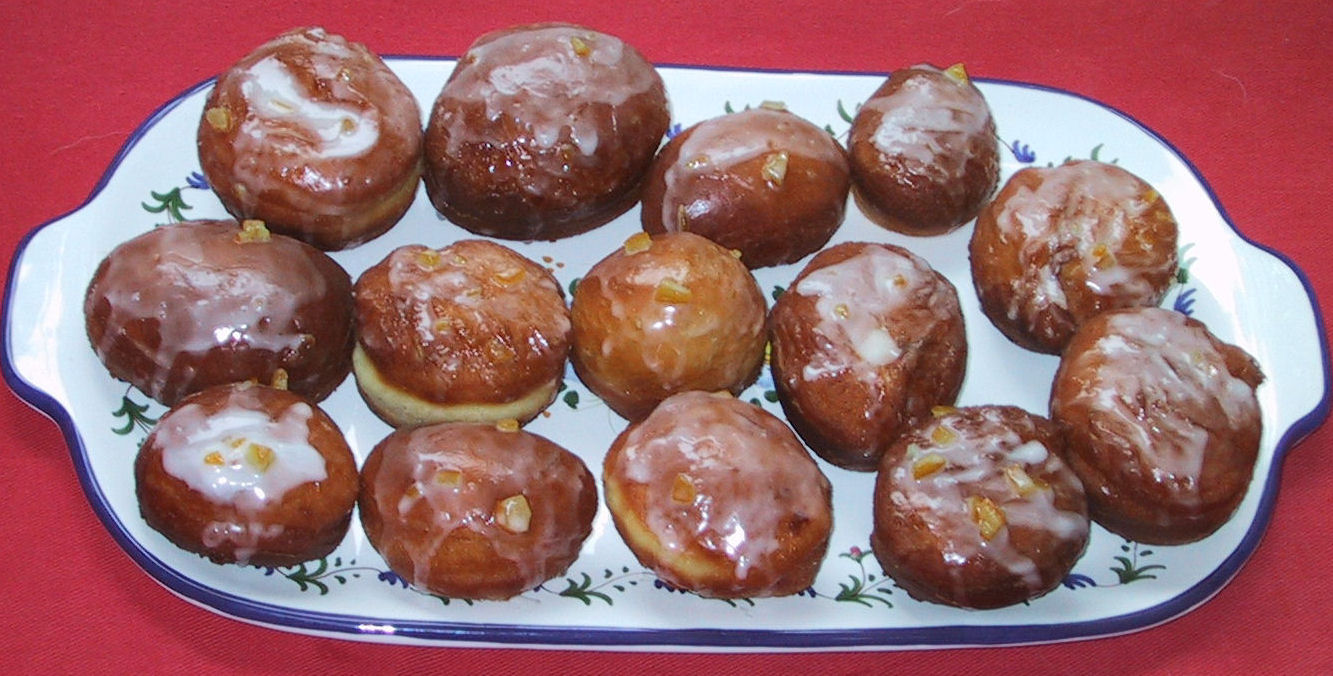
Home-made glazed pączki

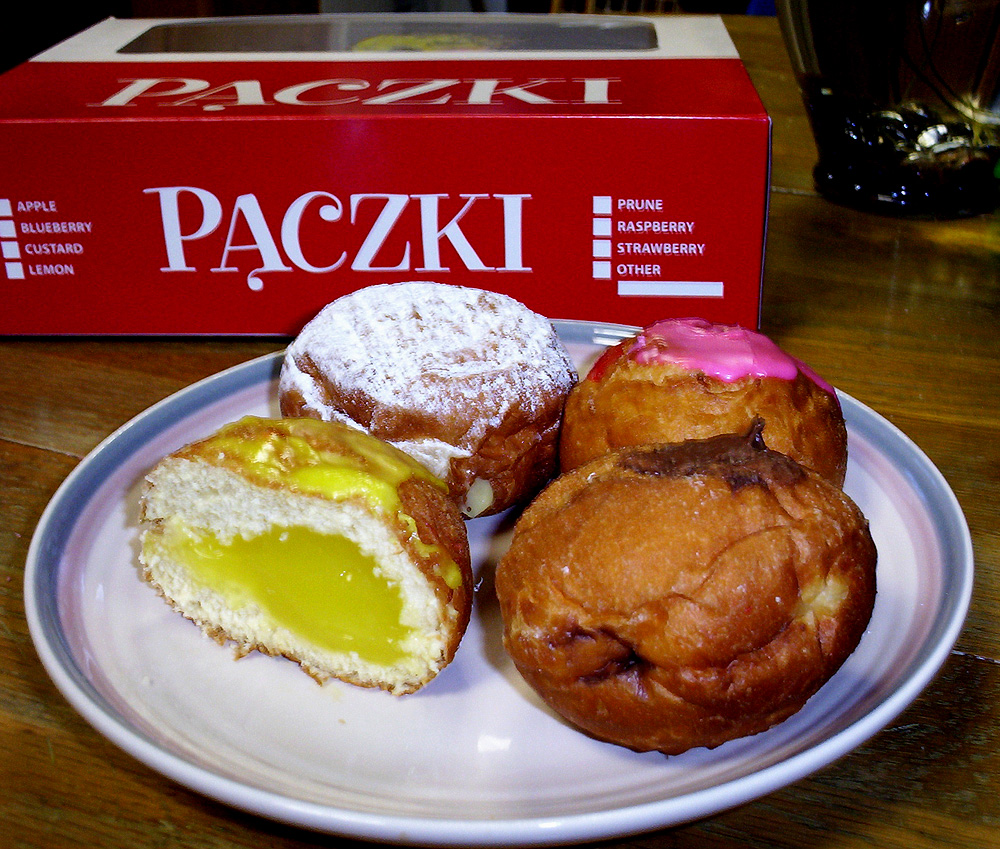
American-made pączki

== Etymology, spelling, and pronunciation ==
The Polish word pączek [ˈpɔ̃t͡ʂɛk] (plural: pączki [ˈpɔ̃t͡ʂkʲi]) is a diminutive of the Polish word pąk [ˈpɔŋk] "bud". The latter derives from Proto-Slavic *pǫkъ, which may have referred to anything that is round, bulging, and about to burst (compare Proto-Slavic *pǫknǫti "to swell, burst"), possibly of ultimately onomatopoeic origin.

Several other Slavic languages have borrowed from the original Polish, where the respective loanwords (ponchik, (Note: Russian: пончик.) ponchyk, (Note: Ukrainian: пончик, Belarusian: пончык.) or ponichka (Note: Bulgarian: поничка.)) refer to a similar ball-shaped pastry.

English has borrowed the plural form of the Polish word for both the singular and the plural, writing it as "paczki" (i.e., without the ogonek, the hook-shaped diacritic). English speakers typically pronounce it as /ˈpʊntʃki, ˈpʊnʃ-, ˈpʌntʃ-, ˈpɒntʃ-/. (Note: Respelling: PUUNCH-kee, PUUNSH-, PUNCH-, PONCH-.) Note that the English spelling should not be confused with the unrelated Polish word paczki [ˈpat͡ʂkʲi], which is the plural form of paczka [ˈpat͡ʂka], meaning "package" or "parcel".

== Pączki Day ==
Fat Thursday versus Fat Tuesday
Sunday	Monday	Tuesday	Wednesday	(Poland) Fat Thursday (Tłusty Czwartek)	Friday	Saturday
Sunday	Monday	(United States) (Canada) Fat Tuesday (Pączki Day)	Ash Wednesday	Thursday	Friday	Saturday
Carnival / Lent

In Poland, pączki are eaten especially on Fat Thursday (Tłusty Czwartek), the last Thursday prior to Ash Wednesday and the beginning of Lent. The traditional reason for making pączki was to use up all the lard, sugar, eggs and fruit in the house, because their consumption was forbidden by Christian fasting practices during the season of Lent.

In North America, particularly the large Polish communities of Chicago, Detroit, Milwaukee, and other large cities across the Midwest and Northeast, Paczki Day is celebrated annually by immigrants and locals alike. The date of this observance merges with that of pre-Lenten traditions of other immigrants (e.g., Pancake Day, Mardi Gras) on Fat Tuesday. With its sizable Polish population, Chicago celebrates the festival on both Fat Thursday and Fat Tuesday. Pączki are also often eaten on Casimir Pulaski Day. In Buffalo, Toledo, Cleveland, Detroit, Grand Rapids, St. Louis, South Bend, Louisville, and Windsor, Pączki Day is celebrated on Fat Tuesday.

In Hamtramck, Michigan, an enclave of Detroit, there is an annual Pączki Day (Shrove Tuesday) Parade, which has gained a devoted following. Throughout the Metro Detroit area, it is so widespread that many bakeries attract lines of customers for pączki on Pączki Day. In suburban Cleveland, Eastern European bakery Rudy's Strudel hosts a large indoor and outdoor Paczki Day party in conjunction with neighboring record store, The Current Year. It is called "the Mardi Gras of the Midwest".

In some areas, Pączki Day is celebrated with pączki-eating contests.

== See also ==
- List of doughnut varieties
- List of Polish desserts

== General and cited sources ==
- "American Heritage Dictionary of the English Language".
- Bańkowski, Andrzej, ed. (2000). Etymologiczny słownik języka polskiego [Polish etymological dictionary] (in Polish). Vol. 1. Wydawnictwo Naukowe PWN.
- Barber, Katherine, ed. (2004). The Canadian Oxford Dictionary (2nd ed.). Oxford University Press. doi:10.1093/acref/9780195418163.001.0001. ISBN 978-0-19-541816-3.
- Bizzarri, Amy, ed. (2016). Iconic Chicago Dishes, Drinks and Desserts. Charleston, SC: American Palata. ISBN 978-1-46713-551-1.
- Boldyrev, R. V. (2003). Melnichuk, O. S. (ed.). Etimologichnyi slovnyk ukrayinskoi movi Етимологічний словник української мови [Etymological Dictionary of Ukrainian Language] (in Ukrainian). Vol. 4. Kyiv: Naukova dumka. ISBN 966-00-0590-3.
- Bralczyk, Jerzy (2014). Jeść!!! [Let me eat!] (in Polish). BOSZ. ISBN 978-83-7576-218-1.
- Czerniecki, Stanisław (1682). Compendium ferculorum, albo Zebranie potraw [A Collection of Dishes] (in Polish). Kraków: Drukarnia Jerzego i Mikołaja Schedlów.
- Derksen, Rick (2008). Etymological Dictionary of the Slavic Inherited Lexicon (PDF). Leiden Indo-European Etymological Dictionary Series. Leiden; Boston: Brill. ISBN 978-90-04-15504-6. OCLC 179104910. Archived from the original on 31 October 2013.
- "Dictionary.com Unabridged". Random House.
- Doroszewski, Witold, ed. (1969). "Słownik Języka Polskiego" [Polish Dictionary] (in Polish). Warszawa: Państwowe Wydawnictwo Naukowe.
- Dumanowski, Jarosław; Jankowski, Rafał, eds. (2011). Moda bardzo dobra smażenia różnych konfektów [A Very Good Way of Frying Various Confections]. Monumenta Poloniae Culinaria (in Polish). Vol. 2. Warszawa: Muzeum Pałac w Wilanowie. ISBN 978-83-60959-18-3.
- Dumanowski, Jarosław (2016). "Pączki z przeszłości, czyli tłusty czwartek historycznie" [Pączki of the past, or Fat Thursday in history]. naTemat.pl.
- Edge, John T., ed. (2006). Donuts: An American Passion. New York: G.P. Putnam's Sons. ISBN 978-1-440-62864-1.
- Georgiev, Vladimir Ivanov (1999). Blgarski etimologichen rechnik Български етимологичен речник [Bulgarian Etymological Dictionary] (in Bulgarian). Vol. 1. Marin Drinov. ISBN 978-95-4430-315-0.
- Kitowicz, Jędrzej (1840). Opis obyczajów i zwyczajów za panowania Augusta III [Description of customs and habits under Augustus III] (in Polish). Poznań: Edward Raczyński.
- Kuroń, Maciej (2004). Kuchnia polska: Kuchnia Rzeczypospolitej wielu narodów [Polish Cuisine: Cuisine of a Commonwealth of Many Nations] (in Polish). Czarna Owca. ISBN 83-89763-25-7.
- Lemnis, Maria; Vitry, Henryk (1979). W staropolskiej kuchni i przy polskim stole [Old Polish Traditions in the Kitchen and at the Table] (in Polish). Warszawa: Interpress.
- "Lista produktów tradycyjnych" [List of traditional products] (in Polish). Ministerstwo Rolnictwa i Rozwoju Wsi. Archived from the original on 2018-05-24.
- Łozińska, Maja; Łoziński, Jan (2013). Historia polskiego smaku: kuchnia, stół, obyczaje [History of the Polish Taste: Kitchen, Table, Customs] (in Polish). Warszawa: Wydawnictwo Naukowe PWN. ISBN 978-83-7705-269-3.
- Mish, Frederick C. (2004). Merriam-Webster's Collegiate Dictionary (11th ed.).
- Neilson, William Allan; Knott, Thomas A.; Carhart, Paul W. (1947) [1934]. Webster's New International Dictionary (2nd ed.).
- Strybel, Robert; Strybel, Maria (2005) [1993]. Polish Heritage Cookery. New York: Hippocrene Books. ISBN 0-7818-1124-4.
- Szymula, Elzbieta (2012). "Polish Diet". In Thaker, Aruna; Barton, Arlene (eds.). Multicultural Handbook of Food, Nutrition and Dietetics. Wiley-Blackwell. pp. 277–295. ISBN 978-1-4051-7358-2.
- Szymanderska, Hanna (2010). Kuchnia polska: Potrawy regionalne [Polish Cuisine: Regional Dishes] (in Polish). Warszawa: Świat Książki. ISBN 978-83-7799-631-7.
- Ushakov, Dmitry Nikolayevich (1940). "Tolkovy slovar russkogo yazyka" Толковый словарь русского языка [Explanatory Dictionary of the Russian Language]. Akademik (in Russian). Moskva: Sovetskaya entsiklopediya.
- Żmigrodzki, Piotr (ed.). "Wielki Słownik Języka Polskiego" [The Great Polish Dictionary] (in Polish). Instytut Języka Polskiego PAN.
