= Berliner (doughnut) =

German jam doughnut

Krapfen
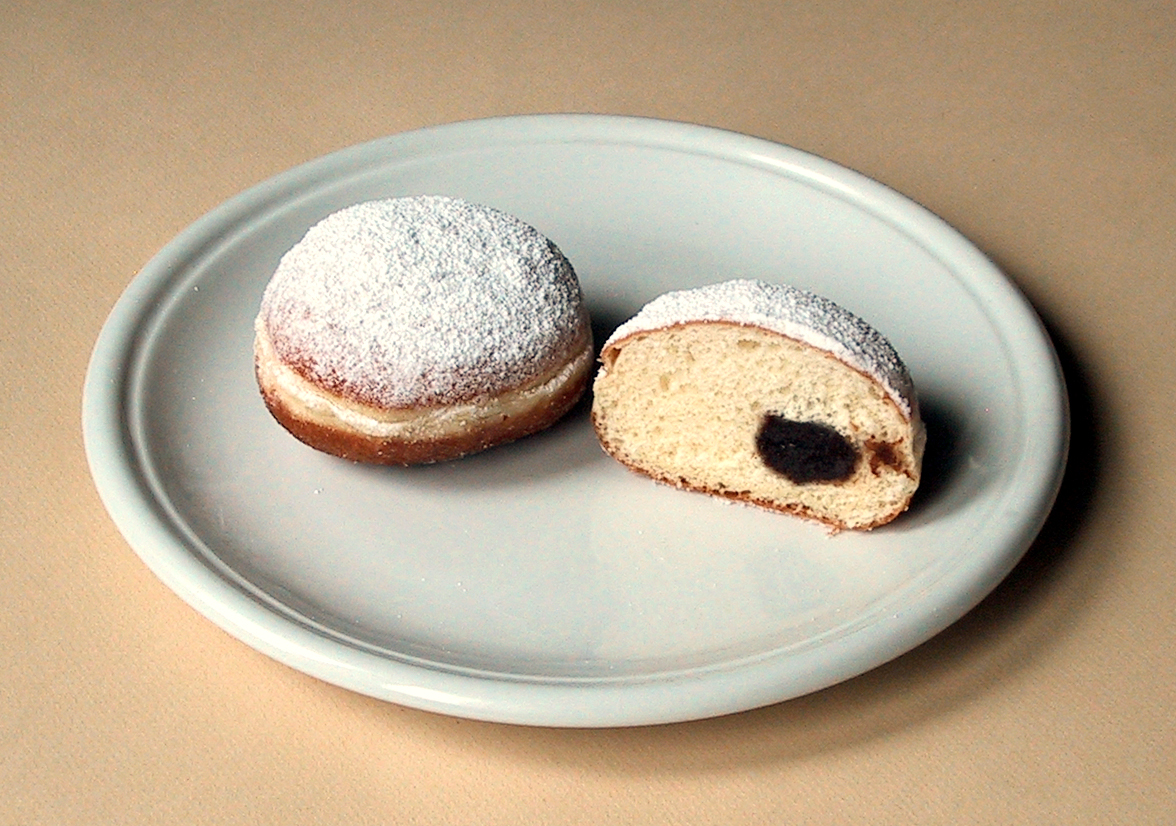
- Krapfen with plum jam filling
- Alternative names: Krapfen, Kreppel, Bismarck, Berliner
- Type: Jelly doughnut
- Place of origin: Germany
- Main ingredients: Yeast dough, jam, icing, powdered sugar or sugar
- Variations: Custard

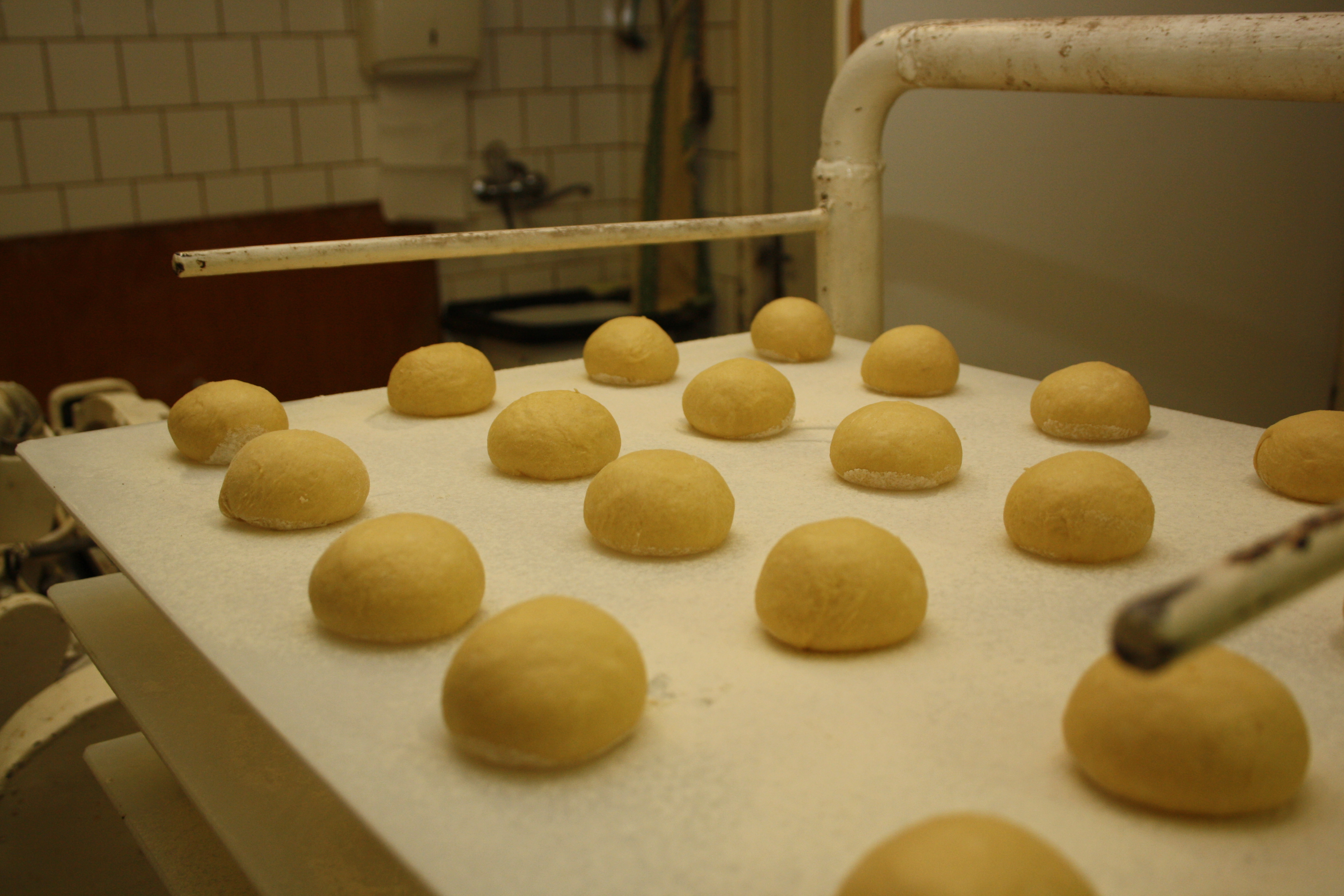
Krapfen in preparation

A Berliner or Krapfen is a German jam doughnut with no central hole, made from sweet yeast dough fried in lard or cooking oil, with a jam filling, and usually covered in powdered sugar or glazed.

== History ==
Sugar was very costly until the 16th century, and early doughnuts were usually stuffed with savory fillings like cheese, meat and mushroom. When imports from Caribbean sugar plantations made sugar more affordable, fruit preserves gained in popularity. In 1485, the first German-language cookbook to be published in printed form Kuechenmeisterei was published in Nuremberg and remained in print at least until 1674 with 20 editions (it was later translated into Polish in 1532). It was one of the first cookbooks printed using the Gutenberg press and contains the first known recipe for a jelly doughnut, called Gefüllte Krapfen made with jam-filled yeasted bread dough deep-fried in lard. It is unknown whether this innovation was the author's own or simply a record of an existing practice.

== Preparation ==
The yeast dough contains a good deal of eggs, milk and butter. For the classical Berliner made in Berlin the dough is rolled into a ball, deep-fried in lard, whereby the distinctive bright bulge occurs, and then filled with jam. The filling is related to the topping: for plum-butter, powdered sugar; for raspberry, strawberry and cherry jam, sugar; for all other fillings, sugar icing, sometimes flavoured with rum. Today the filling usually is injected with a large syringe or pastry bag after the dough is fried in one piece.

Today, Berliners can be purchased throughout the year, though they were traditionally eaten to celebrate on New Year's Eve (Silvester) as well as the carnival holidays (Rosenmontag and Fat Tuesday). A common German practical joke is to secretly fill some Krapfen with mustard instead of jam, especially on April Fool's Day, and serve them together with regular Krapfen without telling anyone.

== Names ==
The jelly-filled Krapfen were called Berliners in the 1800s, based on the legend of a patriotic baker from Berlin who became a regimental baker after he was deemed unfit for combat by the Prussian Army. When the army was in the field, he "baked" the doughnuts the old-fashioned way, by frying them over an open fire. According to the tale, the soldiers called the pastry Berliner after the baker's hometown.

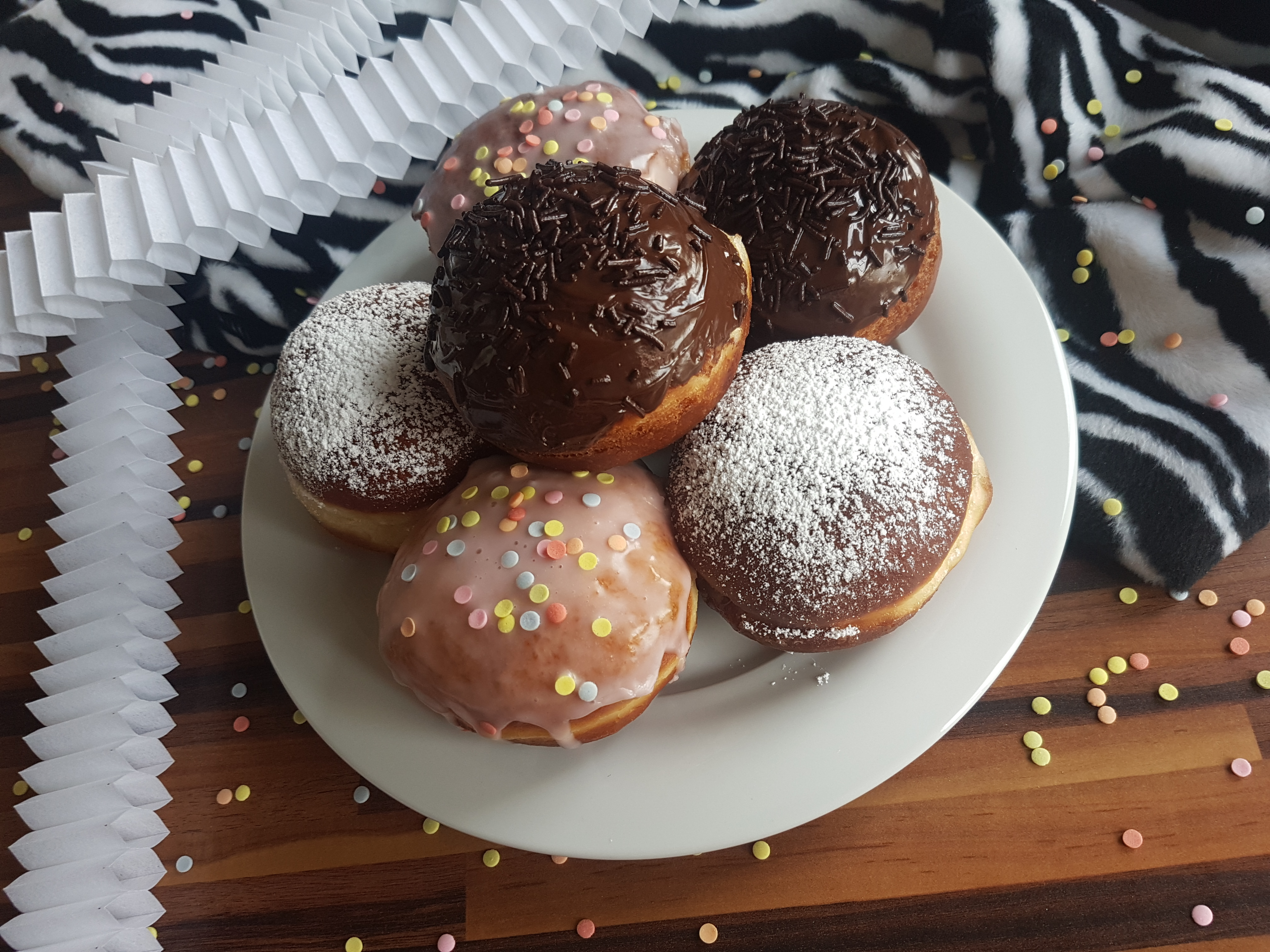
Colorfully decorated Krapfen doughnuts with different fillings often eaten at the carnival

The term Bismarcken (for Otto von Bismarck) came into use by the end of the 19th century. Immigrants from Central Europe settled in the United States in large numbers during the 19th century, and jelly doughnuts are called "bismarcks" or "bismarks" in some parts of the Midwestern United States, Boston, and Alberta and Saskatchewan in Canada.

The terminology used to refer to this delicacy differs greatly in various areas of modern Germany. While called Berliner Ballen or simply Berliner in northern and western Germany, as well as in Switzerland, the Berliners themselves and residents of Brandenburg, Western Pomerania, Saxony-Anhalt and Saxony know them as Pfannkuchen, which translates literally and wrongly to "pancakes". A pancake in the rest of Germany is indeed a Pfannkuchen, in Austria and sometimes Southern Germany called Palatschinken. The people of Berlin call their pancakes Eierkuchen, which translates to "egg cakes".

In parts of southern and central Germany (Bavaria), as well as in much of Austria, they are a variety of Krapfen (derived from Old High German kraffo and furthermore related to Gothic language krappa), sometimes called Fastnachtskrapfen or Faschingskrapfen to distinguish them from Bauernkrapfen. In Hesse they are referred to as Kräppel or Kreppel. Residents of the Palatinate call them also Kreppel or Fastnachtsküchelchen ("little carnival cakes"), hence the English term for a pastry called "Fasnacht"; further south, the Swabians use the equivalent term in their distinctive dialect: Fasnetskiachla. In South Tyrol, Triveneto and other parts of northern Italy, the food is called kraffen or krapfen, while in the southern parts it can be referred as bomba or bombolone.

In Slovenia, it is krof; in Portugal it is "bola de Berlim" (Berlin ball) or malasada (from "mal-assada" = "badly-baked"); in Croatia, it is krafne; while in Bosnia and Herzegovina and Serbia, it is called krofne. In Poland, they are known as pączki, in Ukraine, as "pampushky"; and in the Czech Republic as kobliha. In Hungary, it is called bécsi fánk, meaning Viennese doughnut, as it was transited by Austria to the Hungarian kitchen. The pastry is called Berlinerbol in the Netherlands and Suriname, Berlijnse bol and boule de Berlin in Belgium, hillomunkki or (glazed) berliininmunkki or piispanmunkki in Finland, berlinerbolle in Norway, sufganiyot in Israel, Berlínarbollur in Iceland, šiška in Slovakia, and gogoși in Romania. In Denmark, it is called Berliner. In Turkey, they are known as Alman Pastası (German Pie). All of these are similar preparations.

In Argentina, the pastries are called bolas de fraile (lit. 'friar balls'); the reason for this relates to the anarchist bakers' union Sociedad Cosmopolita de Resistencia y Colocación de Obreros Panaderos.

== International variations ==
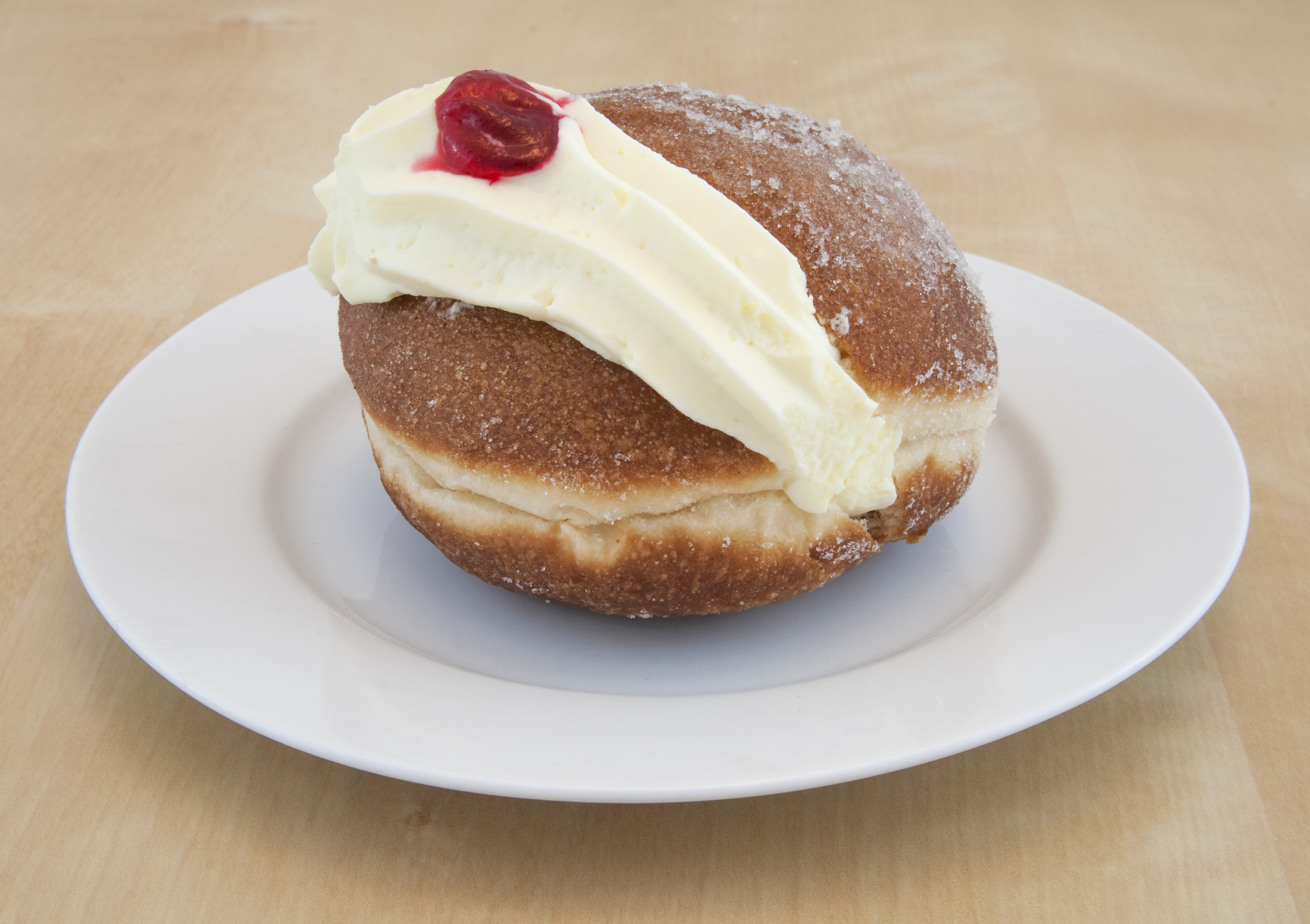
The Kitchener bun is a Berliner cut on the side for the filling of jam and cream.

In English-speaking countries, Berliners are a type of doughnut usually filled with jam, jelly, custard, or whipped cream. In South Australia, however, the Kitchener bun is a Berliner cut on the side for the filling of jam and cream.

In Israel, a version of the pastry called sufganiyah (Hebrew: סופגנייה) is traditionally consumed during the Jewish holiday of Hanukkah.

In Southeast Europe, they are called Krofne, Krafne or Krofi. They are the same size and often filled with jam as well, but unlike its German counterpart, chocolate fillings are also very common there. They are not to be confused with "princes krofne" which is a Serbo-Croatian name for profiteroles.

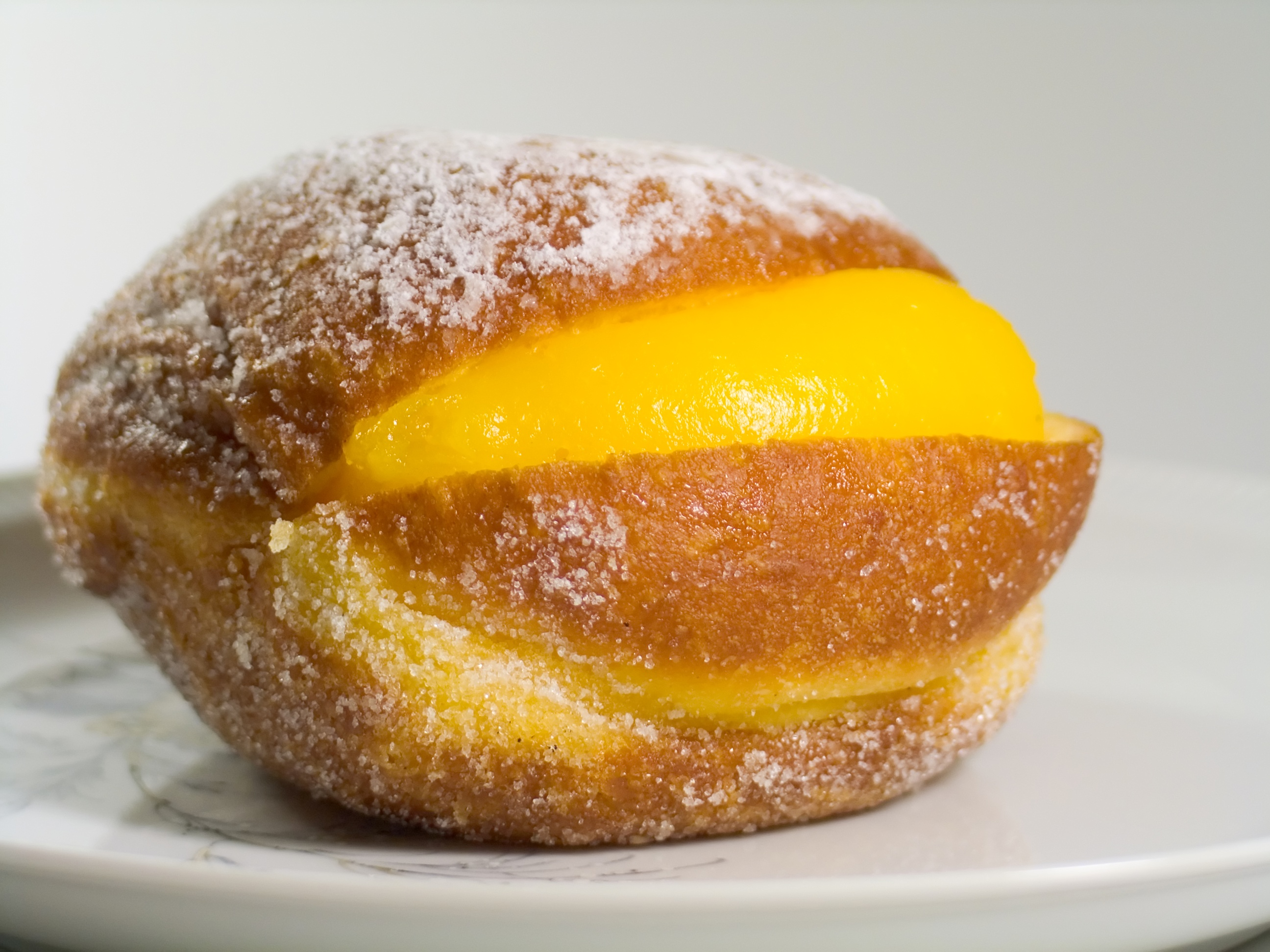
Bola de Berlim from Portugal

In Portugal, Berliners are slightly bigger than their German counterparts. They are known as bolas de Berlim (lit. Berlin ball), and the filling is frequently an egg-yolk-based yellow cream called creme pasteleiro (lit. confectioner's cream). The filling is inserted after a half-length cut and is always visible. Regular sugar is used to sprinkle it. They can be found in almost every pastry shop in the country. It's a typical beach food, provided by street vendors.

Such versions are also found in Latin American countries with German descended populations, such as in Mexico (berlinesas), Chile (Berlín), Paraguay (bollo), Venezuela (bomba), Uruguay and Argentina (bola de fraile or suspiro de monja or berlinesa), where it is filled not only with custard (called "crema pastelera"), but also with jam (especially red ones), dulce de leche, or manjar blanco.

In Brazil, they are known as sonho (dream) and are also widely consumed in the country. Their commercialization began in the 1920s in bakeries in São Paulo, with the use of leftover bread dough. They are presented filled, usually with pastry cream, chocolate, or dulce de leche.

In Finland, berliininmunkki (Berlin doughnut) is a commonly consumed pastry, although unlike a traditional Berliner, this variant has pink caramel colored frosting on top as opposed to regular or powdered sugar.

In Tromsø, Norway, Berliners are eaten to celebrate the return of the sun at the end of the polar night on January 21. They are called a solbolle (lit. sun bun), and around 60,000 Berliners, roughly one per capita, are consumed in Tromsø on this day. In recent years, bakeries have also made a special type of Berliner called a mørketidsbolle (lit. polar night bun), with a yellow custard filing and a dark chocolate covering (to symbolize darkness covering the sun). This Berliner is eaten in the build up to and during the polar night period, from the end of the September until the start of Christmas.

In Italy they are known as Krapfen and are usually filled with custard. They are more common in northern Italy, as it was historically part of the Austrian Empire which helped spreading the recipe. Krapfen are commonly associated with the region of Trentino-South Tyrol where the German-speaking population still shares lots of culinary traditions with Tyrol and Austria in general.

Portuguese-style Malasadas are also very popular in Hawaii. In 1878, Portuguese laborers from Madeira and the Azores went to Hawaii to work in the plantations. These immigrants brought their traditional foods with them, including a fried dough pastry called "malasada." Today, there are numerous bakeries in the Hawaiian islands specializing in malasadas.

Mardi Gras ("Fat Tuesday"), the day before Lent, is Malasada Day in Hawaii. Being predominantly Catholic, Portuguese immigrants would need to use up all their butter and sugar prior to Lent. They did so by making large batches of malasadas, which they would subsequently share with friends from all the other ethnic groups in the plantation camps.

== John F. Kennedy urban legend ==
John F. Kennedy's words "Ich bin ein Berliner" are standard German for "I am a Berliner", meaning a person from Berlin. Mentioned in Len Deighton's 1983 novel Berlin Game, an urban legend has it that due to his use of the indefinite article ein, Berliner is translated as "jelly doughnut", and that the population of Berlin was amused by the supposed mistake. This is incorrect, insofar as when leaving out ein, the meaning only changes slightly (compare I am Berliner and I am a Berliner). The normal convention when stating a nationality or, for instance, saying one is from Berlin, would be to leave out the indefinite article ein. However, Kennedy used the indefinite article here correctly to emphasize his relation to Berlin. Additionally, the word Berliner is not used in Berlin to refer to the Berliner Pfannkuchen. These are simply called Pfannkuchen there and therefore no Berliner would mistake Berliner for a doughnut. Throughout the 1980s, the legend was spread even by reputable media like The New York Times, The Guardian, BBC and NBC.

== See also ==
- Carnival in Germany, Switzerland and Austria
- List of doughnut varieties
- List of German desserts
- Pączki, traditional Polish pastries
