= Jelly doughnut =

Doughnut with a fruit preserve filling

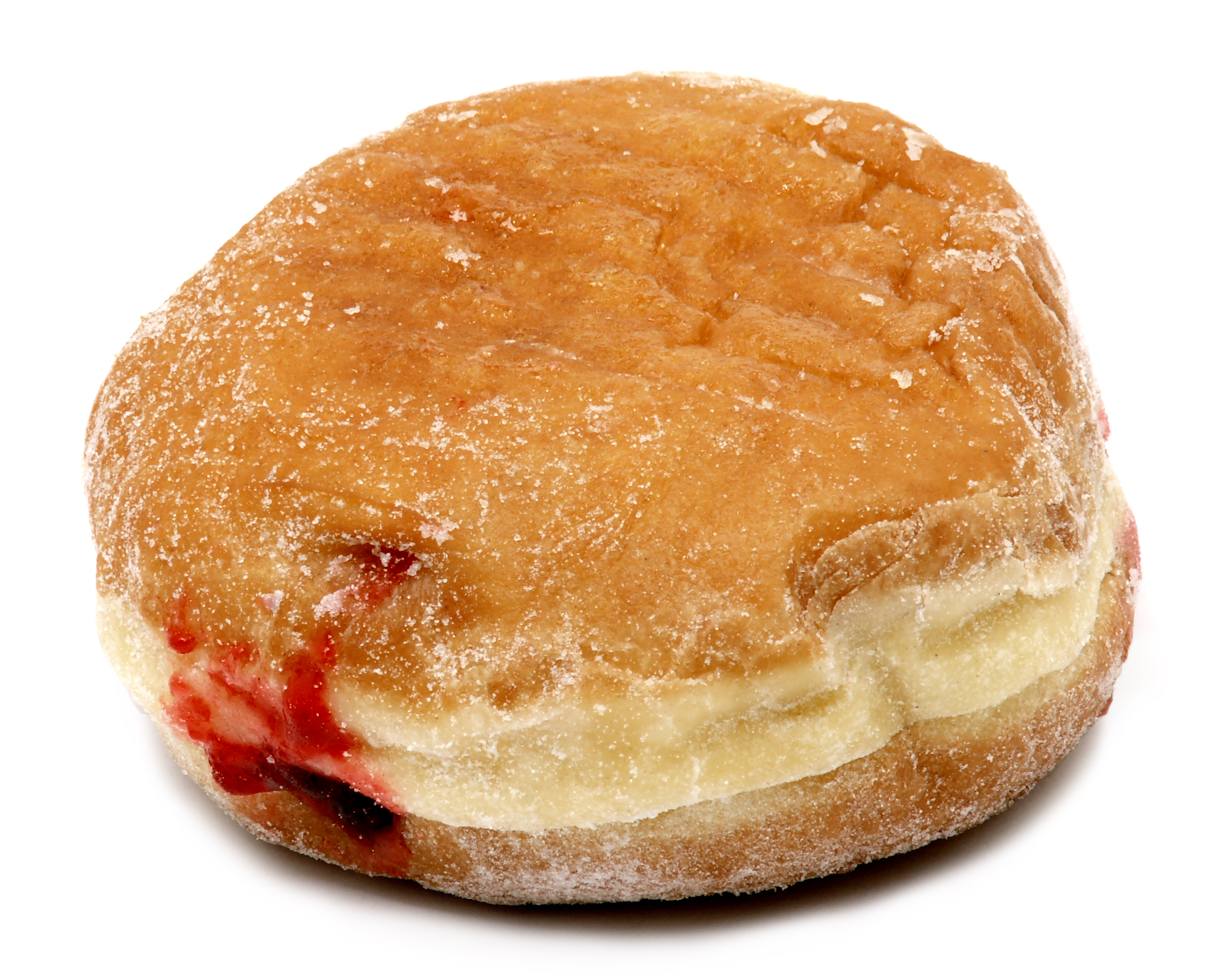
- Alternative names: Jam doughnut
- Type: Doughnut
- Place of origin: Germany
- Variations: Krapfen, sufganiyot, pączki

A jelly or jam doughnut is a doughnut containing a fruit preserve filling. Originating in Germany where they are commonly referred to as krapfen (formally faschingskrapfen), jelly doughnuts became more common in Europe by the 18th-century. The food was adapted by Israelis, where it is known as sufganiyot, and Poles, where it is known as pączki. A popular breakfast item in the United States, its first mention there dates to late 19th-century. It is also a popular carnival food. There are several variations, such as jelly doughnut pudding, cake, popsicle, and balls.

== Description ==
Sufganiyot is usually made with dry yeast, milk, water, flour, eggs, butter, sugar, salt, oil, and jelly.

Jelly doughnut balls is a food made by cutting out the doughnuts, which can be made according the recipe for raised doughnuts. In Danish, they are known as aebleskiver. There are also several other variations, including pudding, cake, and popsicle.

== History ==
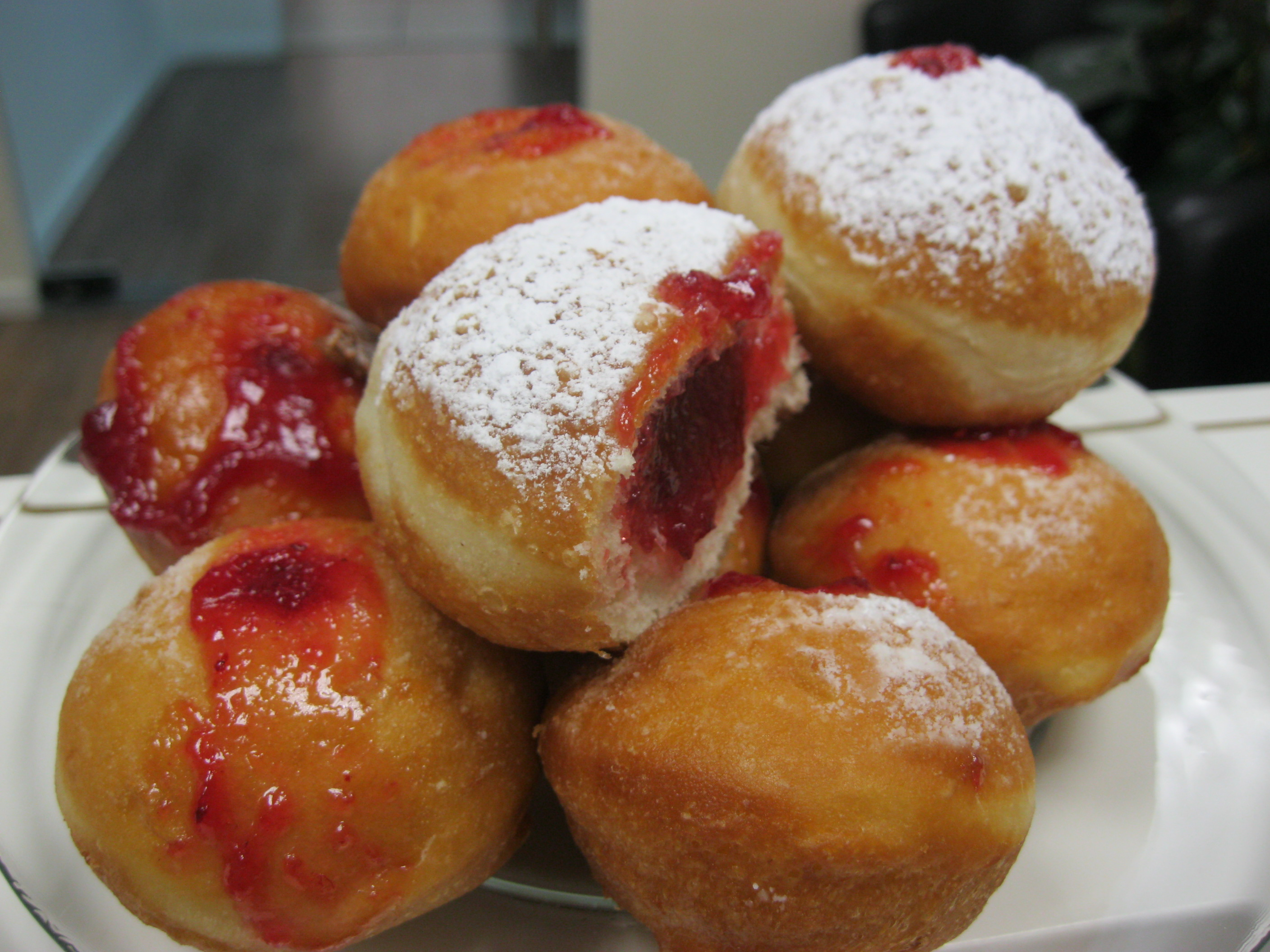
Sufganiyot

The first record of a jelly doughnut dates to the 13th-century epic Parzival, while it is also mentioned in the German cookbook Das Buoch von guoter Spise in the 14th-century, featuring four fillings. There, it is known as krapfen. By the 18th-century, jelly doughnuts were common in Europe, but were considered expensive due to the high cost of sugar. In 1815, the attendees of the Congress of Vienna were supplied with around 10 million jelly doughnuts. Faschingskrapfen is also used as a German word for jelly doughnuts, as well as Berliner Pfannkuchen. Food historian Andrew F. Smith wrote that it is hard to tell who invented doughnuts, as they overlap between German and Scandinavian cuisines. In Swedish, jelly doughnuts are known as Berliner kransen.

Although popular in the Central Europe, the doughnut was also adapted by Israelis for Hanukkah, where it is known as sufganiyot (or sufganiyah) and defined as a jelly doughnut rolled in sugar. The recipe was made by Jewish Central European settlers in the 1920s, when Histadrut encouraged Israelis to replace latkes, which are potato pancakes, with sufganiyot. In the modern period, sufganiyot is also sometimes filled with foie gras or dulce de leche. Sufganiya is a Hebrew word that comes from the Greek sufgan, which means "puffed and fried" Taiglach.

Jelly doughnuts are popular in the United States, such as in Detroit, where the Polish pączki can be found, which is similar to a jelly doughnut. The food can be traced in the country to the late 19th-century, where it was first mentioned in a cookbook for German-speaking Americans in Milwaukee, featuring several doughnut recipes, including the jolly doughnuts. It was later mentioned in 1932, when a New York City food and drink company advertised "whole wheat or jelly doughnuts" on its breakfast menu. In the United States, jelly doughnuts are filled with jellies, jams, custards, and poppy seeds. Sufganiyot, originally from Israel, is also popular among Jewish Americans.

After World War II, jelly doughnuts were introduced to Melbourne, Australia.

== Modern consumption ==
Jelly doughnut is a popular carnival food, such as in Transylvania and Tyrol. Pączkis are also eaten during carnivals before Lent. Jelly doughnuts are also popular in Vienna, while in Trieste, serving a jelly doughnut is considered a "point of honor".

In the United States, it is often eaten as a breakfast food. It is sold out of bakeries and major donut chains, such as Dunkin' Donuts and Krispy Kreme.

== In culture ==
American painters Emily Eveleth and Lee Price have depicted the food in their works. In Eveleth's work, the doughnut features rich cherry-red filling, but is also in a viscous, ominous physical form. Author Darra Goldstein wrote that this creates the feeling of "disgust and anxiety", something that is present in the modern period regarding sweets. Price titled his work "Jelly Doughnuts", depicting women who eat doughnuts, cakes, ice cream, and junk food.

== See also ==
- List of doughnut varieties
- List of stuffed dishes
- Quesito
- Sata andagi

== Sources ==
- Deutsch, Jonathan; Saks, Rachel D. (2008). Jewish American Food Culture. Food Cultures in America. Westport, Connecticut: Bloomsbury Publishing. ISBN 978-0-313-34320-9.
- F. Smith, Andrew, ed. (2013). The Oxford Encyclopedia of Food and Drink in America. Vol. 2 (2 ed.). New York: Oxford University Press. ISBN 978-0-19-973496-2.
- Fehribach, Paul (2023). Midwestern Food: A Chef's Guide to the Surprising History of a Great American Cuisine, with More Than 100 Tasty Recipes. Chicago, Illinois: University of Chicago Press. ISBN 978-0-226-81949-5.
- Field, Carol (1990). Celebrating Italy. New York: W. Morrow & Co. ISBN 978-0-688-07093-9.
- Flexner, Marion W. (1989) [1949]. Out of Kentucky Kitchens. Lexington, Kentucky: University Press of Kentucky. ISBN 978-0-8131-1712-6.
- Goldstein, Darra (1996). The Vegetarian Hearth: Recipes and Reflections for the Cold Season. New York: HarperColins Publishers. ISBN 978-0-06-018760-6.
- Goldstein, Darra, ed. (2015). The Oxford Companion to Sugar and Sweets. Oxford, Oxfordshire & New York: Oxford University Press. ISBN 978-0-19-931339-6.
- Krondl, Michael (2011). Sweet Invention: A History of Dessert. Chicago, Illinois: Chicago Review Press. ISBN 978-1-55652-954-2.
- Matson, Madeline (1994). Food in Missouri: A Cultural Stew. Columbia, Missouri: University of Missouri Press. ISBN 978-0-8262-0960-3.
- Mullins, Paul R. (2008). Glazed America: A History of the Doughnut. Gainesville, Florida: University Press of Florida. ISBN 978-0-8130-3238-2.
- Root, Waverley Lewis; De Rochemont, Richard (1976). Eating in America: A History. New York: Morrow. ISBN 978-0-688-03096-4.
- Roufs, Timothy; Roufs, Kathleen (2014). Sweet Treats Around the World: An Encyclopedia of Food and Culture. Santa Barbara, California: ABC-CLIO. ISBN 978-1-61069-220-5.
