= Powdered sugar =

Fine sugar with an anti-caking agent

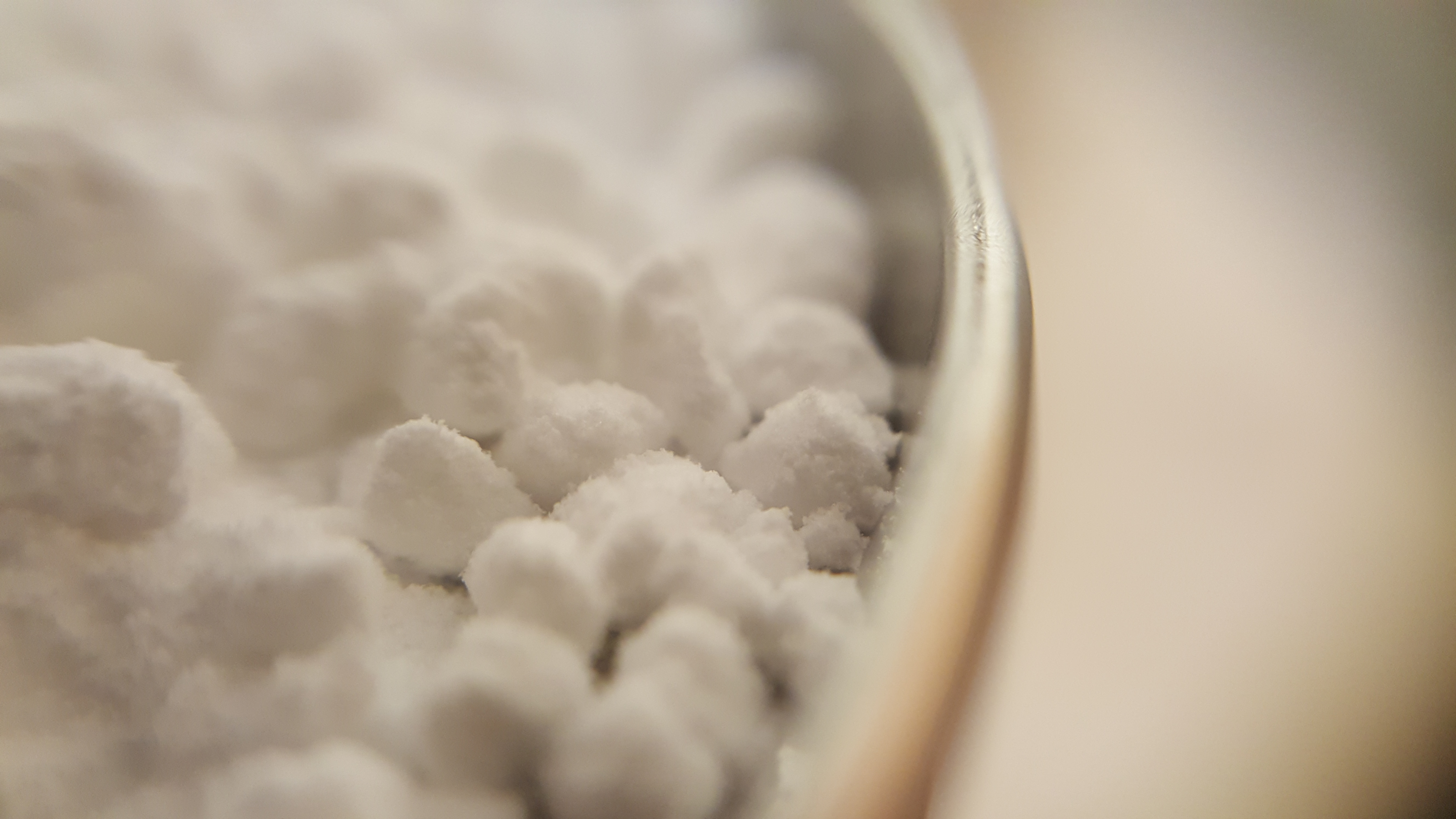
Closeup of unsifted powdered sugar

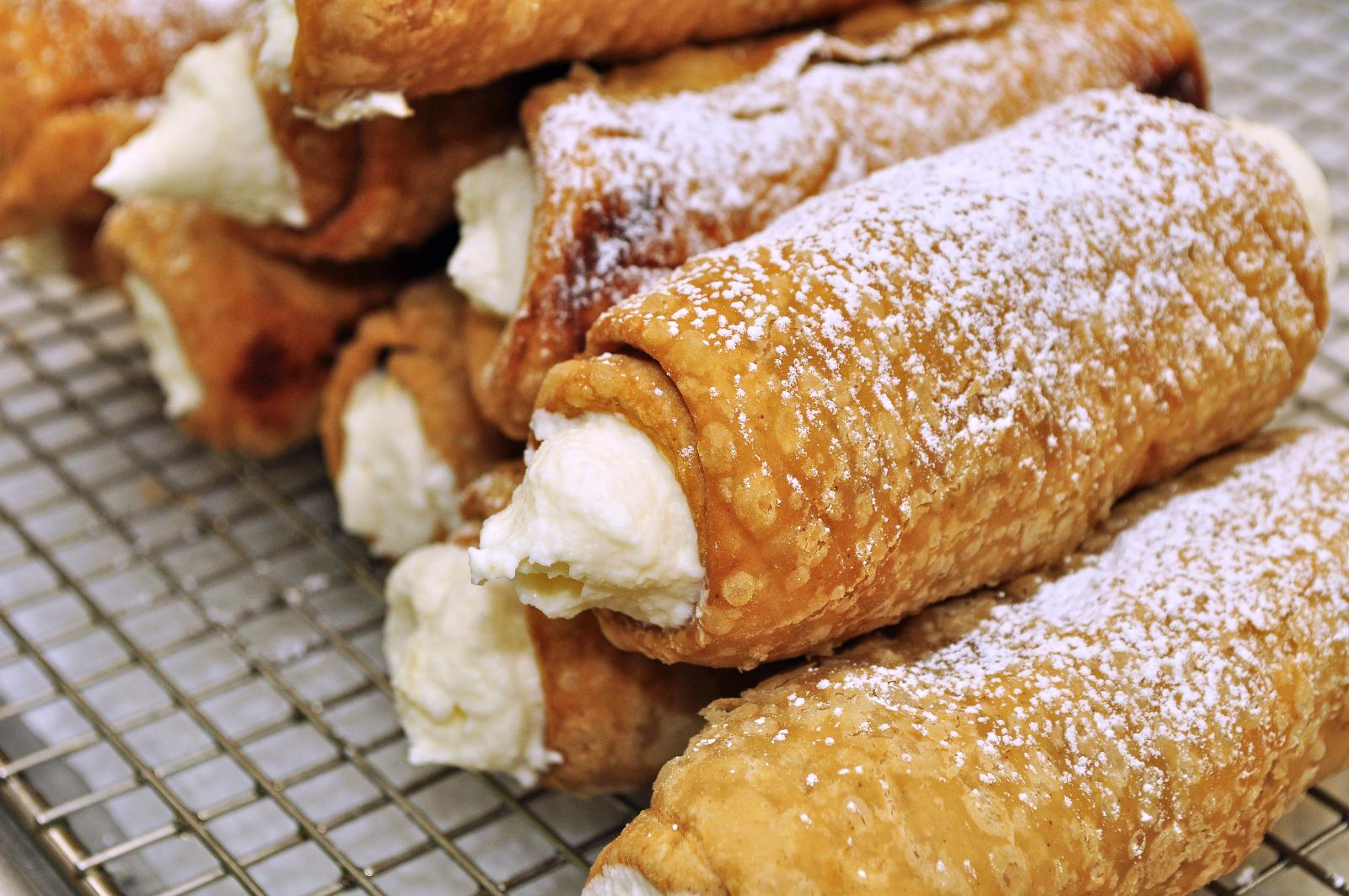
Powdered sugar on cannoli

Powdered sugar, also called confectioners' sugar and icing sugar, is a finely ground sugar produced by milling granulated sugar into a powdered state. It usually contains between 2% and 5% of an anti-caking agent—such as corn starch, potato starch or tricalcium phosphate—to absorb moisture, prevent clumping, and improve flow. Although most often produced in a factory, a proxy for powdered sugar can be made by processing ordinary granulated sugar in a coffee grinder, or by crushing it by hand in a mortar and pestle.

== Use ==
Powdered sugar is used in industrial food production when a quick-dissolving sugar is required. Home cooks use it principally to make icing or frosting and other cake decorations.

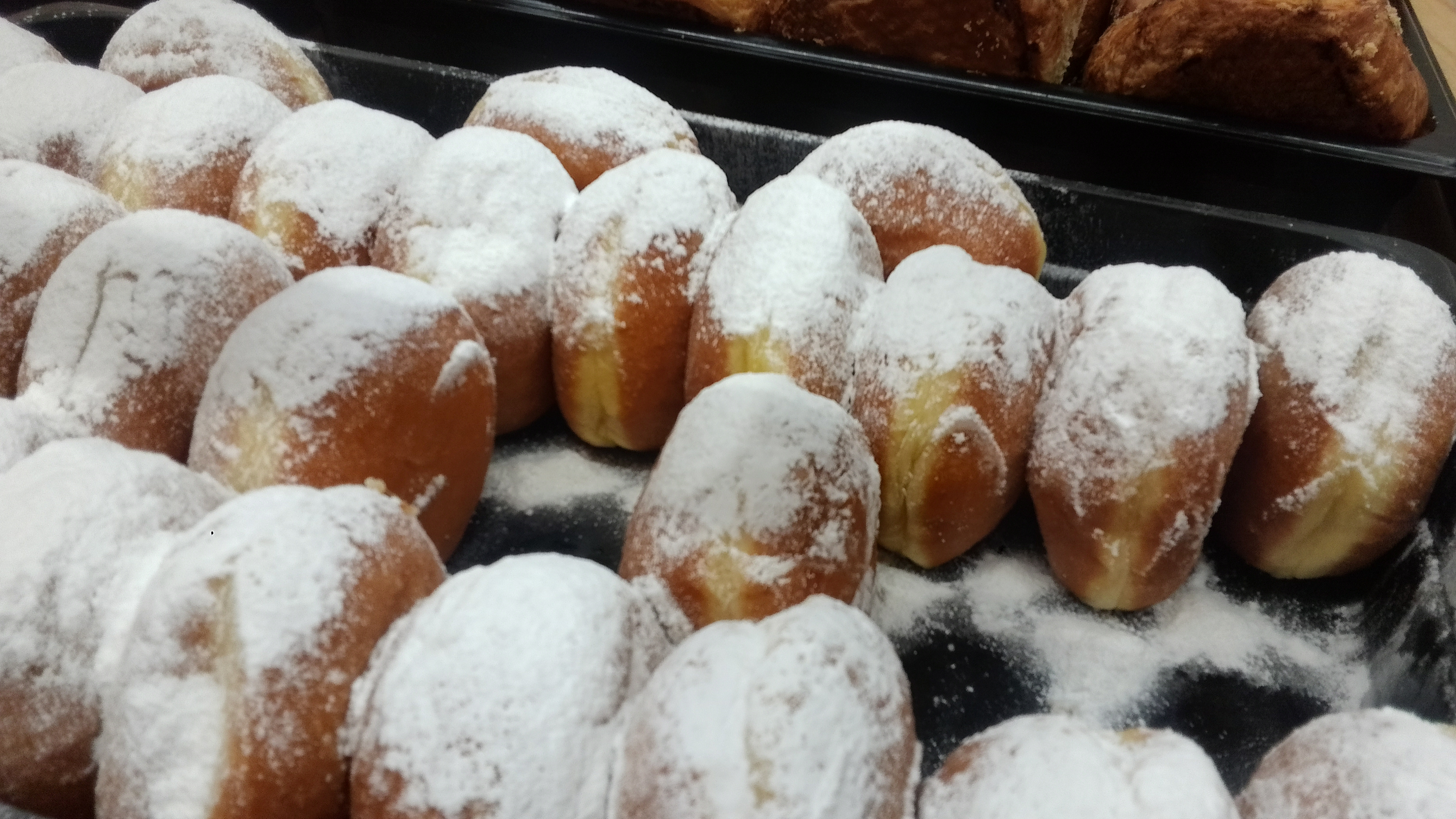
Powdered sugar on buns

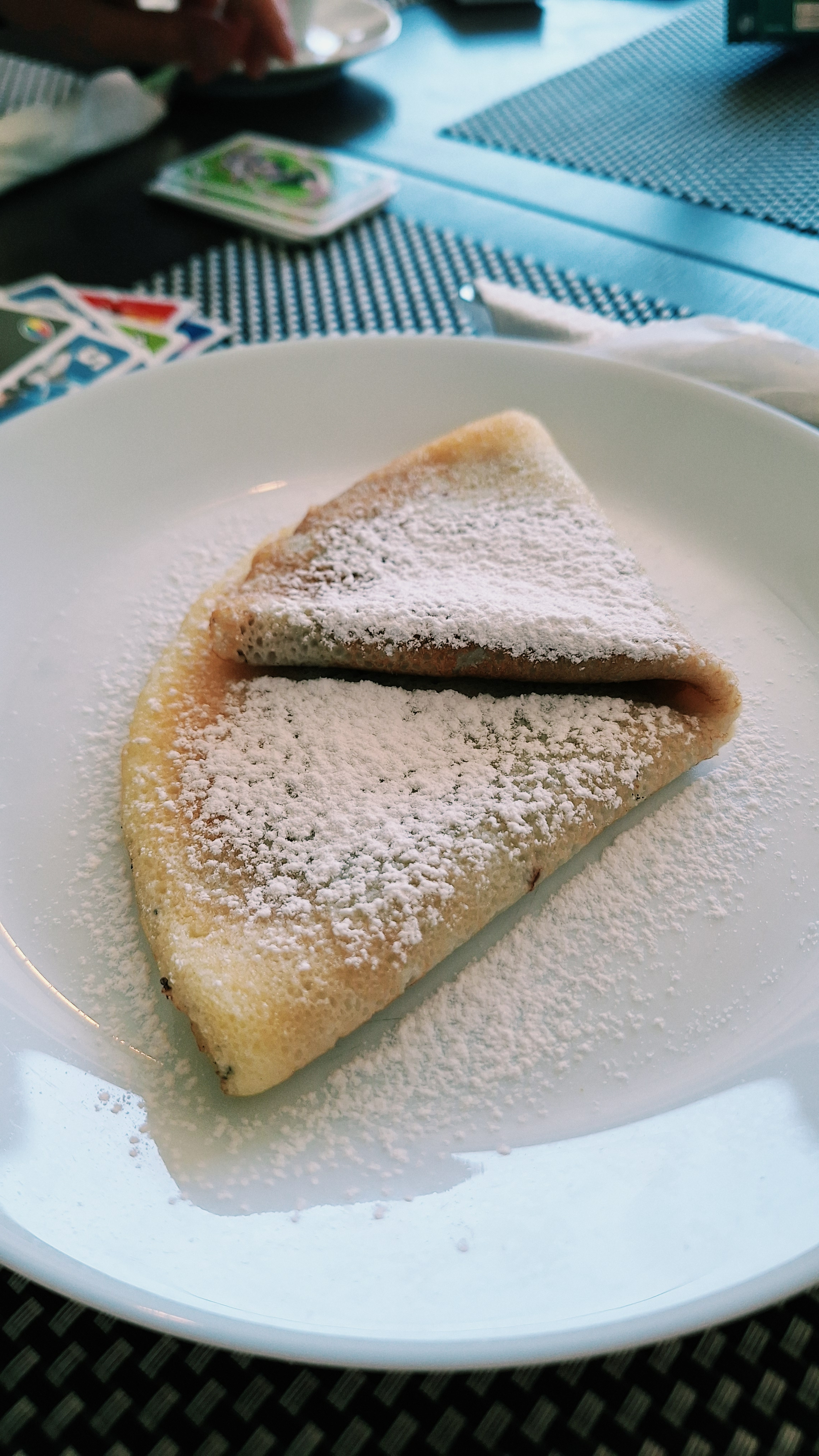
Palacinke, Croatian pancakes, served with powdered sugar in Zagreb, Croatia

Powdered sugar is available in varying degrees of fineness, most commonly XXX, XXXX, and 10X: the greater the number of Xs, the finer the particles. The most commonly used powdered sugars are those categorized as 6X and 10X. Finer particles absorb more moisture, which results in caking. Because of anticaking agents, it cannot always be used as a substitute for granulated sugar. Canadian regulations limit powdered sugar to 5% starch or an anticaking agent.

== Other varieties ==
=== Caster sugar ===
Caster sugar (also referred to as superfine, bar, or baker's sugar) has a larger particle size than powdered sugar, approximately half that of granulated sugar, and has no added starch. It is commonly used in baking and cold mixed drinks because it dissolves faster than granulated white sugar. Caster sugar can be easily prepared at home by grinding white sugar in a food processor to make it finer. The most common food [recipe] in which caster sugar is used is meringue.

=== Snow powder ===
Snow powder (or snow sugar) is a non-melting form of icing sugar used for visual appeal on cakes or pastries that require refrigeration. It usually contains glucose, starch, and anti-binding agents (such as titanium dioxide, which gives it a vibrant white color), and retains its structure and look even when dusted onto baked goods that are slightly wet, such as fruit bars and tarts. It will not melt even if it is sprinkled on whipped cream or ice cream. It is mostly used for decorative purposes.

Snow sugar is less sweet than regular powdered sugar because glucose is around 20% less sweet than table sugar, which is sucrose.

== History ==
Factory-made powdered sugar became available during the 19th century. Before that, sugar came in the form of a sugar loaf, and bakers ground and sieved the lumps of sugar to get fine icing sugar.

== Bibliography ==
Media related to Powdered sugar at Wikimedia Commons

- Asadi, Mosen (2006). Beet-Sugar Handbook. John Wiley & Sons.
- Chen, James C. P.; Chou, Chung Chi (1993). Cane Sugar Handbook: A Manual for Cane Sugar Manufacturers and Their Chemists (12th ed.). John Wiley & Sons.
