= Jalebi =

Deep-fried South Asian pastry

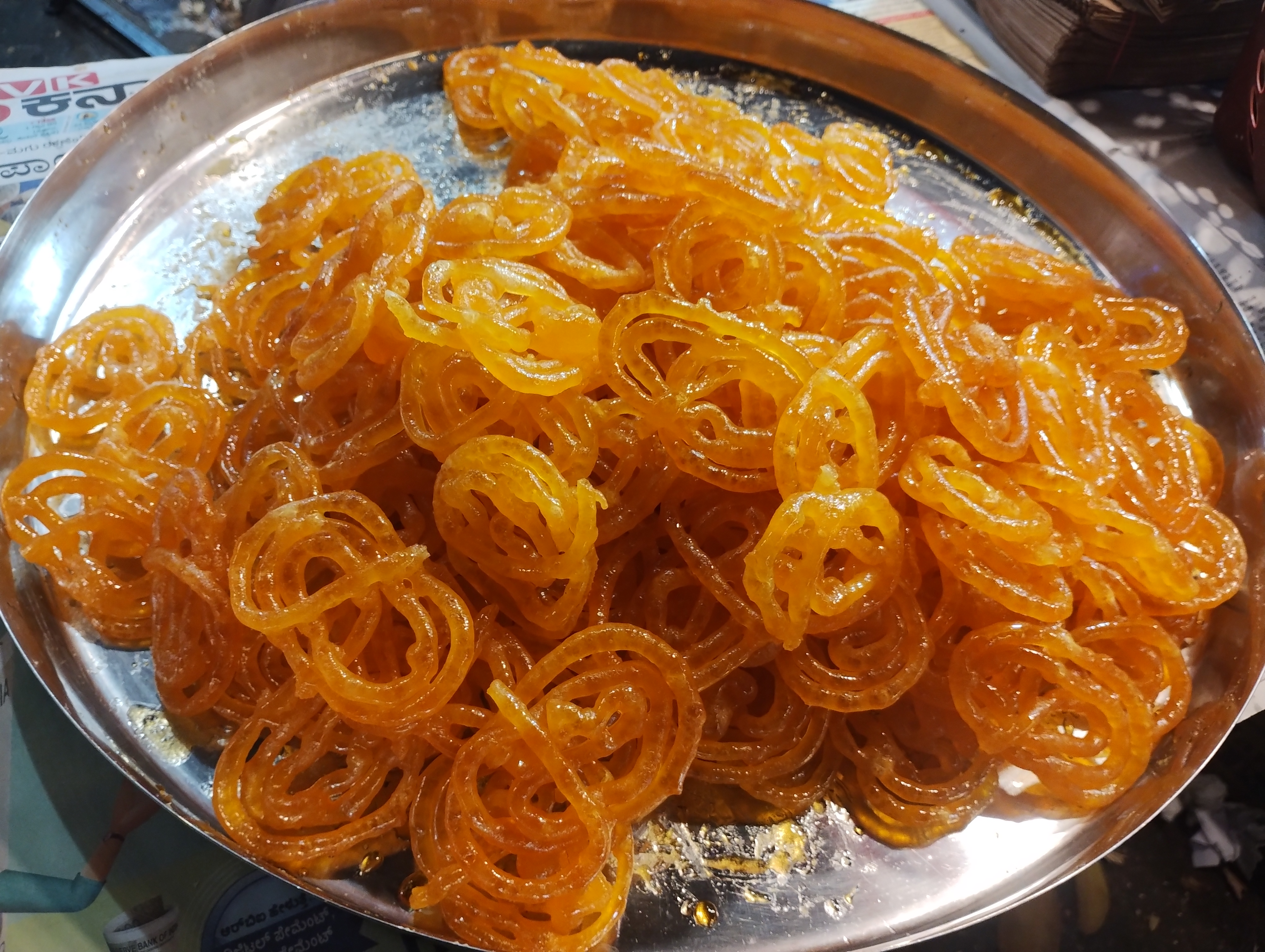
- Jalebi sold at Basavanagudi Kadalekai Parishe, Bangalore (2025)
- Alternative names: Jilapi, jilebi, jilbi, jilipi, jelabee, jerry, mushabak, zulbia, z'labia, zalabia, pani walalu
- Course: Dessert
- Place of origin: West Asia Regional variants: Afghanistan (جلیبی Jalebi); Algeria (Zalabia: زلابية); Azerbaijan (Zülbiyə or zilviyə); Bangladesh (Jilapi); Egypt (Meshabbek: مشبك); Ethiopia (Mushebek: ሙሸበክ); Fiji (Jalebi); India (Jilebi ജിലേബി); Iran (Zoolbia: زولبیا); Iraq (Zalabia); Kurdistan (Zülubiya); Nepal (Jerry जेरी); Pakistan (Jalebi جلیبی); Sri Lanka (Pani walalu පැණි වළලු); Syria (Zinghol); Tunisia (Zlabia); Turkey (Zulbiye); West Asia (Zalabiyeh)
- Region or state: West Asia, Indian subcontinent, Africa
- Serving temperature: Hot and/or cold
- Main ingredients: Maida flour or yeasted dough, saffron, ghee, sugar or honey
- Variations: Sesame oil, sesame seeds, yogurt, cinnamon, lemon, cardamon; different shapes
- Similar dishes: Afghan jalebi, chhena jalebi, imarti, shahi jilapi, bamiyeh, lokma, zalabiyeh

Jalebi being prepared by a street vendor in Bangalore, India

Jalebi (Note: It goes by many names, including jilapi, zelepi, jilebi, jilipi, zulbia, zoolbia, jerry, mushabak, z'labia, or zalabia. IPA: [dʒəleːbiː]) is a common sweet snack in South Asia, West Asia and some parts of Africa.

The south Asian variety is made by deep-frying maida flour (plain flour or all-purpose flour) batter in pretzel or circular shapes, which are then soaked in sugar syrup. Jalebi is eaten with curd or rabri (in North India) along with optional other flavors such as kewra (pandanus flower essence).

In some west Asian cuisines, jalebi may consist of yeast dough fried and then dipped in a syrup of honey and rose water. North African zalabia uses a different batter and a syrup of honey (Arabic: ʻasal) and rose water.

== History ==
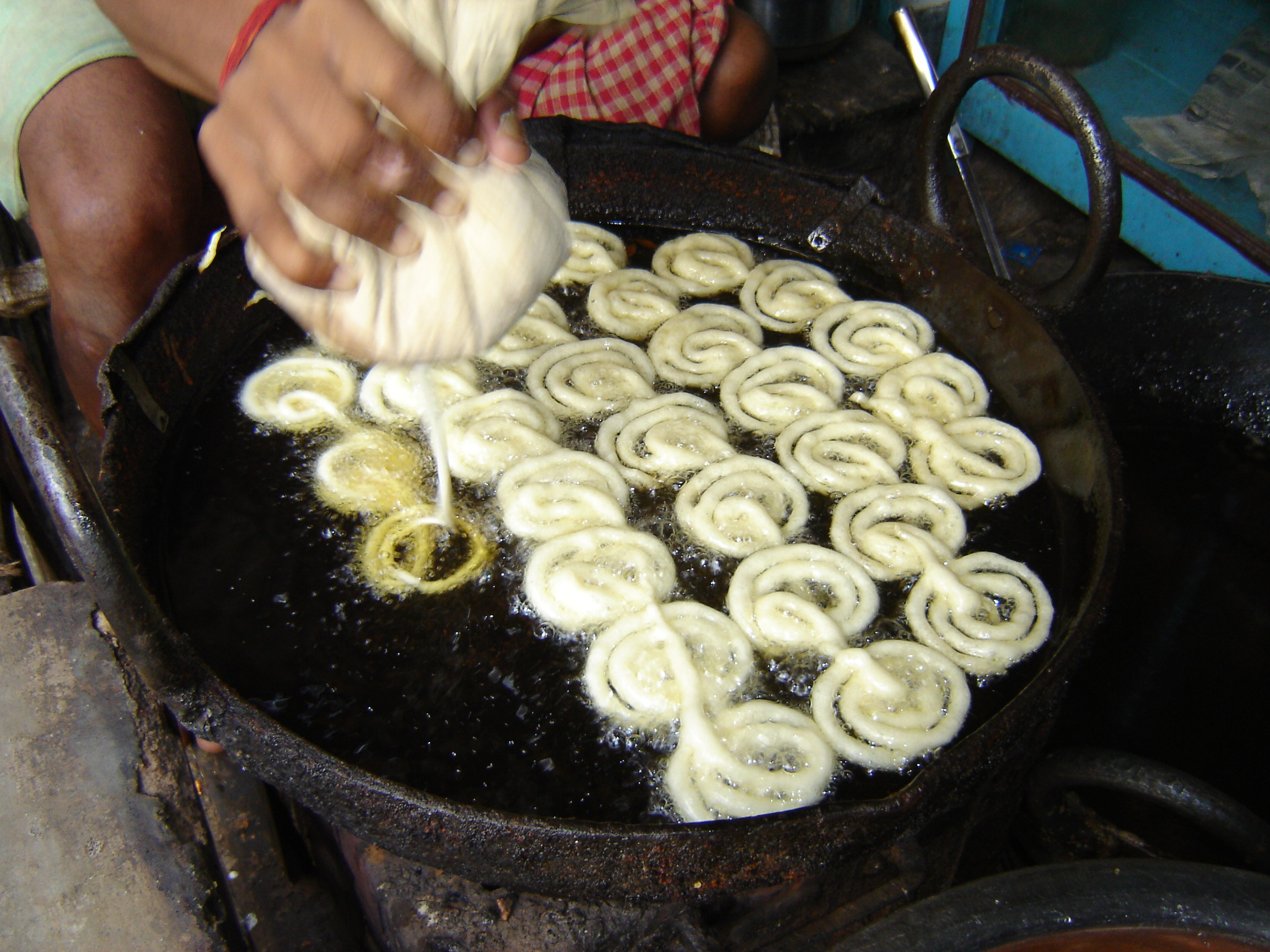
Jalebi batter being dropped in hot oil in Howrah, West Bengal, India

The earliest known recipe of this food comes from the 10th century in the Arabic cookbook Kitab al-Tabikh (English: The Book of Dishes) by Ibn Sayyar al-Warraq. In the 13th century Abbasid Caliphate, a cookbook by Muhammad bin Hasan al-Baghdadi mentioned a similar dish. Zalābiya mushabbaka as described by Ibn Sayyar, are latticed fritters made in discs, balls and squares. They are dipped in clarified honey perfumed with rose water, musk and camphor. A recipe from a caliph's kitchen suggests milk, clarified butter, sugar and pepper to be added. Zalābiya funiyya is a "sponge cake" version cooked in a special round pot on a trivet and cooked in a tannur.

According to the Hobson-Jobson (1903) historical dictionary, the word jalebi is derived from the Arabic word zulabiya, or the Persian zolbiya.

Priyamkara-nrpa-katha, a work by the Jain author Jinasura, composed around 1450 CE, mentions jalebi in the context of a dinner held by a rich merchant. Gunyagunabodhini, another Sanskrit work dating before 1600 CE, lists the ingredients and recipe of the dish; these are identical to the ones used to prepare the modern jalebi. According to the Indian ambassador Nagma Malik, jalebi might have started life in Turkey and then arrived in Tunisia long ago before making its way to India. Others claim that it was created by a musician during the reign of the Abbasid caliph Harun al-Rashid, Abdourrahman Ibnou Nafaâ Ziriab, who made a prolonged stop over in Tunisia while traveling from Baghdad to Andalusia.

It has been suggested that the American funnel cake is derived from the Arab and Persian cuisine, brought by German emigrants and called Drechterkuche.

== Regional varieties ==
=== Central Asia ===
==== Afghanistan ====
In Afghanistan, Jalebi is a popular dessert. There are some slight differences between Afghan Jalebi and other variants. The Afghan Jalebi does not use any food coloring in contrast to the Indian and Pakistani variants and so is usually yellow and not orange in color. The Afghan Jalebi is also thinner. It is a popular dessert that is commonly consumed in households and at public events such as weddings or festivals. Jalebi is oftentimes served with green tea. There is also a popular song from the Bollywood film Phantom named Afghan Jalebi.

=== Indian subcontinent ===
==== India ====
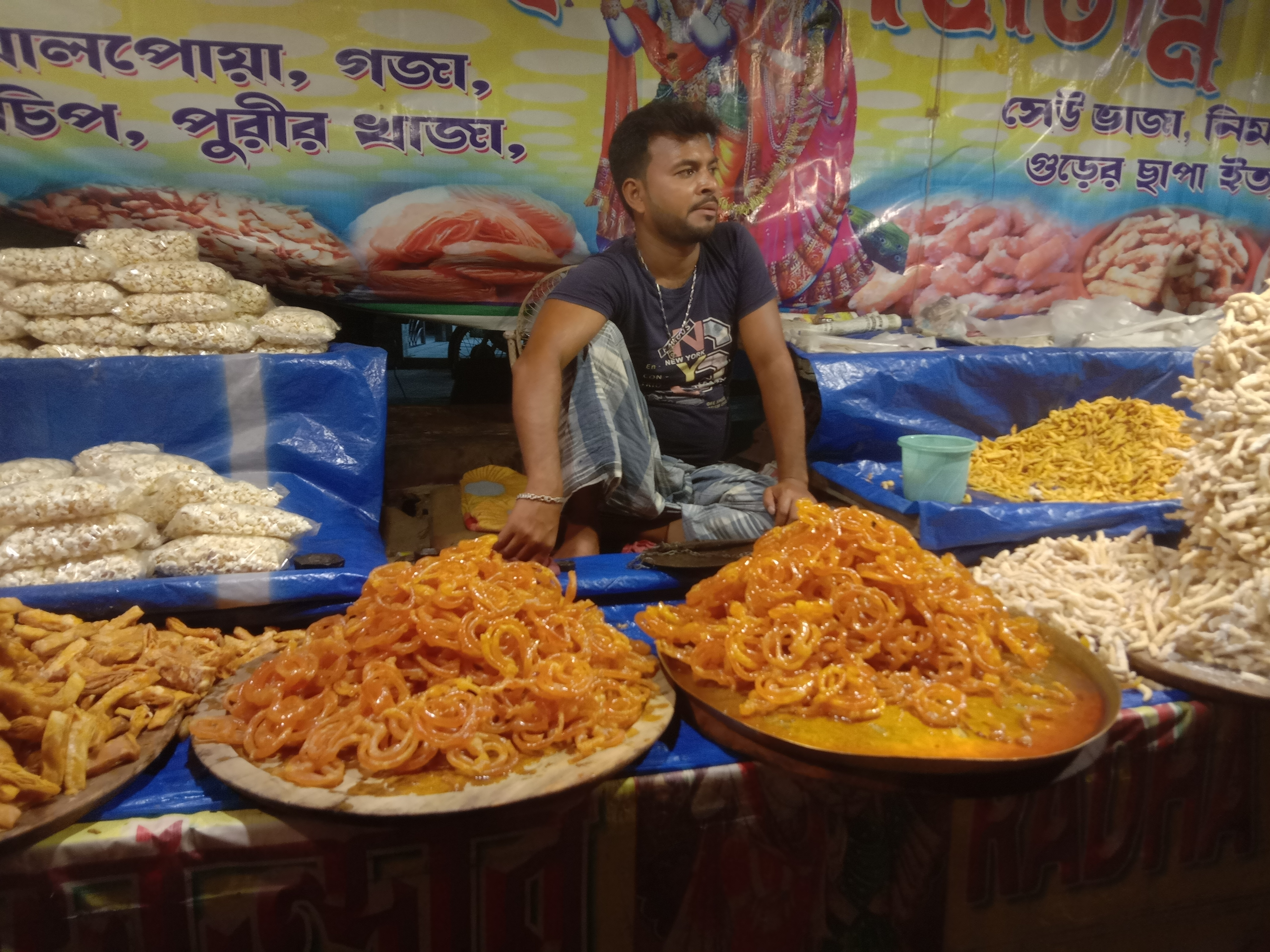
Jalebis for sale at a shop during Ratha Yatra festival in West Bengal, India

Jalebi made from khoya or mawa, was invented by Harprasad Badkul, in the year 1889, in Jabalpur.

In Norman Chevers book, A Manual of Medical Jurisprudence for India (1870, page 178) mentions "jelabees" as a historical way of poisoning prisoners in India in the 1800s.

==== Pakistan ====
In Pakistan, jalebis are a popular dessert that are commonly consumed in households and in public events such as weddings or festivals. Particularly during winter season, used as commonly paired with warm milk as a breakfast option. Also consumed as a snack with evening tea, or sometimes served alongside savory items like samosas and other sweets such as gulab jamun, offering a combination of flavors.

==== Nepal ====
In Nepal, it is known as Jerry, a word derived from Jangiri and the Mughal Emperor Jahangir. People usually eat Jerry with Swari, a very thin fried bread like Puri (food). It is often eaten in morning with Nepali Masala chiya.

=== West Asia ===
==== Iran ====
It is known as zoolbia (زولبیا) in Iran, although when translated into English, the spelling has alternatives and can include zolbiya, zulbiā, zulbia, zolbia, and others. In addition to being sweetened with honey and sugar, zoolbias in Iran is also flavoured with saffron or rose water. Often in Iran, zoolbia is served with Persian-style black tea alongside a similar dessert with a different "egg" shape, bamiyeh. These desserts are commonly served during Ramadan month as one of the main elements eaten after fasting.

In Iran, where it is known as zolbiya, the sweet was traditionally given to the poor during Ramadan. A 10th century cookbook gives several recipes for zulubiya. There are several surviving 13th century recipes for the sweetmeat, the most widely accepted being that mentioned in a cookbook by Muhammad bin Hasan al-Baghdadi.

==== Azerbaijan ====
Zulbiya or zilviya is one of the unique sweets of Ganja, one of the ancient cities of Azerbaijan. In the past, Zilviya was considered one of the main attributes of the Novruz in Ganja. Zilviya was usually cooked a few days before Novruz and served on the eve of the holiday. Just as each of the sweets and cookies placed on the table on the eve of holiday has a certain meaning in connection with Novruz, the round-shaped zilviyas, mostly baked in yellow and red, symbolized the equality of night and day on 21 March.

==== Arab countries ====
Zalābiya or zalabia, zalabiya (زلابية) (Maghrebi Arabic: زلابية) are found in the Levant and other West Asian countries, including the Arab countries of Yemen, Egypt, and Iraq.

These are fried dough foods, including types similar to doughnuts. Zalābiya are made from a batter composed of eggs, yeasted flour, and milk, and then cooked in oil. They are made by a zalbāni. Unlike jalebi, the West Asian variety may have a different shape, more like a free-form doughnut or a ball (but this is depending on the exact region and culture), and it may contain cinnamon, lemon, and powdered sugar. In Yemen, the manner of preparing the zalabiyeh differed from the variety of jalebi made in the Indian sub-continent, insofar that the Indian variety was dipped in syrup, to give to it a glaze-like finish, whereas the Yemeni variety of zalabiyeh was "made from a soft yeast bread [and] which is fried on both sides in deep oil. There are those who add to the dough black cumin for improved taste. They are eaten while they are still hot, while some have it as a practice to eat them with honey or with sugar."

Zalābiyeh is first mentioned in a 10th-century Arabic cookbook by Ibn Sayyar al-Warraq, a book later translated by Nawal Nasrallah. Ernest A Hamwi, a Syrian immigrant to the United States, is believed to have used the Persian version zalabia as an early ice cream cone.

=== Africa ===
==== North Africa ====
Zlebia or zlabia is a type of pastry eaten in parts of Northwest Africa, such as Algeria, Tunisia and Libya. Natural ingredients include flour, yeast, yoghurt, and sugar or honey. This is then mixed with water and commonly two seeds of cardamom (oil for the crackling).

In Tunisia, the Zlabia is known to be a speciality of the city of Beja. In Algeria, the Zlabia of Boufarik, which is less greasy than the others and moderately sweet, is particularly successful.

==== Ethiopia ====
Mushabak or Mushabaka is a popular food mainly in the Oromo region. It comes in different shapes and sizes and is usually bathed with sugar syrup or honey. Mushabaka is normally baked red. It is often served at celebrations and other social events.

=== Mauritius ===
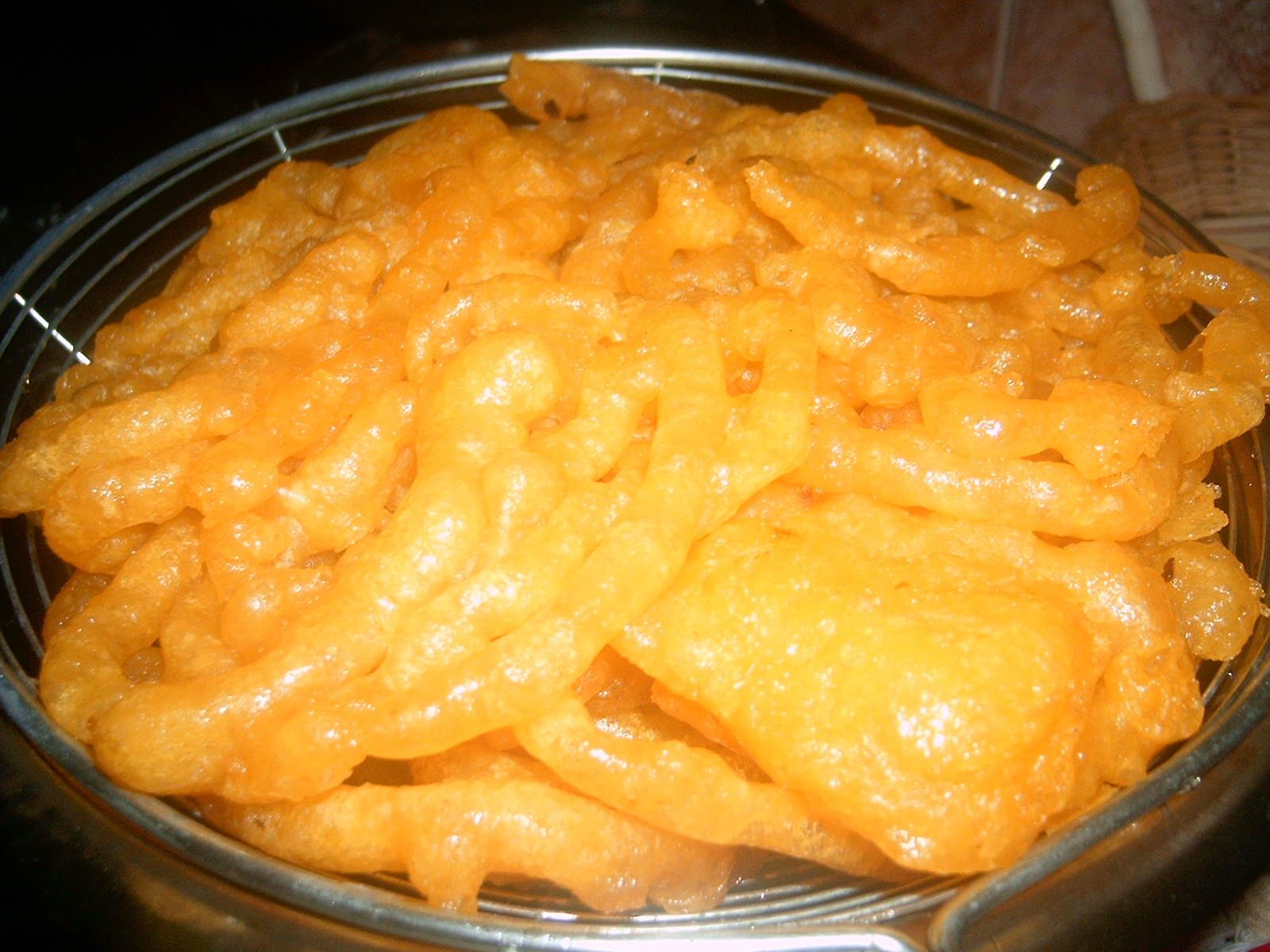
Hot Mauritian jalebi, also known as "Gato Moutaille"

In Mauritius, jalebi are known as "Gateau Moutaille"; they are of Indian origin.

== Recipe variations ==
They are often stick shaped. They are eaten year-round, including in expatriate communities such as in France, although they are especially popular during Ramadan celebrations.

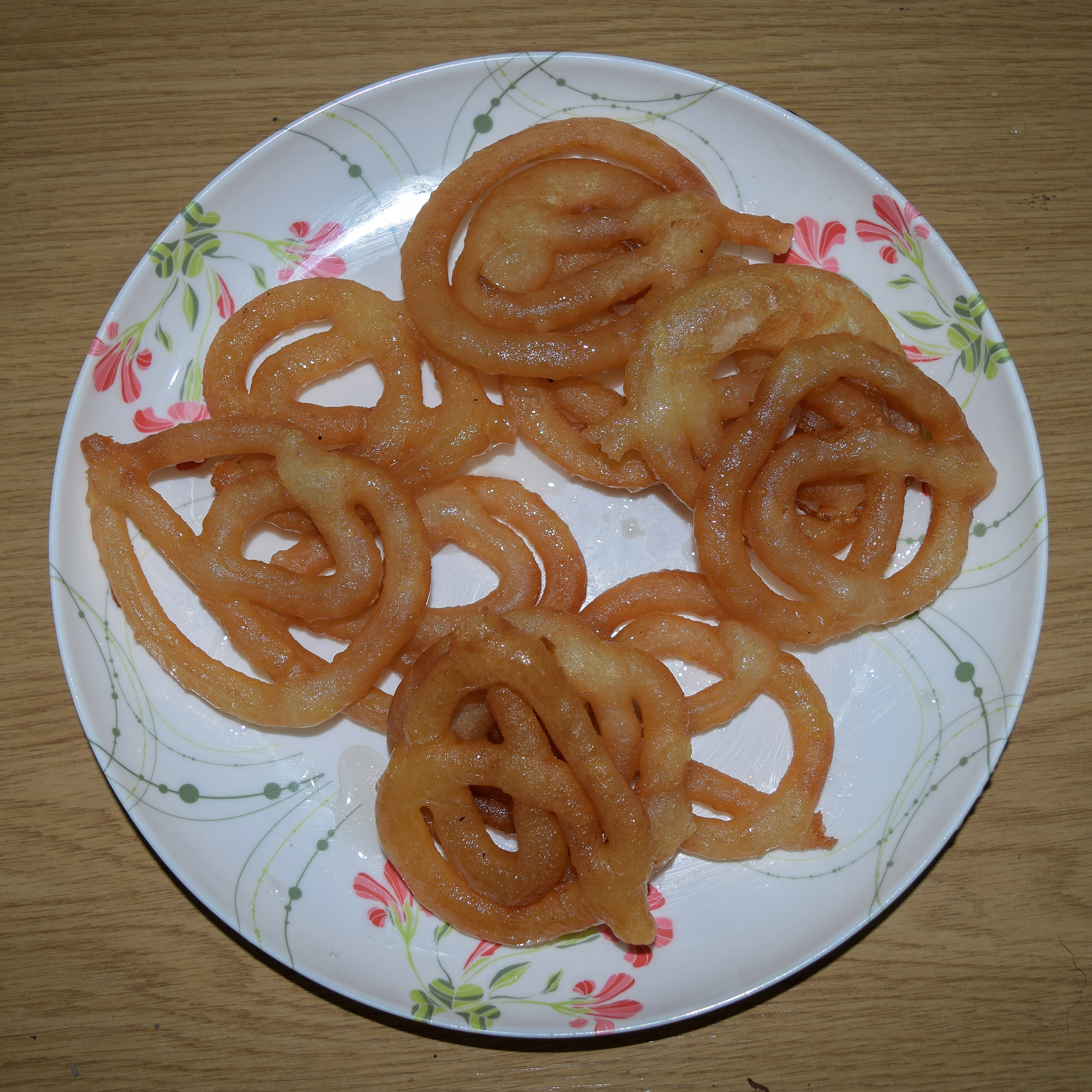
Jilapi in Bangladesh, generally consumed as a sweetmeat, is a popular starter at social events.

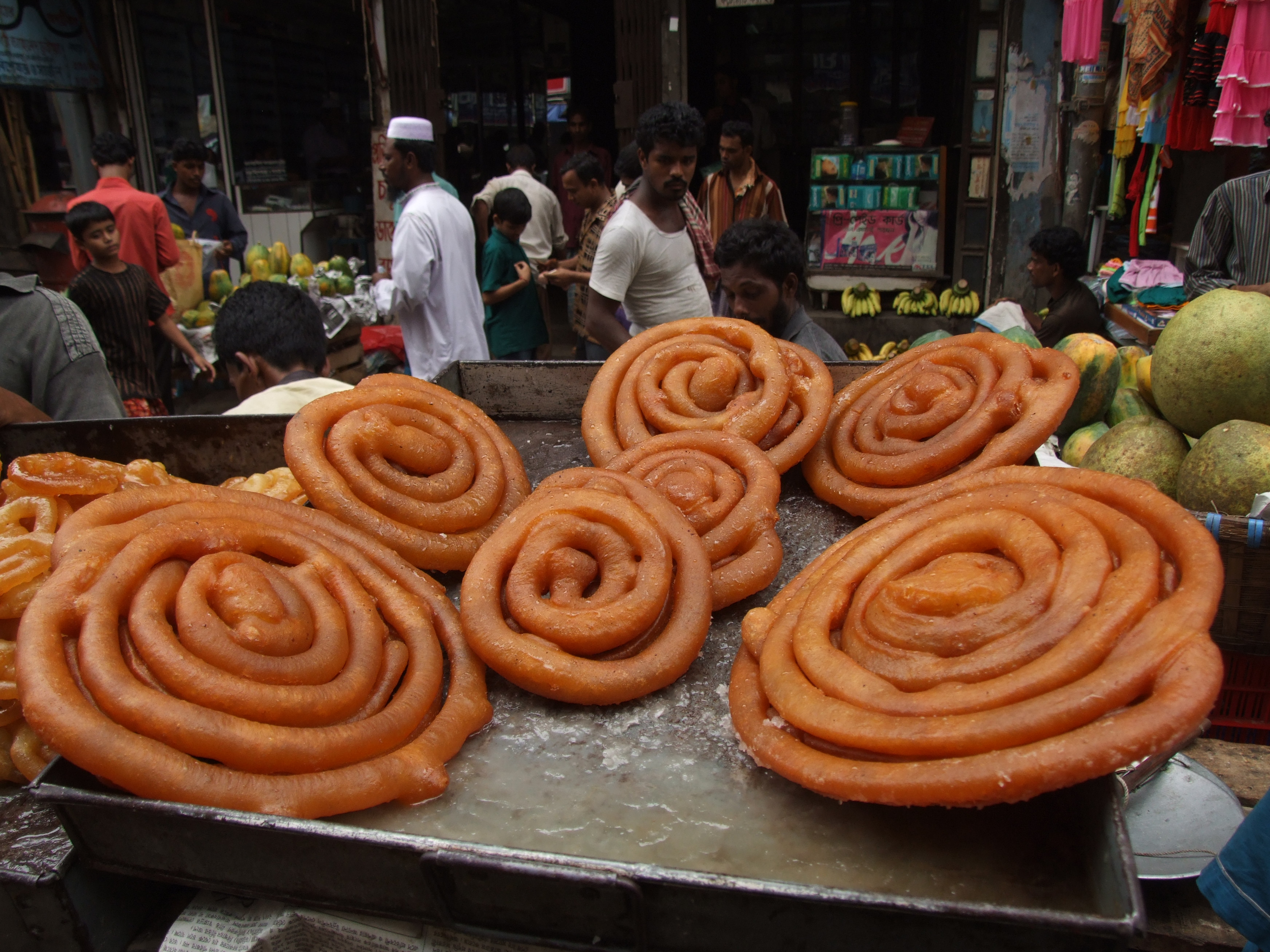
Shahi jilapi, meaning King's jilapi, in Dhaka, Bangladesh. It is the largest form of the dessert.

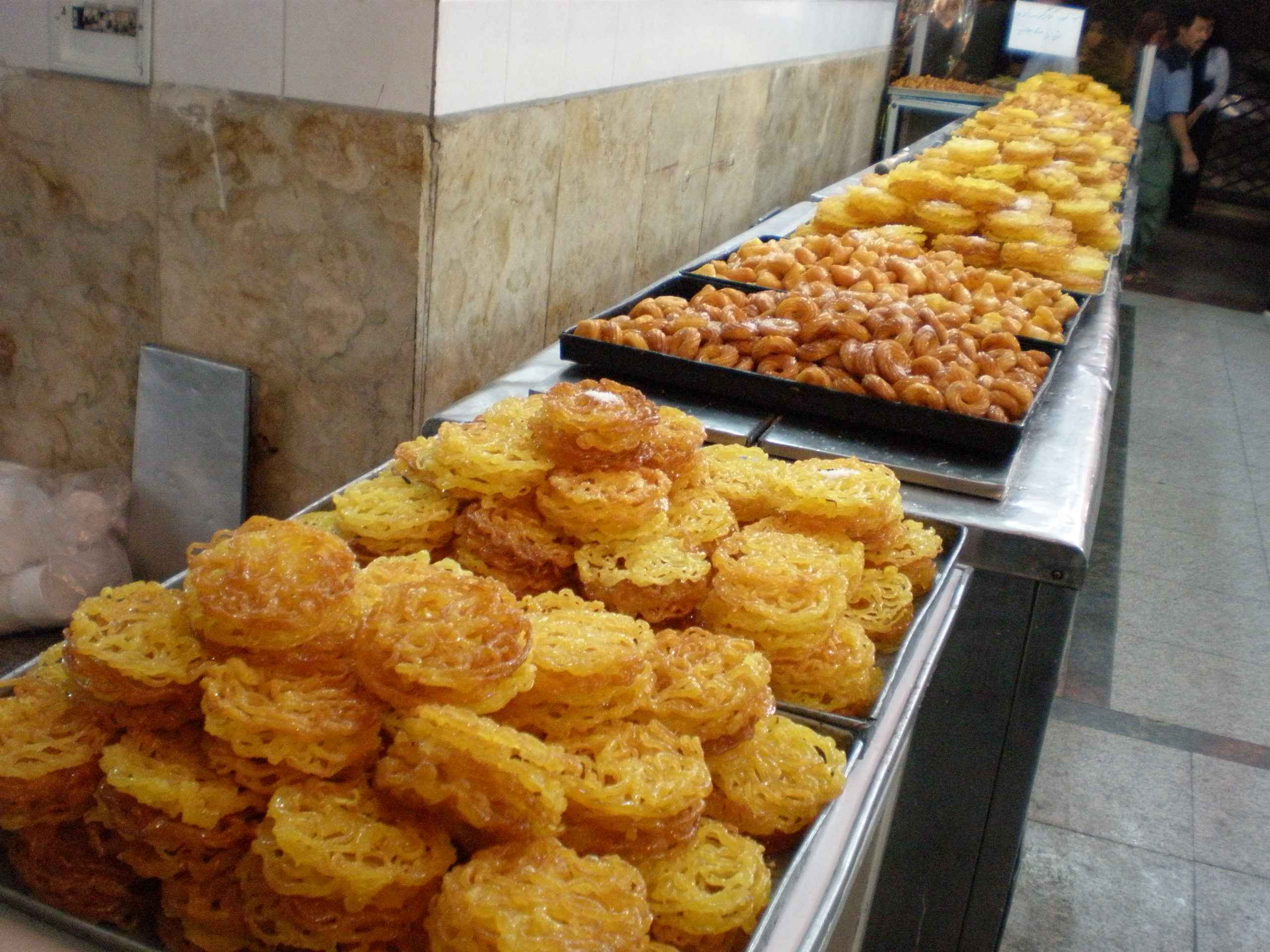
Zulbiā and bāmieh in Iran

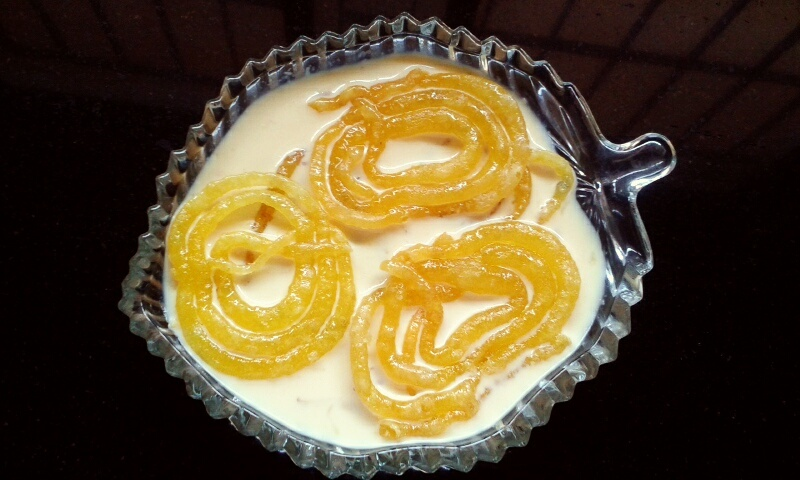
Jalebi dipped in rabri

== See also ==
- Lakhamari
- List of deep fried foods
- List of fried dough foods
- List of Indian sweets and desserts
- List of African dishes
