= Tulumba =

Middle eastern and Balkan dessert

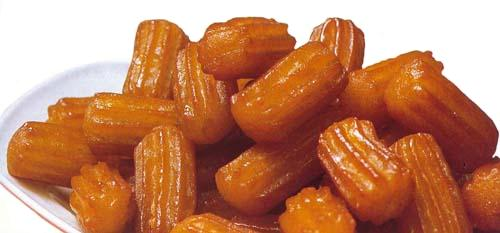
- Tulumba
- Alternative names: balah ash-shaam (Arabic: بلح الشام)
- Type: Dessert
- Place of origin: Egypt, Syria, Ottoman Empire
- Region or state: Egypt, Balkans, Levant, South Caucasus
- Main ingredients: Flour, butter, salt, water, syrup, vanilla extract

Tulumba, tolomba, balah ash-shaam, or bamiyeh (Persian: بامیه; Arabic: بلح الشام) is a deep-fried dessert found in Egypt, the Levant, Greece and the regional cuisines of the former Ottoman Empire. It is a fried batter soaked in syrup, similar to jalebis or churros. It is made from unleavened choux pastry dough, usually about 3 inches long, piped with a pastry bag using an open star or similar tip. It is first deep-fried to golden colour and then sugar-sweet syrup is poured over it when still hot.

== Name ==
Tulumba literally means 'pump' in Ottoman Turkish, deriving from the Italian tromba.

Tulumba features in Balkan, Greek (Greek: τουλούμπα), and Turkish cuisines.

The dessert goes by many names in different regions:

- In Hejazi Arabic, it is called ṭurumba (Arabic: طُرُمْبَة) directly from Italian: tromba
- In Egyptian, Levantine, and some Arab cuisines it is called balaḥ ash-Shām (Arabic: بلح الشام), literally "Levantine dates".
- In Armenian cuisine, it may be called either pomp or tulumba (Armenian: թուլումբա).
- In Persian cuisine, it is known as bamiyeh (Persian: باميه), after the vegetable of the same Persian name (okra), due to its shape.
- In Iraqi cuisine it is known as datli (Arabic: داطلي), directly coming from Turkish word tatlı.
- The dessert is called pomba in Cypriot Greek and bombacık in Cypriot Turkish.
- In Turkish, it is called tulumba tatlisi, meaning "pump dessert".
- In Bulgarian and Serbo-Croatian, it is called tulumba (Serbian: тулумба), from Ottoman Turkish.

== History ==
Tulumba in its modern form was likely influenced by medieval Arab cuisine; books like Kitab al-Tabikh by 10th century author Ibn Sayyar al-Warraq mention similar dishes like zalabiyeh.

According to food historian Priscilla Mary Işın, the oldest recipes dates back to 1900, credited to Mahmud Nedim. The recipe mentions that tulumba was in Erzurum, Anatolia.

== Main ingredients ==
It is made from a yogurt and starch and flour-based dough, often with eggs, which is fried before being dipped in qatir. It is a special sweet often eaten at Iftar in Ramadan. It is also commonly sold alongside jalebi, which is prepared in a similar way, but arranged in a web-like arrangement of strips of dough.

Some varieties include spices like cardamom.

== Varieties ==
Halka tatlı is a Turkish dessert considered by some to be a variation of tulumba.

Iraqi datli is typically made without eggs.

In the city of Taiz in Yemen, tulumba is made by mixing eggs and flour into hot water, then kneading the dough, which is then cut into pieces that are first dipped into cold oil, and then fried before adding syrup.

== Gallery ==
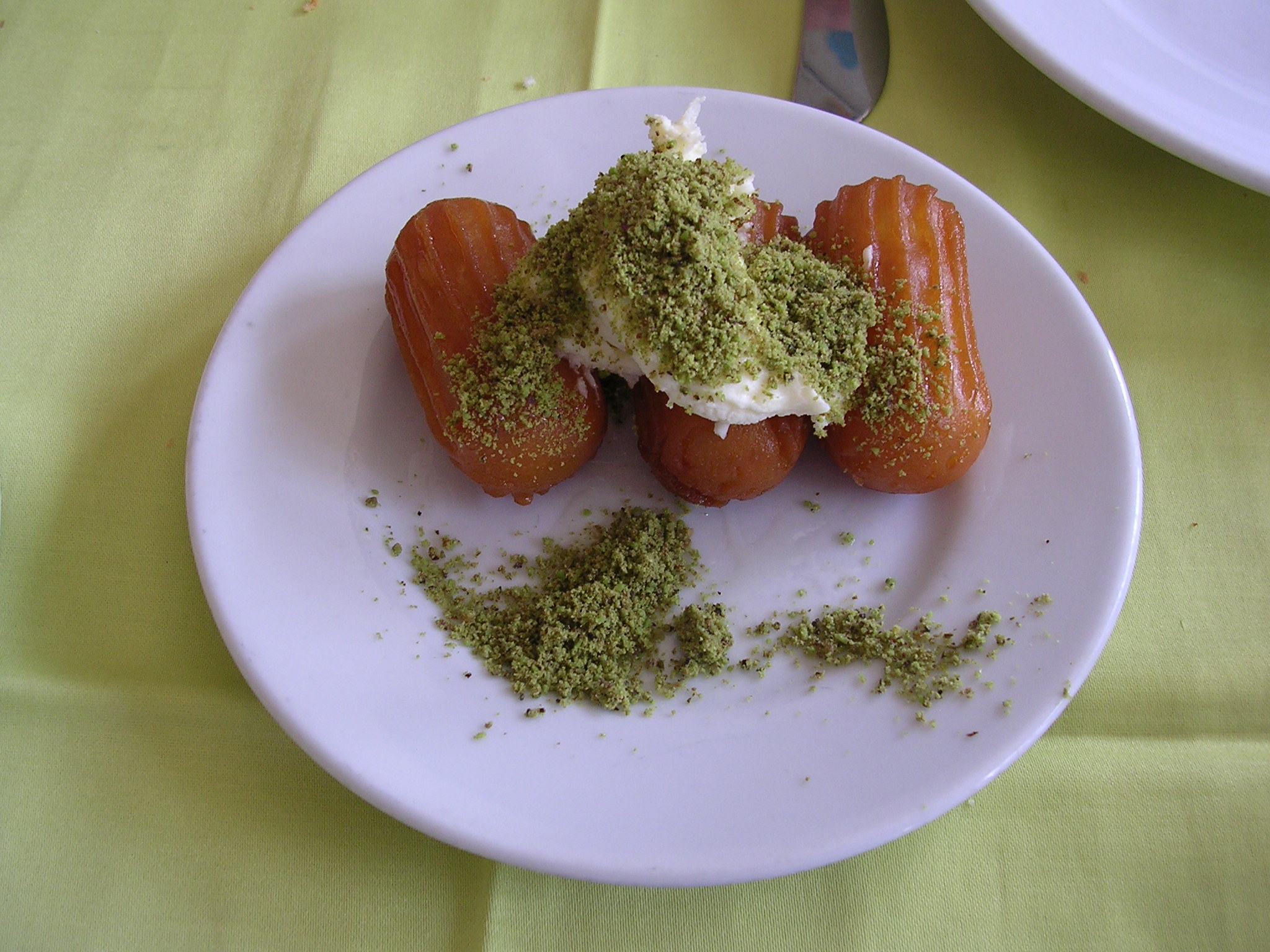
Tulumba with kaymak and pistachio

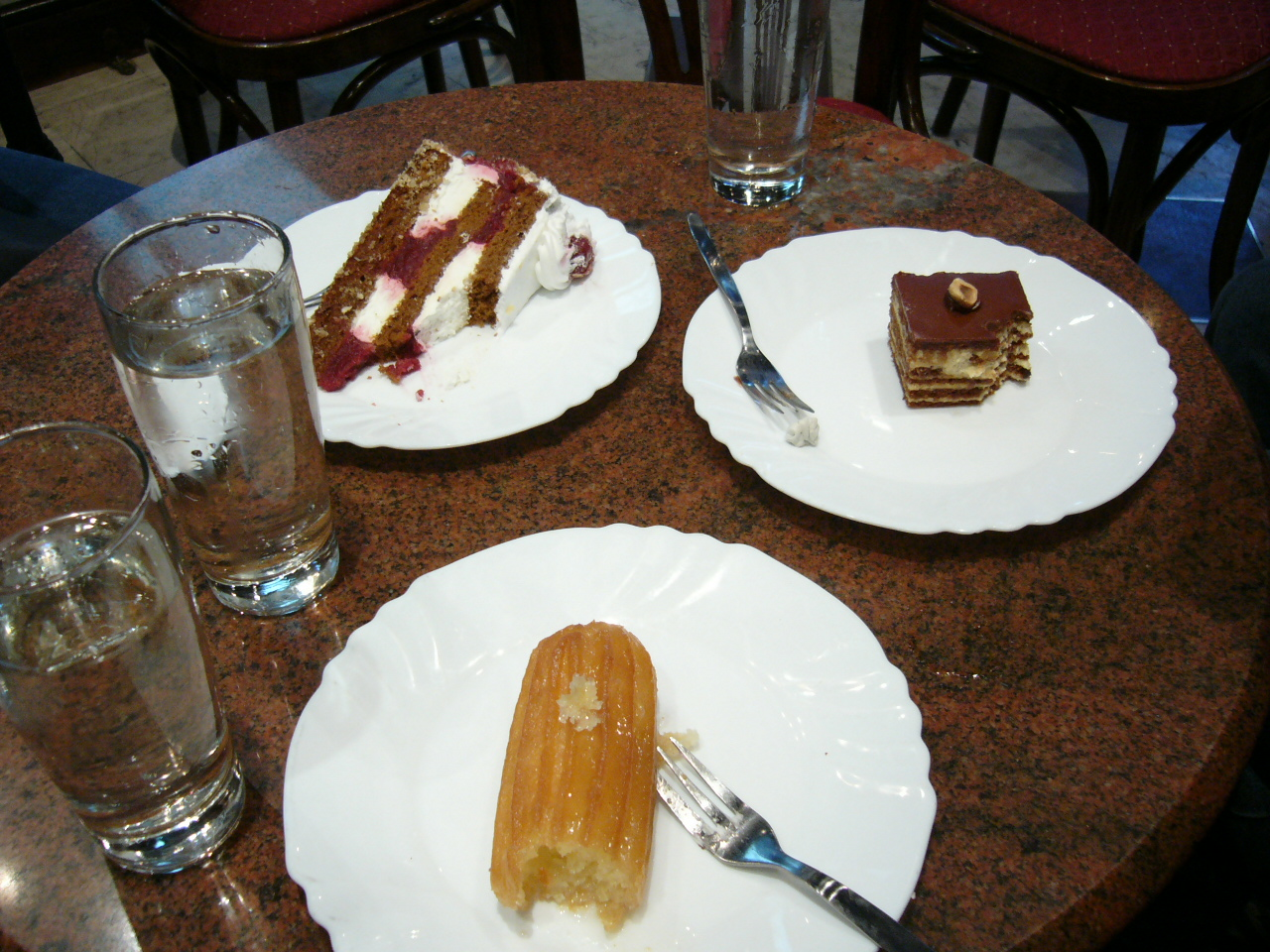
Tulumba cross-section (front)

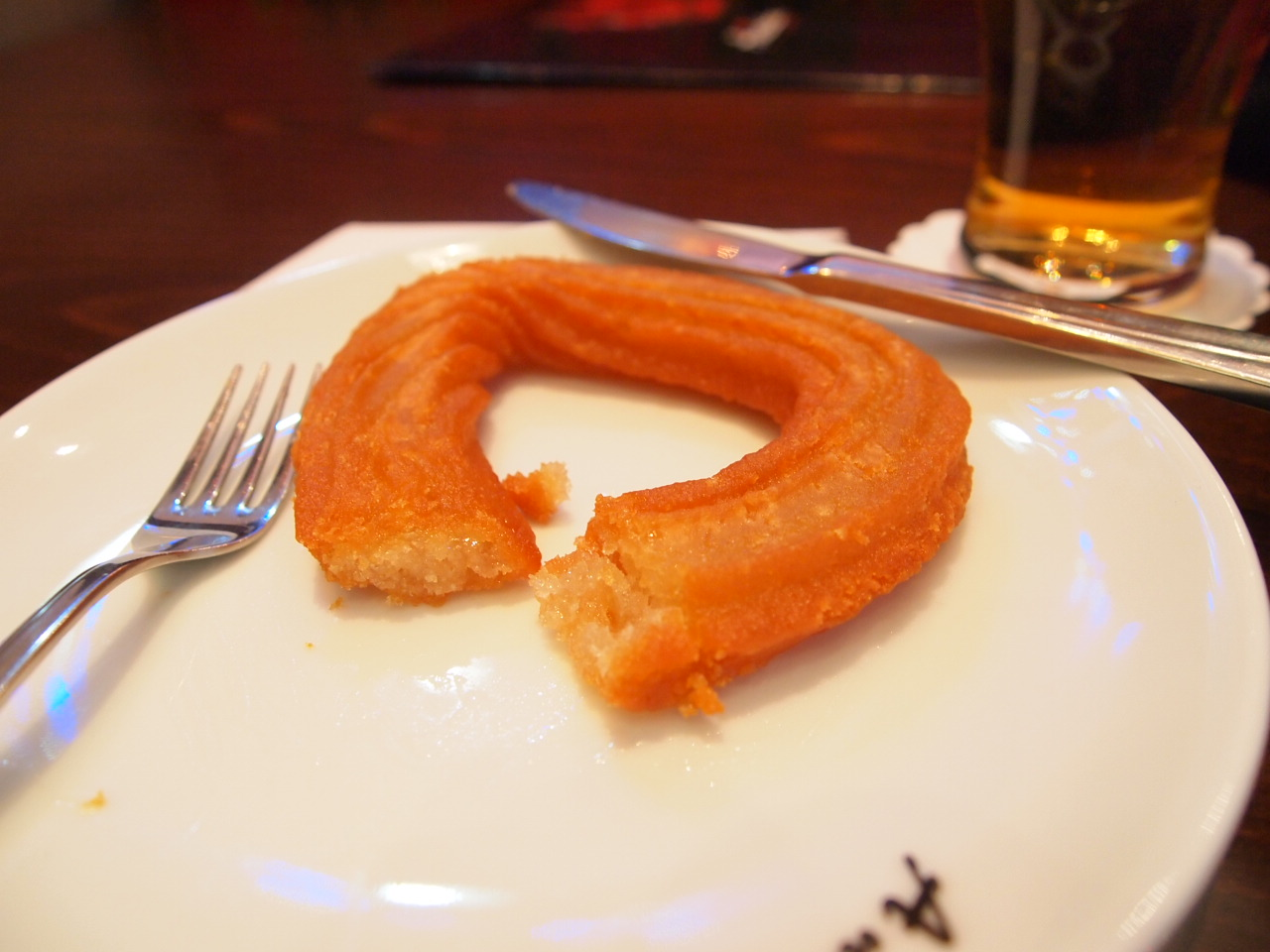
Round

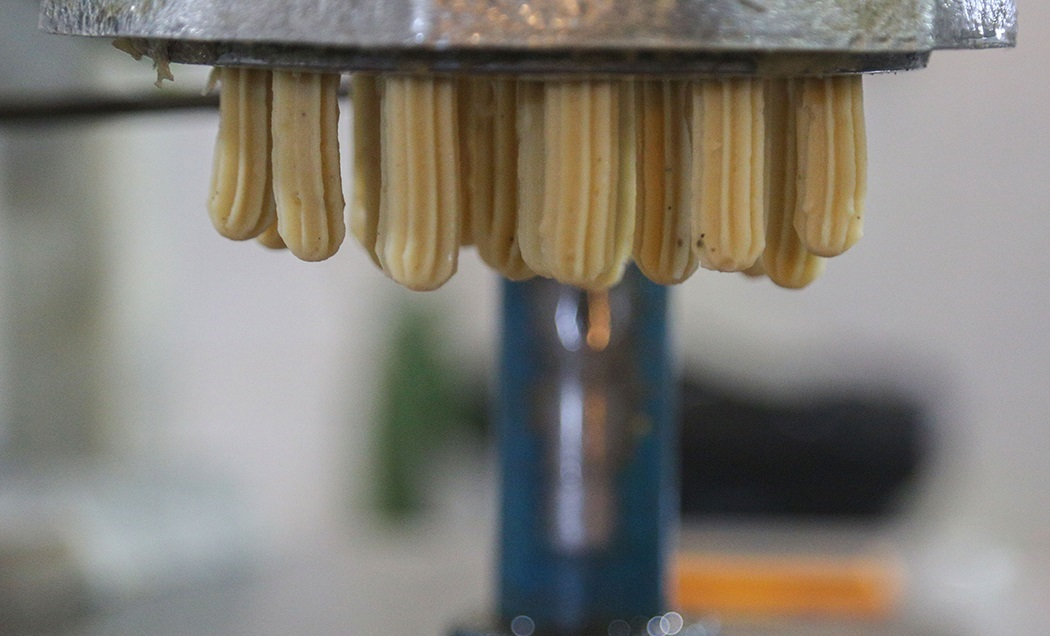
Iranian bamiyeh being made

== See also ==
- List of doughnut varieties
- List of fried dough varieties
- List of Turkish desserts
- Buñuelo
- Fartura
- Gorgoria
- Lokma
- Pinaypay
