= Zalabiyeh =

Deep-fried West Asian pastry

- Zalabiyeh
- Alternative names: Spongy dough (sufgan), zlebia, jalebie, zülbiya, jilapi
- Type: Fritter, Doughnut
- Region or state: Middle East, North Africa, West Asia, Ethiopia, Europe, Algeria
- Main ingredients: Batter (flour, yeast, water, salt), sugar, Optional: eggs, milk, sesame oil, sesame seeds

Zalabiyeh (Arabic: زلابية) is a fritter or doughnut found in several cuisines across the Arab world, West Asia and some parts of Europe influenced by the former. The fritter version is made from a semi-thin batter of wheat flour which is poured into hot oil and deep-fried. The earliest known recipe for the dish comes from a 10th-century Arabic cookbook and was originally made by pouring the batter through a coconut shell. Zalabiyeh differs from lokma in that it is made from batter rather than yeast dough, though the names are sometimes used interchangeably.

== History ==
The earliest known recipes for zalabiya comes from the 10th century Arabic cookbook Kitab al-Tabikh. The book provided recipes to unlatticed and latticed (zalabiya mushabbaka, Arabic: زلابية مشبكة) versions of the dessert. At the time, zalabiyeh was thought to be an aphrodisiac. In the old Al-Baghdadi book of recipes of the Arabs; The dough was poured through a coconut shell. This style of fritter is similar to the Indian jelabi and a 16th-century recipe from German cuisine for strauben made using a funnel.

Different methods have developed in the preparation of the pastry dessert. According to Muqadassi (10th-century CE), the people in Greater Syria during winter "[would] prepare the unlatticed type of Zalabiya. This would be the deep-fried bread fritter Zalabiya. Some are elongated in shape, similar to crullers, while the smaller ones, sometimes made into balls, are similar to the shape of dumplings." In North Africa, they would give the name Zalabiya to a different type of pastry, namely to the Mushabbak, being a deep-fried lattice-shaped pastry made by looping batter, and drenched in ʻasal (honey) syrup or qatr."

In 1280, the Jewish–Sicilian doctor Faraj ben Salim translated into Latin a pharmaceutical book, (English: The Table of Countries; Latin: Tacvini Aegritvdinvm et Morborum ferme omnium Corporis humani), which was authored by Ibn Jazla an Arab physician and consists of a number of Persian recipes, including one for "Zelebia".

15th-century Turkish poet Kaygusuz Abdal mentions zalabiyeh in a poem, which is seen as an indicator of its early presence in Ottoman cuisine. A recipe for it appears in a 15th-century Turkish cookbook by Muhammad Shirvani adapted from Muhammad bin Hasan al-Baghdadi's 13th century cookbook. Shirvani's recipe describes a batter made from starch, sour milk and animal fat, poured through a perforated vessel into hot oil to form shapes before being fried and dipped in syrup. The recipe also describes coloring the pastry red by adding a dye to the frying oil, reflecting a practice also found in earlier Arabic recipes, which used saffron for yellow colouring and wine sediment for red. Zalabiyeh was purchased in large quantities for the Ottoman palace during the reigns of Mehmed II and Bayezid II and was served at the 1539 circumcision celebrations for the sons of Suleiman the Magnificent. By the 19th century, it was still made in Istanbul and was among the sweets brought as gifts to women who had recently given birth. According to food historian Priscilla Mary Işın, the dessert also spread to India by the 15th century, where it became known as jalebi.

Among Yemenite Jews, the zalabiyeh was a treat eaten especially during the winter months. In Yemen, the zalabiyeh was fried in a soapstone pot lined with oil about 1 cm deep, in which oil and sometimes honey was mixed. There, zalabiyeh was "made from a soft yeast bread [and] which is fried on both sides in deep oil. There are those who add to the dough black cumin for improved taste. They are eaten while they are still hot, while some have it as a practice to eat them with honey or with sugar."

=== Early known origins ===
According to 2 Samuel 13:8–10 King David's daughter prepared fritters (Hebrew: לְבִיבוֹת) for her step-brother Amnon. By the 2nd-century CE, the name of the fritter had taken on the name sūfğenīn (Hebrew: סוּפְגְּנִין) in Mishnaic Hebrew, a word derived from its sponge-like texture with alveolar holes.

== Customs ==
Packs of circular meshabbak in Egypt, during a Mawlid celebration

Zalabiyeh are commonly eaten by Muslims during the month of Ramadan, Palestinians and Jordanians also eat mushabbak (modern Levantine version of zalabiyeh) on Mawlid. Serving mushabbak on Mawlid is also traditional in Egypt.

Indian Christian communities during Advent and Easter, and by Sephardic Jews for Hanukkah.

Arab Christians in the Levant eat zalabiyeh on Eid il-Burbara and Eid al-Ghitas.

In Lebanon, a version of zalabiyeh made from yeast dough is eaten on the night of January 5 to celebrate the baptism of Jesus Christ. The dough is mixed with aniseed and, in the South of the country, three holes are made in the dough to symbolize the Holy Trinity. They are eaten in both their elongated form and their round form on that day.

Zalabiyeh (or zelebi) are a traditional sufgan ("spongy dough") for Persian Jews.

Turkish Christians eat müşebbek for the Feast of Assumption.

== Modern variations ==
The fritter is very common in the Indian subcontinent, in India, Pakistan, Sri Lanka, Nepal, and Bangladesh, although made differently to that of the Middle Eastern and North African variety. In many Middle Eastern and North African countries, such as Iran, Iraq, Jordan, Syria, Lebanon, Tunisia, Algeria, Sudan, and also in Egypt, they resemble spongy-cakes fried in oil.

In Iran, where it is known as zolbiya, the sweet was traditionally given to the poor during Ramadan. There are several 13th-century recipes for the sweet, the most accepted being given in a cookbook by Muhammad bin Hasan al-Baghdadi.

In Iraq in the 20th-century, starch (Arabic: النشا) was a basic ingredient in their zalabiyeh, topped with sugar. In Mosul, different varieties of zalabiyeh are made during Ramadan, some varieties exclude the syrup.

=== Southeast Europe ===
Turkish Halka Tatlısı, also known as müşebbek

Modern day Turkish tulumba and Halka tatlı were likely influenced by medieval zalabiyeh. Halka is also known as müşebbek in Turkish, and its particularly popular during Ramadan. Müşebbek was registered as geographical indication by the Turkish Patent and Trademark Office in June 2026, in the province of Hatay. In North Macedonia they are called Pitulitsi while in the Italian region of Apulia they are referred to as Pittule and are usually consumed in December.

Zülbiye is a variety of zalabiyeh found in Turkey. According a folk legend, it was popularized in Pergamon by an Ottoman soldier who returned to Pergamon from Damascus during the 19th century, bringing the tradition with him. It is specifically made during Ramadan, and is dyed using food coloring.

=== The Levant ===
In the Levant, mushabbak is a modern descendent of medieval zalabiyeh. Modern Lebanese zalabiyeh are sometimes finger shaped.

In Palestinian cuisine, specifically in Nablus, zalabiyeh is a fried triangular flatbread that is served with candied pumpkins. In Jordan, zalabiyeh made as fried sweetened flatbread.

Flat, triangular zalabiyeh in Nablus.

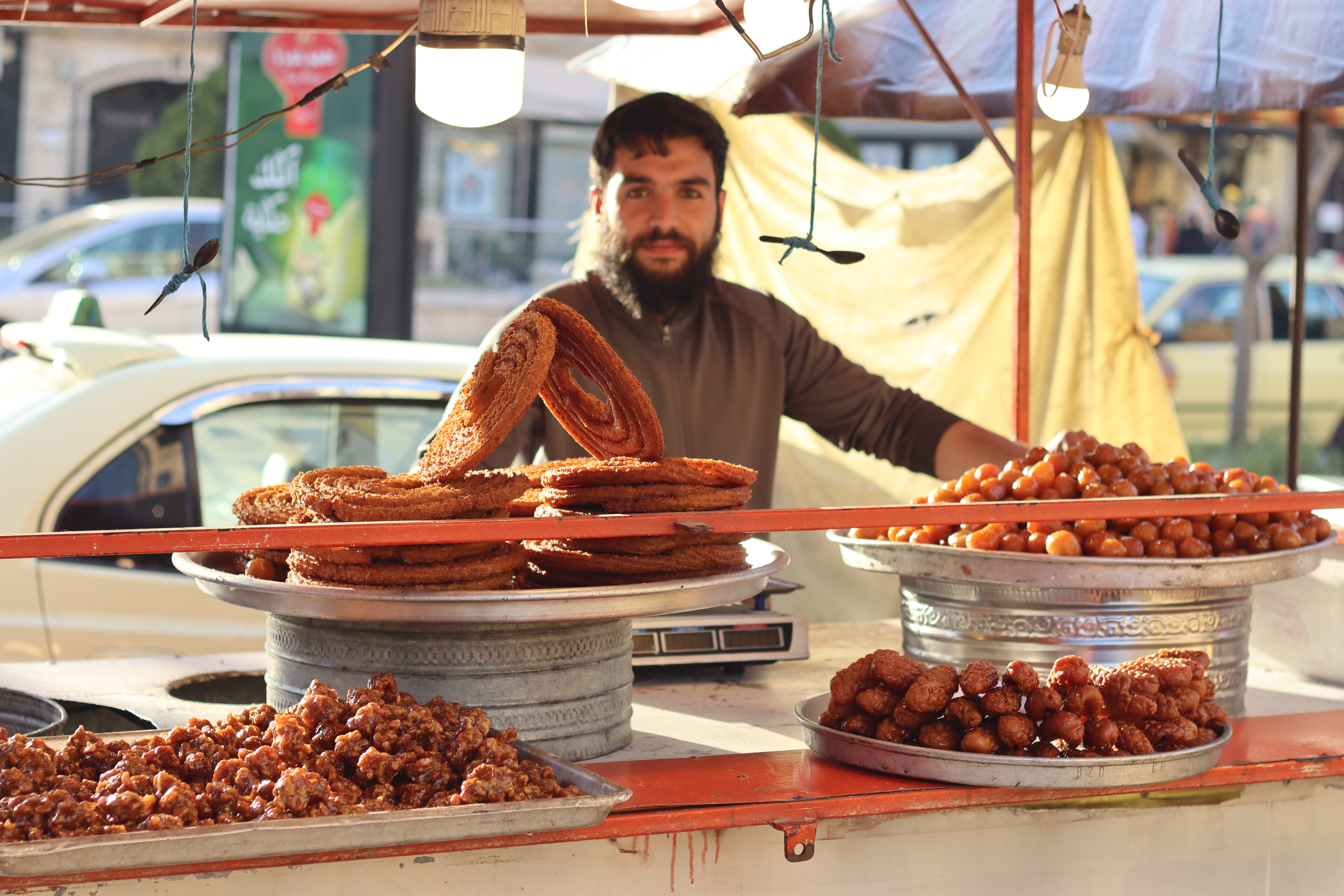
Syrian street vendor selling mushabbak (top left) along with lokma (top right)

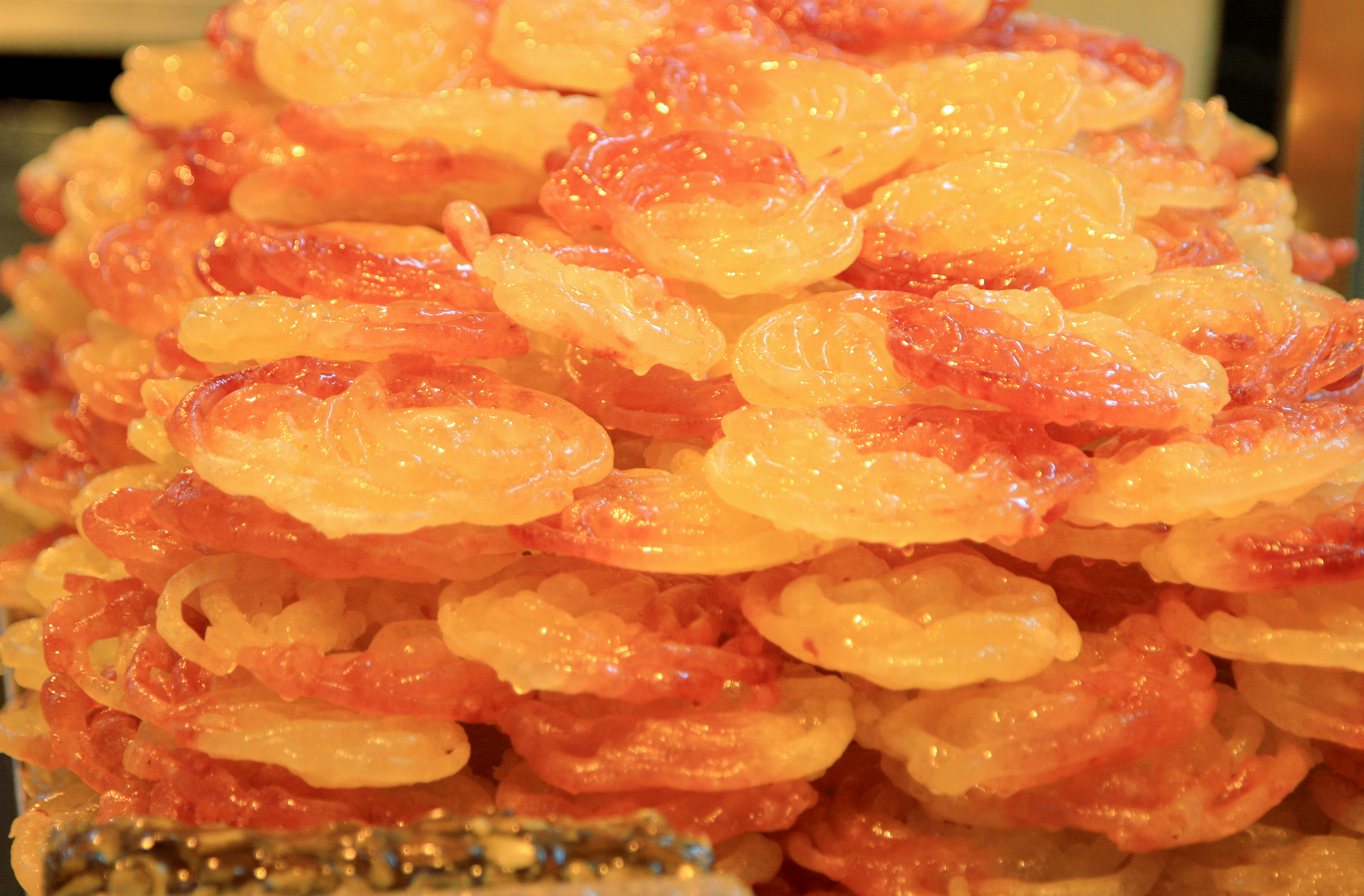
Mshabbak in Jerusalem, with food coloring

=== Maghreb ===
Tunisian zalabiyeh

In North Africa, zalabiyeh was often made with yoghurt added to the dry ingredients.

They are known as zlebia in Tunisian cuisine, jalebie in the Philippines, zülbiya in Azerbaijan, gwaramari in Nepal and jilapi (or Jalebi) in India.

Maghrebi shebakia, which is made from flour and water that are fried and dipped in honey, is another modern dessert likely influenced by medieval zalabiyeh.

== See also ==
- List of fried dough foods
- List of desserts
- Sfenj
- Murukku
- Lokma
