= Puff-puff =

African fried dough snack and pastry

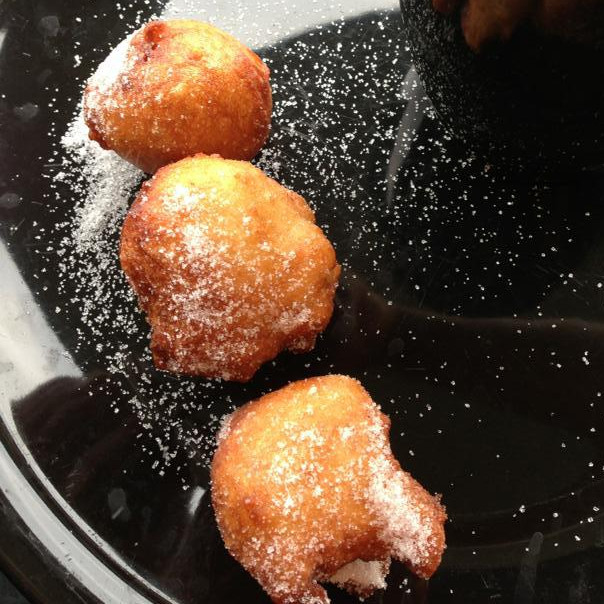
- Type: Doughnut
- Course: Snack
- Place of origin: Nigeria
- Main ingredients: Flour, yeast, sugar, salt, butter, water, eggs, vegetable oil
- Variations: Boflot, kala, mikate, togbei, beignet dougoup

Puff-puff is a traditional snack made of fried dough and eaten across West and Central Africa. The name "puff-puff" is from Nigeria; as listed below, many other names and varieties of the pastry exist.

Puff-puffs are generally made of dough containing flour, yeast, sugar, butter, salt, water and eggs (which are optional), and deep-fried in vegetable oil to a golden-brown color. Baking powder can be used as a replacement for yeast, but yeast is a better option. After frying, puff-puffs can be rolled in sugar. Like the French beignet and the Italian zeppole, puff-puffs can be rolled in any spice or flavoring such as cinnamon, vanilla and nutmeg. They may be served with a fruit dip of strawberry or raspberry.

== Varieties and other names ==
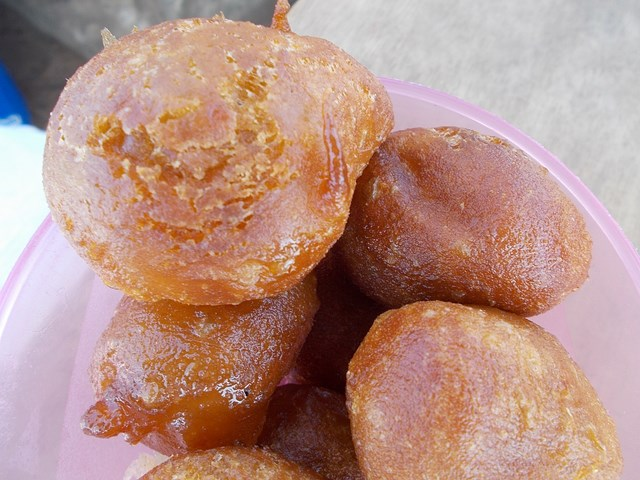
Botokoin, from Togolese cuisine

In Francophone West Africa it is known as gato in Guinea and Mali (from the French gateau) and beignet in Senegal and Cameroon, as well as in The Gambia. A common Senegalese variety uses millet flour rather than wheat. Cameroonians accompany beignets with beans.

Other names for the dish include buffloaf (or bofrot) in Ghana, botokoin in Togo, bofloto in the Ivory Coast, mikate in Congo, micate or bolinho in Angola, fungasa in Chad, legemat in Sudan, kala in Liberia, and vetkoek, amagwinya, or magwinya in South Africa, Botswana and Zimbabwe, and burmasa in Burkina Faso. The prominence of this dish stretches even to the southern and eastern edges of Africa, where it is mostly known as mandazi.

A similar dish can be found in Tonga, where it is known as keke‘isite (literally, yeast cake). The recipe is almost identical to that of puff-puff; however, it is sometimes fried in shortening or drippings instead of vegetable oil.

== See also ==
- Lokma
- Bolinho de chuva
- Boortsog
- Buñuelo
- Chin chin
- Gulab jamun
- Kuli-kuli
- List of doughnut varieties
- Loukoumades
- Mandazi
- Oliebol
- Beignet
