= Eid il-Burbara =

Middle Eastern Christian holiday

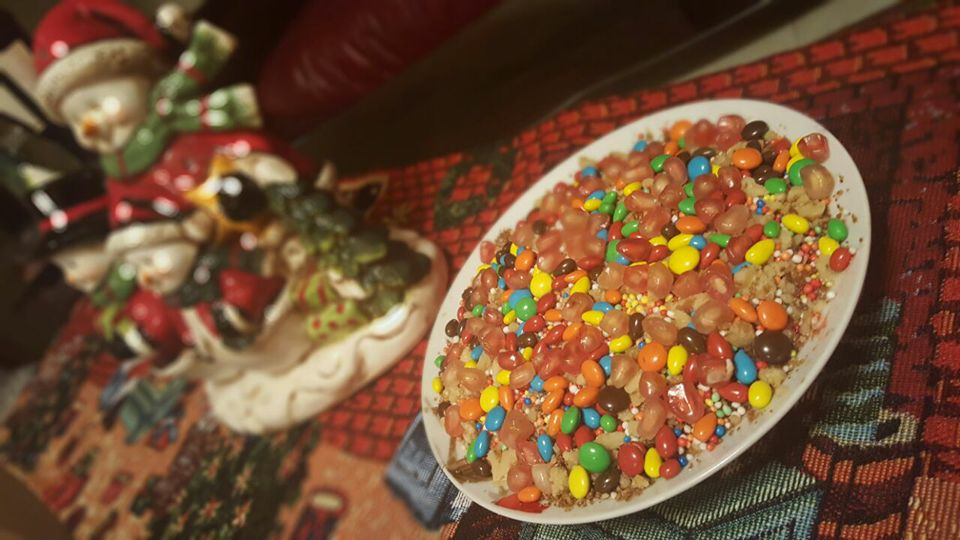
- A Burbara dish
- Observed by: Christians and Alawites in Lebanon; Syria; Palestine; Jordan; Turkey; Georgia
- Type: Religious
- Celebrations: cooking traditional food, wearing costumes, chants/hymns, decorations
- Date: 4 December
- Next time: 4 December 2026

Eid il-Burbara or Saint Barbara's Day (Arabic: عيد البربارة), and also called the Feast of Saint Barbara, is a holiday annually celebrated on 17 December (Gregorian calendar) or 4 December (Julian calendar) amongst Middle Eastern Christians in Lebanon, Syria, Jordan, Palestine and Turkey (Hatay Province). It is also celebrated as Barbaroba (ბარბარობა) amongst Christians in Georgia. Beyond its observance within Christian communities, Eid il-Burbara is also celebrated among the Alawite communities in certain regions.

Its celebration shares many elements with Hallowe'en, though coming from a much earlier tradition, and unrelated to the feast of the dead. Traditionally, adults and children wearing disguise go around houses in the villages dancing and singing the story of Saint Barbara; and in each house, they are offered food (and sometimes money) specially prepared for that feast. The general belief amongst Levantine Christians is that Saint Barbara disguised herself as many different characters to elude the Romans who were persecuting her.

== Traditions ==
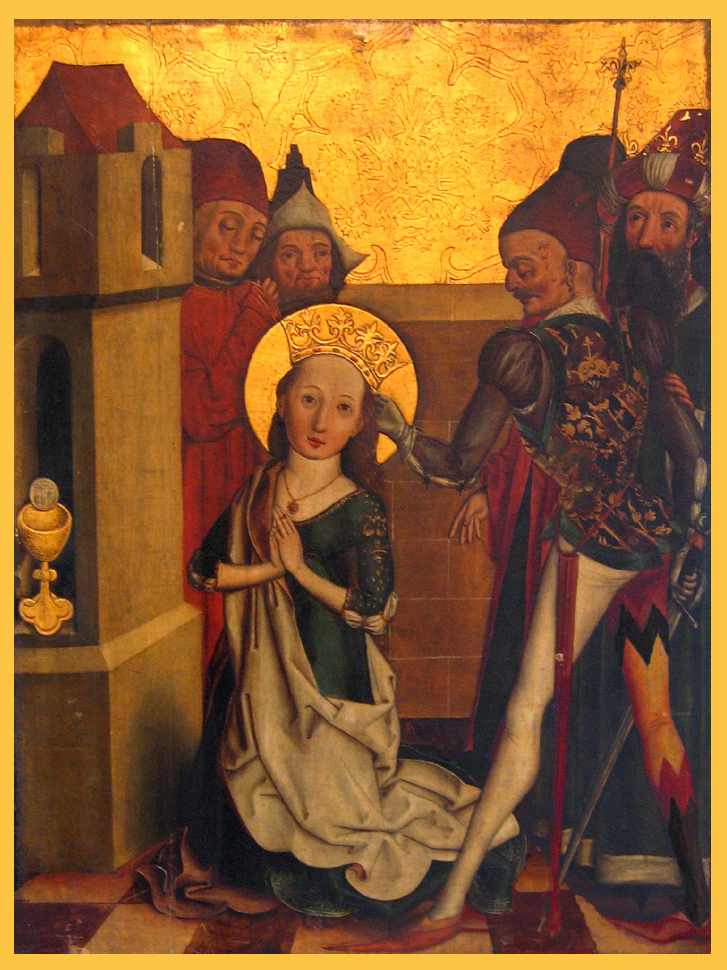
St Barbara

The traditional food made on this feast is Burbara, a bowl of boiled wheat grains, pomegranate seeds, raisins, anise, and sugar, which is originally from the Christian village of Aboud in Palestine. It is offered to children who go from one house to another in costumes. The dish Burbara dates back to at least the 19th century.

In the Middle East, Middle Eastern Christians cook a dough that is filled with walnuts or cheese, called Qatayef. Other popular traditional holiday foods include awameh and zalabiyeh. Heavy traffic occurs in bakeries because of people buying the traditional food for this holiday. Children go trick or treating while singing a special song for Eid il-Burbara.

A common practice in Lebanon on Eid il-Burbara finds its source in the story of Saint Barbara who, it was believed was miraculously saved from persecution while fleeing: She ran through freshly planted wheat fields, which grew instantly to cover her path.

This miracle is celebrated symbolically by planting wheat seeds (or chick peas, barley grains, beans, lentils, etc.) in cotton wool on Saint Barbara's feast day. The seeds germinate and grow up to around six inches in time for Christmas, when the shoots are used to decorate the nativity scene usually placed below the Christmas tree.

The Souk el Tayeb in Beirut celebrates this festival every year.

== See also ==
- Geography of Halloween
- Kollyva
- Lebanese Greek Orthodox Christians
- Christianity in the Middle East
- Maronites
