= Asfanakhyh =

Arab dish

Asfanakhia
- Alternative names: أسفاناخية
- Region or state: Arab world

Asfanakhia (Arabic: أسفاناخية) is an Arab dish of cut meat with spinach and chickpeas.

== History ==
It was mentioned in Al-Tabikh in 1225 by Muhammad ibn al-Hasan al-Baghdadi.

== See also ==
- Arab cuisine
