= Richard Visser =

Dutch pastry chef

Coordinates: 51.91744°N 4.45435°E

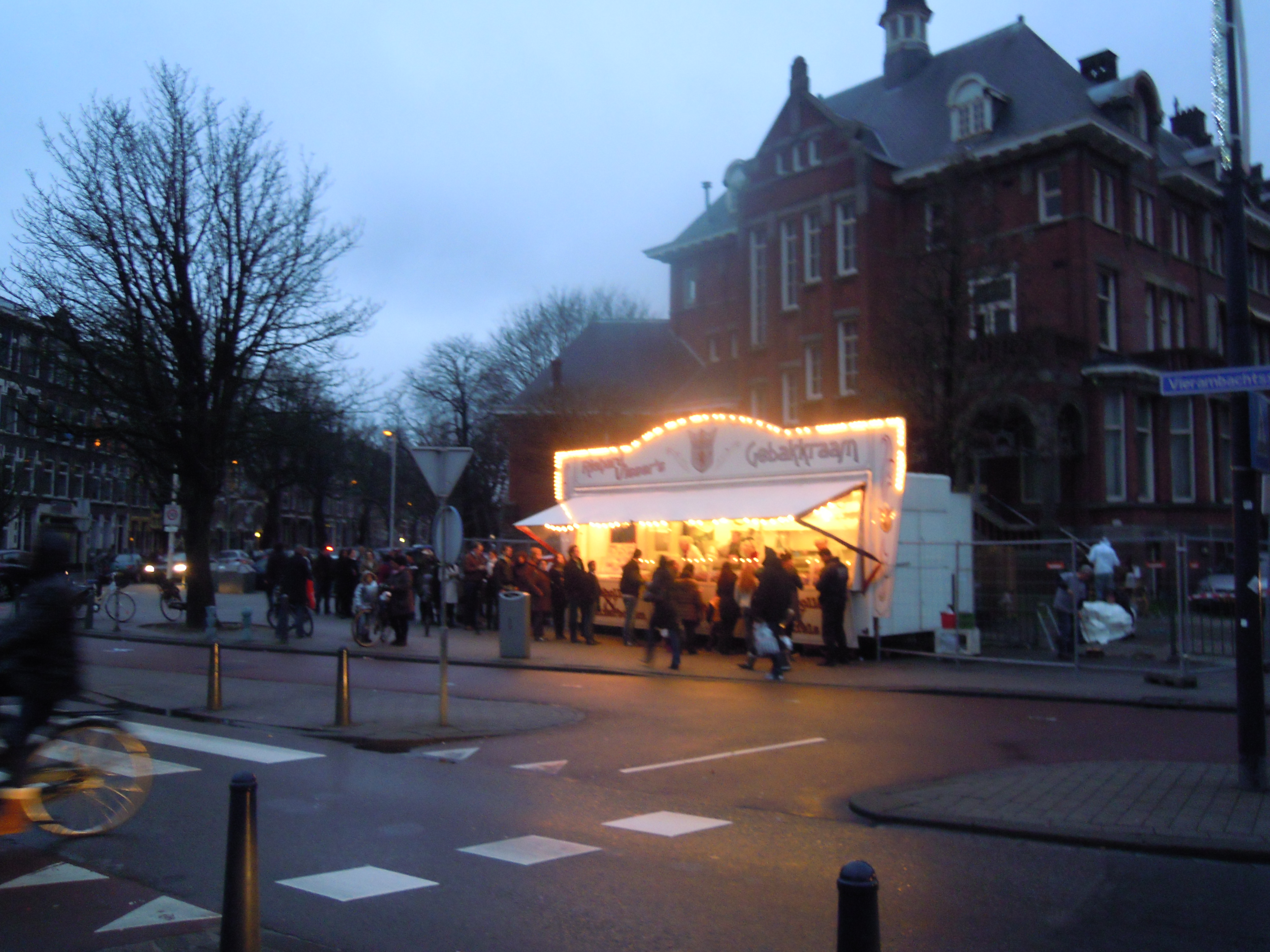
Richard Visser's oliebollen stand in Rotterdam on New Year's Eve 2011

Richard Visser (1968/1969) is a Dutch pastry chef who runs a pastry stand (Dutch: Richard Visser's Gebakkraam) located on the corner of the Heemraadssingel and the Vierambachtsstraat in Rotterdam, which mainly sells oliebollen. In 2011, his oliebollen were named the best in the Netherlands by the Algemeen Dagblad national newspaper in their AD-Oliebollentest; this was his eighth win in nineteen years. He won again in 2013.

== See also ==
- List of pastry chefs
