= Bolinho de chuva =

Dessert in Brazil

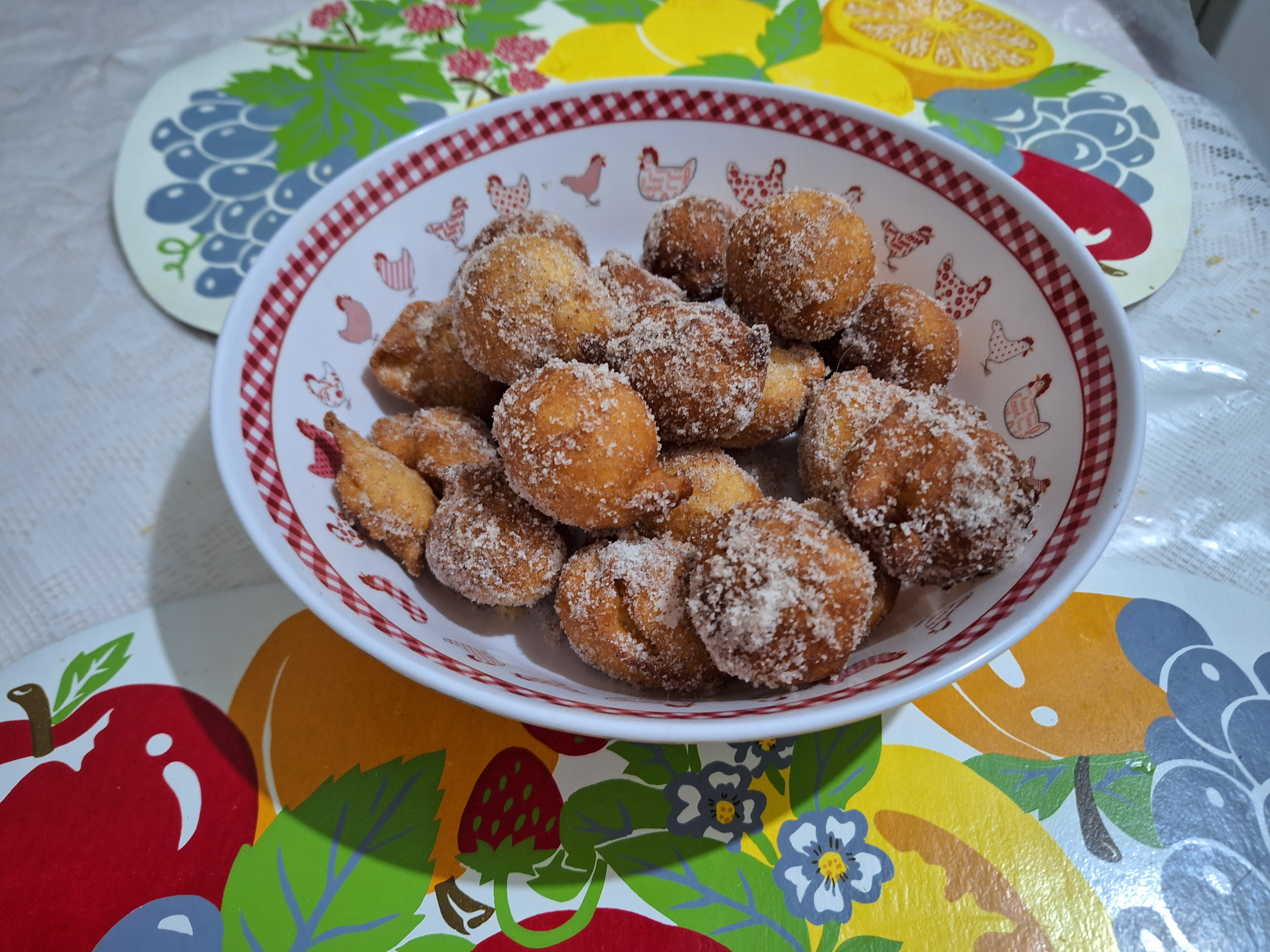
- A bowl of Brazilian bolinho de chuva
- Type: Doughnut, dumpling
- Region or state: Portugal and Brazil
- Main ingredients: Flour, egg yolks, baking powder

Bolinho de chuva (European Portuguese pronunciation: [buˈɫiɲu dɨ ˈʃuvɐ]; Brazilian Portuguese pronunciation: [boˈliɲu dʒi ˈʃuvɐ], lit. 'rain pastry') is a dessert both in Portugal and Brazil. It is made from flour, eggs, milk and baking powder or baking soda. The doughnuts are deep-fried and sprinkled with cinnamon and sugar. The name refers to the raindrop shape the batter makes when it hits the oil and to the idea that it is a good rainy-day project to make the dish.

The popularity of the bolinho de chuva was enhanced in Brazil by the book series Sítio do Picapau Amarelo, where Aunt Nastácia always made them for Pedrinho, Narizinho and the rag doll Emília.

== See also ==
- Doughnut holes
- Gulgula, a similar sweet dish from India
- Lokma, a similar sweet dish from Turkey
- Oliebol, a similar dish from the Netherlands
- Struffoli, a similar fried dough dish from Naples, Italy
