= Oliebol =

Traditional Dutch and Belgian food

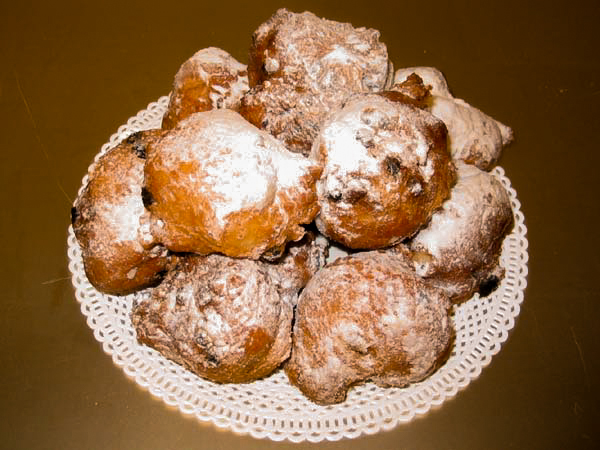
- Type: Doughnut
- Place of origin: Netherlands, Belgium
- Main ingredients: Flour, eggs, yeast, some salt, milk, baking powder; usually sultanas, currants, raisins; zest or succade
- Variations: Appelbeignet

An oliebol (Dutch pronunciation: [ˈoːlibɔl]; plural oliebollen; West Frisian: oaljebol or oaljekoek; see more below) is a Dutch beignet, a variety of doughnut that is traditionally eaten on New Year's Eve. People often eat it with raisins baked inside and with powdered sugar on top. Another variation is made with apple inside instead of raisins. There are similar foods all around the world, including the Samoan panikeke, eaten mostly with jam or butter on top.

== Name ==
They are called oliebollen (literally 'oil spheres') or smoutballen (literally 'lard balls') in the Netherlands, smoutebollen (literally: 'lard spheres') in Flanders and croustillons (loosely 'crispies') in Wallonia, Schmalzkugeln (same meaning as in Belgian Dutch smoutebollen) in Eastern Belgium German. In France, with croustillons they are also commonly called beignets rapides (literally 'fast beignets') and croustillons hollandais (loosely 'Dutch crispies'). In out-of-Belgium German, they are called Ölkugel (same meaning as in Dutch oliebollen), Püpperchen (informal for 'puppets' or 'babies') and Pupperle (same meaning, especially used in Alsace for these ones), Silvesterfutschen (loosely 'messed up Saint Sylvesters') in Northern Germany, and Gebackene Mäuse (loosely 'fried mice' or 'baked mice') in Austrian German. In English they are more commonly known as Dutch doughnuts or dutchies. In Italy, they are called many different things depending on the region: bombolini fritti, ficattole, bignoli, frittoli/fritole/fritule, sgabei, bignet, panzanelle, coccoli, zonzelle, donzelle, etc. In the region of Istria, which is shared by the countries of Italy, Croatia and Slovenia, a variation of this dish is called fritole, fritule and blinci. In Serbia they are called krofne. In Portugal they are called sonhos ('dreams'). In Indonesia, they are known locally as roti goreng. Also, in Ghana, West Africa, they are known locally as bofrot or bofflot, and in the south of Benin, in the Fon language as yovodocon, i.e. 'white man's dumplings'. In Nigeria, they are known as 'puff puff'. In Iceland they're known as ástarpungar ('love balls'). In Zambia they're known as Chitumbuwa ('fritters').

== Description ==
Oliebollen are a variety of dumpling made by using an ice cream scoop or two spoons to scoop a certain amount of dough and dropping the dough into a deep fryer filled with hot oil (or once with hot lard, thus some traditional local names). In this way, a sphere-shaped oliebol emerges. Oliebollen are traditionally eaten on New Year's Eve and at funfairs. In wintertime, they are also sold in the street at mobile stalls.

The dough is made from flour, eggs, yeast, salt, milk, baking powder and usually sultanas, currants, raisins and sometimes zest or succade (candied fruit). A notable variety is the appelbeignet which contains only a slice of apple, but different from oliebollen, the dough should not rise for at least an hour. Oliebollen are usually served with powdered sugar.

In Flanders the "oliebol" is also called "smoutebol" because it is often cooked in animal fat (especially lard) rather than vegetable oil. Another difference between the Dutch oliebol and the Flemish smoutebol is that the smoutebol is usually not filled in contrast to the Dutch oliebol. The filling of the oliebol could consist of raisins, currants and apple, other ingredients can be added, such as succade, pieces of orange or whipped cream.

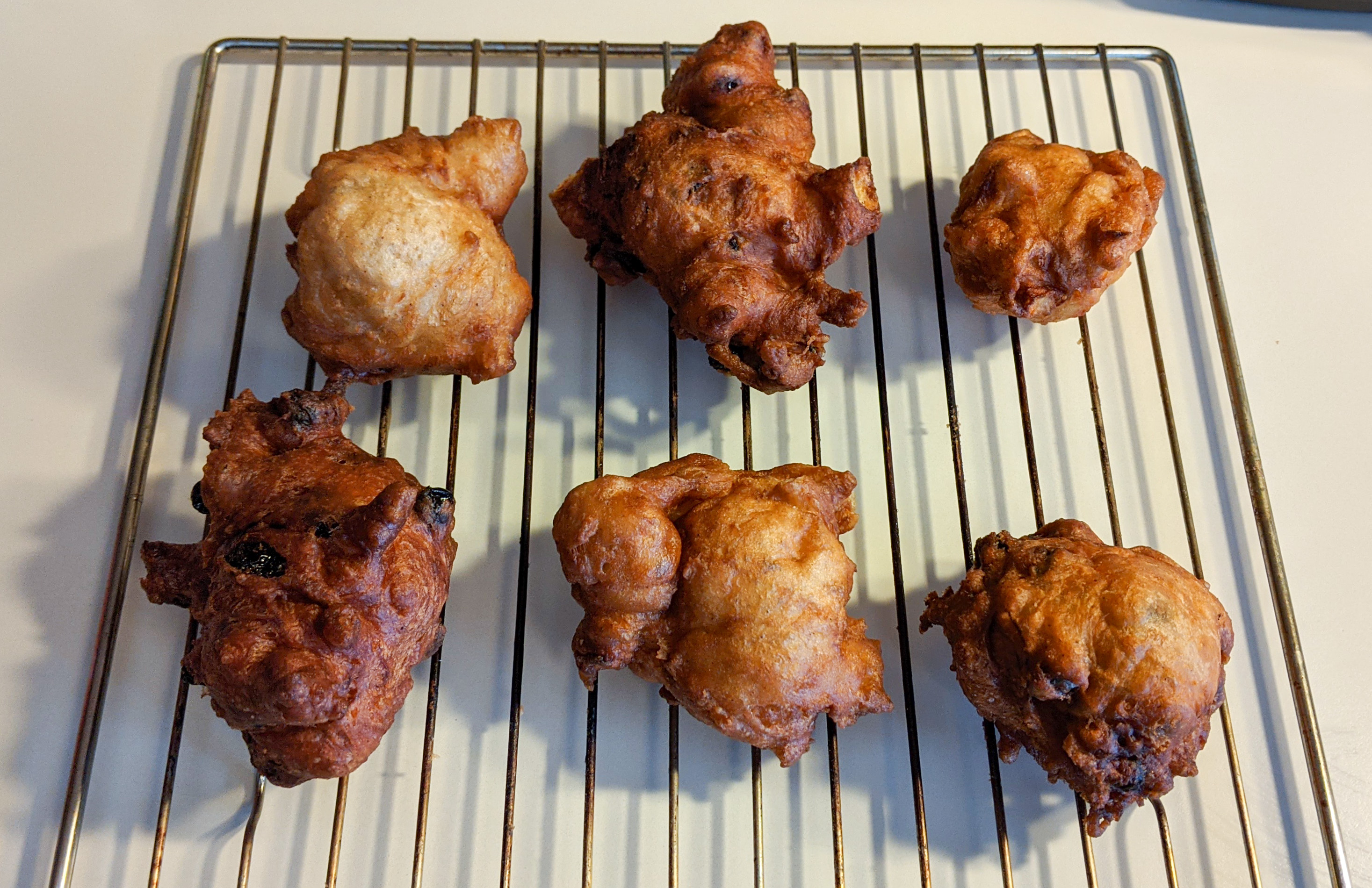
Freshly fried raisin and apple oliebollen, Fenwick, Ontario, Canada.

== Origin ==
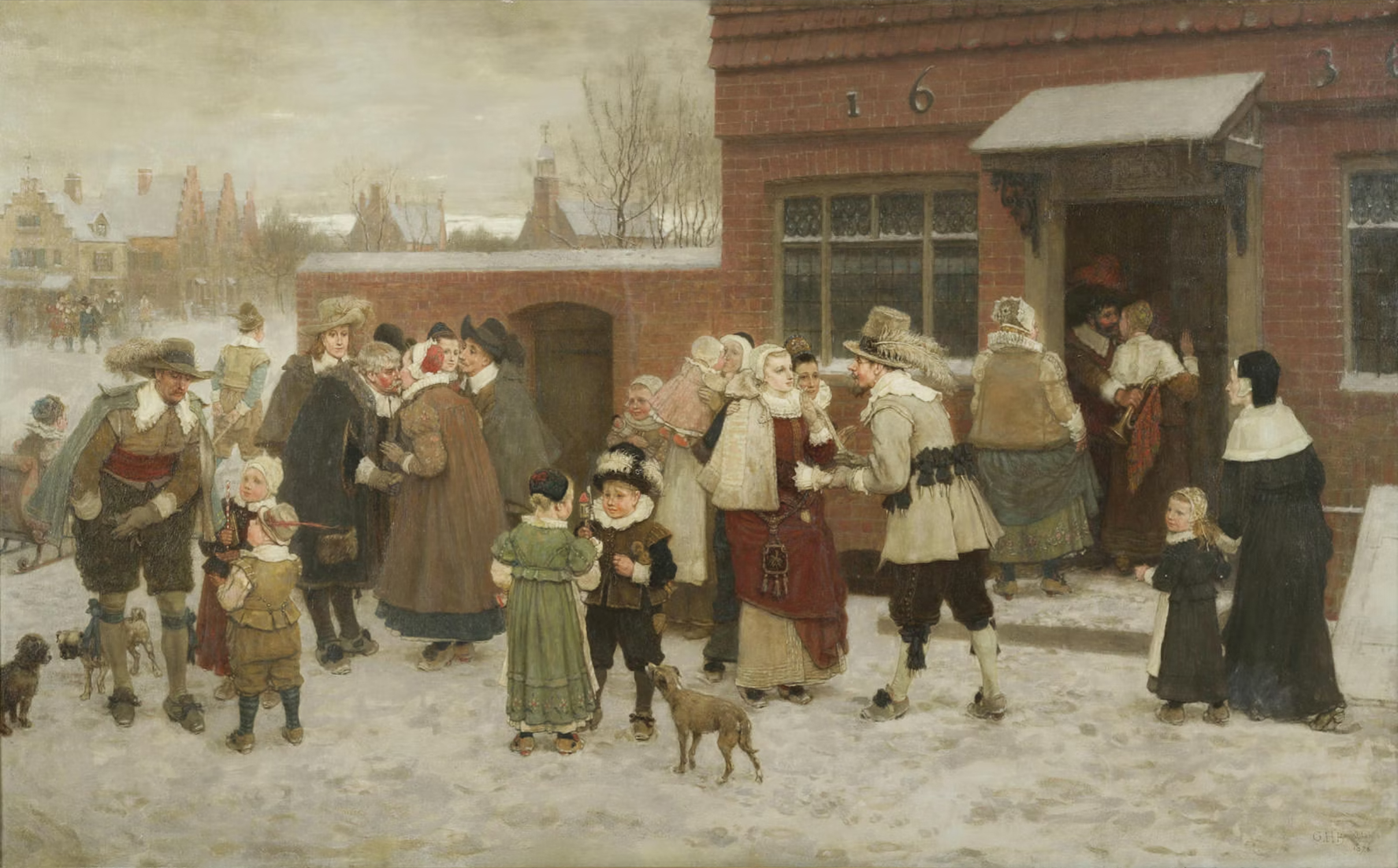
Party For New Year's Day in New Amsterdam, 1636. The boy in the center has two oliebollen

The origins of oliebollen are not entirely clear. They are said by some to have been first eaten by Germanic tribes in the Netherlands during the Yule, the period between December 21 and January 2 where such baked goods were used. It has also been speculated that they were introduced to the Netherlands in the 15th century by Portuguese Sephardi Jewish immigrants; the food being related to the Jewish sufganiyah traditionally eaten on Hanukkah. The earliest discovered recipe of oliekoecken ("oil cookies", the direct precursor of the oliebol) came from the 1667 Dutch book De verstandige kock "The sensible cook".

== Variations ==
=== From oliekoek to oliebol ===
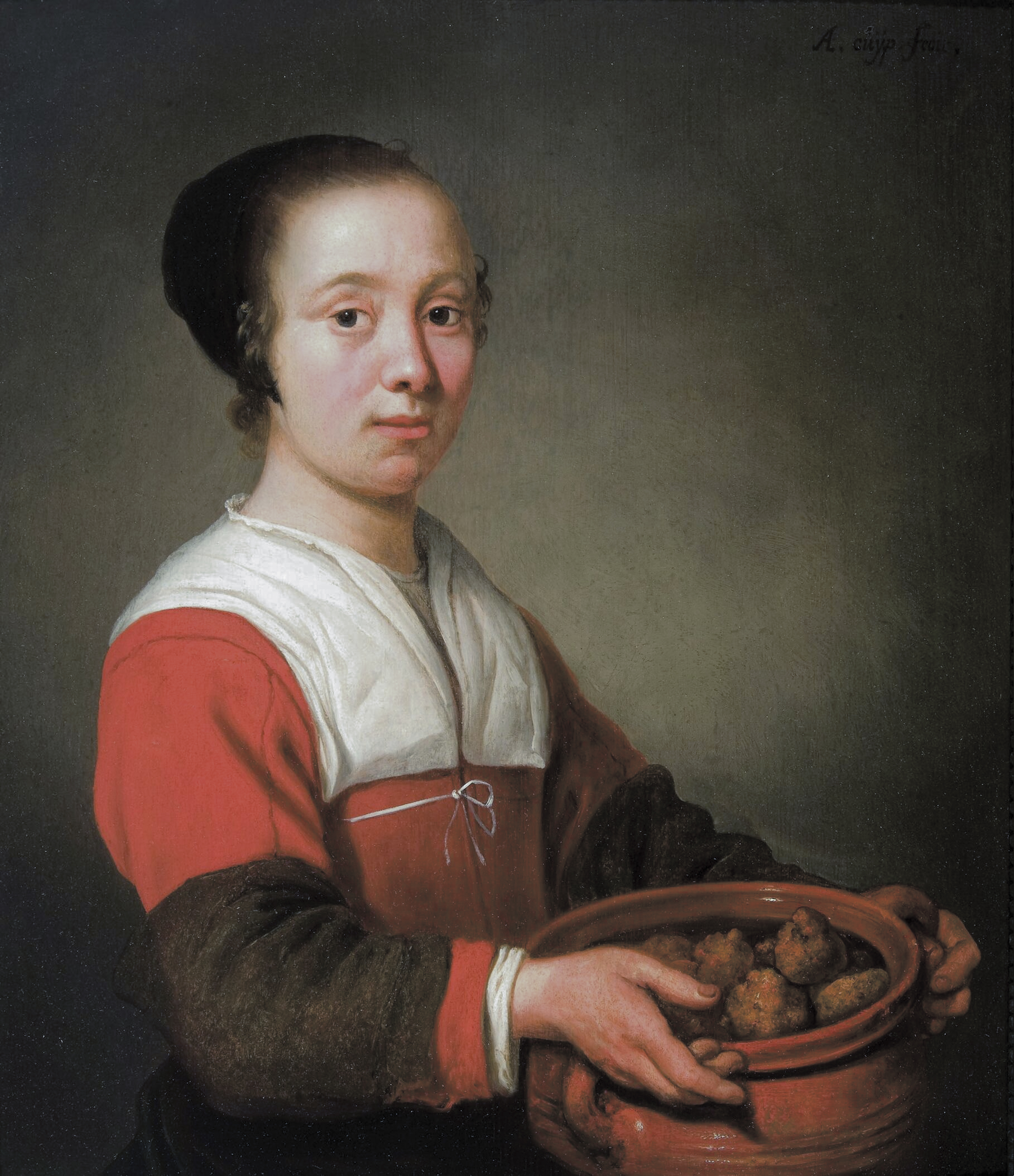
Young woman with a cooking pot filled with oliebollen (Aelbert Cuyp, ca. 1652)

For centuries the Dutch ate oliekoek ("oil cookie"), an old name for oliebol ("oil ball"). The Oliebollen in this painting from around 1652 are very similar to today's oliebol. At that time, they were baked in lard or rapeseed oil. During the nineteenth century the word "oliebol" started to be used more. The 1868 edition of the Van Dale dictionary included word "oliebol", whereas the rival "Woordenboek der Nederlandsche taal" didn't include it until 1896, stating that "oliekoek" is a more commonly used term, but a major shift in usage occurred: from the early twentieth century the word "oliebol" became the popular word, while "oliekoek" was no longer in use.

=== Croustillons ===
A very similar type of oliebol can also be found in the Walloon part of Belgium, Brussels and northern France. Croustillons are deep fried dough balls served hot and liberally sprinkled with powdered sugar. They are usually served in a paper cone with a little plastic fork to eat them with. They are typically found at fairgrounds in Belgium and in Lille, France.

== Oliebollentest contest ==
From 1993 to 2017 Dutch newspaper Algemeen Dagblad held an annual highly publicized oliebollentest at the end of each year. In 2012, the bakery of Willy Olink from Maarssen won the test. In 2013 Richard Visser won the test for the ninth time in twenty years which is currently the record for the highest number of wins by one person. The test, alongside similar tests for french fries and herring, ended in 2018 due to criticism over a lack of objectivity and unnecessarily harsh criticism. Fans of the treat continued reviewing oliebollen from all over the country by themselves, compiling their ratings on a website.

== See also ==
- List of doughnut varieties
- Poffertjes – Traditional Dutch batter treat
- Vetkoek – South African fried dough bread
- Doughnut – Sweet food made from deep-fried dough
- Fritter – Deep-fried sweet or savoury snack
- Malassada – Portuguese-style fried doughnut
- Æbleskiver – Danish traditional batter cakes, a similar Danish dish
