= Lakhamari =

Nepalese confection

Lakhamaari
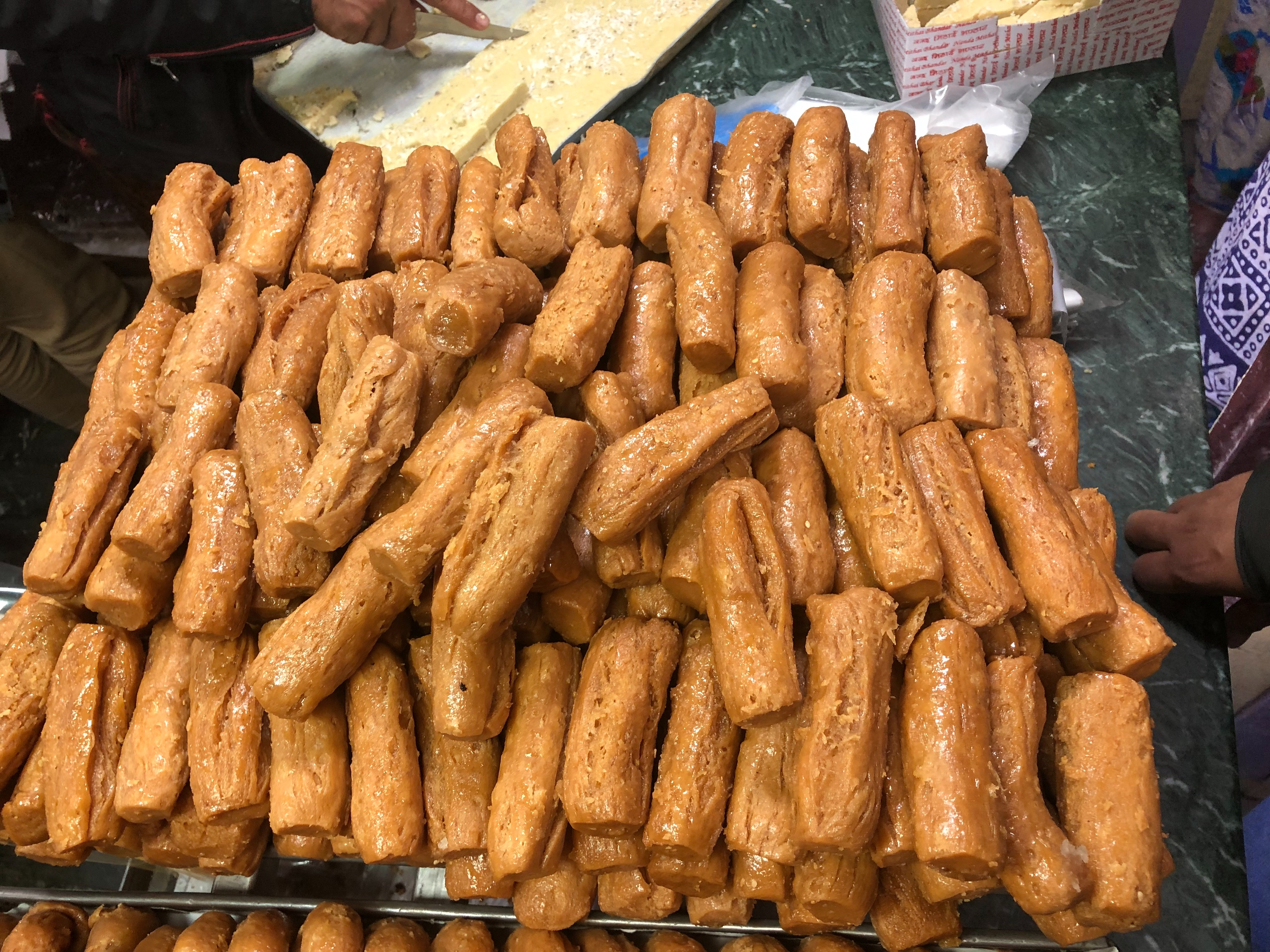
- Type: Confectionery
- Place of origin: Nepal
- Region or state: Kathmandu
- Main ingredients: Flour, sugar, butter

Lākhāmaari (Nepalese: लाखामरि) is a type of sweet of Newars. It is made of gram flour, sugar, butter and other ingredients. It can be made in different shapes and is named differently depending upon the shapes. It is customarily given to guests of marriage ceremony in some Newar subculture. Prior to marriage, the groom has to provide lakhamaari to the bride's family, which they will send along with the invitation card for marriage. However, lakhamaaris will only be sent to close relatives. Lakhamaari can be stored dry for many days.
