= Lokma =

Deep-fried dough pastries

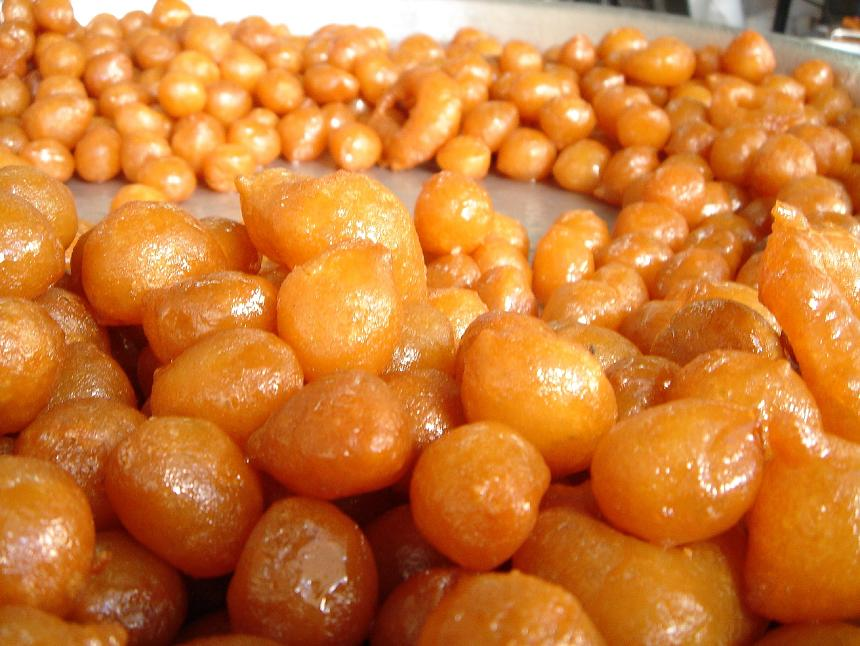
- Alternative names: Loukoumas, loukoumades, luqma crispella
- Type: Fried dough
- Place of origin: Mesopotamia
- Main ingredients: Yeast-leavened dough, oil, sugar syrup or honey
- Variations: Zalabiyeh Owaymat Enkrides

Lokma (derived from the 13th century Arab dessert luqmat al-qādi) is a dessert made of leavened and deep-fried dough balls, soaked in syrup or honey, and sometimes coated with cinnamon or other ingredients. The dish was described as early as the 13th century by al-Baghdadi as luqmat al-qādi (لُقْمَةُ ٱلْقَاضِيِ), "judge's morsels".

== Etymology ==
The Arabic word luqma (لُقْمَةٌ) (plural luqmāt), means morsel, mouthful, or bite. The dish was known as luqmat al-qādi (لُقْمَةُ ٱلْقَاضِيِ) or "judge's morsels" in 13th-century Arabic cookery books, and the word luqma or loqma by itself has come to refer to it. The Turkish name for the dish, lokma, is derived from the Arabic, as is the Greek name loukoumádes (λουκουμάδες).

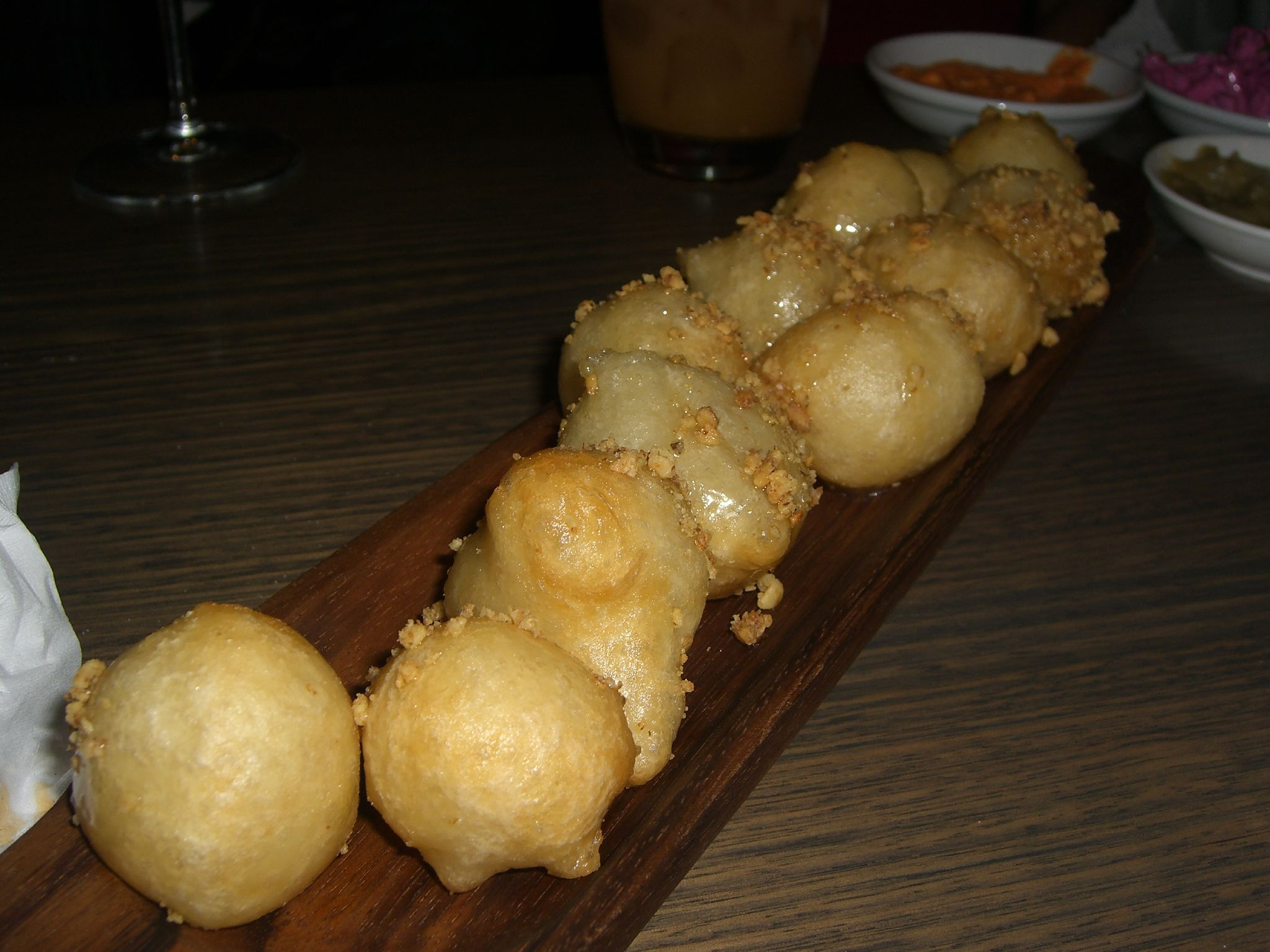
Greek loukoumádes served at a pub in Melbourne, Australia

== Preparation ==
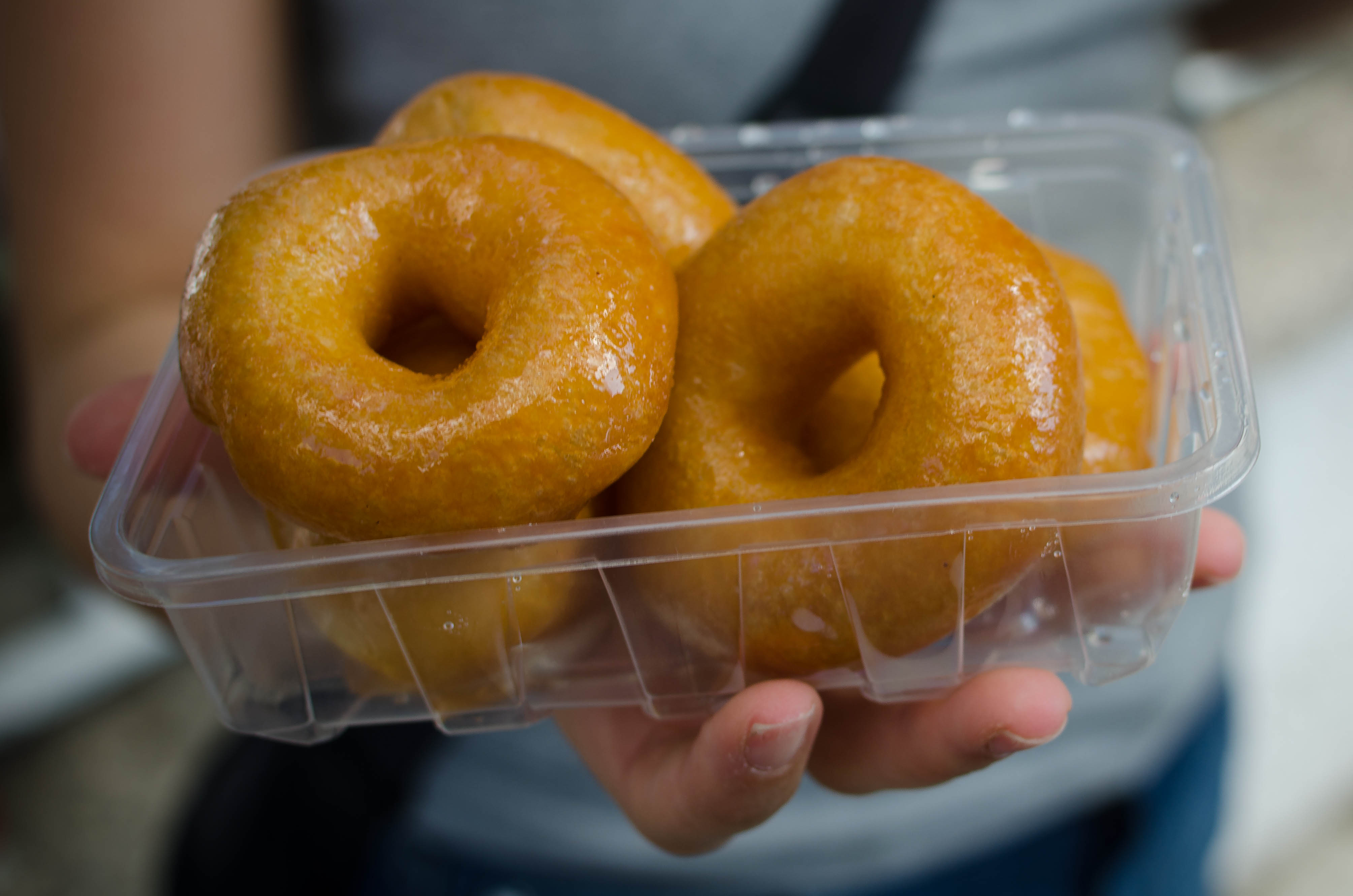
Doughnut-shaped lokma in İzmir, Turkey

The thick and smooth yeast batter rises and has a very soft and foamy consistency. The batter is usually dropped into hot oil and fried to a golden brown color, but some are doughnut-shaped. Lokma are served with honey and, occasionally, cinnamon.

Traditionally, the batter was leavened with yeast but modern variations sometimes use baking powder.

== Regional varieties and their histories ==
=== Arab countries ===
The recipe for luqmat al-qadi, yeast-leavened dough boiled in oil and doused in honey or sugar syrup with rosewater, dates back to at least the early medieval period and the 13th-century Abbasid Caliphate, where it is mentioned in several known cookery books of the time. It is also mentioned in the One Thousand and One Nights, in the story The Porter and the Three Ladies of Baghdad. The explorer and scholar Ibn Battuta in the 14th century encountered the dish he knew as luqaymat al-qadi at a dinner in Multan (modern-day Pakistan) during his travels in medieval India, where his hosts called it al-hashimi. According to food historian Gil Marks, Arab and Ottoman empires contributed to the spread lokma.

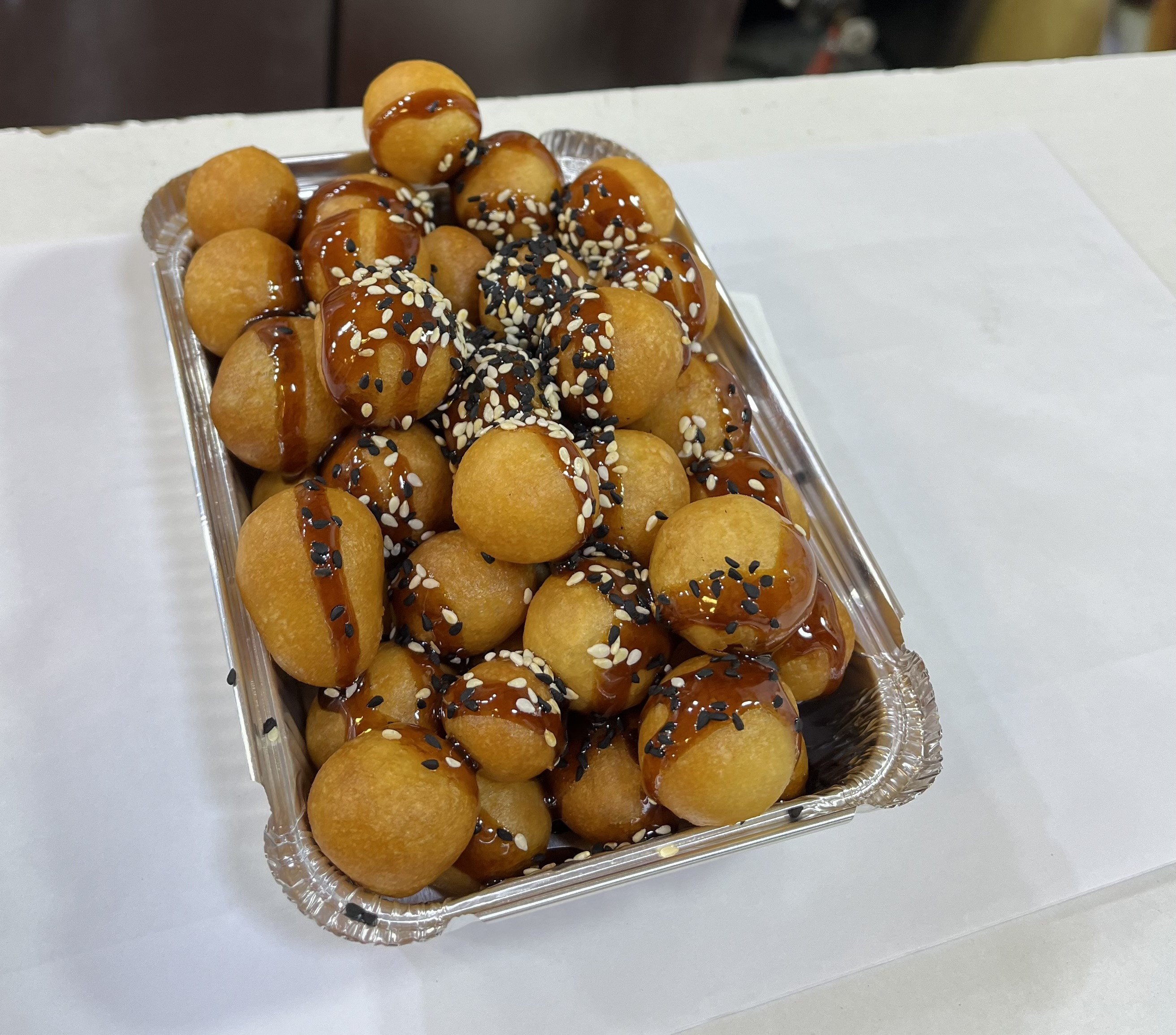
Lugaimat with sesame toppings sold in Riyadh, Saudi Arabia

Today, in Iraq, it is called lokma or luqaymat (diminutive plural of luqma lit. 'small bites'), and they differ both in size and taste across the country. While in Arab countries of the Persian Gulf, lugaimat, sometimes spiced with cardamom or saffron, are little changed from the 13th-century recipes, in parts of the Middle East they may also be called awameh (عوامة), meaning "floater", or zalabya (زلابيا), with numerous spelling variations, though the latter term may also refer to a similar dish made in a long spiral or straight baton shape. They are traditionally included in times of religious observances; for example in the Levant by Muslims at Ramadan, Jews at Hanukkah, and Christians at Epiphany alike.

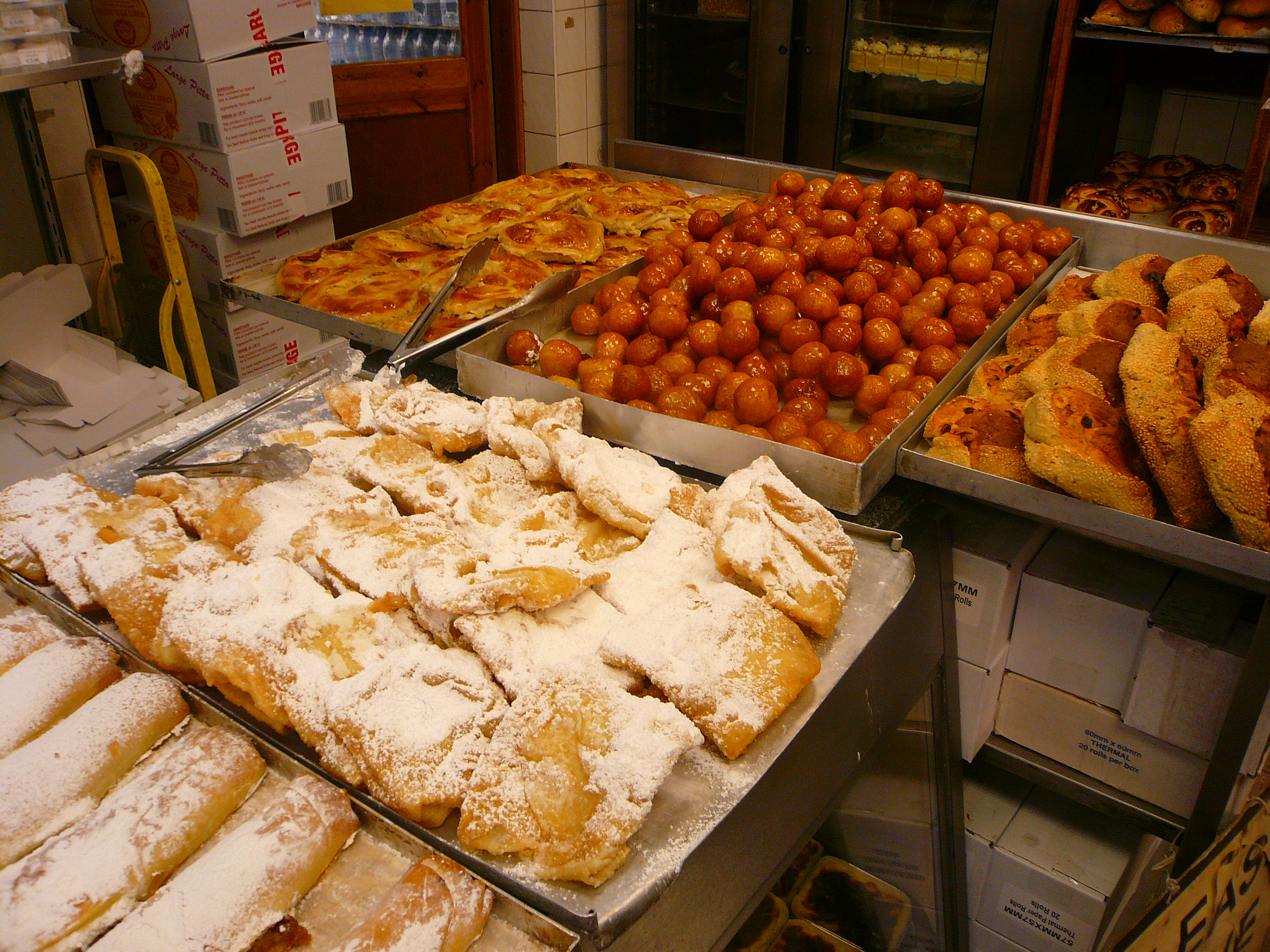
Lokma sold at a pastry shop in Cyprus

=== Greece and Cyprus ===
The dish called loukoumádes (λουκουμάδες) is a mainstay of Greek cooking, in particular in the south of Greece, and is a popular street food served with any combination of honey, cinnamon, walnuts and chocolate sauce.

There is evidence that loukoumades originated from "enkrides", a dough fried in oil and eaten with honey in Ancient Greece. This treat continued to be popular in the Byzantine era, particularly during Lent, as the absence of dairy or meat meant that it met the requirements of Orthodox fasting (Greek: νήστεις, nēsteis).

References to deep fried donuts soaked in honey syrup, called "enkrides" (Greek: ἐγκρίς, plural ἐγκρίδες), are found in several Ancient Greek texts including works by Archestratus, Aeschylus, Steischorus, Epicharmus, Nikophon, Aristophanes and Pherecrates. In The Deipnosophists, Athenaeus describes enkrides as "cakes boiled in oil" and "seasoned in honey".

Loukoumades have also been likened to "charisioi" (Ancient Greek: χᾰρῑ́σῐοι) . They were said to be given as prizes at ancient drinking games . Aristophanes and Eubulus both describe charisios as "grace" or "joy" cakes (from the Greek word χαρά meaning joy), eaten at nocturnal festivals called "pannichis" (Greek: Παννυχίς). The recipe for charisios has not been recorded.

In the Byzantine period, enkrides, or loukoumades, were popular during Lent. As a sweet treat made with only flour, yeast and water, and sweetened with honey, they met the requirements of Orthodox fasting and were also popular in monasteries. Along with halva, they are considered an example of the creative inventiveness of Orthodox Christians in this period.

This term was also used by the Romaniotes (Greek Jews) as the name for loukoumades, who call them zvingoi (σβίγγοι) and make them as Hanukkah treats.

Pontic Greeks who migrated from the Black Sea as a result of the Lausanne Conference call them tsirichta (τσιριχτά).Tsirichta are served at Pontian weddings. The pastry is called loukoumádes (λουκουμάδες) and lokmádes (λοκμάδες) in Cypriot Greek. They are commonly served spiced with cinnamon in a honey syrup and can be sprinkled lightly with powdered sugar.

=== Turkey ===
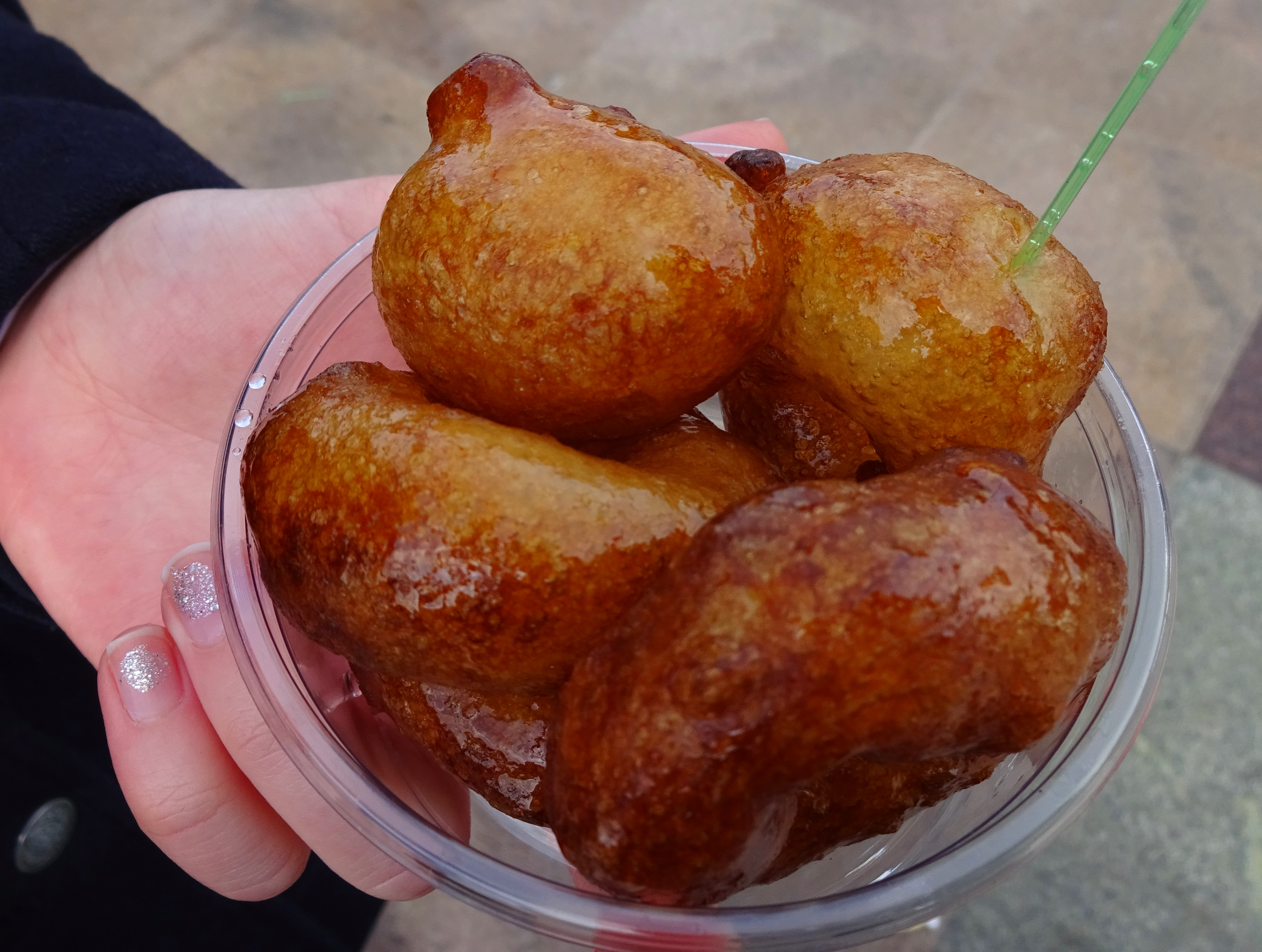
Lokma sold as street food near the Galata Bridge in Istanbul

There are different types of lokma in Turkey. Dessert lokma are made with flour, sugar, yeast and salt, fried in oil and later bathed in syrup or honey. In some regions of Turkey lokma are eaten with cheese, similar to breakfast bagels. İzmir lokması are doughnut-shaped with a hole in the middle. The spherical one is called the palace lokma (Turkish: Saray lokması). In the Güdül-Ayaş regions of Ankara, there is a type of lokma known as bırtlak.

Traditionally, forty days after someone dies, close relatives and friends of the deceased cook large quantities of lokma for neighbours and passersby. People form queues to get a plate and recite a prayer for the soul of the deceased after eating the lokma.

== See also ==
- List of doughnuts
- Bolinho de chuva
- Kemal Pasha dessert
- Boortsog
- Unni appam
- Puff-puff
