= Priscilla Mary Işın =

Turkish Ottoman-cuisine historian (born 1951)

- Born: 1951
- Citizenship: Turkey

Academic background
- Education: York University

Academic work
- Discipline: Food historian
- Sub-discipline: Ottoman cuisine

Priscilla Mary Işın is an English food historian specializing in Ottoman cuisine.

== Early life ==
She studied in York University, in the United Kingdom, and after graduating, she moved to Ankara, Turkey, in 1973.

== Awards ==
Her book Gülbeşeker won the Dünya Kitap Gastronomic Book of the Year prize in 2009.

== Works ==
Her essays have been published by outlets like the Los Angeles Times, and in books like Venice and the Ottoman Empire.

=== Books ===
- Isin, Priscilla Mary (12 February 2025). Bountiful Empire: A History of Ottoman Cuisine. Reaktion Books. ISBN 978-1-78023-939-2.
- Isin, Mary (8 January 2013). "Sherbet and Spice: The Complete Story of Turkish Sweets and Desserts". Bloomsbury Academic.
- Unger, Friedrich; Mary Isin, Priscilla (2003). A King's Confectioner in the Orient: Friedrich Unger, Court Confectioner to King Otto I of Greece. Kegan Paul. ISBN 978-0-7103-0936-5.

== Reviews of her works ==
- Armanios, Febe (August 2019). "Priscilla Mary Işın, Bountiful Empire: A History of Ottoman Cuisine (London: Reaktion Books, 2018)". International Journal of Middle East Studies. 51 (3): 495–497. doi:10.1017/S0020743819000485.
