= Ibn Sayyar al-Warraq =

10th-century Arabic author

Abū Muḥammad al-Muẓaffar ibn Naṣr ibn Sayyār al-Warrāq (Arabic: أبو محمد المظفر بن نصر ابن سيار الوراق) was an Iraqi author from Baghdad. He was the compiler of a tenth-century cookbook, the Kitāb al-Ṭabīkh (Arabic: كتاب الطبيخ, The Book of Dishes). This is the earliest known Arabic cookbook. The Kitāb al-Ṭabīkh contains over 600 recipes, divided into 132 chapters.

== See also ==
- Muhammad bin Hasan al-Baghdadi, author of a 13th-century Arabic cookbook by the same name
