= Muhammad bin Hasan al-Baghdadi =

13th century cookbook writer

Muḥammad bin al-Ḥasan bin Muḥammad bin al-Karīm al-Baghdādī
- Born: محمد بن الحسن بن محمد بن الكريم البغدادي
- Other name: al-Baghdadi
- Occupation: writer

Muḥammad bin al-Ḥasan bin Muḥammad bin al-Karīm al-Baghdādī (Arabic: محمد بن الحسن بن محمد بن الكريم البغدادي; d. 1239), usually called simply al-Baghdadi, was the compiler of an early Arab cookbook of the Abbasid period, Kitāb al-Ṭabīḫ (كتاب الطبيخ; The Book of Dishes), written in 1226. The original book contained 160 recipes, and 260 recipes were later added.

== Manuscripts and Turkish translations ==
The only original manuscript of Al-Baghdadi's book survives at Süleymaniye Library in Istanbul, Turkey, and according to Charles Perry, "for centuries, it had been the favorite cook-book of the Turks". Further recipes had been added to the original by Turkish compilers at an unknown date and retitled as Kitâbü’l-Vasfi’l-Et‘ime el-Mu‘tâde, with two of its known three copies found at the Topkapı Palace Library. Eventually, Muhammad ibn Mahmud al-Shirwani, the physician of Sultan Murad II, prepared a Turkish translation of the book adding around 70 contemporary recipes. This translation was published in modern Turkish in 2005, whereas a modern Turkish translation of the original book (co-edited by Charles Perry) was published in 2009.

== See also ==
- List of medieval cookbooks § Arabic
- Ibn Sayyar al-Warraq, author of a 10th-century Arabic cookbook by the same name, Kitāb al-Ṭabīkh

== Bibliography ==
- A.J. Arberry, "A Baghdad cookery-book", Islamic Culture 13 (1939), pp. 21–47 and 189–214. A translation of al-Kitab al-Ṭabīḫ.
- Charles Perry, A Baghdad Cookery Book (Petits Propos Culinaires), Prospect Books, 2006. ISBN 1-903018-42-0. A new translation.
