= Kitāb al-Ṭabīkh (10th-century cookbook) =

The Kitāb al-Ṭabīkh (Arabic: كتاب الطبيخ, lit. 'book of dishes') is the oldest surviving Arabic cookbook, having been written by Ibn Sayyar al-Warraq in the 10th century.

== History ==
Compiled from the recipes of the 8th and 9th century courts of the Abbasid Caliphate in Baghdad, some scholars speculate that al-Warraq may have prepared the manuscript on behalf of a patron, the Hamdanid prince Sayf al-Dawla, who sought to improve the cultural prestige of his own court in Aleppo as the court in Baghdad had started to decline.

Some recipes in the book, like ʿaṣīda (date-sweetened porridge), come from the relatively simple cuisine of the Arabian Peninsula, but the book also contains recipes for fancy stews with Persian names. There is also an entire chapter about nabaṭiyyāt, hearty stews of 'Nabataean' (Iraqi) origin.

== Contents ==
It contains over 600 recipes, divided into 132 chapters. One of the book's manuscripts, now preserved in Istanbul, was owned by the Ayyubid ruler of Egypt al-Salih Najm al-Din Ayyub (1205–1249) and his wife Shajar al-Durr (d. 1257).

== Translations ==
Several partial or full translations in European languages are available:

- Nawal Nasrallah, annotated translation
- Lilia Zaouali, selection of two dozen recipes
- Sabrina Favaro, Italian translation
- David Waines, selection of recipes
