= Half and Half Doughnut Co. =

Defunct restaurant in Seattle, Washington, U.S.

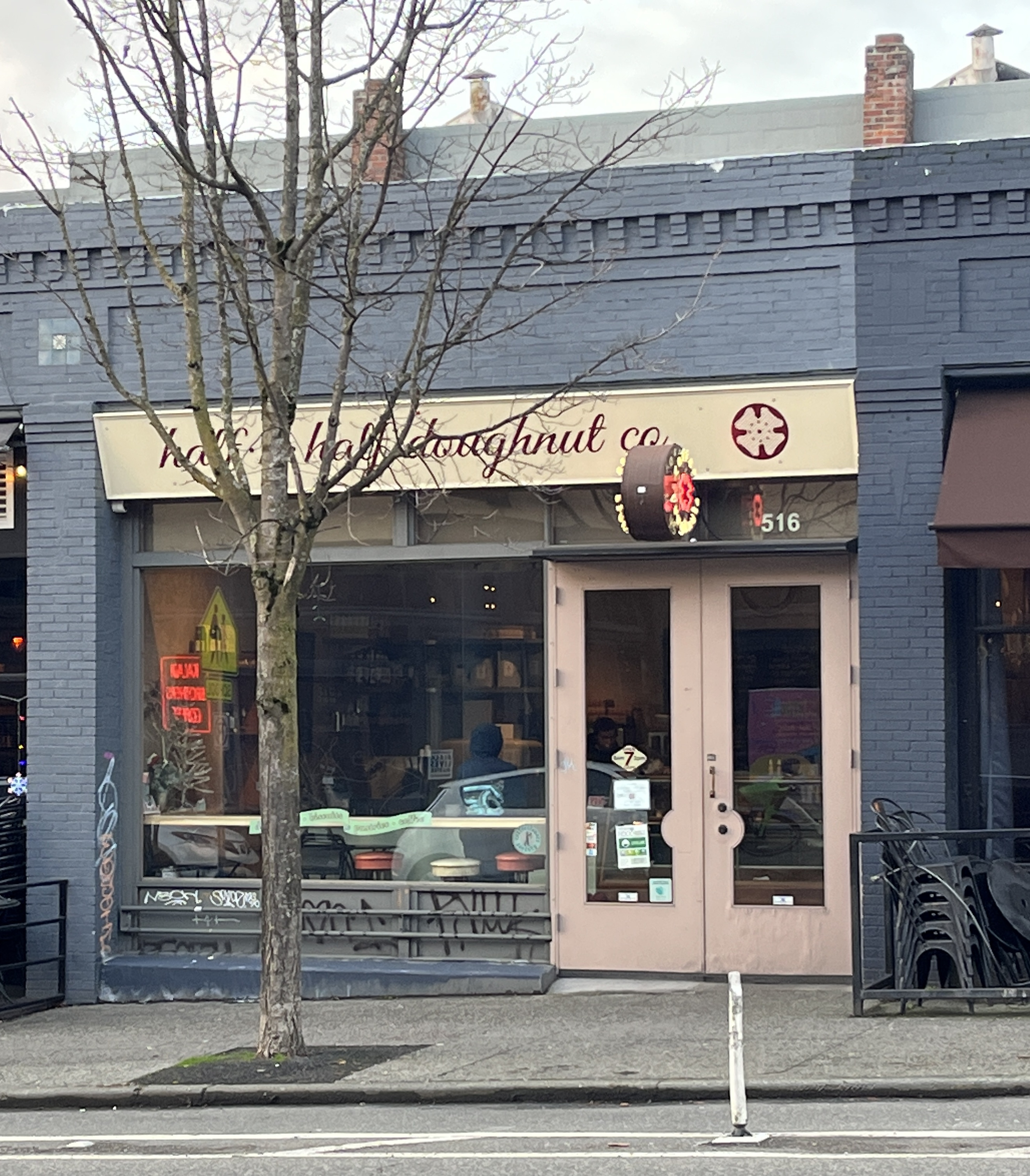
- The shop's exterior in 2023
- Interactive map of Half and Half Doughnut Co.

Restaurant information
- Established: October 10, 2019
- Closed: 2025
- Location: 516 East Pike Street, Seattle, King, Washington, 98122, United States
- Coordinates: 47.6142°N 122.3248°W

Half and Half Doughnut Co. was a doughnut shop on Seattle's Capitol Hill, in the U.S. state of Washington. Top Pot Doughnuts co-founder Michael Klebeck and business partner Christine Cannon opened the shop on Pike Street in 2019. Half and Half has garnered a positive reception, especially for its pineapple fritter. It closed in 2025.

== Description ==
Half and Half was a 1950s-inspired doughnut shop on Pike Street, on Seattle's Capitol Hill. According to KING-TV, the business "combine[d] traditional doughnut-making with modern flavor combinations". Half and Half used organic ingredients from the Pacific Northwest. In addition to various doughnut varieties with "extravagant" flavors such as nocciolata (chocolate hazelnut) and peanut butter cup, the menu also included biscuits, breakfast sandwiches, caramelized pineapple cronuts, almond joy old-fashioneds, and stuffed "bombas" inspired by desserts such as bananas foster and s'mores. One sandwich had sun-dried tomato pesto, aioli, egg, and white cheddar cheese, with optional bacon. The restaurant also served sous vide eggs with toppings like bacon and cheese, as well as coffee and espresso drinks, chai, and hot chocolate.

== History ==
Half and Half was established by Michael Klebeck, who previously co-founded Top Pot Doughnuts, and business partner Christine Cannon. The shop opened on October 10, 2019, in the space previously occupied by Sun Liquor Distillery, which was also owned by Klebeck. It closed in 2025, and was replaced by The Counter Shoppe in 2026.

== Reception ==
In November 2019, shortly after Half and Half opened, The Seattle Times said the pineapple fritter was the highest selling offering to date. In 2020, during the COVID-19 pandemic, Eater Seattle included the business in an overview of "delightful" doughnuts available via take-out in the metropolitan area. The Infatuation and The Stranger have recommended the pineapple fritter, and the former included Half and Half in a 2023 overview of the city's best doughnuts. Allecia Vermillion included Half and Half in Seattle Metropolitan's 2024 overview of the city's best doughnuts.

== See also ==
- List of defunct restaurants of the United States
- List of doughnut shops
