= Dutchie (doughnut) =

Canadian doughnut

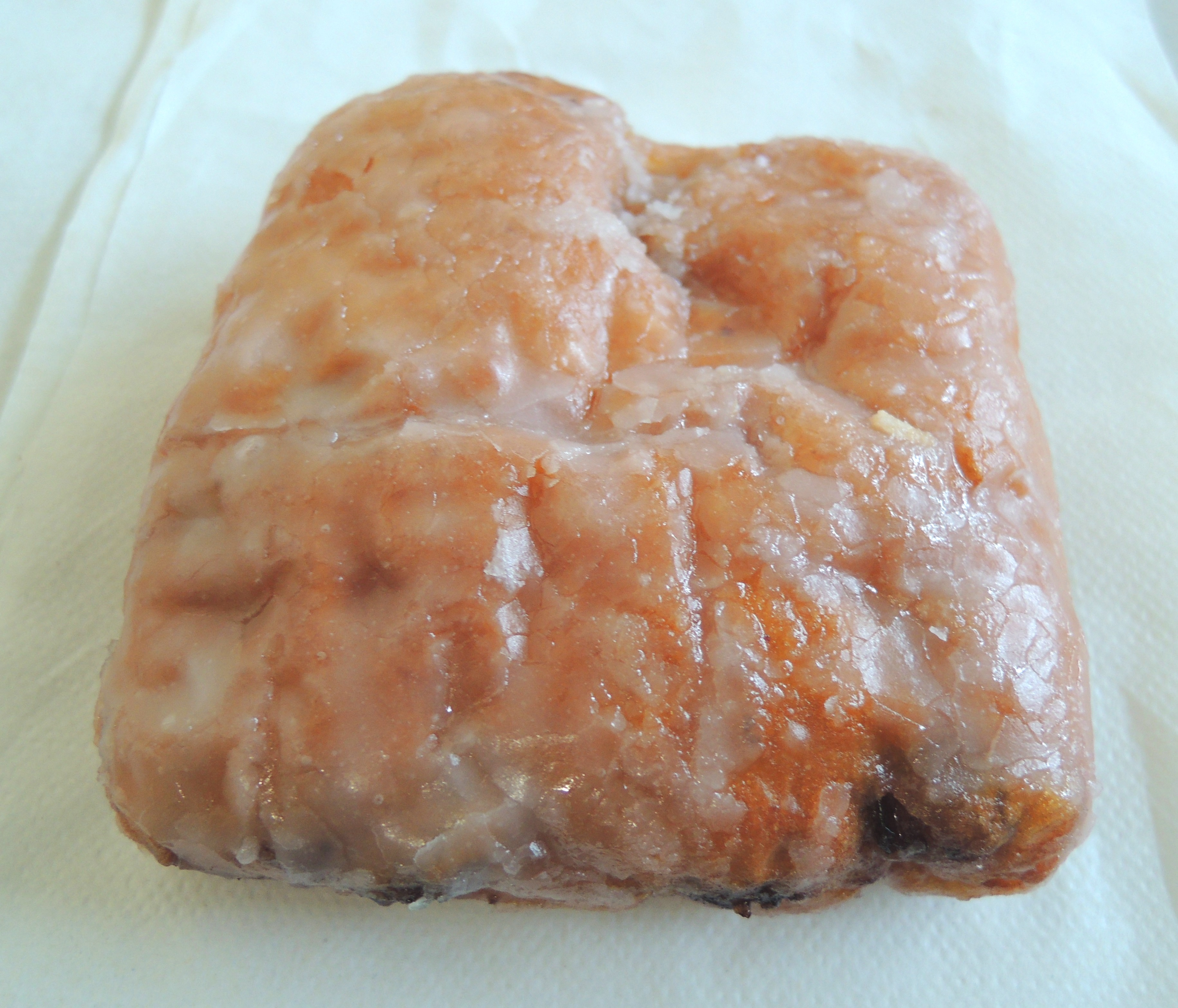
- A dutchie from Tim Hortons
- Type: Doughnut
- Place of origin: Canada
- Created by: Tim Hortons
- Main ingredients: Dough, raisins, sugar glaze

The dutchie is a Canadian doughnut popularized by the Tim Hortons chain. It is a square, yeast-lifted doughnut containing raisins that is coated with a sugary glaze. The dutchie was one of two original baked goods (along with the apple fritter) that had been available on Tim Hortons' doughnut menu since the chain's inception in 1964.

== In Canada ==
In an informal 1988 poll of Toronto Star readers, Tim Hortons was awarded three gold medals, two for its dutchies and one for the banana cream doughnut. The company's double chocolate and honey glazed fared less well with the judges.

In 1995, the Toronto Star had a story reflecting on Tim Hortons "selling out" to Wendy's with "the spectacle of another great Canadian icon, one more priceless chocolate coconut cream-filled dutchie glazed cruller Timbit of our precious heritage, gone to Yankee burgerfat, (rounding) out the menus of the two chains by blending Tim Hortons morning meals and snacks with the strength enjoyed by Wendy's in lunches and dinners; burp; and nobody around to pass the Maalox?"

A 2009 story in The New York Times reported an apparent scarcity of doughnut specialties such as the dutchie at the newly opened New York City Tim Hortons stores. The report contrasted the baked from scratch at stores approach of Krispy Kreme and some Dunkin' Donuts locations compared to the "flash frozen" and shipped Tim Hortons method. Noting that "American visitors tend to flock to the sweets", including the "raisin-studded Dutchie", the Times found redemption among Canadians that the brand is once again a Canada-based company while contrasting the way politicians in the U.S. "woo" soccer moms while in Canada they "go after Tim Hortons voters".

The dutchie is no longer on the chain's permanent menu. It was temporarily re-introduced in June 2017 as one of several "Canadian-themed" products celebrating Canada's sesquicentennial. It was similarly temporarily re-introduced in January 2024 as one of several "retro" products celebrating Tim Hortons' 60th anniversary.

== Timbit ==
Tim Hortons has sold a smaller donut hole Dutchie under the Timbit brand. In February 2014, Tim Hortons announced that Dutchie Timbit had been discontinued due to low popularity.

== See also ==
- List of doughnut varieties
- List of breakfast foods
