= Old-fashioned doughnut =

Type of deep fried food

Old-fashioned doughnuts
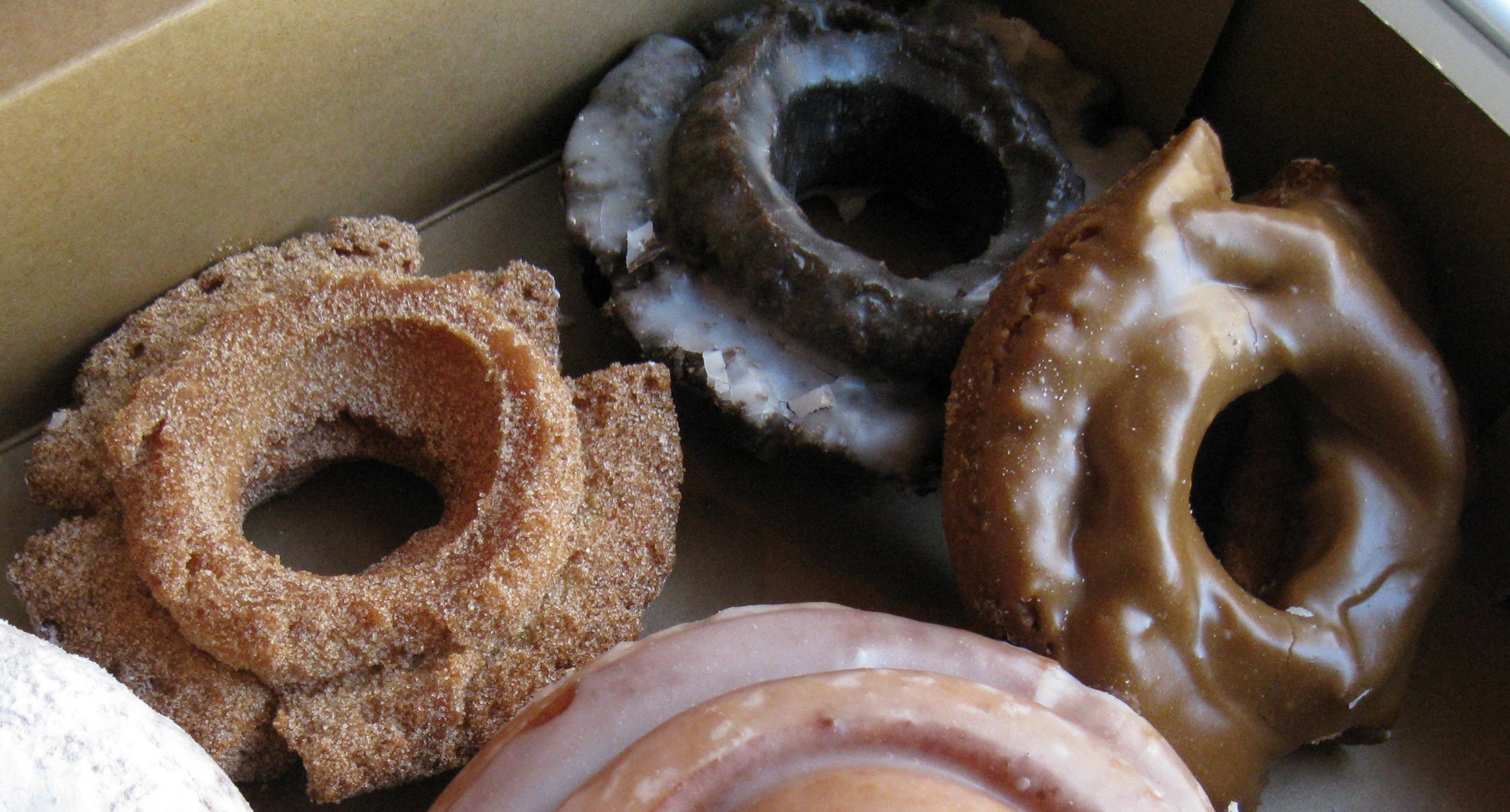
- Old-fashioned doughnuts – cinnamon sugar (left), chocolate glazed (centre top) and maple glazed (right). Shape shown is typical of commercially available buttermilk donuts.
- Type: Cake doughnut
- Main ingredients: Flour, sugar, eggs, butter, sour cream or buttermilk and chemical leavener

The old-fashioned doughnut is a term used for a variety of cake doughnut prepared in the shape of a ring with a cracked surface and tapered edges. While many early cookbooks included recipes for "old-fashioned donuts" that were made with yeast, the distinctive cake doughnuts sold in doughnut shops are made with chemical leavener and may have crisper texture compared to other styles of cake doughnuts. The cracked surface is usually glazed or coated with sugar.

Commercially prepared old-fashioned doughnuts may be prepared using a batter mix that is made with the addition of water. Such mixes are used by some doughnut shops. Specialty versions are made by using an enormous variety of ingredients, and some old-fashioned doughnuts are produced as doughnut holes.

== History ==
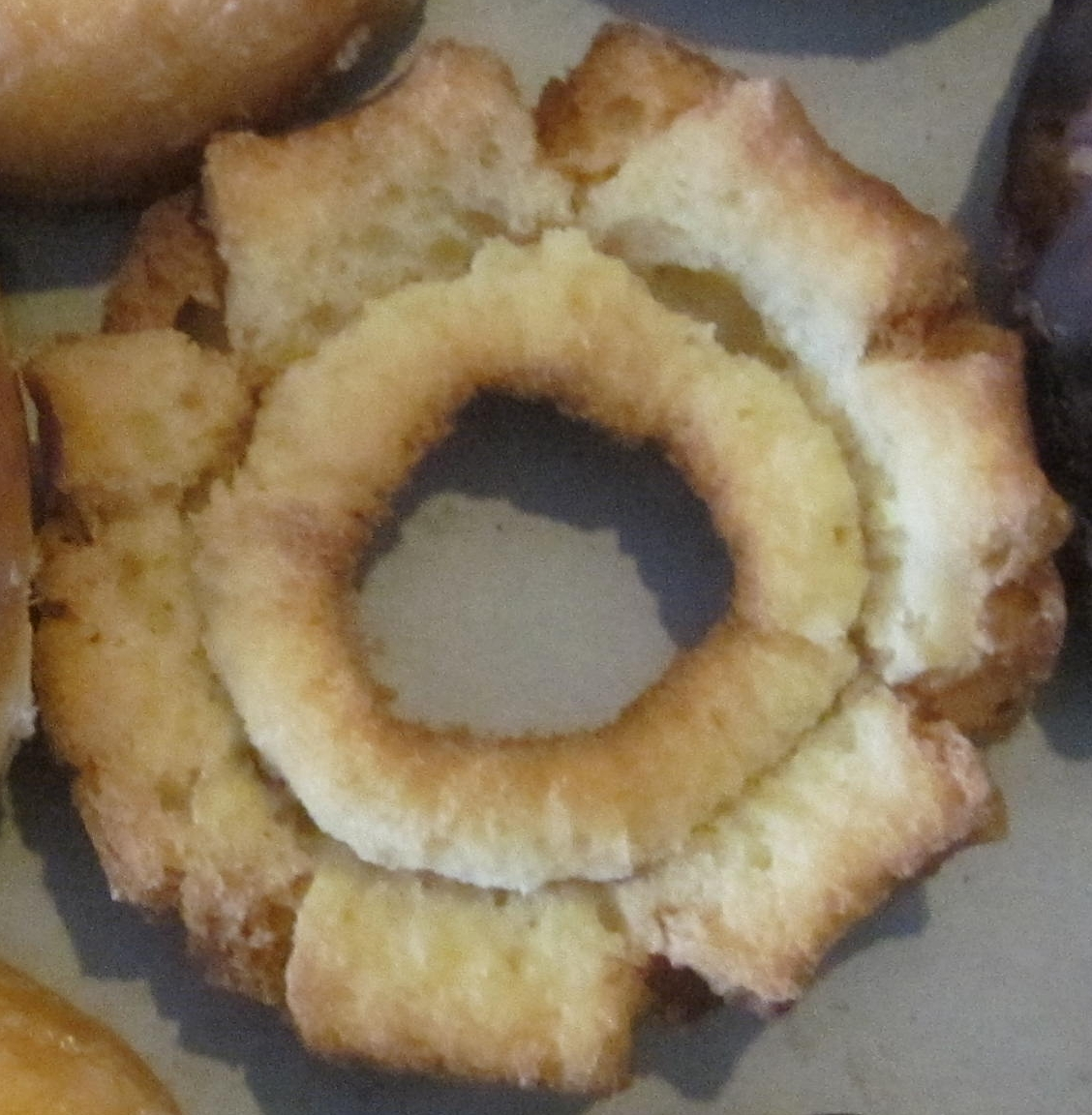
A plain old-fashioned doughnut

Nineteenth century recipes for "old-fashioned donuts" are made with yeast, but in modern doughnut shops an "old-fashioned doughnut" is usually a cake doughnut. Historically, the terms are used imprecisely, and some controversy has arisen over the meaning of the terms doughnut, cruller and fry cake. Old-fashioned cake doughnuts were sometimes called "fry cakes" in the past.

Doughnuts are made of pieces of raised dough, cut into circular pieces and set to rise. After rising they are dropped into a kettle of hot fat, where they puff up into balls and become brown on the surface. Crullers and fried cakes, on the other hand, are made of dough leavened with baking powder—in colonial times soda served instead. For fried cakes, frequently misnamed as doughnuts and crullers, the dough is rolled out and cut into circles, and then a smaller circle is cut out of the center of each cake. It is the fried cake that has the hole.

In the present day, the old-fashioned doughnut is most commonly a type of cake doughnut, and has been described as a "subset" of the cake doughnut. The cake doughnut itself originated in the United States circa 1829, when the increased availability of pearlash in the U.S., a type of Leavening agent that preceded baking powder, led to the increase of cake doughnut consumption. It is unclear when the old-fashioned doughnut itself was invented, but this very likely occurred after the cake doughnut was invented. Prior to circa 1829, doughnuts were typically the yeast-risen variety in the U.S. Circa the 1830s, the leaveners baking soda and baking powder began to be available to U.S. consumers, which is around the same time that cake doughnut recipes first appeared in U.S. cookbooks.

== Preparation ==
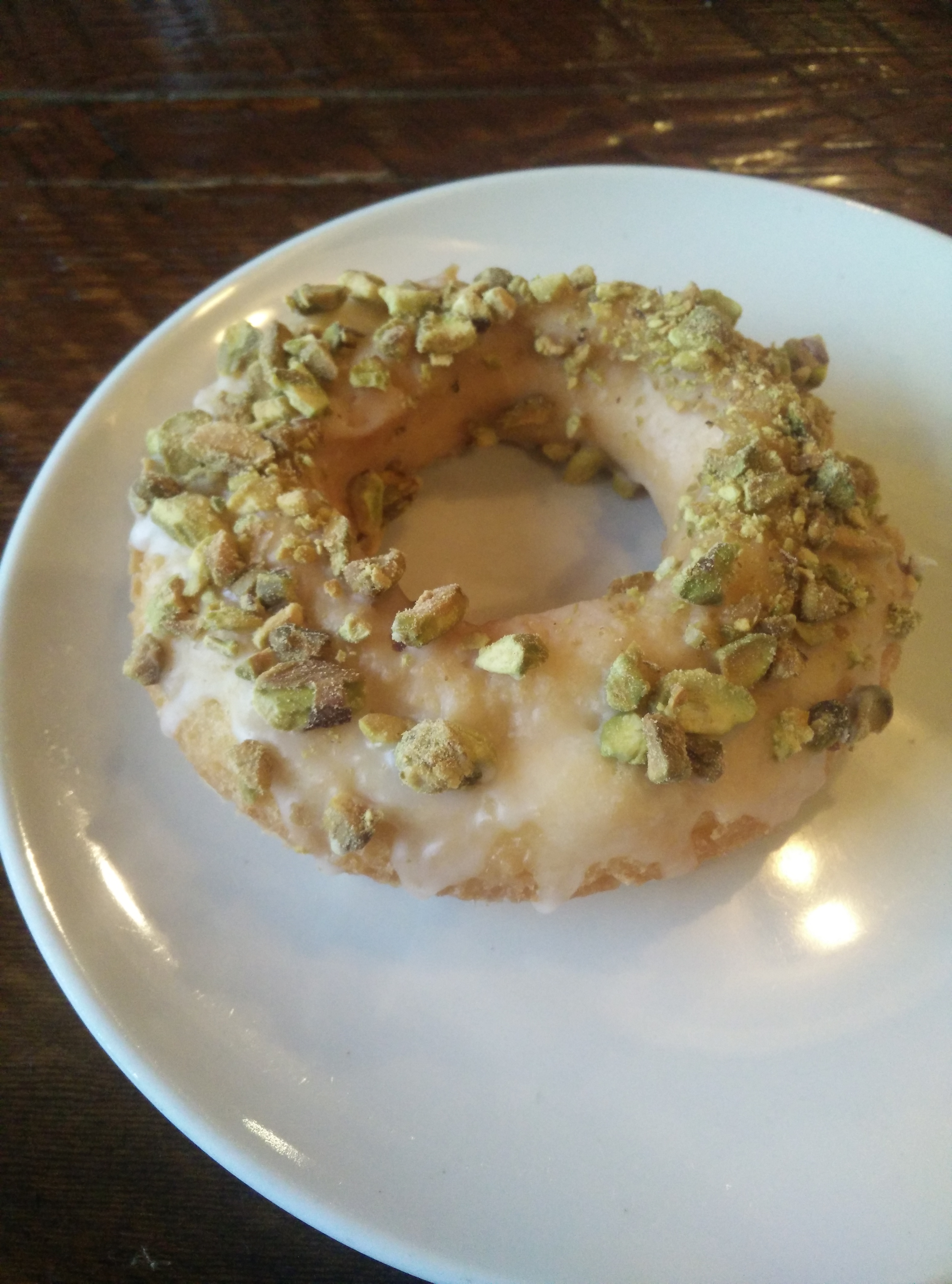
Orange & pistachio old-fashioned doughnut

Primary ingredients in an old-fashioned doughnut include flour, sugar, eggs, sour cream or buttermilk, and leavening agents such as baking powder or baking soda. Additional ingredients may include milk, butter, vanilla extract and salt. Some recipes use vegetable shortening. The use of buttermilk or sour cream may impart a rich flavor to the doughnut.

The old-fashioned doughnut may also have a similar texture to that of a buttermilk doughnut, may be crisp in texture, and typically has cracks and pores on its surface. It is typically deep-fried, and may use a lower oil temperature compared to other doughnut styles. Frying at a lower temperature imparts its crunchier texture and contributes to its rough, cracked surface. Being turned several times while cooking in the oil also affects its texture.

Old-fashioned doughnuts may be prepared with toppings such as sugar, chocolate or maple glazes, dusted with granulated sugar or cinnamon-sugar, or served plain without any topping. The shape of the doughnut can lead to the retention of a greater amount of glaze or other toppings compared to other doughnut styles.

== Commercial preparation ==
Commercially prepared old-fashioned doughnut batter mixes mass-produced in the United States, may be prepared by simply adding cold water to the mix. Prepared mixes are used by some, but not all, doughnut shops. Doughnut shops may prepare old-fashioned doughnuts by loading the batter into the hopper of a doughnut maker, which uses a hand crank to drop formed doughnuts into a deep fryer. Doughnut makers are also used for other doughnut varieties, such as cake doughnuts, yeast doughnuts, cream filled, and jelly filled doughnuts.

== Nutrition information ==
Glazed old-fashioned doughnut
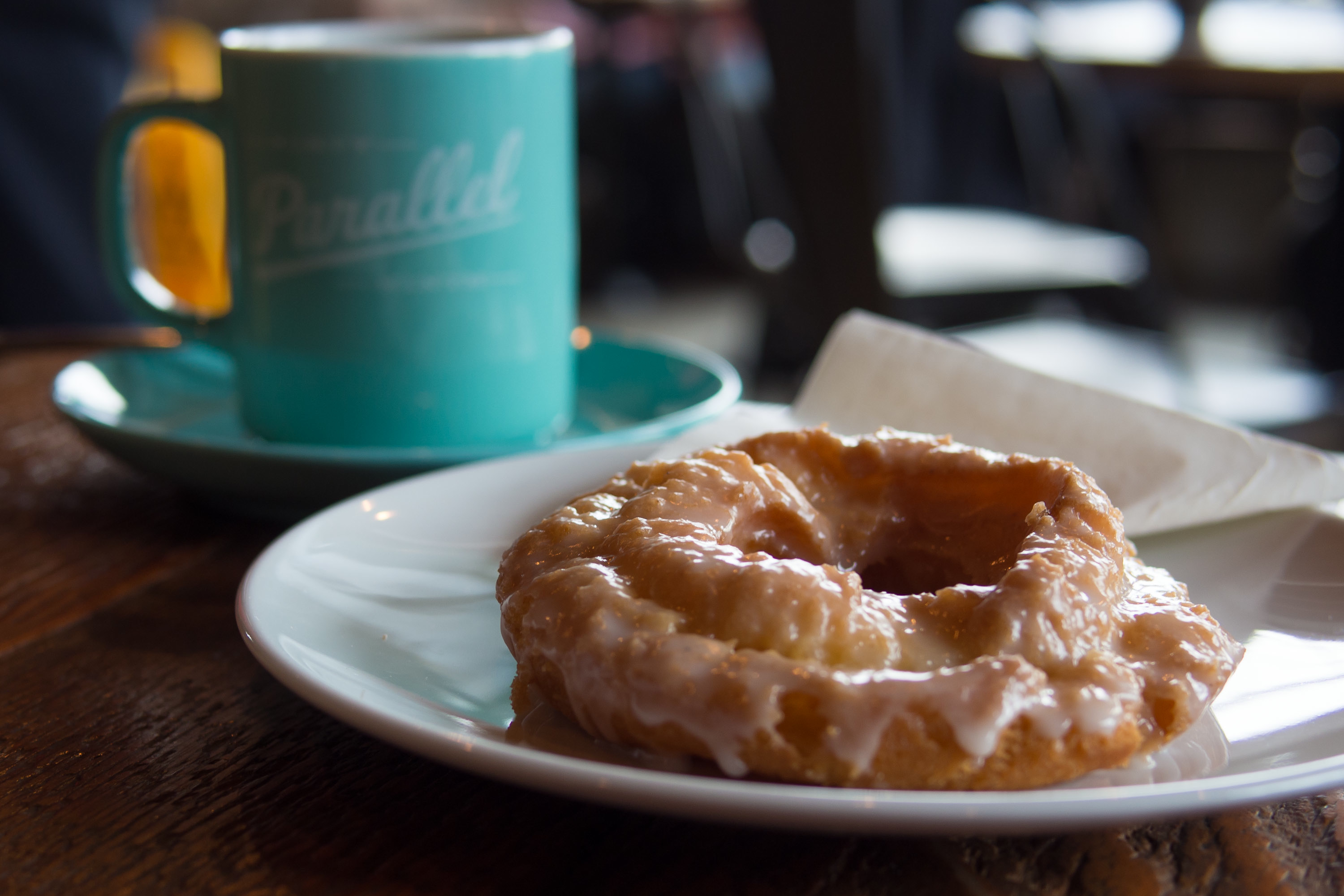
- A glazed old-fashioned doughnut

Nutritional value per single doughnut
- Energy: 420 kcal (1,800 kJ)
- Carbohydrates: 57
- Sugars: 34
- Dietary fiber: <1
- Fat: 21
- Saturated: 10
- Protein: 4
Vitamins and minerals
Minerals	Quantity %DV^{†}
Sodium	11% 260 mg
- ^{†}Percentages estimated using US recommendations for adults.

One average glazed old-fashioned doughnut contains approximately 420 calories, 21 grams of fat, 10 grams of saturated fat, 260 milligrams of sodium, 57 grams of carbohydrate, 34 grams of sugar, 4 grams of protein and less than one gram of dietary fiber.

== Variations ==
Several companies produce old-fashioned doughnuts that differ from standard preparations. Starbucks Corporation, based in Seattle, Washington, purveys an old-fashioned doughnut that is prepared using batter infused with chocolate. The U.S. company Trader Joe's sells a mass-produced product named "Old-Fashioned Doughnut O's", which are miniature-sized old-fashioned doughnuts. In September 2015, Do-Rite Donuts in Chicago, Illinois, created limited-edition custom doughnuts in collaboration with various celebrities, which included an old-fashioned doughnut with maple glaze garnished with candied Fresno chili peppers. The company Glazed and Infused in Chicago, Illinois, serves customers the traditional glazed old-fashioned as well as a lemon poppy seed old-fashioned doughnut that is covered with lemon-flavored glaze and topped with poppy seeds and lemon zest.

Top Pot Doughnuts in Seattle, Washington, prepares both vanilla- and chocolate-based old-fashioned doughnuts. Each flavor can be dipped in glaze, raspberry glaze, chocolate icing, maple icing, or sugared pumpkin (in season). The restaurant Nopa in San Francisco, California, has prepared a dessert using old-fashioned doughnut holes along with Asian pears, crème anglaise, pear butter and cardamaro liqueur. The doughnuts at Nopa are prepared using a sour cream base.

== See also ==
- List of doughnut varieties
- List of doughnut shops
- Sour cream doughnut
