= Sour cream doughnut =

Doughnut with sour cream batter

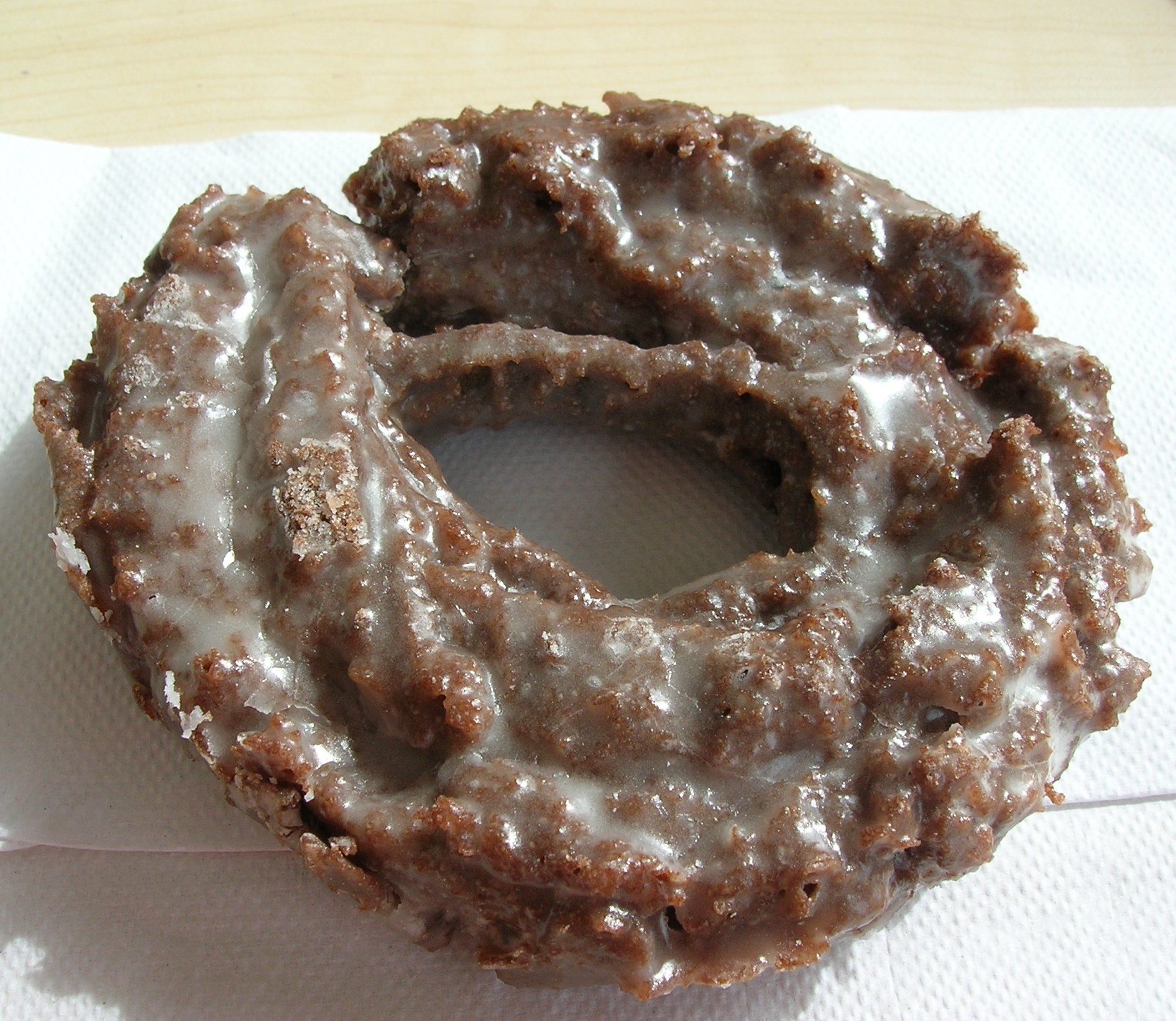
- A chocolate sour cream doughnut
- Type: Doughnut
- Place of origin: Canada, United States
- Main ingredients: Doughnut batter, sour cream

A sour cream doughnut is a type of doughnut that incorporates sour cream into its batter. This type of doughnut is often dipped in a vanilla flavored glaze after frying and usually has no filling. While the exact date or place of origin for the sour cream doughnut is not known, one recipe for this type of doughnut was published by the Ladies' Aid Society of Marion, Ohio in 1894.

== Variations ==
Variations on a traditional sour cream doughnut include using a maple glaze with a sugar-walnut streusel. Another variation is a chocolate sour cream doughnut with a chocolate orange glaze. As a substitute for the traditional vanilla glaze topping, powdered sugar or a ground cinnamon and sugar mixture can also be used.

== See also ==
- List of doughnut varieties
- Old fashioned doughnut
