= Timbits =

Type of doughnut sold by Tim Hortons

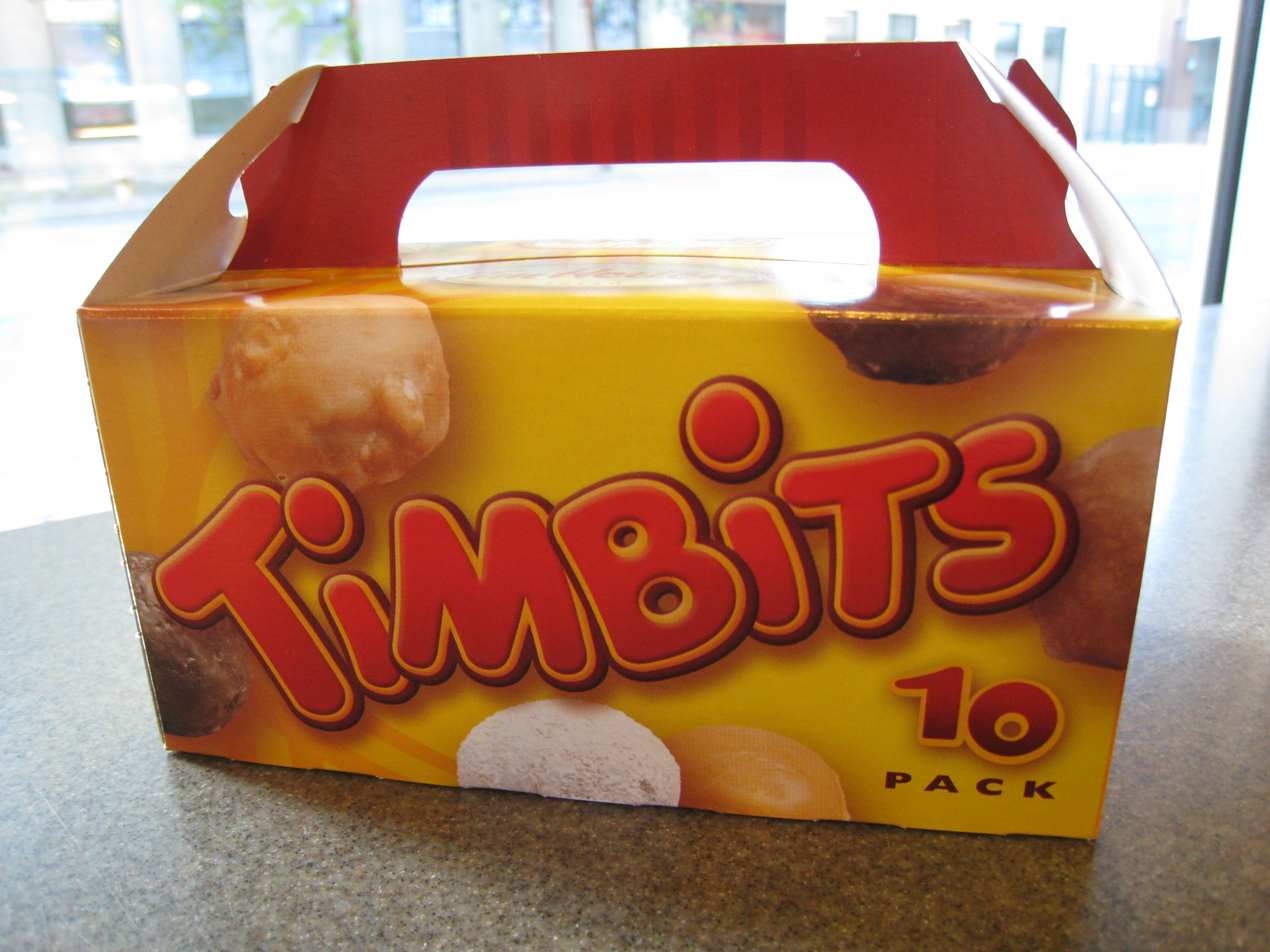
- A 10 pack of Timbits
- Type: Doughnut, donut hole
- Place of origin: Canada
- Created by: Tim Hortons
- Food energy (per serving): 45 to 90 kcal (190 to 380 kJ)

Timbits are bite-sized pastries sold at the Canadian-based franchise Tim Hortons. Timbits are almost an exact equivalent to the American "donut hole"; however, they are baked, rather than fried. They were introduced in April 1976.

== Name and variations ==
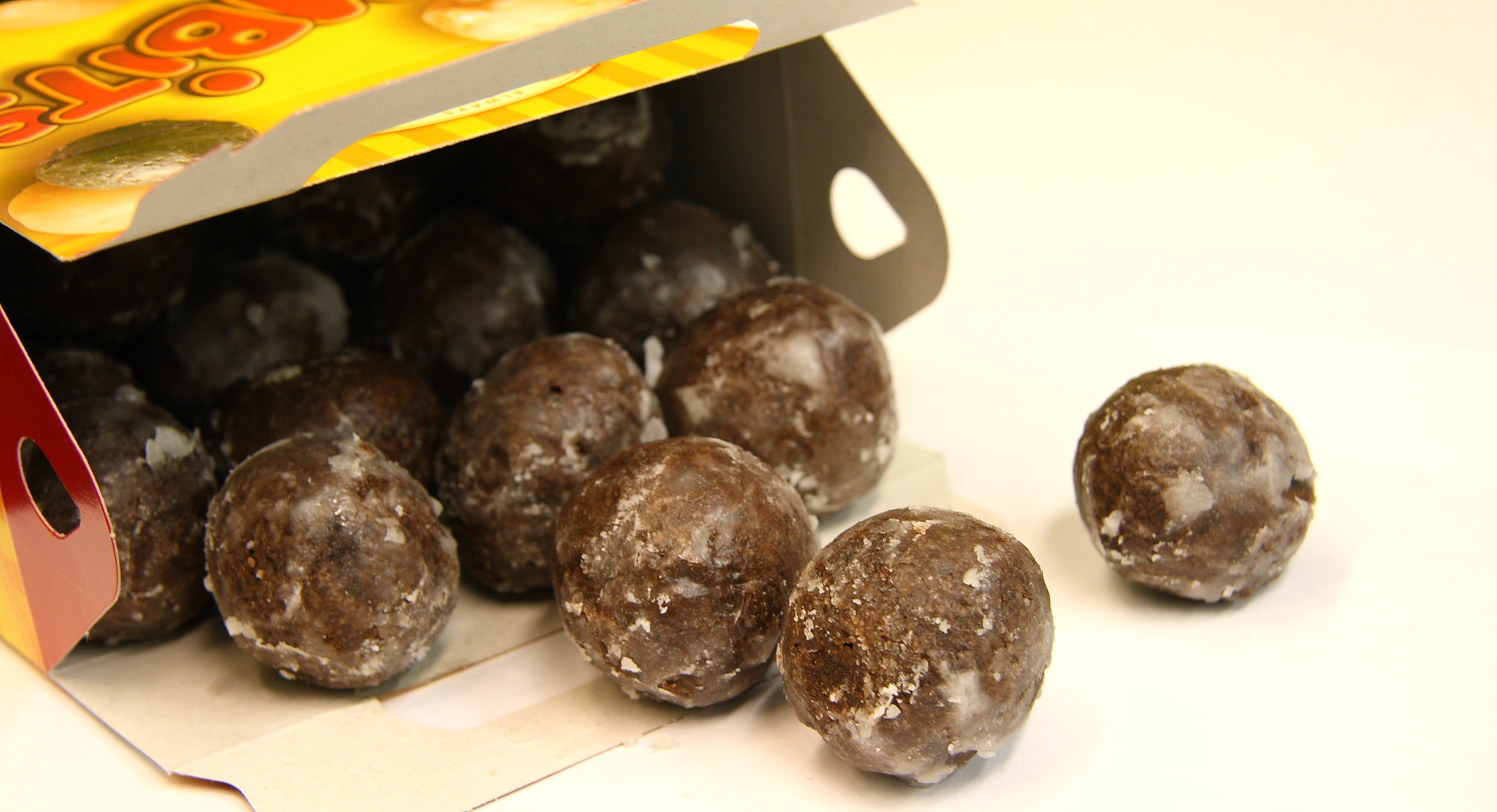
Chocolate timbits in box

The word Timbit is a play on the word "tidbit" (a delicate bit or morsel of food) and the name of restaurant founder Tim Horton. As of 2009, they are available in various flavours that differ from store to store. Flavours include chocolate-glazed, jelly-filled, dutchie, honey dip, sour-cream-glazed, old-fashioned plain, old-fashion-glazed, blueberry, strawberry, raspberry, lemon, apple cider, orange-tangerine, creamy caramel, cherry cake, birthday cake, honey cruller, pumpkin spice, toasted coconut, and apple fritter. For Tim Hortons's 50th anniversary, "birthday cake" doughnuts and Timbits were sold for a limited time and given out for free on May 17, 2014- the Timbits being available first in the United States.

Other doughnut chains in Canada and the United States sell virtually identical products, often called "doughnut holes". For instance, the American coffee and donut company Dunkin' Donuts, sells munchkins. The majority of Canadians generally use the Timbits trademark to designate the product, while French-speaking Canadians prefer to use the generic term "trous de beigne". In the francophone Tim Hortons locations, however, they are still referred to as Timbits.

== Timbiebs ==
In November 2021, Tim Hortons announced a collaboration with Canadian pop star Justin Bieber to release three limited time flavours along with collaborative merchandise. The November 29th release saw chocolate white fudge, sour cream chocolate chip, and birthday cake waffle Timbiebs become available in Canadian and American Tim Hortons. Participating Tim Hortons franchises also sold the Timbiebs branded tote bag, toque, and fanny pack. A French and English television ad also released at the time of the announcement in mid-November.

According to Tim Hortons Chief Marketing Office Hope Bagozzi, the collaboration talks began after Bieber took to Instagram discussing the coffee chain’s lid change in 2019. Bieber said "Doing a Tim Hortons collab has always been a dream of mine" in a statement following the collaboration announcement, and that Timbiebs were his "go-to" Tim Hortons item.

The collaboration garnered media and fan attention, with many expressing their love for the new flavours. Then-CEO of Restaurant Brands International, Tim Hortons' parent company, José Cil called the collaboration "one of the more successful traffic-driving initiatives in recent memory" which generated "unprecedented social engagement" in RBI's Q4 2022 results.

== See also ==
- List of doughnut varieties
- List of fried dough varieties
- List of breakfast foods
