= Donut hole =

Type of donut

Donut holes
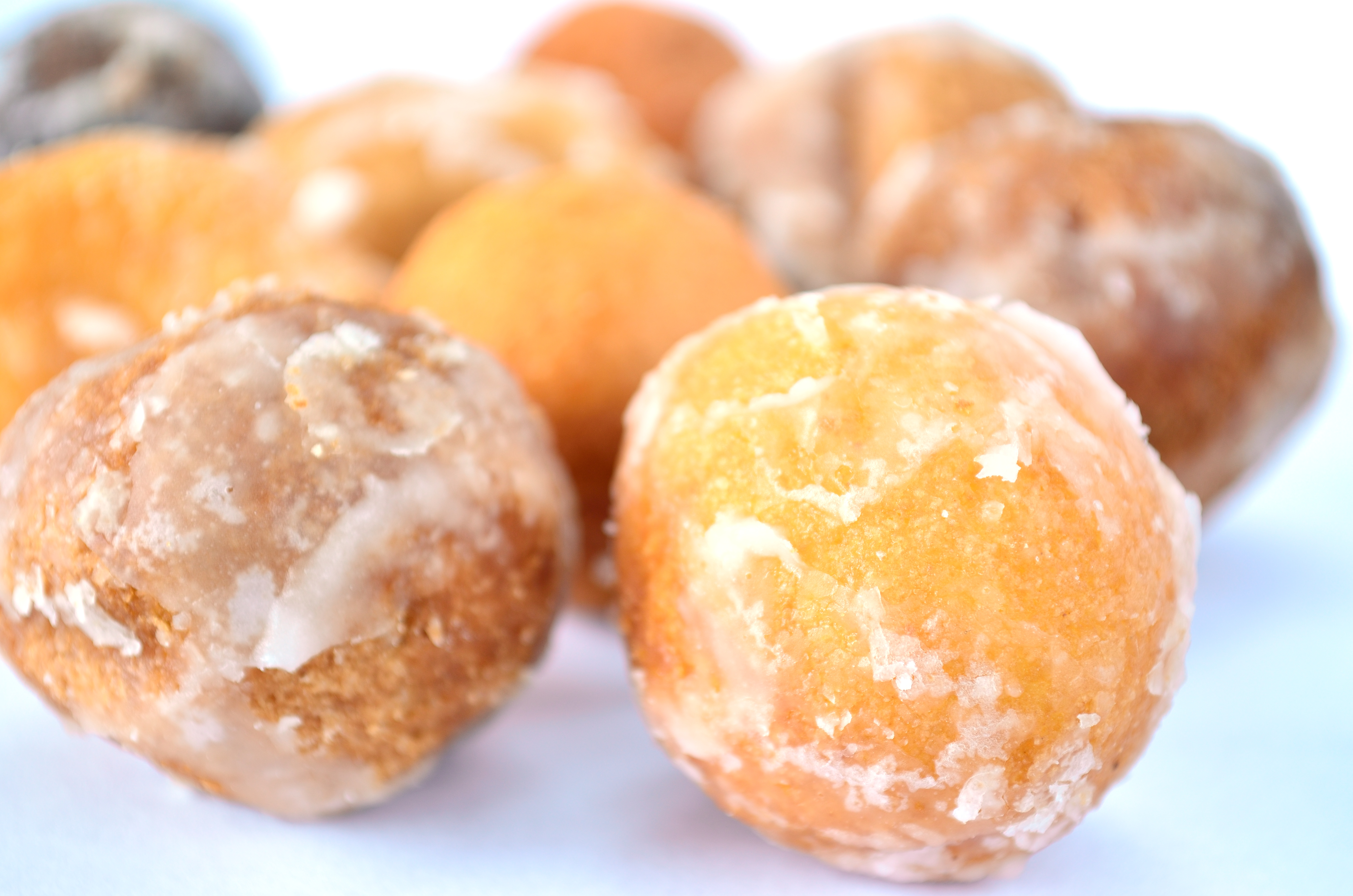
- A variety of powdered and glazed donut holes
- Type: Fried dough
- Course: Dessert
- Associated cuisine: American cuisine, Canadian cuisine
- Serving temperature: Room temperature

A donut hole (also doughnut hole) is a type of donut formed out of a small round piece of dough. Donut holes can be plain, or coated in a topping such as glaze, and are a popular dessert in Canada and the United States. The name comes from the idea that the hole in a ring donut could be filled in by an appropriately sized ball.

== History ==
=== Origins ===
There are several purported origins for both donut holes and the classic "ring" shaped donut. The concept of forming donuts with a hole in the center is commonly attributed to Captain Hanson Gregory, who claimed to have invented the first ring donut after cutting the center of his mother's donuts out in 1847.

Many early recipes called for the donut to be formed in the shape of a jumble, a circular cookie with a hole in the center. It has also been suggested that this was invented because donuts cook more quickly when they have a hole in the center.

=== Popularity ===
In 1973, Dunkin' added "Munchkins" to their menu, selling them in the various flavors of their donuts as a way to use up the dough cuttings taken from the center of their ring donut. The name reportedly stems from the miniature "Munchkin" characters from the 1939 film The Wizard of Oz. The chain had previously unsuccessfully attempted to market them as "donut holes" before changing their strategy to appeal to younger consumers. However, as of 2021, the company produces donut holes separately from full size donuts. This is common for most donut producers in the 21st century. In 1976, Canadian coffee chain Tim Hortons introduced donut holes called "Timbits" to their menu.

== Description ==
Like regular donuts, donut holes can come in many varieties. The dough itself can fall under the categories of either cake or yeast style. The main difference between the two is that cake style donut holes use a leavening agent like baking soda or baking powder to bring rise to the bread, while a yeast style donut uses yeast.

== See also ==
- List of doughnut varieties
- List of fried dough varieties
