= Top Pot Doughnuts =

American doughnut cafe chain

Coordinates: 47°37′29″N 122°19′32″W

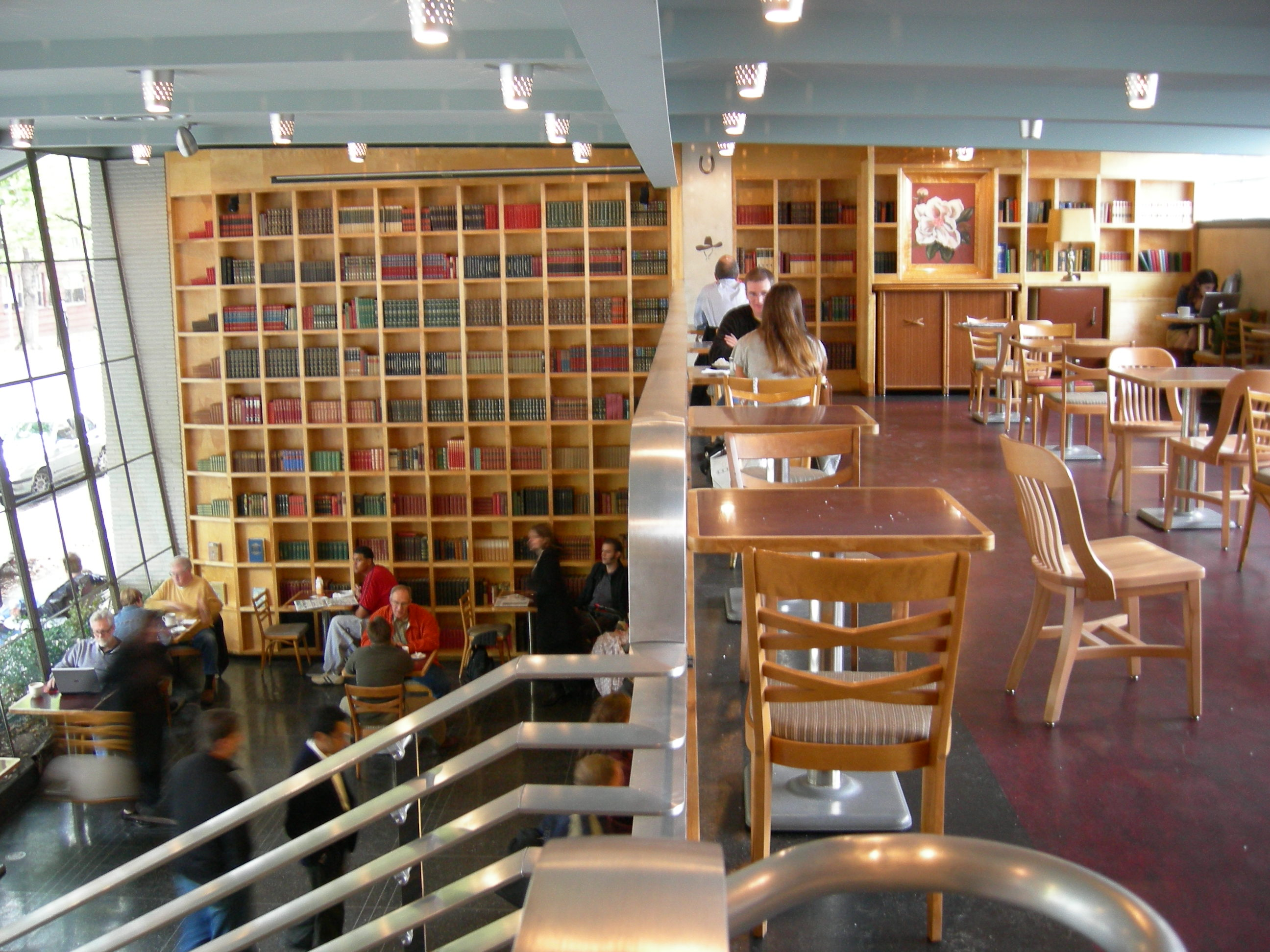
- Interior of Top Pot's store on 5th Avenue in Belltown/Denny Regrade, Seattle
- Type: Private
- Industry: Coffeehouses
- Founded: February 2002; 24 years ago
- Founder: Mark and Michael Klebeck
- Headquarters: Seattle, Washington, United States
- Number of locations: 17
- Website: toppotdoughnuts.com

Top Pot Doughnuts is a chain of coffee and doughnut cafes started in the Capitol Hill neighborhood of Seattle, Washington. Top Pot began in February 2002 and was started by brothers Mark and Michael Klebeck.

== Locations ==
As of 16 November 2023, Top Pot has 17 cafe locations throughout the Puget Sound region, though they are only made at their downtown Seattle and Bellevue locations and shipped to other locations in the region by truck. Their recipes are used for the doughnuts sold in more than 7,000 Starbucks stores in the U.S. and Canada and also for doughnuts sold by Seattle-area grocer QFC. Top Pot Doughnuts are the official doughnut at Lumen Field, home of the Seattle Seahawks and Seattle Sounders FC. In 2011, Top Pot became the official doughnut and coffee of the National Lacrosse League team Washington Stealth. Starting in 2011, Top Pot Doughnuts expanded their offerings to grocery stores in Washington, Oregon, and California, including regional chain QFC.

== Founding ==
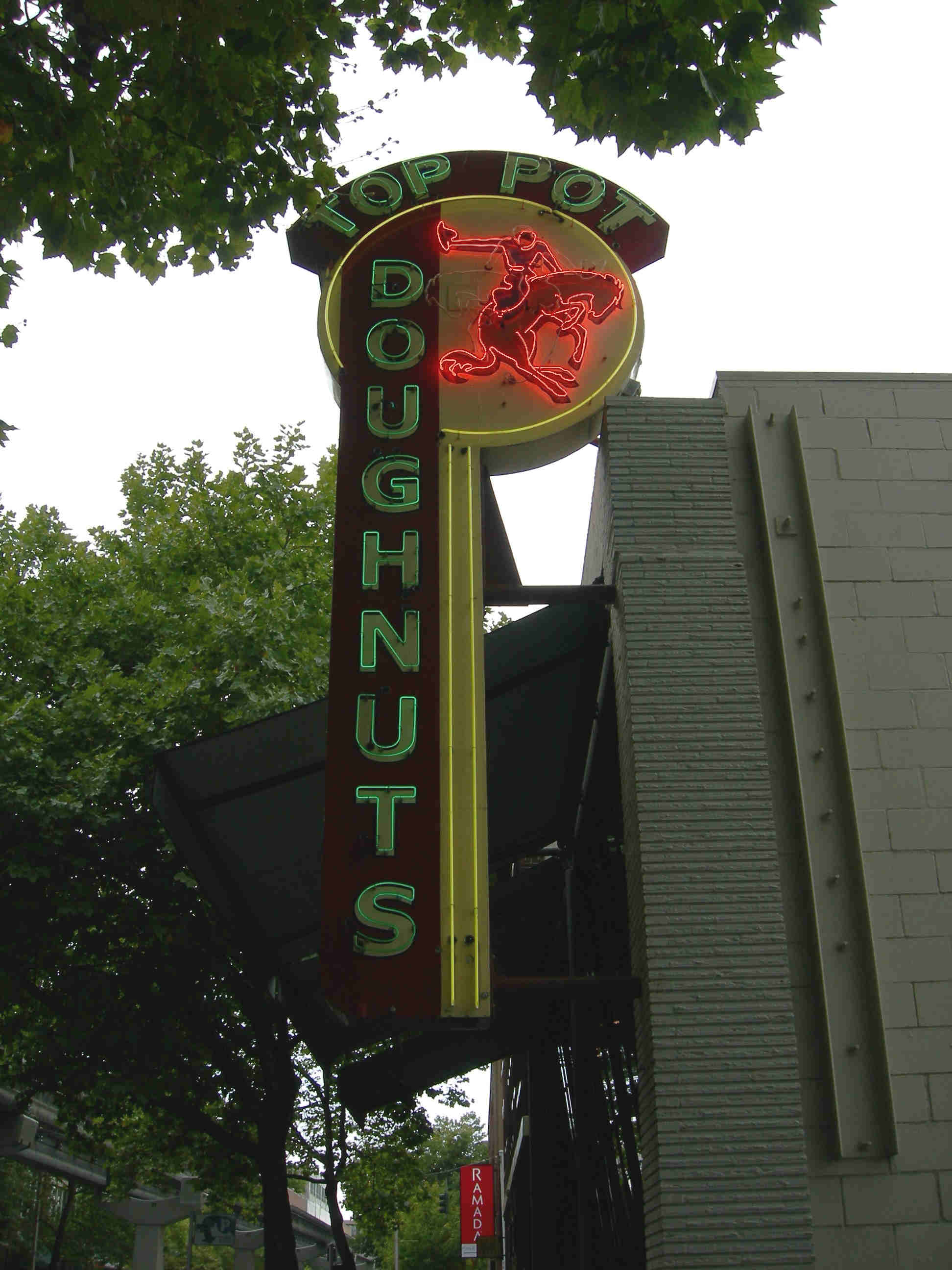
Top Pot's neon sign on 5th Avenue

The name "Top Pot" came from a vintage neon sign that was above a boarded-up Chinese restaurant called "Topspot". The co-founders bought the sign and while transporting it, the "S" fell off. Co-owner Mark suggested that they replace it with a coffee pot. Top Pot Doughnuts roast their own coffee at the 5th Ave location in Seattle.

== Patrons ==
When U.S. president Barack Obama visited Seattle in October 2010, he and Senator Patty Murray stopped for doughnuts at the Top Pot on 5th Avenue in the Belltown/Denny Regrade neighborhood.

In January 2011, Seattle mayor Mike McGinn bet (among various items) a dozen Top Pot maple bars with New Orleans mayor Mitch Landrieu over the NFL NFC Wild Card game.

== In media ==
=== Television ===
- Donut Paradise, Travel Channel

=== Books ===
- Klebeck, Mark; Klebeck, Michael; Thomson, Michael (2011). Top Pot Hand-Forged Doughnuts: Secrets and recipes for the home baker. San Francisco: Chronicle Books. ISBN 978-1-4521-0212-2.

== See also ==
- List of coffeehouse chains
- List of doughnut shops
