= Staffordshire Militia =

English auxiliary military force

The Staffordshire Militia was an auxiliary (Note: It is incorrect to describe the British Militia as 'irregular': throughout their history they were equipped and trained exactly like the line regiments of the regular army, and once embodied in time of war they were fulltime professional soldiers for the duration of their enlistment.) military force in Staffordshire in the West Midlands of England. From their formal organisation as Trained Bands in 1572 and their reorganisation in 1662 and 1777, the Militia regiments of Staffordshire served during times of international tension and all of Britain's major wars. They provided internal security and home defence but in the Crimean War were stationed in the Mediterranean relieving regular troops from routine garrison duties. They also acted as a source of trained officers and men for the Regular Army. By the later 19th Century there were four battalions, assigned to the South and North Staffordshire Regiments. All the battalions went on active service during the Second Boer War and all served as Special Reserve training units in World War I, with two battalions seeing considerable action on the Western Front. After 1921 the militia had only a shadowy existence until its final abolition in 1953.

== Early history ==
The English militia was descended from the Anglo-Saxon Fyrd, the military force raised from the freemen of the shires under command of their Sheriff. It continued under the Norman kings, notably at the Battle of the Standard (1138). The force was reorganised under the Assizes of Arms of 1181 and 1252, and again by King Edward I's Statute of Winchester of 1285.

Under this statute 'Commissioners of Array' would levy the required number of men from each shire. The usual shire contingent was 1000 infantry commanded by a millenar, divided into companies of 100 commanded by centenars or ductores, and subdivided into platoons of 20 led by vintenars. Edward I regularly summoned the men of the nearest shires, including Staffordshire, to fight in his Welsh Wars and for his Scottish campaign of 1300, when 216 Staffordshire men in two companies were present at the Siege of Caerlaverock. This procedure was continued for border campaigns under later kings, with the shire levies of Staffordshire and other northern counties being called out in 1327 during the campaign that ended in the Battle of Stanhope Park. By now the infantry were mainly equipped with the English longbow. Edward III called out the Staffordshire levies in 1333, when they served at the Siege of Berwick and the Battle of Halidon Hill. In 1335, 247 Staffordshire archers (57 of them Mounted infantry) served under two ductores and 10 vintenars. King Henry VIII strengthened the military capability of the country and in 1539 he called out a 'Great Muster' across the country, when armed men in the various hundreds of Staffordshire ranged from 300 to 1100.

== Staffordshire Trained Bands ==
The legal basis of the militia was updated by two Acts of 1557 (4 & 5 Ph. & M. cc. 2 and 3) covering musters and the maintenance of horses and armour. The county militia was now under the Lord Lieutenant, assisted by the Deputy Lieutenants and Justices of the Peace (JPs). The entry into force of these Acts in 1558 is seen as the starting date for the organised county militia in England.

Although the militia obligation was universal, it was clearly impractical to train and equip every able-bodied man, so after 1572 the practice was to select a proportion of men for the Trained Bands, who were mustered for regular training. The government aimed for 10 days' training a year, with a two-day 'general muster' at Michaelmas, and two 'special musters' lasting four days for detailed training at Easter and Whitsun. Staffordshire offered to train 300 out of 1500 able men. The government progressively stepped up the organisation and training: in 1580 the Earls of Warwick and Leicester and Sir Christopher Hatton were assigned a group of shires (including Staffordshire) to oversee and reinforce the work of the county commissioners for horses. When war broke out with Spain training and equipping the militia became a priority. From 1583 counties were organised into groups for training purposes, with emphasis on the invasion-threatened 'maritime' counties. Staffordshire was in the second group of 'inland' counties organised from May 1585 onwards. When the counties levied troops for overseas expeditions they usually conscripted the unemployed and criminals rather than the Trained Bandsmen. The Armada Crisis in 1588 led to the mobilisation of the trained bands. Staffordshire was assessed at 400 trained men, but actually furnished 100 trained and 200 untrained (or pioneers) with 28 lancers, 50 light horsemen and 26 armed with 'petronelles' (the Petronel was an early cavalry firearm).

With the passing of the threat of invasion, the trained bands declined in the early 17th Century. Later, King Charles I attempted to reform them into a national force or 'Perfect Militia' answering to the king rather than local control. In 1638 the King's Sergeant major general of infantry, Sir Jacob Astley, and his officers reviewed the TBs in several counties, when the Staffordshire contingent comprised 400 foot (with 248 muskets and 152 'corslets' or pikemen with armour), together with 73 cuirassiers and 30 light horse. The TBs were called out in 1639 and 1640 for the Bishops' Wars, though many of the men who actually went were untrained hired substitutes. Staffordshire was ordered to send 300 men for the 1640 expedition. When the Staffordshire contingent returned to be discharged after the 1639 campaign, some of the men took the opportunity to destroy the hated Enclosure fences of the Royal forests, and the riots were repeated when they were mustered for the 1640 campaign.

=== Civil War ===
Control of the trained bands was one of the major points of dispute between Charles I and Parliament that led to the English Civil War. However, with a few exceptions neither side made much use of the trained bands during the war beyond securing the county armouries for their own full-time troops. Nevertheless, the Stafford TBs (Horse and Foot) under Colonel William Comberford were part of the Royalist garrison of Stafford when the town was besieged in February 1643. The threat to Stafford was raised after the Battle of Hopton Heath in March.

During the Royalist uprising of 1648 (the Second English Civil War) the Staffordshire Militia (two troops of Horse and a regiment of Foot) provided the garrison of Leek. Once Parliament had established full control it passed a new Militia Act on 2 December 1648 that replaced lords lieutenant with its own county commissioners (at the same time the term 'Trained Band' began to disappear in most counties). The first name on the list of commissioners for Staffordshire and the City of Lichfield was Sir William Brereton, who had commanded the Parliamentarian forces in the area during the First Civil War, but he declined to sit as one of the King's judges a few weeks later and retired from public life. In 1650 the Staffordshire Militia were commanded by Col Henry Danvers (Foot) and Col John Ashenhurst (Horse, with Danvers as major).

Under the Commonwealth and Protectorate the militia received pay when called out, and operated alongside the New Model Army to control the country. During the Scottish invasion in the Third English Civil War in 1651, the Cheshire and Staffordshire Militia (Horse and Foot) joined Major-Generals Thomas Harrison and John Lambert's cavalry in trying to halt the invaders. At the skirmish known as the Battle of Warrington Bridge (16 August) they tried to hold the bridge, but the country was unsuitable for cavalry action and the foot were outnumbered and forced to fall back. On 24 August Cromwell joined Harrison and Lambert with the main army and the Staffordshire Militia were engaged at the subsequent Battle of Worcester that destroyed the Scottish Royalist army.

The Staffordshire Militia were called out following the death of Cromwell in 1659 to help deal with Booth's Uprising in neighbouring Cheshire. They were not present at Sir George Booth's defeat at the Battle of Winnington Bridge. At the time the regiment comprised 490 foot in six companies under the command of Col Crompton, and a troop of 67 horsemen.

At the Restoration of the Monarchy in 1660, Col John Bowyer of Knypersley Hall commanding the Staffordshire Militia arrested Maj-Gen Harrison as one of the Regicides of Charles I. Harrison was living in retirement in Staffordshire and made no attempt to escape. Bowyer was created a Baronet shortly afterwards.

== Staffordshire Militia ==
After the Restoration, The King's Sole Right over the Militia Act 1661 and the Militia Act 1662 re-established the English Militia under the control of the king's lords-lieutenant, the men to be selected by ballot. This was popularly seen as the 'Constitutional Force' to counterbalance a 'Standing Army' tainted by association with the New Model Army that had supported Cromwell's military dictatorship.

During the Second Anglo-Dutch War of 1666 the Militia were called out, with the cavalry of the inland counties, including the Staffordshire Militia Horse, moving up towards the East Coast. They were stood down on 6 August after the naval victory of the St. James's Day Battle when the threat of invasion receded. Training for the militia was usually perfunctory, so when the Duke of Monmouth became Lord Lieutenant of Staffordshire in 1677, he ordered that there should not only be an annual muster of the whole county force in May, but that each captain of a company or troop should hold local musters as often as he conveniently could.

The Staffordshire Militia consisted of five companies of foot (500 men) and two troops of horse (120 men) in 1697, but the militia was allowed to decline thereafter, especially after the Peace of Utrecht in 1713. There was a half-hearted attempt to raise a force in Staffordshire during the Jacobite Rising of 1715, but generally the militia disappeared thereafter. Under threat of French invasion during the Seven Years' War a series of Militia Acts from 1757 re-established county militia regiments, the men being conscripted by means of parish ballots (paid substitutes were permitted) to serve for three years. There was a property qualification for officers, who were commissioned by the lord lieutenant. The Midland counties were generally apathetic: Staffordshire was given a quota of 560 men to raise, but the county leaders failed to do so, and paid a fine instead.

=== American War of Independence ===
Staffordshire remained a defaulter county liable for militia fines throughout the 1760s. It was not until the War of American Independence, when Britain was threatened with invasion by the Americans' allies, France and Spain, that the Staffordshire Militia was reformed. It was embodied for full-time duty on 31 March 1778. The regiment was disembodied in 1783 after the end of the war.

From 1784 to 1792 the militia were supposed to assemble for 28 days' annual training, even though to save money only two-thirds of the men were actually called out each year. However, the Staffordshire Militia only trained in two of those years.

=== French Revolutionary War ===
The French Revolutionary Wars saw a new phase for the English militia: they were embodied for a whole generation, and became regiments of full-time professional soldiers (though restricted to service in the British Isles), which the regular army increasingly saw as a prime source of recruits. They served in coast defences, manning garrisons, guarding prisoners of war, and for internal security, while their traditional local defence duties were taken over by the Volunteers and mounted Yeomanry. The Staffordshire Militia was embodied in 1793 and spent 1794–5 quartered in Weymouth, Dorset, where it came to the notice of King George III who holidayed there. It served at Weymouth again in 1797, after which the king requested that it should carry out Royal duties at Windsor Castle. Until the Treaty of Amiens in 1802 the regiment spent most its time on duty at Windsor and Weymouth.

=== Supplementary Militia ===
In a fresh attempt to have as many men as possible under arms for home defence in order to release regulars, the Government created the Supplementary Militia, a compulsory levy of men to be trained in their spare time, and to be incorporated in the Militia in emergency. Staffordshire's quota was fixed at 2095 men, and two new regiments were formed from them by 1798, so that the original regiment was numbered 1st. The 2nd Regiment, of 10 companies, including grenadier and light companies, was commanded by Lord Granville Leveson-Gower, previously a captain in the 1st Regiment, who was commissioned on 5 April 1797. The 3rd Regiment, of 6 companies, was commanded by Francis Perceval Eliot, formerly major of the Staffordshire Yeomanry Cavalry, who was commissioned Lt-Col Commandant on 25 April 1798. However, the 2nd and 3rd were disbanded the following year when the militia quotas were reduced, and their remaining men were incorporated into the 1st. The Staffordshire Militia was disembodied on 26 April 1802 after the Treaty of Amiens.

=== King's Own Staffordshire Militia ===
The Peace of Amiens was short-lived, and the Staffordshire Militia was embodied again on 30 March 1803. A new 2nd Regiment was raised on 28 June, when Col Francis Eliot was appointed to command it. The 1st Regiment was ready for duty by 17 May and was immediately ordered to Windsor, where the King rode at its head when it marched into Windsor Barracks. It accompanied him to Weymouth in the summer of 1804, returning with him to Windsor in the autumn. In 1805 George III commanded that the regiment should become the King's Own Staffordshire Militia, and it was augmented by 200 men from the 2nd Regiment, which was disbanded. The regiment was on service at Windsor, St James's Palace and Kew Palace almost continuously until it was disembodied in 1814 at the end of the Napoleonic War. When Napoleon escaped from Elba in 1815, the regiment was re-embodied while the regular army was serving in the Waterloo campaign. It was finally disembodied in April 1816.

=== Local Militia ===
While the Militia were the mainstay of national defence during the Revolutionary and Napoleonic Wars, they were supplemented from 1808 by the Local Militia, which were part-time and only to be used within their own districts. These were raised to counter the declining numbers of Volunteers. Staffordshire had five regiments of local militia:

- Eastern Regiment at Cheadle, Lt-Col Commandant Thomas Wilson, commissioned 24 September 1808
- Western Regiment at Wolverhampton, Lt-Col Commandant Sir John Wrottesley, 9th Baronet, commissioned 1 March 1809, retired major, 32nd Foot
- Northern Regiment at Newcastle-under-Lyme, Lt-Col Commandant Walter Sneyd, commissioned 1 March 1809, previously Lt-Col, Staffordshire Militia
- Southern Regiment at Tamworth (moved to Lichfield 1810), Lt-Col Commandant Sir John Boughey, 2nd Baronet, commissioned 1 March 1809, previously Capt-Commandant, Betley and Audley Volunteers
- Central Regiment at Lichfield, Lt-Col Commandant George Chetwynd, commissioned 9 April 1810

== 1852 Reforms ==
After Waterloo there was another long peace. Although officers continued to be commissioned into the militia and ballots were still held until they were suspended by the Militia Act 1829, the regiments were rarely assembled for training and the permanent staffs of sergeants and drummers (who were occasionally used to maintain public order) were progressively reduced. The Militia of the United Kingdom was revived by the Militia Act 1852, enacted during a renewed period of international tension. As before, units were raised and administered on a county basis, and filled by voluntary enlistment (although conscription by means of the Militia Ballot might be used if the counties failed to meet their quotas). Training was for 56 days on enlistment, then for 21–28 days per year, during which the men received full army pay. Under the Act, Militia units could be embodied by Royal Proclamation for full-time home defence service in three circumstances:

1. 'Whenever a state of war exists between Her Majesty and any foreign power'.
2. 'In all cases of invasion or upon imminent danger thereof'.
3. 'In all cases of rebellion or insurrection'.

Under this Act, two new regiments of King's Own Staffordshire Militia were raised in 1853. Thereafter the county's militia was organised as follows:

- King's Own (1st Staffordshire) Militia at Lichfield
- King's Own (2nd Staffordshire) Light Infantry Militia raised 5 January 1853, based at Stafford
- King's Own (3rd Staffordshire) Rifle Militia, raised 5 April 1853, based at Newcastle-under-Lyme

=== Crimea and Indian Mutiny ===
War having broken out with Russia in 1854 and an expeditionary force sent to the Crimea, the militia were called out for home defence and service in overseas garrisons:

- King's Own (1st Staffordshire) Militia: embodied from May 1854 to October 1856; volunteered for overseas service and stationed in the Ionian Islands (then a British protectorate) from April 1855 to August 1856, losing a number of men and families dead from sickness; awarded the Battle honour Mediterranean.
- King's Own (2nd Staffordshire) Light Infantry Militia: embodied from 19 December 1854 to 16 June 1856
- King's Own (3rd Staffordshire) Rifle Militia: embodied from 19 December 1854 to 26 May 1856

Part of the militia was called out again to release regulars for service in suppressing the Indian Mutiny in 1857:

- King's Own (1st Staffordshire) Militia: embodied from 3 November 1857 to 30 November 1860
- King's Own (2nd Staffordshire) Light Infantry Militia: embodied from 28 September 1857 to 31 July 1860

Militia battalions now had a large cadre of permanent staff (about 30). Around a third of the recruits and many young officers went on to join the Regular Army. The Militia Reserve introduced in 1867 consisted of present and former militiamen who undertook to serve overseas in case of war.

== Cardwell and Childers reforms ==
Under the 'Localisation of the Forces' scheme introduced by the Cardwell Reforms of 1872, Militia regiments were brigaded with Regular and Volunteer battalions in a regimental district sharing a permanent depot at a suitable county town. The militia now came under the War Office rather than their county lords lieutenant, and officers' commissions were signed by the Queen. Two pairs of regular battalions were assigned to Staffordshire: 38th (1st Staffordshire) Regiment of Foot and the 80th Regiment of Foot (Staffordshire Volunteers) in Sub-District No 19; 64th (2nd Staffordshire) Regiment of Foot and 98th (The Prince of Wales's) Regiment of Foot in Sub-District No 20. The 1st Staffordshire Militia was attached to the first pair (38th/80th), the 2nd and 3rd Staffordshire Militia to the second pair (64th/98th). It was intended that each sub-district would have two regular and two militia battalions, and so the 1st Staffordshire Militia raised a 2nd Battalion on 22 August 1874. All these battalions eventually shared a depot at Whittington Barracks, outside Lichfield, completed in 1881.

Although often referred to as brigades, the sub-districts were purely administrative organisations, but in a continuation of the Cardwell Reforms a mobilisation scheme began to appear in the Army List from December 1875. This assigned regular and militia units to places in an order of battle of corps, divisions and brigades for the 'Active Army', even though these formations were entirely theoretical, with no staff or services assigned. The 1st, 2nd and 3rd Staffordshire Militia formed 2nd Brigade of 2nd Division, VI Corps. The brigade would have mustered at Liverpool in time of war.

The Childers Reforms of 1881 completed the Cardwell process by converting the linked regular regiments into county regiments and incorporating the militia battalions into them:

- King's Own (1st Staffordshire) Militia became 3rd and 4th Bns, South Staffordshire Regiment (38th/80th)
- King's Own (2nd Staffordshire) Light Infantry Militia: became 3rd Bn, Prince of Wales's (North Staffordshire Regiment) (64th/98th)
- King's Own (3rd Staffordshire) Rifle Militia became 4th Bn, Prince of Wales's (North Staffordshire Regiment

Although Cardwell's army corps scheme had been abandoned, the Stanhope Memorandum of 1888 proposed that the home defence army should consist of three corps, of which the first two would be regular, and the bulk of the third would be militia, while the rest of the militia and the volunteers would be assigned to fixed defences round London and the seaports.

=== Second Boer War ===
After the disasters of Black Week at the start of the Second Boer War in December 1899, most of the regular army was sent to South Africa, followed by many militia reservists as reinforcements. Militia units were embodied to replace them for home defence and a number volunteered for active service or to garrison overseas stations. All four militia battalions of Staffordshire regiments served a tour of duty in South Africa. Their embodiments were as follows:

- South Staffordshire Regiment
  - 3rd Bn: 3 May to 4 December 1900 and 6 May 1901 to 19 July 1902; served in South Africa from 10 July 1901 to 2 July 1902, guarding Boer prisoners of war and blockhouse lines
  - 4th Bn: 5 December 1899 to 12 August 1901; served in Ireland and then with 20th Brigade in South Africa defending Lindley against attack and then participating in the attack on Leeuw Kop. Later guarded convoys and blockhouses before returning home on 11 August
- North Staffordshire Regiment
  - 3rd Bn: 2 May to 15 October 1900 and 10 February to 23 September 1902; served in South Africa from 26 March 1902, guarding blockhouses and participating in 'drives' to round up Boer guerrillas
  - 4th Bn: 24 January 1900 to 11 June 1902; served in South Africa from 29 March 1900 to 13 JUne 1902, guarding prisoners and defending Fraserburg against a heavy attack

== Special Reserve ==
After the Boer War, the future of the militia was called into question. There were moves to reform the Auxiliary Forces (Militia, Yeomanry and Volunteers) to take their place in the six army corps proposed by the Secretary of State for War, St John Brodrick. However, little of Brodrick's scheme was carried out. Under the more sweeping Haldane Reforms of 1908, the Militia was replaced by the Special Reserve (SR), a semi-professional force whose role was to provide reinforcement drafts for regular units serving overseas in wartime, rather like the earlier Militia Reserve. All four Staffordshire militia battalions transferred to the SR, the 3rd battalions being designated 'Reserve' and the 4th battalions 'Extra Reserve'.

== World War I ==
=== Mobilisation ===
The SR was mobilised on 4 August 1914 at the outbreak of World War I and the four Staffordshire battalions proceeded from Whittington Barracks to their war stations. For the 3rd (Reserve) Battalions of the South and North Staffs this was at Plymouth, and for the 4th (Extra Reserve) Battalions this was on the Channel Islands, the South Staffs on Jersey and the North Staffs on Guernsey. At these stations the SR battalions combined defence responsibilities with training and forming drafts of reservists, special reservists, recruits and returning wounded for the regular battalions of the two regiments.

In October 1914 each SR battalion was ordered to use their surplus recruits to form a service battalion of their regiment for Kitchener's 4th New Army ('K4'). In this way the 10th and 11th South Staffords and the 10th and 11th North Staffords were formed by the former Staffordshire Militia battalions. In April 1915 the K4 service battalions were converted into reserve battalions to carry out the same role for the 1st–3rd New Army (K1–K3) battalions that the SR battalions were doing to the Regulars. In 1916 the K4 reserve battalions were transferred from their regiments to the Training Reserve.

Both 3rd Battalions moved from Plymouth to the Newcastle upon Tyne area in November 1916 and remained there in the Tyne Garrison for the rest of the war. In September 1916 the 4th Battalions both moved to Marske-by-the-Sea in the Tees Garrison. Until June 1917 their training and defence role was the same as the 3rd Battalions'; however at that point they were sent to Canterbury in Kent to join 67th (2nd Home Counties) Division of the Territorial Force (TF). The division was being prepared for active service, but this was cancelled, and the two Staffordshire battalions were sent to the Western Front independently. They were thus among the few SR units (mainly 'Extra Reserve' battalions) actually to see overseas service in the war.

=== 4th (Extra Reserve) Bn, South Staffordshires ===
In October 1917 this battalion joined 25th Division, a Kitchener formation. It was in reserve when the Germans launched their Spring Offensive on 21 March 1918. They held off several attacks but suffered heavy casualties while extricating themselves as Third Army fell back. Reinforced with raw 19-year-olds, the division was moved to the quieter Flanders front, where the Germans chose to launch the second phase of their offensive (the Battle of the Lys). 4th South Staffs held a salient at Ploegsteert ('Plugstreet') Wood and was virtually destroyed, losing its commanding officer captured. It fought on as part of a composite battalion until the division was withdrawn. After receiving a few reinforcements, the battalion was involved in a counter-attack at the Second Battle of Kemmel that the Official Historian described as a 'useless waste of life'.

25th Division was now sent to the 'quiet' Chemin des Dames ridge sector of the French front to recover and to absorb young recruits. Unfortunately, it was once more placed exactly where the next phase of the German offensive would fall: the Third Battle of the Aisne. The attack opened with the heaviest bombardment so far, which overwhelmed the front line troops; soon 25th Division in reserve remained as the only intact formation. For a while it held on, then was swept back in the retreat. Soon the division could only provide a composite brigade, with 4th South Staffs temporarily combined with 11th Lancashire Fusiliers as one of its battalions, sent to help 50th (Northumbrian) Division. After the battle, the rest of 25th Division went back to the UK to be reconstructed with recruits. 4th South Staffs remained in France as a training cadre with 39th Division, running training courses for newly arrived US Army divisions before they went into the line. It was demobilised on 6 November, just before the Armistice with Germany.

=== 4th (Extra Reserve) Bn, North Staffordshires ===
In October 1917 4th North Staffs was attached to 56th (1/1st London) Division (TF) for training in Trench warfare, then joined 35th Division, another Kitchener formation. The division was in GHQ Reserve when the Spring Offensive opened, and was sent south as reinforcements. The battalion went into action on 24 March in a counter-attack to clear Maricourt Wood. On 26 March the division was withdrawn across the River Ancre, but due to a misunderstanding the 4th North Staffs was sent back across the river, and found itself isolated. It was not until 01.30 the following morning that it extricated itself from its dangerous position. The battalion then successfully defended its position on the Ancre.

35th Division spent the summer engaged in trench warfare at Aveluy Wood, then it was moved to the Ypres Salient. As the Allied Hundred Days Offensive got under way further south, the Germans on this front began to withdraw. Second Army began to follow up (the Fifth Battle of Ypres). By late October the situation had changed to open warfare, as 35th Division advanced along the River Scheldt. On 9 November 4 South Staffs was among the units that scrambled across the river by any means possible, and was pursuing eastwards when the Armistice came into force on 11 November. In January 1919 the division was used to quell disturbances among men awaiting demobilisation in camps at Calais. The battalion itself went home in April and was disembodied on 28 April 1919.

=== Postwar ===
The SR resumed its old title of Militia in 1921 but like most militia battalions the Staffordshires remained in abeyance after World War I. By the outbreak of World War II in 1939, the only officer remaining listed for any of the four battalions was the Honorary Colonel of the 3rd South Staffs. The Militia was formally disbanded in April 1953.

== Precedence ==
In the early days militia regiments serving together drew lots for their relative precedence. From 1778 the counties were given an order of precedence determined by ballot each year; for Staffordshire the positions drawn were:

- 40th on 1 June 1778
- 31st on 12 May 1779
- 23rd on 6 May 1780
- 19th on 28 April 1781
- 10th on 7 May 1782

However, when the militia were re-embodied in 1793, the order of precedence balloted for that year (when Staffordshire was 27th) remained in force throughout the French Revolutionary War: this covered all the regiments formed in the county. Another ballot for precedence took place at the start of the Napoleonic War, when Staffordshire was 2nd. This list continued until 1833. In that year the King drew the lots for individual regiments: those raised before the peace of 1763 took the first 47 places, followed by the regiments raised between 1763 and 1783, with the Staffordshires at 66th. This permanent list was revised in 1855:

- King's Own (1st Staffordshire): 66th
- King's Own (2nd Staffordshire): 58th
- King's Own (3rd Staffordshire): 78th

In line with most other militia regiments the Staffordshires paid little attention to the additional number.

== See also ==
- Trained Bands
- Militia (English)
- Militia (Great Britain)
- Militia (United Kingdom)
- Special Reserve
- King's Own (1st Staffordshire) Militia
- King's Own (2nd Staffordshire) Light Infantry Militia
- King's Own (3rd Staffordshire) Rifle Militia
- South Staffordshire Regiment
- North Staffordshire Regiment
