= King's Own (2nd Staffordshire) Light Infantry Militia =

Auxiliary unit of the British Army

King's Own (2nd Staffordshire) Light Infantry Militia 3rd Bn, North Staffordshire Regiment
- Active: 5 January 1853–1 April 1953
- Country: United Kingdom
- Branch: Militia/Special Reserve
- Role: Infantry
- Size: Battalion
- Garrison/HQ: Stafford; Whittington Barracks, Lichfield
- Engagements: Second Boer War

Commanders
- Notable commanders: Hon Edward Littleton

The King's Own (2nd Staffordshire) Light Infantry Militia, later the 3rd Battalion, North Staffordshire Regiment was an auxiliary (Note: It is incorrect to describe the British Militia as 'irregular': throughout their history they were equipped and trained exactly like the line regiments of the Regular Army, and once embodied in time of war they were fulltime professional soldiers for the duration of their enlistment.) regiment raised in Staffordshire in the West Midlands of England in 1853. Under the Cardwell and Childers Reforms it became part of the North Staffordshire Regiment and saw active service during the Second Boer War. During World War I it trained thousands of reinforcements for the battalions serving overseas. After a shadowy postwar existence it was formally disbanded in 1953.

== Background ==
The universal obligation to military service in the Shire levy was long established in England and its legal basis was updated by two acts of 1557 (4 & 5 Ph. & M. cc. 2 and 3), which placed selected men, the 'trained bands', under the command of Lords Lieutenant appointed by the monarch. This is seen as the starting date for the organised county militia in England. The Staffordshire Trained Bands saw some active service during the English Civil War. The Militia was re-established in 1662 after the Restoration of the Monarchy, and was popularly seen as the 'Constitutional Force' in contrast to the 'Standing Army' that was tainted by association with the New Model Army that had supported the military dictatorship of The Protectorate. However, the militia declined in the years after the Peace of Utrecht in 1713. Under threat of French invasion during the Seven Years' War a series of Militia Acts from 1757 reinvigorated county militia regiments, the men being conscripted by means of parish ballots (paid substitutes were permitted) to serve for three years. There was a property qualification for officers, who were commissioned by the lord lieutenant. The Midland counties further from the threat of invasion were generally apathetic: Staffordshire was given a quota of 560 men to raise, but the county leaders failed to do so, and paid a fine instead.

It was not until the War of American Independence, when Britain was threatened with invasion by the Americans' allies, France and Spain, that the Staffordshire Militia was reformed on 7 February 1777. It served until 1783 and was called out again at the beginning of the French Revolutionary War. Additional quotas (the Supplementary Militia) were called up in 1797 – Staffordshire's quota rose to 2095 men – and the following year the 2nd and 3rd Staffordshire Militia were formed from these men. In 1799 there was a recruiting drive to get militiamen to volunteer for the Regulars. The colonel of the 2nd Staffordshire Militia, Lord Granville Leveson-Gower, previously a captain in the 1st Regiment, offered to raise a regiment for foreign service and soon obtained 300 recruits from the three Staffordshire regiments; however, King George III objected and the plan was scrapped. The following year the militia quotas were reduced, the 2nd and 3rd Staffordshires were disbanded and their remaining men incorporated into the 1st Regiment. After the Peace of Amiens broke down in 1803, the militia were embodied once more, and a new 2nd Staffordshire Militia was formed, commanded by Francis Perceval Eliot, previously colonel of the 3rd Regiment, who was commissioned on 28 June. After several periods of duty guarding the royal residences, George III commanded in 1805 that the 1st Staffordshire Militia should become the King's Own Staffordshire Militia, and it was augmented by 200 men from the 2nd Regiment, which was disbanded. The King's Own served until the end of the Napoleonic Wars.

=== 1852 Reforms ===
After the Battle of Waterloo there was another long peace. Although officers continued to be commissioned into the militia and ballots were still held until they were suspended by the Militia Act 1829, the regiments were rarely assembled for training and the permanent staffs of sergeants and drummers (who were occasionally used to maintain public order) were progressively reduced. The Militia of the United Kingdom was revived by the Militia Act 1852, enacted during a renewed period of international tension. As before, units were raised and administered on a county basis, and filled by voluntary enlistment (although conscription by means of the Militia Ballot might be used if the counties failed to meet their quotas). Training was for 56 days on enlistment, then for 21–28 days per year, during which the men received full army pay. Under the Act, Militia units could be embodied by Royal Proclamation for full-time home defence service in three circumstances:

1. 'Whenever a state of war exists between Her Majesty and any foreign power'.
2. 'In all cases of invasion or upon imminent danger thereof'.
3. 'In all cases of rebellion or insurrection'.

== King's Own (2nd Staffordshire) Light Infantry ==
Under this Act, two new militia regiments were raised in Staffordshire in 1853, the King's Own (2nd Staffordshire) Light Infantry Militia (Note: At other times it was referred to in official documents as 'The (King's Own) 2nd Staffordshire Militia (Light Infantry)' or '2nd Regiment of King's Own Staffordshire Militia'.) and the King's Own (3rd Staffordshire) Rifle Militia; the original regiment was redesignated the King's Own (1st Staffordshire) Militia.The new 2nd Regiment was raised on 5 January 1853 at Lichfield, and gained its Light Infantry designation in March. The new regiment established its headquarters (HQ) at Stafford; the colonel was the Hon Edward Littleton, MP, formerly of the Staffordshire Yeomanry, with Henry, Earl of Uxbridge, MP, formerly of the Grenadier Guards, as his lieutenant-colonel. (The Earl of Uxbridge succeeded as 2nd Marquess of Anglesey the following year, and resigned his commission in 1855.) When the list of militia precedence (originally assigned by lot) was revised in 1855, the 2nd Staffordshires received the vacant number 58th, ranking them above the 1st Staffordshires at 66th; in line with most other militia regiments the Staffordshires paid little attention to the additional number.

=== Crimean War and after ===
War having broken out with Russia in March 1854 and an expeditionary force sent to the Crimea, the militia were called out for home defence. The 2nd Staffords were embodied for full-time service from 19 December 1854 to 16 June 1856. The regiment was embodied again on 28 September 1857 to release regulars for service in suppressing the Indian Mutiny. By May 1859 it was serving at Cork, moving to the Curragh the following month, and then to Dublin in December, where it stayed until the end of its embodied service. It was disembodied on 31 July 1860. During this period it supplied 417 trained men to the regular army.

Thereafter the regiment carried out the usual round of annual training. The Hon Edward Littleton succeeded as 2nd Baron Hatherton in 1863; he continued in command until 1883, when he became the regiment's Honorary Colonel. The Militia Reserve introduced in 1867 consisted of present and former militiamen who undertook to serve overseas in case of war. In 1870 all three Staffordshire Militia regiments took part in a field day on Stafford Common.

=== Cardwell reforms ===
Under the 'Localisation of the Forces' scheme introduced by the Cardwell Reforms of 1872, militia regiments were brigaded with their local Regular and Volunteer battalions – for the King's Own (2nd Staffordshire) Militia this was with the 64th (2nd Staffordshire) Regiment of Foot, the 98th (The Prince of Wales's) Regiment of Foot and the King's Own (3rd Staffordshire) Rifle Militia in Sub-District No 20 (County of Stafford). The Militia now came under the War Office rather than their county lords lieutenant. The regiment had a 900 yards (820 m) rifle range about 2 miles (3.2 km) outside Stafford. On 1 December 1875 the regiment had a strength of 1114 men, 84 short of its full establishment. Whittington Barracks was completed on Whittington Heath outside Lichfield in 1881 as a combined depot for the north and south Staffordshire brigades.

Although often referred to as brigades, the sub-districts were purely administrative organisations, but in a continuation of the Cardwell Reforms a mobilisation scheme began to appear in the Army List from December 1875. This assigned regular and militia units to places in an order of battle of corps, divisions and brigades for the 'Active Army', even though these formations were entirely theoretical, with no staff or services assigned. The 1st, 2nd and 3rd Staffordshire Militia formed 2nd Brigade of 2nd Division, VI Corps. The brigade would have mustered at Liverpool in time of war.

== 3rd Battalion, North Staffordshire Regiment ==
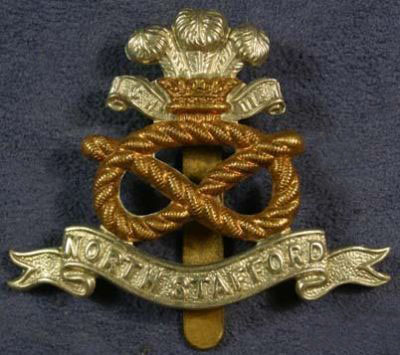
Cap badge of the North Staffordshire Regiment, showing the Stafford knot surmounted by the Prince of Wales's feathers.

The Childers Reforms of 1881 took Cardwell's reforms further, with the linked regiments becoming two-battalion regiments and the militia formally joining them. On 1 July the 64th and 98th Foot became the 1st and 2nd Battalions of the Prince of Wales's (North Staffordshire Regiment) (the 'North Staffs') and the King's Own (2nd Staffordshire) Light Infantry Militia became the 3rd Battalion (the 3rd Staffordshire Militia became the 4th Bn). Militia battalions now had a large cadre of permanent staff (about 30). Around a third of the recruits and many young officers went on to join the Regular Army.

Although Cardwell's army corps scheme had been abandoned, the Stanhope Memorandum of 1888 proposed that the home defence army should consist of three corps, of which the first two would be regular, and the bulk of the third would be militia, while the rest of the militia and the volunteers would be assigned to fixed defences round London and the seaports.

=== Second Boer War ===
After the disasters of Black Week at the start of the Second Boer War in December 1899, most of the regular army was sent to South Africa, and many militia units were called out to replace them for home defence. The 3rd North Staffs was embodied from 2 May to 15 October 1900. However, the war – which seemed to be over in late 1900 – dragged on for a further two years. The 3rd North Staffs volunteered for overseas service and were embodied again on 10 February 1902.

The battalion embarked with a strength of 27 officers and 525 other ranks (ORs) and disembarked at Cape Town on 26 March 1902. It proceeded to Vryburg and was employed in fortifying the town. Then it was sent south to guard 38 miles (61 km) of railway, constructing and manning blockhouses at half-mile intervals. On one occasion two of the blockhouses were heavily attacked. A company proceeding up the line was ambushed, but the Boers were driven off by the Armoured train. A 100-strong party from the battalion took part in a big 'drive' to the north of Vryburg which resulted in 20,000 head of cattle being captured and 600 Boers surrendering. The war was ended by the Treaty of Vereeniging on 31 May. The battalion went home and was disembodied on 23 September 1902. During its short campaign it had lost 10 ORs killed or died of disease. The participants received the Queen's South Africa Medal with the clasps for 'Cape Colony' and 'South Africa 1902'.

== Special Reserve ==
After the Boer War, the future of the militia was called into question. There were moves to reform the Auxiliary Forces (Militia, Yeomanry and Volunteers) to take their place in the six army corps proposed by the Secretary of State for War, St John Brodrick. However, little of Brodrick's scheme was carried out. Under the more sweeping Haldane Reforms of 1908, the Militia was replaced by the Special Reserve (SR), a semi-professional force whose role was to provide reinforcement drafts for regular units serving overseas in wartime, rather like the earlier Militia Reserve. The battalion became the 3rd (Reserve) Battalion, North Staffordshire Regiment, on 5 July 1908.

== World War I ==
=== 3rd (Reserve) Battalion ===
The 3rd Bn was embodied at Whittington Barracks on the outbreak of World War I on 4 August 1914 under the command of Lt-Col C.H. James, who had been CO since 31 July 1911. Among the other officers was Capt the Hon William Littleton, grandson of the regiment's first CO.

The battalion proceeded to its war station at Plymouth, where it served alongside the 3rd (Reserve) Battalion, South Staffordshire Regiment (the former 1st Stafford Militia). While there it formed the 10th (Reserve) Battalion, North Staffs, to provide reinforcements for Kitchener's Army units (see below). In May 1915 the 3rd Bn moved to Seaham, and by November 1916 it was at Forest Hall, Newcastle upon Tyne, where it stayed for the remainder of the war in the Tyne Garrison. As well as its defence responsibilities, the battalion's role was to train and form drafts of reservists, special reservists, recruits and returning wounded for the 1st Bn North Staffs serving with the British Expeditionary Force (BEF) on the Western Front (the 2nd Bn spent the war in India and would have required fewer reinforcements). Thousands of reinforcements would have passed through the 3rd Bn. It was finally disembodied on 28 July 1919, when its remaining personnel were posted to the 1st Bn.

=== 10th (Reserve) Battalion ===
After Lord Kitchener issued his call for volunteers in August 1914, the battalions of the 1st, 2nd and 3rd New Armies ('K1', 'K2' and 'K3' of 'Kitchener's Army') were quickly formed at the regimental depots. The SR battalions also swelled with new recruits and were soon well above their establishment strength. On 8 October 1914 each SR battalion was ordered to use the surplus to form a service battalion of the 4th New Army ('K4'). Accordingly, the 3rd (Reserve) Bn at Plymouth formed the 10th (Service) Bn of the North Staffs. In December it moved to Okehampton, where it trained for active service as part of 99th Brigade in 33rd Division. On 10 April 1915 the War Office decided to convert the K4 battalions into 2nd Reserve units, providing drafts for the K1–K3 battalions in the same way that the SR was doing for the Regular battalions. The 10th Bn became 10th (Reserve) Battalion in 1st Reserve Brigade and in November 1915 it moved to Rugeley Camp on Cannock Chase in Staffordshire, where it trained drafts for the 7th, 8th and 9th (Service) Bns of the North Staffs. On 1 September 1916 the 2nd Reserve battalions were transferred to the Training Reserve and the 10th (R) Bn became 3rd Training Reserve Bn, still in 1st Reserve Bde at Rugeley. The training staff retained their North Staffs badges. On 1 September 1917 the battalion was redesignated 276th (Infantry) Bn, Training Reserve', and on 24 September it joined 200th Bde in 67th Division at Canterbury, Kent. There, on 27 October, it was transferred to the Northumberland Fusiliers as 52nd (Graduated) Bn. On 5 March 1918 it moved to 206th Bde in 69th Division at Barnard Castle in County Durham. By June 1918 it was at Guisborough, where it remained for the rest of the war. After the war ended it was converted into a service battalion on 8 February 1919 and was sent to the British Army of the Rhine, where it was disbanded on 28 March 1919.

=== Postwar ===
The SR resumed its old title of Militia in 1921 but like most militia battalions the 3rd North Staffs remained in abeyance after World War I. By the outbreak of World War II in 1939, there were no officers listed for the battalion. The Militia was formally disbanded in April 1953.

== Heritage and ceremonial ==
=== Honorary Colonels ===
The following served as Honorary Colonel of the regiment:

- Edward Littleton, 2nd Lord Hatherton, CB, former CO, appointed 3 January 1853
- Sir Morton Manningham-Buller, 2nd Baronet, former CO, appointed 11 August 1888

=== Uniforms and insignia ===
The uniform when the 2nd King's Own was formed was red with the blue facings appropriate for a royal regiment. Its badge was the Stafford knot common to all regiments of the county, combined with a light infantry bugle horn. The other ranks' Glengarry cap badge in 1874–81 had the knot within the strings of the bugle horn. On coatee and tunic buttons the knot was displayed below a crown with the letters 'K' and 'O' either side and a scroll below inscribed 'Stafford Lt. Inf.'

When the regiment joined the North Staffordshires in 1881, it adopted the badges and uniform of that regiment, including its white facings.

=== Battle honours ===
The 3rd Battalion was awarded the Battle honour South Africa 1902. After Army Order 251 of 1910, Special Reserve units carried the same battle honours as their parent regiment.

== See also ==
- Staffordshire Militia
- King's Own (1st Staffordshire) Militia
- King's Own (3rd Staffordshire) Rifle Militia
- North Staffordshire Regiment
