= 200th Brigade =

200th Brigade may refer to:

- 200th Separate Guards Motor Rifle Brigade, Russia
- 200th (2/1st Surrey) Brigade, United Kingdom

== See also ==
- 200th Regiment (disambiguation)
