= Mediterranean 1901–02 (battle honour) =

Battle honour of the British Army

Mediterranean 1901–02 was a battle honour awarded to the following Militia battalions of the British Army for their service during the Second Boer War of 1899–1902, when they performed garrison duty in the Mediterranean, relieving regular Army battalions for active service:

- 3rd (2nd West York Militia) Battalion, West Yorkshire Regiment
- 3rd (1st West York Militia) Battalion, King's Own Yorkshire Light Infantry

Personnel of these battalions were awarded the Queen's Mediterranean Medal.

This should not be confused with the award Mediterranean which was awarded for service in the Crimean War and was also held by the 3rd West Yorkshires.

This award was rescinded in 1910 when the Militia (now Special Reserve) battalions assumed the same honours as their parent regiments.
