= King's Own (1st Staffordshire) Militia =

Auxiliary unit of the British Army

King's Own (1st Staffordshire) Militia 3rd & 4th Bns, South Staffordshire Regiment
- Active: 1662–1 April 1953
- Country: Kingdom of England (1662–1707); Kingdom of Great Britain (1707–1800); United Kingdom (1801–1953)
- Branch: Militia/Special Reserve
- Role: Infantry
- Size: 1–2 Battalions
- Garrison/HQ: Whittington Barracks, Lichfield
- Engagements: Second Boer War; World War I; Operation Michael; Battle of the Lys; Battle of the Aisne

Commanders
- Notable commanders: 1st Earl of Uxbridge; 4th Earl of Dartmouth; Sir Wellington Chetwynd-Talbot; Col Michael Swinfen-Broun

The King's Own (1st Staffordshire) Militia, later the 3rd and 4th Battalions, South Staffordshire Regiment was an auxiliary (Note: It is incorrect to describe the British Militia as 'irregular': throughout their history they were equipped and trained exactly like the line regiments of the regular army, and once embodied in time of war they were fulltime professional soldiers for the duration of their enlistment.) regiment in Staffordshire in the West Midlands of England. From 1662, and again after 1777, the regiment's primary role was in home defence and internal security. It was a favourite regiment of King George III, and spent much of the French Revolutionary and Napoleonic Wars protecting the king's residences, being rewarded with the title 'King's Own' in 1805. It served in the Mediterranean garrisons during the Crimean War. Under the Cardwell and Childers Reforms it became part of the South Staffordshire Regiment and raised a second battalion. Both battalions saw active service during the Second Boer War, and trained thousands of reinforcements during World War I. Later, one of the battalions served in combat on the Western Front, being virtually destroyed during the German Spring Offensive. After a shadowy postwar existence the battalions were formally disbanded in 1953.

== Background ==
The universal obligation to military service in the Shire levy was long established in England and its legal basis was updated by two acts of 1557 (4 & 5 Ph. & M. cc. 2 and 3), which placed selected men, the 'trained bands', under the command of Lords Lieutenant appointed by the monarch. This is seen as the starting date for the organised county militia in England. The Staffordshire Trained Bands saw some active service during the English Civil War. The Militia was re-established in 1662 after the Restoration of the Monarchy, and was popularly seen as the 'Constitutional Force' in contrast to the 'Standing Army' that was tainted by association with the New Model Army that had supported the military dictatorship of The Protectorate. However, the militia declined in the years after the Peace of Utrecht in 1713.

== Staffordshire Militia ==
Under threat of French invasion during the Seven Years' War a series of Militia Acts from 1757 reinvigorated county militia regiments, the men being conscripted by means of parish ballots (paid substitutes were permitted) to serve for three years. There was a property qualification for officers, who were commissioned by the lord lieutenant. The Midland counties further from the threat of invasion were generally apathetic: Staffordshire was given a quota of 560 men to raise, but the county leaders failed to do so, and paid a fine instead.

=== American War of Independence ===
Staffordshire remained a defaulter county liable for militia fines throughout the 1760s. It was not until the War of American Independence, when Britain was threatened with invasion by the Americans' allies, France and Spain, that the Staffordshire Militia was reformed. Lord Paget was commissioned as its Colonel on 22 April 1776, the regiment received its first issue of weapons from the Tower of London (when two-thirds of the quota had been achieved) on 7 February 1777, and it was embodied for full-time duty on 31 March 1778. It consisted of eight companies, including the grenadier and light companies, with a ninth, 'Volunteer Company', added during 1778.

The new regiment was at first quartered in Lichfield, but during the summer of 1778 it camped at Winchester before returning to winter quarters in Lichfield in December. In January 1779 three of the companies went to Burton upon Trent; in February five went to Stafford, and the whole regiment was there in July. In August it was again quartered at Lichfield, before marching to Bristol in September, leaving detachments across Hampshire at Andover, Basingstoke, Overton and Whitchurch. These kinds of movements followed a pattern for militia regiments at this time. During 1780 the Staffordshires were quartered at Southampton and Winchester. In the summer they formed part of a brigade under Lieutenant-General Simon Fraser in a training camp at Waterdown Forest, near Tunbridge Wells. They then moved to Liverpool for the winter. In May 1781 they marched to Scarborough, returning to Lichfield in October. In January 1782 the regiment was quartered across Staffordshire at Lichfield, Newcastle-under-Lyme, Stafford, Stone, Rugeley and Penkridge. In June it was ordered to Warley Camp in Essex, then from November it was quartered for the winter in Leighton Buzzard, Amersham and Wendover. Viscount Lewisham was appointed Lieutenant-Colonel on 12 March 1779 and took over as colonel when Lord Paget resigned in 1781.

The war having ended, the regiment was ordered in March 1783 to march to Staffordshire and it was disembodied at Lichfield after seven years' service. Later that year Lord Lewisham resigned the command and Lord Paget, now created Earl of Uxbridge, was re-appointed. Thereafter the militia should have been assembled each year for their 28 days' training, but to save money only two-thirds of the men would be called out each year, and in the case of the Staffordshires training was only held twice between 1784 and 1792.

=== French Revolutionary War ===
The militia was already being embodied when Revolutionary France declared war on Britain on 1 February 1793. The Staffordshire Militia was still commanded by the Earl of Uxbridge. The French Revolutionary Wars saw a new phase for the English militia: they were embodied for a whole generation, and became regiments of full-time professional soldiers (though restricted to service in the British Isles), which the regular army increasingly saw as a prime source of recruits. They served in coast defences, to man garrisons, and guard prisoners of war, and for internal security, while their traditional local defence duties were taken over by the Volunteers and mounted Yeomanry.

In 1793 the Staffordshire Militia marched to Devonshire and was quartered in Plymouth, where it was taught the latest drill. In 1794 and 1795 it was quartered in Weymouth, Dorset, where it came to the notice of King George III who holidayed there. On 22 September 1796 the regiment marched to Shrewsbury where it was quartered for the winter, sending a detachment to Much Wenlock to put down a riot in November. In 1797 it was successively quartered at Liverpool, Dorchester, Weymouth and Winchester. At Weymouth it was again inspected frequently by the king, who requested that it should carry out Royal duties at Windsor Castle the following year. On 10 June 1798 it received its orders, and reached Windsor on 14 June.

In an attempt to have as many men as possible under arms for home defence in order to release Regulars for overseas expeditions, the Government created the Supplementary Militia, a compulsory levy of men to be trained in their spare time, and to be incorporated in the Militia in emergency. Staffordshire's quota was fixed at 2095 men, and two new regiments were embodied at Lichfield in February 1798, so that the original regiment was numbered 1st. In 1799 there was a recruiting drive to get militiamen to volunteer for the Regulars. The colonel of the 2nd Staffordshire Militia, Lord Granville Leveson-Gower, previously a captain in the 1st Regiment, offered to raise a regiment for foreign service and soon obtained 300 recruits from the three Staffordshire regiments; however, the King objected and the plan was scrapped. The following year the militia quotas were reduced, the 2nd and 3rd Staffordshires were disbanded and their remaining men incorporated into the 1st at Windsor.

The Staffordshire Militia returned to winter quarters at Lichfield at the beginning of 1800. It returned to royal duty at Windsor in June, and then spent the summer of 1801 at Weymouth when the Royal Family was in residence, before returning to Windsor in October. The war ended with the Treaty of Amiens in March 1802 and all the militia were stood down. The Staffordshire Militia marched from Windsor to Stafford where it was disembodied on 26 April 1802.

== King's Own Staffordshire Militia ==
The Peace of Amiens was short-lived, and the Staffordshire Militia was embodied again on 30 March 1803. It was ready for duty by 17 May and was immediately ordered to Windsor, where the King rode at its head when it marched into Windsor Barracks. A new 2nd Regiment was raised, commanded by Francis Perceval Eliot, previously colonel of the 3rd Regiment, who was commissioned on 28 June. The 1st Staffordshire Militia accompanied the king to Weymouth in the summer of 1804, returning with him to Windsor in the autumn. In 1805 George III commanded that the regiment should become the King's Own Staffordshire Militia, and it was augmented by 200 men from the 2nd Regiment, which was disbanded. The newly royal regiment gained a second light company.

During the summer of 1805, when Napoleon was massing his 'Army of England' at Boulogne for a projected invasion, the regiment, with 1300 men in 10 companies under Lt-Col Edward Disbrowe, was at Portsea Barracks, forming part of the Portsmouth Garrison under Maj-Gen John Hope. The regiment was then on service at Windsor almost continuously until 1812. In 1813 it was stationed at Colchester, with a detachment guarding the great Prisoner-of-war camp at Norman Cross, but was ordered to London to relieve the Foot Guards at St James's and Kew Palaces. On the death of the Earl of Uxbridge, Major the Earl of Dartmouth (son of the former colonel, Lord Lewisham) was promoted to the command. The regiment was disembodied in 1814 at the end of the Napoleonic War. When Napoleon escaped from Elba in 1815, the regiment was re-embodied while the army was serving in the Waterloo campaign. It served at Stafford and Derby and was finally disembodied in April 1816.

=== 1852 Reforms ===
After Waterloo there was another long peace. Although officers continued to be commissioned into the militia and ballots were still held until they were suspended by the Militia Act 1829, the regiments were rarely assembled for training and the permanent staffs of sergeants and drummers (who were occasionally used to maintain public order) were progressively reduced. The Militia of the United Kingdom was revived by the Militia Act 1852, enacted during a renewed period of international tension. As before, units were raised and administered on a county basis, and filled by voluntary enlistment (although conscription by means of the Militia Ballot might be used if the counties failed to meet their quotas). Training was for 56 days on enlistment, then for 21–28 days per year, during which the men received full army pay. Under the Act, Militia units could be embodied by Royal Proclamation for full-time home defence service in three circumstances:

1. 'Whenever a state of war exists between Her Majesty and any foreign power'.
2. 'In all cases of invasion or upon imminent danger thereof'.
3. 'In all cases of rebellion or insurrection'.

Under this Act, two new militia regiments of were raised in Staffordshire in 1853, the King's Own (2nd Staffordshire) Light Infantry Militia and the King's Own (3rd Staffordshire) Rifle Militia; the original regiment was redesignated the King's Own (1st Staffordshire) Militia. (Note: The title was used inconsistently in official documents: it was also referred to as 'The (King's Own) 1st Staffordshire Militia'.) The 1st Regiment had assembled for 21 day's training at Stafford in November 1852, still under the command of the Earl of Dartmouth, who died during the training period. He was immediately succeeded by Major the Hon W.P.M Talbot, formerly of the Royal Fusiliers, who was confirmed in command as lt-col the following April, just before the annual training at Lichfield.

=== Crimean War ===
War having broken out with Russia in March 1854 and an expeditionary force sent to the Crimea, the militia were called out for home defence. The 1st Staffordshires had assembled 1171 strong for annual training at Lichfield on 20 April, and the lord lieutenant was instructed to extend the training by an extra week. On 16 May the regiment was invited to volunteer for permanent service, and 645 volunteers were selected to be embodied. On 30 May they proceeded to Dover to take on garrison duties. In November, 202 men volunteered to transfer to the regulars, and during the war the regiment supplied 1200 recruits in this way.

In January 1855 the 1st Staffordshire was one of the militia regiments invited to volunteer for overseas service: 596 men did so, and the regiment was the first to be accepted. The service companies embarked at Portsmouth on SS Hansa under the command of Lt-Col Talbot and arrived at Corfu in the Ionian Islands on 15 April. They were stationed at Fort Neuf Barracks. In August the regiment sent a detachment to Ithaca, then n 24 August the main body embarked on the transport Indiana for Argostoli on Cephalonia, from where it sent further detachments to Luxuri and Fort George. From the autumn of 1855 the regiment suffered badly from sickness: 25 men and three women and children died and at one period during the summer of 1856 a third of the regiment at Argostoli was in hospital. On 18 August 1856 three companies embarked for home on the Mauritius and arrived at Lichfield on 16 September. The main body of the regiment embarked on the Prince Arthur on 30 August and reached home on 22 September. The regiment was disembodied on 1 October 1856. It was awarded the Battle honour Mediterranean for this service. Lieutenant-Col Talbot remained as British Resident at Cephalonia until 1860.

=== India Mutiny and after ===
Only the permanent staff were inspected in the summer of 1857, but on 15 October the regiment was called out again to release regulars for service in suppressing the Indian Mutiny. It was embodied at Lichfield on 3 November and was sent to Perth, Stirling and Edinburgh Castle, with a detachment at Greenlaw. On 10 August 1858 the regiment embarked on the troopship Melbourne to move from Edinburgh to Aldershot, where it camped for six weeks on Cove Common and afterwards was accommodated in huts in 'L' Lines, North Camp. It formed part of 1st Brigade and provided Guards of Honour and participated in march-pasts during Royal visits that summer. On 18 September the regiment moved to the Portsmouth area, with headquarters (HQ) at Colewort Barracks and detachments at Gosport, Tipner, Anglesey, Clarence and Cambridge Barracks. Parties attended courses at the School of Musketry at Hythe, Kent, and again provided guards of honour for Royal visits. On 29 May 1860 the regiment sent a detachment to Weymouth to guard convicts at Portland working on the breakwaters, who were in a state of disorder. On 13 September the regiment moved from Portsmouth and Weymouth to Northern District, with HQ at Newcastle upon Tyne, four companies at Sunderland, and one at Tynemouth. On 27 November 1860 the regiment was ordered to return to Staffordshire, where it was disembodied on 30 November.

From 1862 the regiment carried out its training each year, usually preceded by preliminary training for that year's recruits. In 1870 all three Staffordshire Militia regiments took part in a field day on Stafford Common. The regiment had a 900 yards (820 m) rifle range at Brownhills, about 6 miles (9.7 km) from its HQ at Lichfield. The Militia Reserve introduced in 1867 consisted of present and former militiamen who undertook to serve overseas in case of war.

=== Cardwell reforms ===
Under the 'Localisation of the Forces' scheme introduced by the Cardwell Reforms of 1872, militia regiments were brigaded with their local regular and Volunteer battalions – for the King's Own (1st Staffordshire) Militia this was with the 38th (1st Staffordshire) Regiment of Foot and the 80th Regiment of Foot (Staffordshire Volunteers) in Sub-District No 19 (County of Stafford) with a shared depot at Lichfield. The Militia now came under the War Office rather than their county lords lieutenant. It was intended that each sub-district would have two regular and two militia battalions, and the 1st Staffordshire Militia raised a 2nd Battalion on 22 August 1874. This carried out its first annual training in May 1875 and thereafter the two battalions usually trained together. On 1 December 1875 the double-battalion regiment had a strength of 1341, only 9 short of its establishment. Whittington Barracks was completed on Whittington Heath outside Lichfield in 1881 as a combined depot for the north and south Staffordshire brigades.

Although often referred to as brigades, the sub-districts were purely administrative organisations, but in a continuation of the Cardwell Reforms a mobilisation scheme began to appear in the Army List from December 1875. This assigned regular and militia units to places in an order of battle of corps, divisions and brigades for the 'Active Army', even though these formations were entirely theoretical, with no staff or services assigned. The 1st, 2nd and 3rd Staffordshire Militia formed 2nd Brigade of 2nd Division, VI Corps. The brigade would have mustered at Liverpool in time of war.

On 26 April 1873, Col Talbot resigned the command and was appointed Honorary Colonel of the regiment. Major Francis Chambers was promoted to the command, and when he retired in 1876, Lt-Col Pryce Harrison of the 2nd Bn was promoted to colonel and lt-col commandant, and Col Talbot's nephew, Maj Hervey Talbot, formerly of the 18th Foot, took command of 2nd Bn. He in turn later became commandant of both battalions.

The Army Reserves were called out on 3 April 1878 during the crisis that led to the Congress of Berlin. The Militia Reserves of 1st Bn 1st Staffordshire Militia were summoned and 104 reported, overwhelming the accommodation at Whittington Barracks where that year's recruits were undergoing preliminary training. These reservists served with the 38th (1st Staffordshire) Regiment in Dublin until they were stood down on 20 July.

== 3rd and 4th Battalions, South Staffordshire Regiment ==
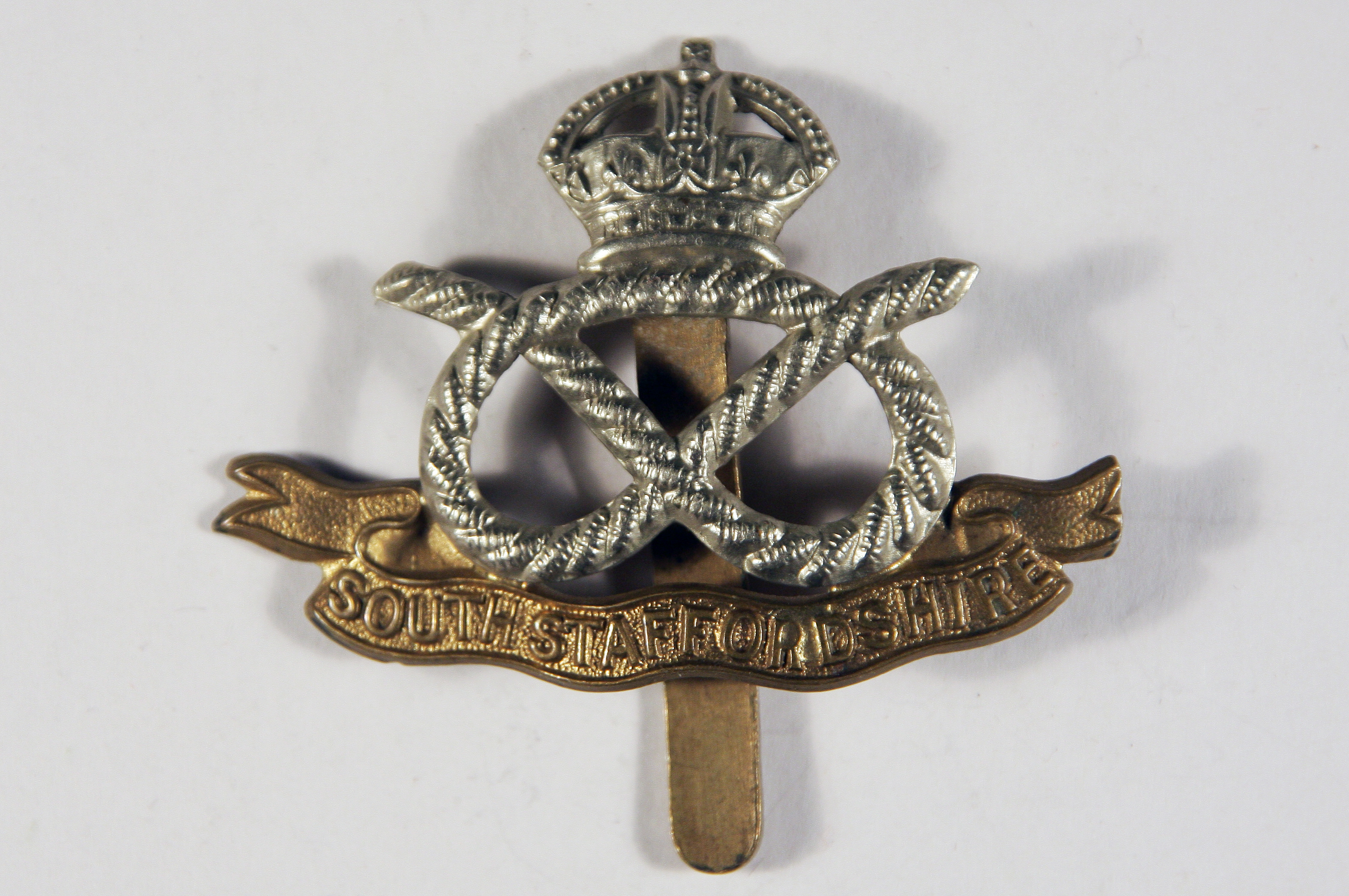
Cap badge of the South Staffordshire Regiment, including the Stafford knot.

The Childers Reforms of 1881 took Cardwell's reforms further, with the linked regiments becoming two-battalion regiments and the militia formally joining them. On 1 July the 38th and 80th Foot became the 1st and 2nd Battalions of the South Staffordshire Regiment (the 'South Staffs') and the 1st and 2nd Bns of the King's Own (1st Staffordshire) Militia became the 3rd and 4th Battalions, still administered as a double-battalion regiment. Militia battalions now had a large cadre of permanent staff (about 30). Around a third of the recruits and many young officers went on to join the Regular Army.

Annual training for the two battalions continued, usually camping on Whittington Heath. When Col Hervey Talbot died on 11 September 1884, he was succeeded in command by Lt-Col R.J.E. Eustace of the 4th Bn, formerly lt-col in the 60th Rifles. When Col Eustace died in 1889, Lt-Col W.G. Webb of 4th Bn succeeded him. Annual training for 3rd Bn in 1892 was carried out at Altcar, near Liverpool, and in 1896 both battalions took part in the army manoeuvres at Aldershot, forming part of Lord Methuen's Division. In 1898 they took part in the manoeuvres on Salisbury Plain, brigaded with 1st Bn South Staffs in 'Northern Army'. In 1899 Col Michael Swinfen-Broun was promoted colonel commandant of the 3rd and 4th Battalions in succession to Col Webb. However, on 1 August 1900 the two battalions became separate entities.

Although Cardwell's army corps scheme had been abandoned, the Stanhope Memorandum of 1888 proposed that the home defence army should consist of three corps, of which the first two would be regular, and the bulk of the third would be militia, while the rest of the militia and the volunteers would be assigned to fixed defences round London and the seaports.

=== Second Boer War ===
==== 4th (1st King's Own Staffordshire Militia) Battalion ====
On the outbreak of the Second Boer War in 1899 the 4th Bn was one of the first militia units called out, even though the South Staffs did not at the time have a regular battalion serving in South Africa. It was embodied on 5 December and left the same evening for duty in Ireland. It embarked at Milford Haven and on arrival at Cork two companies went to Spike Island, one to Fort Camden at Queenstown Harbour and the remainder to Kinsale, where one company occupied Charles Fort. After the disasters of Black Week in December, most of the regular army was sent out, and further militia units were embodied, not only for home defence but also to serve in South Africa. The entire 4th Bn volunteered, and on 12 February 1900 it boarded the transport Arundel Castle at Queenstown under the command of Lt-Col F. Charrington.

4th Battalion South Staffs disembarked at Cape Town on 8 March with a strength of 23 officers and 602 other ranks (ORs); the machine gun section (1 officer and 8 ORs) followed by a later ship. The battalion reached Kimberley on 11 March, then HQ with A, B, C and G Companies went to Modder River on 16 March. On 24 March the other four companies under Maj Seckham left Kimberley with a column under Lord Methuen, marching via Barkly West and Dikgatlong to Dronfield, arriving on 31 March, where they were joined by the rest of the battalion on 3 April. At Dronfield B and F Companies were quartered at Riverton Pumping Station on the Vaal, and C and D Companies at Macfarlanes's Farm on the railway.

It had been intended to employ militia units in garrisons and on lines of communication. However, the battalion was assigned to 20th Brigade. in Methuen's 1st Division. On 3 May half the battalion went to Warrenton where the brigade made a demonstration while another division forced the Vaal at Fourteen Streams on 4 May. Owing to a mistake in orders the 4th South Staffs were hurried back to Kimberley, before moving on 12 May to Boshof where Methuen's division was concentrating. Methuen was tasked with guarding the left flank of Lord Roberts' advance through the Transvaal. Marching through Orange Free State, it captured Hoopstad by a surprise night attack on 19 May, then marched to relieve Lindley. Methuen's men earned the nickname of 'the Mobile Marvels' for their hard marching. At the end of May Methuen continued on to relieve Heilbron, leaving 20th Bde to garrison Lindley. 4th South Staffs covered the south-east and south of the town, where they were under constant sniping by the Boers, and shellfire from 16 June onwards, while supply columns had to fight their way in. On 26 June there was sharp firing, then the Boers attacked a number of the picquets; E Company, 4th South Staffs, held No 7 Picquet and was engaged in a heavy exchange of fire but maintained its position with support from the HQ trenches behind until the Boer were driven off. On 2 July the battalion with its machine gun demonstrated on the ridge east of town while the mounted troops left Lindley and cleared the country toward Leeuw Kop. Next day Lindley was evacuated and the infantry moved to carry the Boer position at Leeuw Kop with artillery support. The column then followed the Boers towards Bethlehem. During the attack on Bethlehem, the 4th South Staffs were deployed with two companies escorting two 5-inch howitzers, two covering the left flank of the attack, and the remainder guarding the convoy and rear. The brigade remained in Bethlehem until 15 July.

20th Brigade marched out in pursuit on 15 July, and next day 4th South Staffs came under shellfire while covering the supply convoy. On 17 July half the battalion escorted the empty convoy back to Winburg, then returned with a full convoy on 30 July. Commandant Prinsloo and some 4000 Boers had surrendered in the Brandwater Basin, and 20th Bde now escorted them to Winburg on 9 August, with 4th South Staffs guarding the Wepener Commando of 550 men. From Winburg detachments of the battalion went down by daily trains to Cape Town in charge of prisoners. While at Winburg the battalion received a draft of 115 reinforcements from home as well as – unusually – a detachment of 150 men from the regular 1st Bn, who served with the militia battalion until the end of its service in South Africa.

By now the Boers in Orange Free State had broken up into small parties, and British forces spent many months pursuing them, especially the guerrillas led by Christiaan de Wet (in the 'Great de Wet Hunt'). For the rest of the war, formal divisional and brigade organisations dissolved into ad hoc columns formed and reformed for specific tasks. The 4th South Staffs formed part of the 1500-strong garrison of Winburg, commanded by Col Charrington. Until October the Boers were continually round Winburg in varying strengths, skirmishing with mounted columns, damaging the railway and on occasion attacking or shelling the defences of the town. On 28 February 1901 a column was formed at Winburg to move out towards Doornberg, to which 4th South Staffs supplied 160 men. This column was out until 18 March, occupying Ventersburg and suffering a few casualties missing. Later the battalion guarded the blockhouse line along the Winburg–Smaldeel railway. On 6 April a force of Boers attacked No 2 Railway Picquet, 6 miles (9.7 km) from Smaldeel, held by one non-commissioned officer and 15 men of the battalion. After 2 hours' heavy firing, the Boers were driven off, but later they were able to creep up and capture No 3 Picquet. Another picquet on cattle guard was captured on 22 June. All these prisoners and 'missing' were released in May and June.

On 15 July the battalion was relieved and went by train to Cape Town. There it embarked aboard the transport Lake Erie for home. They disembarked at Southampton on 11 August and next day marched through the crowded streets of Lichfield to Whittington Barracks to be disembodied.During more than 20 months' service the battalion had lost 41 men killed, died of wounds or sickness. The participants received the Queen's South Africa Medal with the clasps for 'South Africa 1901', 'Cape Colony' and 'Wittebergen' – the only militia unit to receive the latter clasp, awarded for operations round Bethlehem in July 1900.

==== 3rd (1st King's Own Staffordshire Militia) Battalion ====
The 3rd Bn was embodied on 3 May 1900, and after serving in the UK was disembodied on 4 December 1900. The battalion was embodied again on 6 May 1901, and volunteered for overseas service, effectively to replace the 4th Bn.

The 3rd South Staffs embarked on the Bavarian at Southampton on 17 June 1901, and landed at Cape Town on 10 July, with 20 officers and 561 ORs under Lt-Col Michael Swinfen-Broun. It was first placed in charge of Boer prisoners at Simon's Town with two companies on detachment at Stellenbosch and Sir Lowry's Pass Village. In September Battalion HQ moved for s short time to Stellenbosch. At the end of December the battalion took over a new line of blockhouses extending over 100 miles (160 km) from the coast at Lambert's Bay via Calvinia to Victoria West, with HQ at Clanwilliam.

The battalion embarked for the UK on 2 July 1902 and was disembodied on 19 July, having lost 27 ORs killed in action or died of disease. The participants received the Queen's South Africa Medal with the clasps for 'Cape Colony', 'South Africa 1901' and 'South Africa 1902'.

== Special Reserve ==
After the Boer War, the future of the militia was called into question. There were moves to reform the Auxiliary Forces (Militia, Yeomanry and Volunteers) to take their place in the six army corps proposed by the Secretary of State for War, St John Brodrick. However, little of Brodrick's scheme was carried out. Under the more sweeping Haldane Reforms of 1908, the Militia was replaced by the Special Reserve (SR), a semi-professional force whose role was to provide reinforcement drafts for regular units serving overseas in wartime, rather like the earlier Militia Reserve. The two battalions became the 3rd (Reserve) and 4th (Extra Reserve) Battalions, South Staffordshire Regiment, on 14 June and 2 August 1908 respectively.

== World War I ==
=== 3rd (Reserve) Battalion ===
The 3rd Bn was embodied at Whittington Barracks on the outbreak of World War I on 4 August 1914 under the command of Lt-Col G. Jones Mytton, who had been CO since 8 March 1911. It then proceeded to its war station at Plymouth. While there it formed the 10th (Reserve) Bn to provide reinforcements for Kitchener's Army units of the South Staffs (see below). In May 1915 the 3rd Bn moved to Sunderland, and by November 1916 it was at Forest Hall, Newcastle upon Tyne, where it stayed for the remainder of the war in the Tyne Garrison. As well as its defence responsibilities, the battalion's role was to train and form drafts of reservists, special reservists, recruits and returning wounded for the two regular battalions of the South Staffs serving with the British Expeditionary Force (BEF) on the Western Front and in Italy. Thousands of reinforcements for these battalions would have passed through the 3rd Bn. It was finally disembodied on 15 August 1919, when its remaining personnel were posted to the 2nd Bn.

=== 4th (Extra Reserve) Battalion ===
Formation sign of 25th Division.

The 4th Bn was also embodied at Whittington Barracks, under the command of Lt-Col E.A.E Bulwer, who had been the regular adjutant of the battalion during the Boer War and had retired from the South Staffs as a captain. He had subsequently joined the SR and had been in command of the battalion since 13 December 1910. Its war station was on Jersey. While there it formed 11th (Reserve) Bn for Kitchener's Army units (see below). In September 1916 the battalion moved to Marske-by-the-Sea near Redcar on the North Yorkshire coast. Here it formed part of a composite infantry brigade with 4th (Extra Reserve) Bn, North Staffordshire Regiment (originally the 3rd (King's Own) Staffordshire Militia Rifles). In June 1917 these two Staffordshire SR battalions joined 67th (2nd Home Counties) Division, replacing two 3rd Line Territorial Force (TF) battalions that had seen sent to join the BEF. 4th South Staffs joined 201st (2/1st Middlesex) Brigade.

67th Division had spent the war so far preparing drafts of reinforcements for 1st Line TF units overseas. In April 1917 it had been ordered to prepare for service with the BEF, but the move never happened. In the end the Staffordshire SR battalions proceeded to France individually. The 4th South Staffs was thus one of the few SR units (mainly 'Extra Reserve' battalions) actually to see overseas service in World War I. 4th South Staffs disembarked at Le Havre on 10 October and three days later joined 7th Brigade in 25th Division. This was a 'Kitchener' Division raised early in the war that had been heavily engaged at the Battle of the Somme in 1916 and the early stages of the Third Battle of Ypres earlier in the summer. When 4th South Staffs joined, the division was still in the Ypres sector under Second Army

When the Germans launched a heavy counter-attack against Third Army after the Battle of Cambrai, Second Army was ordered to send reinforcements, and 25th Division set out by train on 2 December to Bapaume. By the time it arrived, Third Army had pulled back to a shorter line (the Flesquières Salient) and the German attack had been held.

==== Operation Michael ====
25th Division was part of Third Army Reserve, stationed near Bapaume 10 miles (16 km) behind IV Corps in the Flesquières Salient, when the Germans launched their Spring Offensive (Operation Michael) on 21 March 1918. Two brigades and the divisional artillery were sent forward, leaving 7th Bde as Corps Reserve in the partially-prepared trenches of the 'Green Line'. They did not come into action until 23 March, after the front line formations of the corps had been virtually destroyed in two days of stubborn fighting. Although incomplete, the Green Line was well-sited, and its defenders had had two more days to work on it: they drove off six separate attacks on 23 March, some of which got within 30 yards (27 m) of the barbed wire before withering under rifle, machine gun and artillery fire. After a quiet night, the German attacks were renewed against IV Corps' flanks on 24 March, and by the afternoon the right flank division had been pushed back. At 16.00, when the German attack against it had already begun, 7th Bde received orders to swing back from the Green Line to keep touch on the right. Although suffering heavy casualties the battalions managed to extricate themselves and take up the new positions; Bapaume had been evacuated. That evening they were ordered to withdraw behind friendly troops, and again suffered heavy casualties while disengaging. During the night the survivors rejoined 25th Division near Logeast Wood, and spent 25 March in reserve north of Achiet-le-Grand. Most battalions of the division were down to half strength.

==== Battle of the Lys ====
As the first phase of the German offensive died away, the battered 25th Division received reinforcement drafts to bring it back up to an average strength of 800 men per battalion. These were mainly 19-year-olds with 9 months' training. The division then entrained on 30–31 March to rejoin Second Army in the north and went straight into the line while still absorbing the drafts. Unfortunately, the 25th had arrived where the second phase of the German offensive (the Battle of the Lys) was about to be launched. This attack came on 9 April and the division's front was attacked next day (the Battle of Messines). The Germans crossed the River Lys under cover of morning mist and overran or passed between the forward posts. 7th Brigade was forced back, though as the mist cleared the enemy suffered heavy casualties from rifle and artillery fire. Fighting died down about 11.00, by which time 7th Bde was lining the northern edge of Ploegsteert ('Plugstreet') Wood. By next morning this position formed a dangerous salient; 4th South Staffs, very weak after the previous day's fighting, held the blunt apex of the salient with 1st Wiltshire Regiment. The adjacent units were driven back during 11 April, and 7th Bde was ordered to retire. The order went to the 'Catacombs' in Hill 63, where the battalion HQs of 1st Wiltshires and 10th Cheshire Regiment were located; the CO of 4th South Staffs was visiting in search of information when the order arrived, so the three battalion commanders organised the retirement for 17.00. However, a fresh order arrived calling for outposts to remain in position as long as possible before fighting their way back; the COs interpreted this to apply to their whole battalions, so they countermanded the retirement. Shortly after 17.30, Hill 63 and the Catacombs were surrounded and all three battalion commanders captured. Their remaining troops fought the 3 miles (4.8 km) back to a position west of Neuve Eglise, some parties passing through German lines to get there, but casualties were severe. Luckily, fresh troops had reached Neuve Eglise, and 7th Bde (less than a battalion in strength) spent the next day in reserve.

The next attack against 25th Division came in at 05.00 on 13 April (the Battle of Bailleul), covered by fog and without any preliminary bombardment. The division's frontline troops were driven back on 7th Bde, drawn up at 'Crucifix Corner', where the German onrush was halted. By 16 April, after Bailleul fell, the two brigades of 25th Division, 7th and 75th, were temporarily reorganised as '7th Composite Bde' of two battalions, forming virtually the only reserve in the area. The Germans failed to press their attacks on 17 April, and 25th Division was pulled out for rest and reorganisation next day.

After a lull, the Germans resumed their Lys offensive on 25 April (the Second Battle of Kemmel). Second Army had a number of tired divisions, including 25th, spread out behind the front line to increase the depth of the defence. Once again the Germans had morning fog in their favour and made rapid progress against French troops, taking Mont Kemmel, but an Anglo-French counter-attack was arranged for the following morning, for which 25th Division was assigned. The division had been reinforced by recruits from home, but was desperately short of officers and non-commissioned officers. The approach was made in the dark, amid heavy rain, and the supporting artillery fire was weak. Although 25th Division attacked promptly at 03.00, they were unable to keep up with the Creeping barrage in the mud and fog, and 7th Bde with 4th South Staffs in the leading wave encountered uncut wire. The French on the right were 30 minutes late in attacking and made no progress. 7th Brigade was now pinned down in front of the wire, under machine gun fire from its right rear where the French should have been, and about 09.00 was withdrawn to the Kemmelbeck stream, where it dug in. 7th Brigade was withdrawn the following night. The Official History referred to the counter-attack as a 'useless waste of life', and quoted a battalion commander's comment on this 'discreditable affair'.

25th Division was holding the line when the Germans made their final effort of the offensive on 29 April (the Battle of the Scherpenberg) and was offered 'exceptionally good targets'. Although the attack made some progress against the French, and 7th Bde was ordered to form a defensive flank, this was not necessary and the German attack was a disaster. The Lys offensive was over. 25th Division had suffered more casualties than any other British division in this offensive.

==== Chemin des Dames ====
25th Division was now sent to a 'quiet' sector of the French front to recover and to absorb young recruits. It was in reserve for IX Corps, which was deployed along the Chemin des Dames ridge. Unfortunately, the division was once more placed exactly where the next phase of the German offensive would fall: the Third Battle of the Aisne. The attack on 27 May was not a surprise, and 7th Bde had been pushed forward to Guyencourt the night before to be closer to the Green Line behind the frontline divisions. The attack opened with the heaviest bombardment so far, which overwhelmed Allied artillery positions, HQs and communications, and isolated the forward troops. By noon the frontline British divisions (8th and 50th (Northumbrian)) had virtually disappeared, apart from scattered parties falling back to defend the Green Line; only 25th Division remained intact on this front. 7th Brigade was deployed along a line of redoubts from Bouffignereux to Hermonville, about 1 mile (1.6 km) back from the Green Line, but it knew nothing about the positions it was taking up. As the Germans worked their way forward in the early afternoon, 7th Bde was shifted left, where it had a better field of fire on a forward slope. 4th South Staffs formed the centre of the brigade's line in the partly-dug Green Line trenches. The brigade successfully held this line until about 17.30 when it was outflanked on the left. The two flank battalions fell back in diverging directions, creating a gap thinly held by 4th South Staffs supported by sappers and mortar crews. Pushing up the Bouffignereux valley the Germans entered Guyencourt and then Bouvancourt, over 2 miles (3.2 km) behind the Green Line. By 20.00 the survivors of 7th Bde and some stragglers had been pushed back to form some kind of line south of Bouvancourt with 21st Division. This line was attacked again next day, but most of the German army was pushing past on the left, where a hole had been torn in the Allied lines. There followed a long retreat, with the British troops of IX Corps forming the southern hinge of the great bulge forced into the French lines. The front began to stabilise on 31 May and the battle died away by 6 June.

==== Reduction ====
As a result of its heavy casualties 25th Division could only form a composite brigade by 20 June. No 1 Battalion of 25th Composite Bde was provided by the combined 4th South Staffs and 11th Lancashire Fusiliers. On 22 June the composite brigade was transferred to [50th (Northumbrian) Division which had also been reduced to a composite brigade, and the two (25th and 50th) formed 50th Composite Division, or 'Jackson's Force', from its commander, Maj-Gen H.C. Jackson. On 24 June Jackson's Force was ordered to go back into the line to relieve a French division on the night of 28/29 June. However, this was cancelled, and instead the force entrained to return to the British sector.

25th Composite Bde was broken up at Huppy on 7 July. By then, the rest of 25th Division had been reduced to training cadres (TCs) and sent back to the UK to train reinforcements. 4th South Staffs was also reduced to a TC on 11 July, the surplus personnel being drafted elsewhere.

The TC of the 4th South Staffs joined 116th Bde in 39th Division at Étaples on 16 August. By now 39th Division consisted solely of TCs and was running training courses for newly arrived US Army divisions before they went into the line. On 1 November 1918 39th Division was ordered to begin demobilising the TCs, and the cadre of the 4th South Staffs completed demobilisation on 6 November, just before the Armistice with Germany.

=== 10th (Reserve) Battalion ===
After Lord Kitchener issued his call for volunteers in August 1914, the battalions of the 1st, 2nd and 3rd New Armies ('K1', 'K2' and 'K3' of 'Kitchener's Army') were quickly formed at the regimental depots. The SR battalions also swelled with new recruits and were soon well above their establishment strength. On 8 October 1914 each SR battalion was ordered to use the surplus to form a service battalion of the 4th New Army ('K4'). Accordingly, the 3rd (Reserve) Bn at Plymouth formed the 10th (Service) Bn of the South Staffs. It trained for active service as part of 99th Brigade in 33rd Division. On 10 April 1915 the War Office decided to convert the K4 battalions into 2nd Reserve units, providing drafts for the K1–K3 battalions in the same way that the SR was doing for the Regular battalions. The 10th Bn became 10th (Reserve) Battalion and the following month it moved to Colchester in 2nd Reserve Brigade, where it trained drafts for the 7th, 8th and 9th (Service) Bns of the South Staffs. In May 1915 it move to Harrogate, and then in November to Rugeley Camp on Cannock Chase in Staffordshire. On 1 September 1916 the 2nd Reserve battalions were transferred to the Training Reserve (TR) and 10th (R) Bn was broken up among the other TR battalions of 2nd Reserve Bde at Rugeley.

=== 11th (Reserve) Battalion ===
Similarly, 4th (Extra Reserve) Bn formed 11th (Service) Bn in Jersey in October 1914. It was not allotted to a formation. On 10 April 1915 it became 11th (Reserve) Bn and joined the 10th in 2nd Reserve Bde, first at Harrogate, and then at Rugeley. On 1 September 1916 it transferred to the TR as 9th Training Reserve Bn, still at Rugeley in 2nd Reserve Bde. The training staff retained their South Staffs badges. On 1 September 1917 it was redesignated 277th (Infantry) Bn, TR', and on 24 September it joined 200th Bde in 67th Division at Canterbury, Kent. There, on 24 October, it was transferred to the West Yorkshire Regiment as 52nd (Graduated) Bn. In February 1918 it moved to 207th Bde in 69th Division at Clipstone Camp in Nottinghamshire. By May 1918 it was at Thoresby, returning to Clipstone in the autumn. After the war ended it was converted into a service battalion on 8 February 1919 and was sent to the British Army of the Rhine, where it was disbanded on 7 April 1919.

=== Postwar ===
The SR resumed its old title of Militia in 1921 but like most militia battalions the 3rd and 4th South Staffs remained in abeyance after World War I. By the outbreak of World War II in 1939, the only officer remaining listed for either battalion was the Honorary Colonel of the 3rd, Lt-Col Swinfen-Broun. The Militia was formally disbanded in April 1953.

== Heritage and ceremonial ==
=== Honorary Colonels ===
The following served as Honorary Colonel of the regiment or its battalions:

3rd and 4th Battalions

- Sir Wellington Chetwynd-Talbot, KCB, former CO, appointed 26 April 1873, died 23 September 1898
- Charles, 8th Earl of Aylesford, former Major, 3rd Bn, appointed 4 February 1899, continued with 4th Bn, reappointed to Special Reserve 2 August 1908

3rd Battalion

- Lt-Col Michael Swinfen-Broun, former CO, appointed 5 April 1905, reappointed to Special Reserve 14 June 1908

=== Precedence ===
In the early days militia regiments serving together drew lots for their relative precedence. From 1778 the counties were given an order of precedence determined by ballot each year; for Staffordshire the positions drawn were:

- 40th on 1 June 1778
- 31st on 12 May 1779
- 23rd on 6 May 1780
- 19th on 28 April 1781
- 10th on 7 May 1782

However, when the militia were re-embodied in 1793, the order of precedence balloted for that year (when Staffordshire was 27th) remained in force throughout the French Revolutionary War: this covered all the regiments formed in the county. Another ballot for precedence took place at the start of the Napoleonic War, when Staffordshire was 2nd. This list continued until 1833. In that year the King drew the lots for individual regiments: those raised before the peace of 1763 took the first 47 places, followed by the regiments raised between 1763 and 1783, with the Staffordshires at 66th. This resulting list remained in force with minor amendments until the end of the militia. In line with most other regiments the Staffordshires paid little attention to the additional number.

=== Uniforms and insignia ===
The 1777 uniform of the Staffordshire Militia was red with light lemon yellow facings, and silver lace and buttons for the officers. By 1800 it wore its button lace loops in pairs and about 1803 the officer's lace and buttons changed to gilt. Its badge was the Stafford knot common to all regiments of the county. The drummers wore uniforms in 'reversed colours', ie yellow with red facings; the black percussionists employed by the regimental band wore turbans. When the regiment became the King's Own in 1805 it adopted the dark blue facings appropriate for a royal regiment. Its officers were also authorised to wear an image of the Round Tower of Windsor Castle on their accoutrements. The post-1805 officers' belt plate had the knot within a garter, with a crown above and a scroll inscribed 'KINGS OWN' below. The plate on the officers' 1812 pattern shakoes had the Royal cypher with a crown above and the knot below.

When the 1st Regiment joined the South Staffordshires, it adopted the badges and uniform of that regiment, including its white facings.

=== Battle honours ===
The King's Own (1st Staffordshire) Militia was awarded the Battle honour Mediterranean for its service during the Crimean War; this was later carried by both the 3rd and 4th Battalions. The 3rd and 4th were later awarded South Africa 1901–02 and South Africa 1900–01 respectively. However, after Army Order 251 of 1910, Special Reserve units carried the same battle honours as their parent regiment.

== See also ==
- Staffordshire Militia
- King's Own (2nd Staffordshire) Light Infantry Militia
- King's Own (3rd Staffordshire) Rifle Militia
- South Staffordshire Regiment
