= King's Own (3rd Staffordshire) Rifle Militia =

Auxiliary unit of the British Army

King's Own (3rd Staffordshire) Rifle Militia 4th Bn, North Staffordshire Regiment
- Active: 5 April 1853 – 1 April 1953
- Country: United Kingdom
- Branch: Militia/Special Reserve
- Role: Infantry
- Size: Battalion
- Garrison/HQ: Newcastle-under-Lyme; Whittington Barracks, Lichfield
- Engagements: Second Boer War; World War I; First Battle of Bapaume; Fifth Battle of Ypres; Crossing of the Scheldt

The King's Own (3rd Staffordshire) Rifle Militia, later the 4th Battalion, North Staffordshire Regiment was an auxiliary (Note: It is incorrect to describe the British Militia as 'irregular': throughout their history they were equipped and trained exactly like the line regiments of the regular army, and once embodied in time of war they were fulltime professional soldiers for the duration of their enlistment.) regiment raised in Staffordshire in the West Midlands of England in 1853. Under the Cardwell and Childers Reforms it became part of the North Staffordshire Regiment and saw active service during the Second Boer War. During World War I it trained reinforcements for the battalions serving overseas before proceeding to the Western Front itself and seeing a considerable amount of combat during the last year of the war. After a shadowy postwar existence it was formally disbanded in 1953.

== Background ==
The universal obligation to military service in the shire levy was long established in England and its legal basis was updated by the Military Service Act 1557 (4 & 5 Ph. & M. c. 2) and the Military Service (No. 2) Act 1557 (4 & 5 Ph. & M. c. 3), which placed selected men, the 'trained bands', under the command of Lords Lieutenant appointed by the monarch. This is seen as the starting date for the organised county militia in England. The Staffordshire Trained Bands saw some active service during the English Civil War. The Militia was re-established in 1662 after the Restoration of the Monarchy, and was popularly seen as the 'Constitutional Force' in contrast to the 'Standing Army' that was tainted by association with the New Model Army that had supported the military dictatorship of The Protectorate. However, the militia declined in the years after the Peace of Utrecht in 1713. Under threat of French invasion during the Seven Years' War a series of Militia Acts from 1757 reinvigorated county militia regiments, the men being conscripted by means of parish ballots (paid substitutes were permitted) to serve for three years. There was a property qualification for officers, who were commissioned by the Lord Lieutenant. The Midland counties further from the threat of invasion were generally apathetic: Staffordshire was given a quota of 560 men to raise, but the county leaders failed to do so, and paid a fine instead.

It was not until the War of American Independence, when Britain was threatened with invasion by the Americans' allies, France and Spain, that the Staffordshire Militia was reformed on 7 February 1777. It served until 1783 and was called out again at the beginning of the French Revolutionary War. Additional quotas (the Supplementary Militia) were called up in 1797 – Staffordshire's quota rose to 2,095 men – and the following year the 2nd and 3rd Staffordshire Militia were formed from these men. In 1799 there was a recruiting drive to get militiamen to volunteer for the Regular Army. The colonel of the 2nd Staffordshire Militia, Lord Granville Leveson-Gower, offered to raise a regiment for foreign service and soon obtained 300 recruits from the three Staffordshire regiments; however, King George III objected and the plan was scrapped. The following year the militia quotas were reduced, the 2nd and 3rd Staffordshires were disbanded and their remaining men incorporated into the 1st Regiment. After the Peace of Amiens broke down in 1803, the militia were embodied once more. After several periods of duty guarding the royal residences, George III commanded in 1805 that the 1st Staffordshire Militia should become the King's Own Staffordshire Militia. The King's Own served until the end of the Napoleonic Wars.

=== 1852 Reforms ===
After the Battle of Waterloo there was another long peace. Although officers continued to be commissioned into the militia and ballots were still held until they were suspended by the Militia Act 1829, the regiments were rarely assembled for training and the permanent staffs of sergeants and drummers (who were occasionally used to maintain public order) were progressively reduced. The Militia of the United Kingdom was revived by the Militia Act 1852, enacted during a renewed period of international tension. As before, units were raised and administered on a county basis, and filled by voluntary enlistment (although conscription by means of the Militia Ballot might be used if the counties failed to meet their quotas). Training was for 56 days on enlistment, then for 21–28 days per year, during which the men received full army pay. Under the act, Militia units could be embodied by royal proclamation for full-time home defence service in three circumstances:

1. 'Whenever a state of war exists between Her Majesty and any foreign power'.
2. 'In all cases of invasion or upon imminent danger thereof'.
3. 'In all cases of rebellion or insurrection'.

== King's Own (3rd Staffordshire) Rifles ==
Under the Militia Act 1852, two new militia regiments of were raised in Staffordshire in 1853, the King's Own (2nd Staffordshire) Light Infantry Militia and the King's Own (3rd Staffordshire) Rifle Militia; (Note: At other times it was referred to in official documents as 'The (King's Own) 3rd Staffordshire (Rifle) Militia', or the 'Rifle Regiment of the King's Own Staffordshire Militia'.) the original regiment was redesignated the King's Own (1st Staffordshire) Militia. The new 3rd Regiment was raised on 5 April 1853 at Lichfield, and gained its Rifle designation in June. The new regiment established its headquarters (HQ) at Newcastle-under-Lyme; the Lieutenant-Colonel Commandant was Charles Bagot, formerly of the Grenadier Guards. When the list of militia precedence (originally assigned by lot) was revised in 1855, the 3rd Staffordshires received the number 78th; in line with most other militia regiments the Staffordshires paid little attention to the additional number.

=== Crimean War and after ===
War having broken out with Russia in March 1854 and an expeditionary force sent to the Crimea, the militia were called out for home defence. The 3rd Staffords were embodied for full-time service from 19 December 1854 to 26 May 1856. Colonel Bagot retired in 1858 and became the regiment's Honorary Colonel; the senior Major, Richard Byrd Levett, previously a captain in the 60th Rifles took over as Lt-Col Commandant, followed in turn by Charles Coyney and then Peter Broughton (formerly of the 3rd Dragoon Guards) over the next few years.

After the Crimean War the regiment carried out the usual round of annual training. In 1870 all three Staffordshire Militia regiments took part in a field day on Stafford Common. The Militia Reserve introduced in 1867 consisted of present and former militiamen who undertook to serve overseas in case of war.

=== Cardwell reforms ===
Under the 'Localisation of the Forces' scheme introduced by the Cardwell Reforms of 1872, militia regiments were brigaded with their local regular and Volunteer battalions – for the King's Own (3rd Staffordshire) Militia this was with the 64th (2nd Staffordshire) Regiment of Foot, the 98th (The Prince of Wales's) Regiment of Foot and the King's Own (2nd Staffordshire) Militia in Sub-District No 20 (County of Stafford). The Militia now came under the War Office rather than their county lords lieutenant. Whittington Barracks was completed on Whittington Heath outside Lichfield in 1881 as a combined depot for the north and south Staffordshire brigades.

Although often referred to as brigades, the sub-districts were purely administrative organisations, but in a continuation of the Cardwell Reforms a mobilisation scheme began to appear in the Army List from December 1875. This assigned regular and militia units to places in an order of battle of corps, divisions and brigades for the 'Active Army', even though these formations were entirely theoretical, with no staff or services assigned. The 1st, 2nd and 3rd Staffordshire Militia formed 2nd Brigade of 2nd Division, VI Corps. The brigade would have mustered at Liverpool in time of war.

== 4th Battalion, North Staffordshire Regiment ==
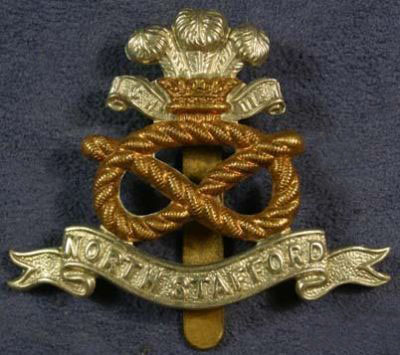
Cap badge of the North Staffordshire Regiment, showing the Stafford knot surmounted by the Prince of Wales's feathers.

The Childers Reforms of 1881 took Cardwell's reforms further, with the linked regular regiments becoming two-battalion regiments and the militia formally joining them. On 1 July the 64th and 98th Foot became the 1st and 2nd Battalions of the Prince of Wales's (North Staffordshire Regiment) (the 'North Staffs') and the King's Own (3rd Staffordshire) Rifle Militia became the 4th Battalion (the 2nd Staffordshire Militia became the 3rd Bn). Militia battalions now had a large cadre of permanent staff (about 30). Around a third of the recruits and many young officers went on to join the Regular Army. It was not uncommon for Militia officers to be attached to Regular forces for a particular service: Lt-Col Charles Bill served with the staff on the Burma Expedition of 1886; he became commanding officer (CO) of the battalion on 29 May 1893.

Although Cardwell's army corps scheme had been abandoned, the Stanhope Memorandum of 1888 proposed that the home defence army should consist of three corps, of which the first two would be regular, and the bulk of the third would be militia, while the rest of the militia and the volunteers would be assigned to fixed defences round London and the seaports.

=== Second Boer War ===
After the disasters of Black Week at the start of the Second Boer War in December 1899, most of the regular army was sent to South Africa, and many militia units were embodied to replace them for home defence and some overseas garrisons. The 4th North Staffs was embodied on 24 January 1900 and volunteered for service in South Africa. It embarked with a strength of 24 officers and 546 other ranks (ORs) under the command of Lt-Col Richard Mirehouse, (Note: Richard Mirehouse, formerly Levett, of Milford Hall.) and disembarked at Cape Town on 29 March.

At first the battalion was stationed at Green Point, Cape Town. On 31 March two companies sailed to St Helena guarding General Piet Cronjé and other Boer prisoners captured at the Battle of Paardeberg who were interned on the island. The companies returned after completing this duty. From June several companies were moved inland to guard various places, with HQ moving to Fraserburg in December. The battalion was commanded by Lt-Col Twemlow while Col Mirehouse was commandant at Beaufort West. On 25 June 1901 a determined attack was made on Fraserburg by the combined Commandos of Malan, Smit and Reitz totalling about 400 men. At the time the town was garrisoned by 85 North Staffs, with a few men of the town guards and the Cape Colony Cyclist Corps. Firing began at 05.30, when all the troops were standing-to The first attack was made on a small post held by a Corporal and three men, eventually working round behind a sangar on a high ridge of kopjes dominating the town, which was held by Sergeant White and 17 men, the Boers taking advantage of an unfinished blockhouse nearby. After three hours' fighting the post was rushed and captured by superior numbers. The remaining post on the ridge was also taken, the three men being captured. Captain Hawkshaw in Flagstaff Sangar refused a call to surrender, even though it was under fire from the commanding ridge. Although the Boers rode through the town, and Cape rebels were firing from the rooftops, Flagstaff and Tower Hill sangars held out, as did another held by the Town Guard, who also defended the prison. Firing died down at 18.00 when a relief force arrived; the North Staffs had lost 12 men killed and wounded.

In February 1902 the battalion took over the 80 miles (130 km) blockhouse line from Victoria Road to Carnarvon, the blockhouses being manned alternately by the North Staffs and by 'Cape Boys'. On 13 May the battalion entrained for Cape Town, where it embarked for home. It was disembodied on 11 June 1902, having lost 3 officers and 25 ORs killed or died of disease. All the participants received the Queen's South Africa Medal with the 'Cape Colony' clasp, and the King's South Africa Medal with clasps for 'South Africa 1901' and 'South Africa 1902'.

== Special Reserve ==
After the Boer War, the future of the militia was called into question. There were moves to reform the Auxiliary Forces (Militia, Yeomanry and Volunteers) to take their place in the six army corps proposed by the Secretary of State for War, St John Brodrick. However, little of Brodrick's scheme was carried out. Under the more sweeping Haldane Reforms of 1908, the Militia was replaced by the Special Reserve (SR), a semi-professional force whose role was to provide reinforcement drafts for regular units serving overseas in wartime, rather like the earlier Militia Reserve. The battalion became the 4th (Extra Reserve) Battalion, North Staffordshire Regiment, on 30 August 1908.

== World War I ==
=== 4th (Extra Reserve) Battalion ===
The 4th Bn was embodied at Whittington Barracks on the outbreak of World War I on 4 August 1914 under the command of Lt-Col T. Way, a retired Regular captain who had been commanding officer since 30 August 1912. The battalion went to its war station on Guernsey. While there it formed the 11th (Reserve) Battalion, North Staffs, to provide reinforcements for Kitchener's Army units (see below). In September 1916 the battalion moved to Marske-by-the-Sea near Redcar on the North Yorkshire coast. Here it formed part of a composite infantry brigade with 4th (Extra Reserve) Battalion, South Staffordshire Regiment (originally the 1st Staffordshire Militia). In June 1917 these two Staffordshire SR battalions joined 67th (2nd Home Counties) Division in Kent, replacing two 3rd Line Territorial Force (TF) battalions that had seen sent to join the British Expeditionary Force (BEF) on the Western Front. 4th North Staffs joined 200th (2/1st Surrey) Brigade.

67th Division had spent the war so far preparing drafts of reinforcements for 1st Line TF units overseas. In April 1917 it had been ordered to prepare for service with the BEF, but the move never happened. In the end the Staffordshire SR battalions proceeded to France individually. The 4th North Staffs was thus one of the few SR units (mainly 'Extra Reserve' battalions) actually to see overseas service in World War I, possibly because the 2nd Bn North Staffords spent the whole war in India and did not require many reinforcements, while the 3rd (Reserve) Bn could supply enough for the 1st Bn.

==== Ypres Salient ====
35th Division's formation sign

4th North Staffords left Canterbury for Southampton on 6 October and disembarked at Le Havre on 8 October. It travelled by train to Bapaume and was attached to 56th (1/1st London) Division for training. On 13 October the four companies were attached to battalions of 167th, 168th and 169th Brigades for initiation in trench warfare and suffered their first casualties. The battalion reassembled at Fremicourt on 18 October before a second tour of trench duty by companies 22–28 October. It went into the line as a battalion 1–6 November. It then left Fremicourt on 9 November by bus and moved north to the Ypres Salient. On 15 November it became part of 106th Brigade in 35th Division. This was a 'Kitchener' Division raised early in the war from Bantams (fit men below the minimum regulation height), but the supply of suitable men ran out and after the Battle of the Somme the division was sent unfit undersized recruits who had to be rejected. The division was brought back to strength by converted cavalrymen, but the supply of reinforcements remained a problem. When 4th North Staffs under Lt-Col W. Appleyard joined, the division had just come out of the Battle of Passchendaele and had suffered heavy casualties. It was then holding the Poelcapelle sector and the battalion took up a support position partly on the canal bank east of Brielen, and partly at 'Kempton Park'.

December was a quiet month, but on 7 December the Germans mounted a pre-dawn trench raid on a post on the right flank of 4th North Staffs. The defenders' rapid fire dispersed the attack and the sergeant in charge led a pursuit and took some prisoners. Life in the Salient was tough, improving defences was hard work in frozen mud, and the troops had to be regularly rotated, each relief entailing a long march along duckboard tracks. 4th North Staffs drove off another German dawn raid on 26 January 1918.

Because of the severe manpower shortage being suffered by the BEF, infantry brigades were reduced to three battalions, and in the resulting reorganisation 4th North Staffs was transferred on 3 February 1918 within 35th Division to 105th Bde, with which it remained for the rest of the war. On 28 February, 105th Bde carried out four simultaneous raids, with 4th North Staffs proving two 40-strong parties to raid points east of 'Colombo House'. The raids went in at 20.00, supported by CLVII (Aberdeen) Brigade, Royal Field Artillery, of 35th Divisional Artillery and CLXI (Yorkshire) Bde, RFA, of 32nd Division. The first North Staffs' raid advanced under machine gun fire about 550 yards (500 m) along a road, unable to deploy off it in the 'wretched' conditions. They found the objective, a group of 'elephant iron' shelters, virtually demolished by the artillery, and retired with a prisoner. The other raid assembled at Colombo House and advanced about 500 yards (460 m) along the forest road, over a succession of felled trees and Concertina wire. It fired on several retiring Germans and returned on time.

==== Operation Michael ====
On 9 March 1918, 35th Division became part of GHQ Reserve, with 105th Bde in camps around Eykhoek and Crombeke. When the German Spring Offensive (Operation Michael) opened on 21 March, the division was ordered to move south. 105th Brigade entrained at Roesbrugge on 23 March, beginning to arrive at Méricourt-l'Abbé, south west of Amiens, that evening. After they detrained, the battalions marched through the night to relieve the hard-pressed 21st Division. 4th North Staffs was one of the last to arrive, not detraining until 12.00 on 24 March. That evening it sent two companies forward to reinforce 15th Sherwood Foresters, who had already made a counter-attack at Maurepas and then resisted several heavy German attacks.

The Germans renewed their attack on 25 March (the First Battle of Bapaume) with a heavy barrage all along the line, and managed to push into Maricourt Wood, threatening 105th Bde's left flank. Brigadier-General A.H. Marindin and his staff organised a group of stragglers, and led them together with two companies of 4th North Staffs to clear the wood. After this counter-attack, 4th North Staffs held an old trench line east of Maricourt village, but its left flank was still very exposed. The situation elsewhere was critical, and that night 35th Division was ordered to pull back to the Albert–Bray-sur-Somme road. The orders reached 105th Bde at 22.00 and despite the confusion of straggling units that formed part of its line, it completed the move by 01.00 on 26 March.

The division was then ordered to prepare for retirement across the River Ancre, but to delay as long as possible to allow the artillery and stores to cross first. One attack had been driven off when the retirement began at 14.00; 105th Bde passed through the rearguard at Morlancourt at 16.00 and were across the river by 18.00. But Third Army HQ tried to countermand the retirement, and soon after 19.00 the tired 105th Bde began recrossing the Ancre to regain the high ground beyond Morlancourt. The 4th North Staffs (commanded by Capt Bache after Lt-Col Appleyard had been evacuated with gas poisoning) advanced on the left of the brigade via Dernancourt, supported by two companies of 15th Cheshire Regiment. The Brigadier had complained that the attack by tired men, short of ammunition, had little chance of success; he was allowed to call it off, but the two officers sent forward to recall 4th North Staffs were never seen again. The battalion reached the outskirts of Morlancourt, where the Germans were digging in, but finding itself isolated it took up defensive positions. Once the battalion got word of the cancellation it extricated itself from this dangerous position, but it was not until 01.30 on 27 March that it was safely back across the river.

The division then prepared to defend the line of the Ancre, with the 4th North Staffs along the railway embankment behind Dernancourt, outposts along the riverbank and standing posts on the far side. On 27 March the Germans advanced against Dernancourt, but were broken up by fire from the artillery and the outposts along the river. That afternoon 105th Bde was relieved and went into reserve, though 4th North Staffs continued to provide patrols to cross the river. The whole division was relieved on 30 March. After the confusion over the retirement orders the divisional commander had been removed and Brig-Gen Marindin was temporarily commanding; Lt-Col Appleyard took over 105th Bde when he returned from hospital on 31 March.

==== Summer 1918 ====
On the night of 6/7 April, 35th Division marched south through the rain to occupy the front line trenches in Aveluy Wood, which it held for the next two months. The command of 105th Bde was taken over by Brig-Gen Adrian Carton de Wiart, VC, though he was wounded two weeks later. 4th North Staffs was in reserve during a British attack on 22 April 1918, otherwise the period was quiet. In early May the infantry were relieved in the front line and were used to construct the 'Purple Line' in the rear. They returned to the front on 12 May and 4th North Staffs resumed its active raiding. From 27 May the shelling on both sides became worse, and part of 35th Division made an attack on 1 June; a second attack, by 105th Bde on 5 June, was called off at the last minute. The division began to be relieved, 105th Bde marching on 16 June to Puchevillers to rest until the end of the month. On 30 June the division entrained for the north, taking over the line around Mont Kemmel, which had recently been fought over and was still under shellfire. The division resumed active raiding before going into reserve on 9 August.

==== Hundred Days Offensive ====
Further south the Allied Hundred Days Offensive had been launched on 8 August, and by the end of the month there were signs that the Germans were pulling back. A proposed relief by 105th Bde on the night of 29/30 August was cancelled when the Germans were found to have abandoned Bailleul. Instead, on 4 September the brigade relieved some US troops who had been holding the line around Vlamertinge, the 4th North Staffs suffering numerous casualties from gas shelling while this was carried out. The German defence now relied upon artillery: by 15 September, patrols had found that the actual defence line was 1,000 yards (910 m) away, so the whole division advanced, with 4th North Staffs forming the right flank, meeting virtually no opposition.

The units now began taking up their positions for the next phase of the Allied offensive on 28 September (the Fifth Battle of Ypres. The attack was launched before dawn and despite the bad ground it went without a hitch, the Germans being taken by surprise. All three brigades were on their intermediate objective by 08.30, where 105th Bde halted to allow the others to continue. Next day 105th Bde passed through to resume the attack, but things did not go so well: the leading battalion lost its way in the wasteland that had been fought over so many times before, and the brigade found itself attacking Zandvoorde from the west instead of the north-west, and was met by heavy machine gun fire from the ruins. A Creeping barrage called down from the artillery failed to disturb the dug-in machine gunners, so 4th North Staffs and 15th Sherwood Foresters were ordered to envelop the village from both sides. 4th North Staffs advanced towards Blegnaerts Farm and the turning movement succeeded, but it had taken all day to capture the village.

Other units took over the lead over the following days, and on 17 October the division closed up to the River Lys. 105th Bde was in reserve when the Lys was bridged and crossed (the Battle of Courtrai), and on the morning of 19 October it passed through and took up positions south of Courtrai. 35th Division renewed its advance on 20 October, 105th Bde advancing on the left with all three battalions in line. There was no barrage, but each battalion had a section of field guns attached to it and the troops were ordered to advance as in open warfare. They moved off at 04.45 and the attack began at 06.15. 4th North Staffs on the extreme left had the toughest opposition: even while deploying they were fired on by machine guns from in front and to the left. While the rest of the division tackled the villages and converged on Zwevegem, 4th North Staffs reached the Bossuit–Kortrijk Canal and captured some howitzers. It then pushed on towards its objective, Pont Levis 2 on the canal, which it finally reached at 22.00 that night. Next day another division passed through, but 4th North Staffs remained in the mud and wet of the battle zone for another day before being relieved. However they were welcomed by the people of the liberated city of Courtrai.

35th Division returned to the front on the night of 26/27 October and attacked along the River Scheldt at Tiegem on 31 October with heavy artillery support and smokescreens to neutralise the enemy batteries and machine guns on the high ground across the river. 105th Brigade was in support for this successful attack. It then went into rest billets at Marcke while the engineers prepared for an assault crossing of the Scheldt. The attack was scheduled for 11 November, but during the night of 8/9 November the Germans pulled back from the river and 105th Bde was ordered to scramble across using any means possible. The brigade crossed by ferries and temporary bridges, then 104th Bde passed through to continue the pursuit eastwards. By the end of 10 November the battalions of 105th Bde were round Kwaremont. Next morning came word that the Armistice with Germany would come into force at 11.00, and the division was ordered to make every effort to reach the River Dendre by then. 105th Brigade was at Audenhove when hostilities ended.

On 13 November, 35th Division began a march back to billets in the St Omer area, arriving on 2 December. It spent the winter there until the end of January 1919, when trouble broke out among the troops awaiting demobilisation at camps round Calais. The division was sent to restore order, and 105th Bde remained there for a month. The infantry of 35th Division embarked for home about 19 April, and 4th Bn North Staffordshire Regiment was disembodied on 28 April 1919. While with 35th Division, the battalion had suffered casualties of 6 officers and 103 ORs killed, 30 officers and 742 ORs wounded, and 1 officer and 112 men missing, to add to the 3 ORs killed, 6 ORs wounded and 1 officer missing while serving with 56th (1st London) Division.

=== 11th (Reserve) Battalion ===
After Lord Kitchener issued his call for volunteers in August 1914, the battalions of the 1st, 2nd and 3rd New Armies ('K1', 'K2' and 'K3' of 'Kitchener's Army') were quickly formed at the regimental depots. The SR battalions also swelled with new recruits and were soon well above their establishment strength. On 8 October 1914 each SR battalion was ordered to use the surplus to form a service battalion of the 4th New Army ('K4'). Accordingly, the 4th (Extra Reserve) Bn at Guernsey formed the 11th (Service) Bn of the North Staffs. In February 1915 it moved to Alderney. On 10 April 1915 the War Office decided to convert the K4 battalions into 2nd Reserve units, providing drafts for the K1–K3 battalions in the same way that the SR was doing for the Regular battalions. The 11th Bn became 11th (Reserve) Battalion in 1st Reserve Brigade and in June 1915 it moved to Darlington, and then in September to Rugeley Camp on Cannock Chase in Staffordshire, where it trained drafts for the 7th, 8th and 9th (Service) Bns of the North Staffs. On 1 September 1916 the 2nd Reserve battalions were transferred to the Training Reserve and the battalion became 4th Training Reserve Bn, still at Rugeley in 1st Reserve Bde. The training staff retained their North Staffs badges.On 1 September 1917 it was redesignated 258th (Infantry) Bn, Training Reserve', and on 24 September it joined 215th Bde in 72nd Division at Ipswich, Suffolk. There, on 27 October, it was transferred to the Durham Light Infantry as 51st (Graduated) Bn. On 15 January 1918 it moved to 206th Bde in 69th Division at Durham. By June 1918 it was at Guisborough, and in the autumn at Catterick where it remained for the rest of the war. After the war ended it was converted into a service battalion on 8 February 1919 before being disbanded later in the year.

=== Postwar ===
The SR resumed its old title of Militia in 1921 but like most militia battalions the 4th North Staffs remained in abeyance after World War I. By the outbreak of World War II in 1939, there were no officers listed for the battalion. The Militia was formally disbanded in April 1953.

== Heritage and ceremonial ==
=== Honorary Colonels ===
The following served as Honorary Colonel of the regiment:

- Charles Bagot, former CO, appointed 25 March 1858, died 25 February 1881
- Hamar Bass, MP, first commissioned into the regiment 15 June 1860, later CO, appointed 8 July 1893, died 8 April 1898
- Charles Bill, MP, first commissioned into the regiment 6 April 1863, later CO, appointed 3 December 1898, continued with the Special Reserve battalion, died 9 December 1915

=== Uniforms and insignia ===
The uniform of the King's Own (3rd Staffordshire) Militia, as befitted a Rifle regiment, was Rifle green, with the scarlet facings denoting a royal regiment (similar to the King's Royal Rifle Corps). Its badge was the Stafford knot displayed within the curl of a French bugle-horn. When the regiment joined the North Staffordshires in 1881, it adopted the badges and uniform of that regiment, red with white facings.

=== Battle honours ===
The 4th Battalion was awarded the Battle honour South Africa 1900–02. After Army Order 251 of 1910, Special Reserve units carried the same battle honours as their parent regiment.

== See also ==
- Staffordshire Militia
- King's Own (1st Staffordshire) Militia
- King's Own (2nd Staffordshire) Light Infantry Militia
- North Staffordshire Regiment
