= Mediterranean (battle honour) =

Battle honour of the British Army

Mediterranean was a battle honour awarded to the following Militia battalions of the British Army for their service during the Crimean War of 1854–56, when they volunteered for garrison duty and relieved the regular battalions of their respective regiments for active service:

- 49th, or East Kent Militia (later 3rd Battalion, the Buffs)
- 55th, or Royal Westminster, or 3rd Middlesex Militia (later 5th Battalion, the Royal Fusiliers)
- 66th, or King's Own (1st Staffordshire) Militia (later 3rd Battalion, the South Staffordshire Regiment)
- 125th, or 3rd Royal Lancashire Militia (The Duke of Lancaster's Own) (later 3rd Battalion, the Loyal North Lancashire Regiment)
- 7th, or Royal Berkshire Militia (later 3rd Battalion, the Royal Berkshire Regiment)
- 45th, or 1st Royal Lancashire Militia (The Duke of Lancaster's Own) (later 3rd Battalion, the King's Own (Royal Lancaster Regiment))
- 21st, or 2nd West York Light Infantry (later 3rd Battalion, the West Yorkshire Regiment)
- 51st, or Oxfordshire Militia (later 4th Battalion, the Oxfordshire Light Infantry, and eventually the 3rd Battalion, Oxfordshire and Buckinghamshire Light Infantry)
- 48th, or Northampton Militia (later 3rd Battalion, the Northamptonshire Regiment)
- 33rd, or Royal Wiltshire Militia (later 3rd Battalion, the Wiltshire Regiment)

(The 35th, or Royal Buckinghamshire Militia (King's Own) (later 3rd Battalion, the Oxfordshire Light Infantry) was apparently ordered to the Ionian Islands in November–December 1855, but even if it actually set out the order was soon cancelled and it was stationed in England again in February 1856. It was not awarded the battle honour.)

This honour should not be confused with the honours Mediterranean 1900–1901, Mediterranean 1901 and Mediterranean 1901–02 which were awarded to militia battalions for service in the Second Boer War.

The honours awarded to militia battalions lapsed under Army Order 251 issued in October 1910 after they had transferred to the Special Reserve. This stated that battle honours awarded to former militia battalions were to cease to be borne: special reserve battalions would carry the same honours as the regular battalions of their regiments. They could continue to carry colours with the old honours "as a temporary measure" if they chose, but only until they were presented with replacement colours.
