= Michael Swinfen-Broun =

Michael Alexander Wilsone Swinfen-Broun JP
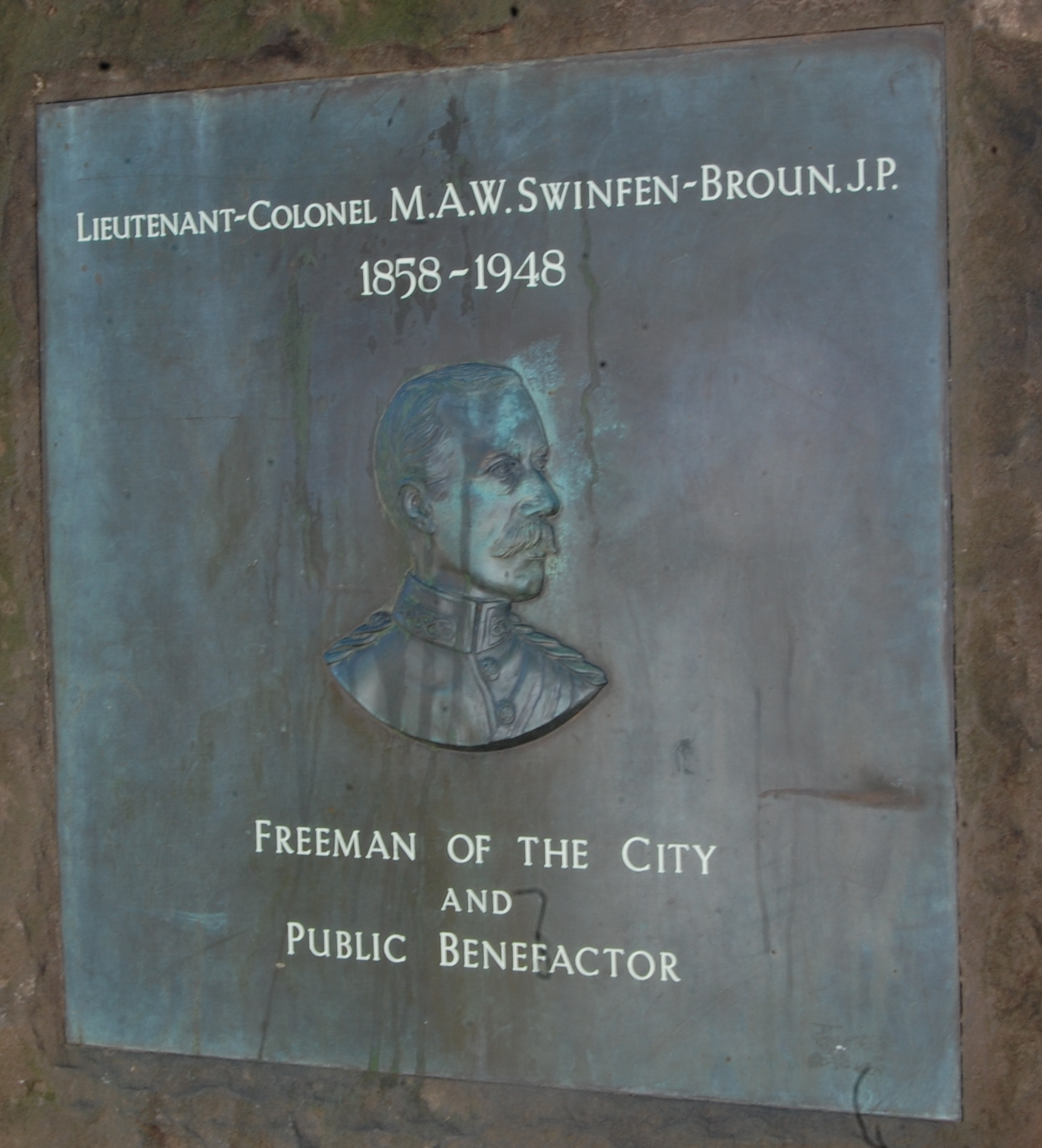
- The Beacon Park memorial plaque
- Born: 1858
- Died: 1948
- Monuments: In Beacon Park
- Occupations: Soldier; Magistrate; High Sheriff of Staffordshire; Deputy Lieutenant of Staffordshire
- Organization: South Staffordshire Regiment
- Known for: Philanthropy

Lieutenant-Colonel Michael Alexander Wilsone Swinfen-Broun JP (1858–1948) was a soldier, magistrate, High Sheriff and Deputy Lieutenant of Staffordshire, and benefactor of the city of Lichfield, England, where he lived at Swinfen Hall.

== Career ==
Swinfen-Broun joined the Militia in 1876, and was lieutenant-colonel in command of the 3rd (1st King's Own Staffordshire Militia) Battalion, South Staffordshire Regiment, from 3 December 1898. He was also granted the honorary rank of colonel. The battalion was embodied in May 1901, and the following month left for service in South Africa during the Second Boer War. Following the end of hostilities, Broun returned with most of the battalion in July 1902. He was mentioned in despatches for his services during the war, and on 5 April 1905 he was appointed Honorary Colonel of the 3rd Battalion, and was its only remaining officer on the outbreak of World War II in 1939.

He was High Sheriff of Staffordshire in 1907.

== Philanthropy ==
Among Swinfen-Broun's many acts of charity were donations to Lichfield's Victoria Hospital, where he was president of the management committee from 1913-27. He donated 12 acres of land that now forms part of the city's Beacon Park.

His bequests to Lichfield include the statues by Barcaglia (Donna Che Trattiene il Tempo, "The Woman who Tries to Arrest Time") and Benzoni (a work known locally as 'the reading girl'). In 2008, the former was sold at auction at Sotheby's in London for £150,000, as the council was unable to provide a home for it with suitable conditions to prevent its deterioration.

Swinfen Hall in 1900

He also bequeathed his family home, the 1757 Swinfen Hall, to the Church and City of Lichfield. Most of the land was sold off and the hall stood unoccupied for many years until acquired in 1987 by the present owners and converted to an hotel.

Other bequests included silver plate and sporting trophies to Lichfield City Council.

== Honours ==
Swinfen-Broun was elected freeman of the City and County of Lichfield in 1936.

== Memorials ==
He is commemorated by a memorial in Beacon Park, comprising two plaques on opposite sides of a block of sandstone, unveiled in 1972 by the then Mayor of Lichfield, Councillor W.J. Wilson J.P., who became the first chairman of The Swinfen Broun Charitable Trust.

His family coat of arms is depicted in stained glass on the side of Lichfield Guildhall.
