= 200th (2/1st Surrey) Brigade =

2nd Surrey Brigade 200th (2/1st Surrey) Brigade 200th Brigade
- Active: October 1914 – 12 February 1918
- Country: United Kingdom
- Branch: British Army
- Type: Infantry
- Size: Brigade
- Part of: 67th (2nd Home Counties) Division
- Service: World War I

The 2nd Surrey Brigade was a 2nd Line Territorial Force Brigade of the British Army in World War I. The brigade was formed as a duplicate of the Surrey Brigade in October 1914 as part of the 2nd Home Counties Division. As the name suggests, the brigade recruited in Surrey. In August 1915, in common with all Territorial Force brigades, it was numbered as 200th (2/1st Surrey) Brigade. Between September 1917 and the end of the year, the brigade was extensively reorganized and lost its territorial identity; henceforth it was known as 200th Brigade. It was demobilized in February 1918.

== History ==
In accordance with the Territorial and Reserve Forces Act 1907 (7 Edw.7, c.9) which brought the Territorial Force into being, the TF was intended to be a home defence force for service during wartime and members could not be compelled to serve outside the country. However, on the outbreak of war on 4 August 1914, many members volunteered for Imperial Service. Therefore, TF units were split into 1st Line (liable for overseas service) and 2nd Line (home service for those unable or unwilling to serve overseas) units. 2nd Line units performed the home defence role, although in fact most of these were also posted abroad in due course.

The Brigade served on home defence duties throughout the war, whilst recruiting, training and supplying drafts to overseas units and formations. It was twice warned to prepare to be transferred to Ireland, and in April 1917 for service on the Western Front, but in the event never left England. It was replaced in 67th (2nd Home Counties) Division by 214th Brigade on 12 February 1918 and the brigade was demobilized.

== Order of battle ==
The composition of 200th Brigade was as follows:

- 2/4th Battalion, Queen's (Royal West Surrey Regiment) – left 24 April 1915, later to Gallipoli
- 3/4th Battalion, Queen's (Royal West Surrey) Regiment – formed June 1915, left for Western Front May 1917
- 2/5th Battalion, Queen's (Royal West Surrey Regiment) – disbanded September 1917
- 2/5th Battalion, East Surrey Regiment – disbanded November 1917
- 2/6th Battalion, East Surrey Regiment – disbanded November 1917
- 4th (Extra Reserve) Battalion, North Staffordshire Regiment – joined June 1917, left for Western Front October 1917
- 200th Trench Mortar Battery – formed by June 1917
- 276th Graduated Battalion, became 52nd (Graduated) Battalion, Northumberland Fusiliers – joined 24 September 1917, left 5 March 1918
- 277th Graduated Battalion, became 52nd (Graduated) Battalion, West Yorkshire Regiment – joined 24 September 1917, left February 1918
- 278th Graduated Battalion, became 52nd (Graduated) Battalion, Sherwood Foresters – joined 24 September 1917, left February 1918
- 2/1st Battalion, Cambridgeshire Regiment – joined 8 October 1917, disbanded March 1918

== See also ==
- British infantry brigades of the First World War

== Bibliography ==
- Maj A.F. Becke,History of the Great War: Order of Battle of Divisions, Part 2b: The 2nd-Line Territorial Force Divisions (57th–69th), with the Home-Service Divisions (71st–73rd) and 74th and 75th Divisions, London: HM Stationery Office, 1937/Uckfield: Naval & Military Press, 2007, ISBN 1-847347-39-8.
- Brig E.A. James, British Regiments 1914–18, London: Samson Books, 1978/Uckfield: Naval & Military Press, 2001, ISBN 978-1-84342-197-9.
