= Stanhope Memorandum =

The Stanhope Memorandum was a document written by Edward Stanhope, the Secretary of State for War of the United Kingdom of Great Britain and Ireland, on 8 December 1888. It set out the overall strategic aims of the British Empire, and the way the British Army was to be employed towards these aims.

It gave the priorities of the Army, in order, as:

1. the support of the civil power in the United Kingdom
2. the provision of reinforcements for India
3. the provision of garrison units for fortresses, colonies and coaling stations
4. the provision of two corps for home defence
5. the ability to deploy one of these two corps for service in a European war
