= Special Reserve =

British Army reserve 1908–1919

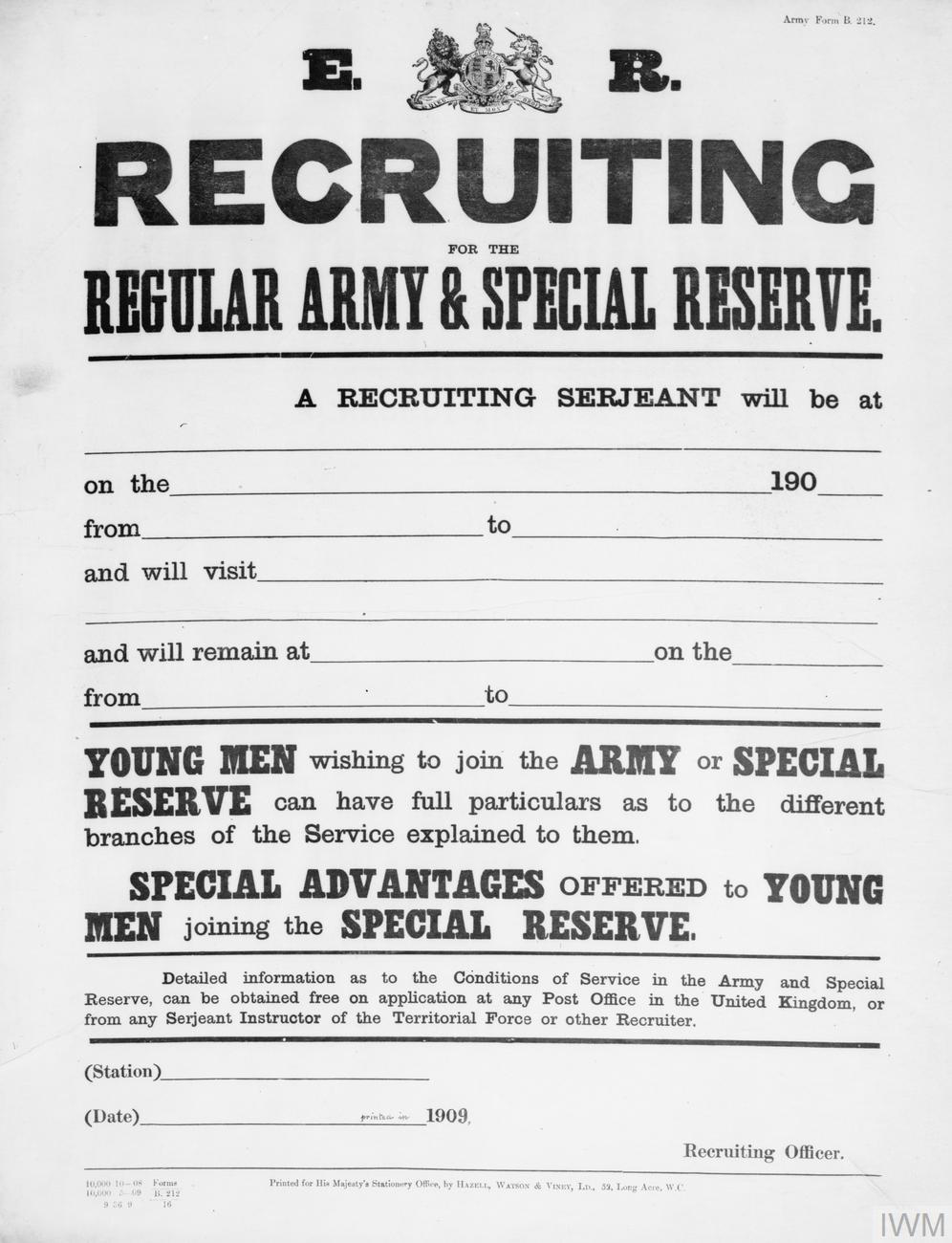
- Recruitment poster for the British Army and Special Reserve
- Active: 1908–1919
- Country: UKGBI
- Type: Army reserve

The Special Reserve was established on 1 April 1908 with the function of maintaining a reservoir of manpower for the British Army and training replacement drafts in times of war. Its formation was part of the military reforms implemented by Richard Haldane, the Secretary of State for War, which also created the Territorial Force. Haldane originally intended that the Militia would provide the reserve, but opposition from its representatives forced him to abolish it and create the Special Reserve instead. Only 60 per cent of the Militia transferred into the new reserve, and it was consistently under strength, particularly in officers. Reservists enlisted for a six-year term of service, and had to undergo six months of basic training on recruitment and three to four weeks training annually.

The Special Reserve was organised into battalions, providing the third (and sometimes fourth) for each of the regular army's 64 two-battalion infantry regiments and a fifth and sixth for the five four-battalion infantry regiments. In addition to providing replacements to the regular army, the Special Reserve was deployed on home defence duties guarding the coast and key installations during the First World War. The routine nature of its duties meant that scant attention was paid to it in regimental histories. After the war, the Special Reserve was abolished and the Militia was resurrected in 1921 to take on its former role. No effort was made to restart recruitment, and in 1924 the new Militia's functions were absorbed into the Supplementary Reserve.

== Background ==
Traditional mistrust of a standing army resulted in a strong tradition of part-time military institutions in England and later the United Kingdom. The oldest of these, the English Militia, traced its origins to the military obligations of the Anglo-Saxon period, and its formal existence can be dated back to the first militia statutes of 1558. Originally recruited by various means of compulsion, the British Militia had become a voluntary institution by the late 19th century, and over 950,000 men had served in its ranks between 1882 and 1904. The Militia was, alongside the Yeomanry and the Volunteer Force, designed to supplement the regular army in defending the country against invasion and insurrection, and the three auxiliary institutions were not liable for service overseas. Those militiamen who subsequently joined the Militia Reserve, a pool of individuals within the Militia, consequently accepted an overseas service liability. They were poorly organised, with inadequate equipment and training, and operated as discrete institutions integrated neither with each other nor the regular army.

To make the small, professional British Army better able to cope with the increasing commitments of defending the empire, a series of reforms were begun by Edward Cardwell in 1871 and completed by Hugh Childers in 1881. They were designed to foster the integration of auxiliary and professional by linking militia and volunteer battalions with regular army regiments, and provide the means by which army battalions abroad could be reinforced by linked battalions at home. (Note: As an example, the Gloucestershire Regiment was formed in 1881 by the amalgamation of the 28th (North Gloucestershire) and 61st (South Gloucestershire) Regiments of Foot, which became the new regiment's 1st and 2nd Battalions respectively. The county's two militia battalions, the Royal South Gloucestershire Militia and the Royal North Gloucestershire Militia, became the regiment's 3rd and 4th (Militia) Battalions, and the 1st (City of Bristol) Gloucestershire Rifle Volunteers and the 2nd Gloucestershire Rifle Volunteers became the regiment's 1st and 2nd Volunteer Battalions.) The reforms effectively ended the Militia's existence as an independent body capable of operating in independent units, and it became little more than a source of recruitment into the army, with 35 per cent of its men enlisting each year.

The reorganisation did little to ease the army's manpower problems, and as early as 1879, during the Anglo-Zulu War, there were just 59 regular home battalions supporting 82 abroad. The situation became untenable at the turn of the century when, during the Second Boer War, the strain placed on the army severely denuded Britain's home defences and forced the government to appeal for volunteers to augment the regular forces overseas. Nearly 46,000 militiamen served in South Africa, another 74,000 were enlisted into the army, and five battalions were deployed as garrison troops on Malta, St. Helena and in Egypt. Some 20,000 men of the Volunteer Force were transferred voluntarily into the army reserve and sent to South Africa, and the yeomanry provided the nucleus of the separate Imperial Yeomanry in which over 34,000 volunteered.

== Formation ==
The experience in South Africa prompted further debate about the abilities of the army to intervene in a major foreign conflict and of the auxiliaries, which were perceived to have performed poorly during the war, to support it. The reform efforts of the conservative Secretaries of State for War, William St John Brodrick and H. O. Arnold-Forster, foundered in the face of opposition from auxiliary interests in the government, but their successor, the liberal Richard Haldane fared better with his efforts. He improved the army's capability to fight in a major foreign conflict by creating a six-division Expeditionary Force, and the auxiliary forces were re-organised into the better trained, equipped and integrated Territorial Force. His reforms did not, however, escape vested interests unscathed, and he was forced to make some fundamental compromises before he could be sure of successfully passing the Territorial and Reserve Forces Act 1907 in Parliament. His plan to assign 31,000 of the Militia to the Expeditionary Force, allocate a further 56,000 as a reserve for it and transfer the remainder into the Territorial Force was met with opposition by militia representatives. Their intransigence forced Haldane to abolish the Militia altogether and create the Special Reserve as a separate institution to the Territorial Force, both of which were established on 1 April 1908.

There was opposition from Militia colonels, who would have preferred that the battalions deployed as a body, overseas, rather than drafts of personnel dispersed to line battalions, as had happened in the Boer War.

The infantry of the Special Reserve were integrated into the regular army's regimental system. Of the existing 124 Militia battalions 23 were disbanded. Of those remaining, 74 become Reserve Battalions and 27 Extra Reserve. Each of the 69 infantry regiments received a 3rd (Reserve) battalion (or, for regiments with four battalions, a 5th and 6th (Reserve) Battalion), and 23 regiments also established between them an additional 27 (Extra Reserve) battalions. (Note: Consequently, at the outbreak of the First World War in 1914 the Gloucestershire Regiment comprised: 1st Battalion – assigned to the 3rd Brigade in the 1st Division; 2nd Battalion – deployed to Tianjin, China; 3rd (Reserve) Battalion, Special Reserve – formerly 3rd (Militia) Battalion; 4th (City of Bristol) Battalion, Territorial Force – formerly 1st (City of Bristol) Volunteer Battalion; 5th Battalion, Territorial Force – formerly 2nd Volunteer Battalion; 6th Battalion, Territorial Force – formerly 3rd Volunteer Battalion)These Extra Reserve Battalions, who were to deploy as a unit, for home or active service, were hindered as recruiting was generally poor. The reserve battalions were to be 550 strong, increasing to 1,500 on mobilisation with the arrival of Army Reservists not immediately required by the Expeditionary Force. Each infantry regiment was to have ‘a Reserve battalion composed of Special Reservists’ primarily, its purpose was not to go to war as a unit, but to provide drafts to the regular battalions. It was also Haldane's intention that the Extra Reserve battalions would be available for garrison duties in the Mediterranean or line of communications duties in support of the Expeditionary Force, and ambiguous statements he made later suggested that Special Reserve battalions might also serve overseas. Reservists were volunteers at least 17 years old who committed to a six-year term of service, six months full time basic training on enlistment and three to four weeks training annually. Officers were recruited from a newly created Special Reserve of Officers, though Haldane also hoped that another of his innovations, the university-based Officers' Training Corps (OTC), would be a source of reserve officers. They were required to undergo twelve months of basic training, later reduced to six, and then attend an annual camp and other training schemes as required.

In contrast with the soldier serving in the militia, those who served under Special Reserve terms of service had an obligation to serve overseas, as stipulated in paragraph 54. The standards of medical fitness were lower than for recruits to the regular infantry. The possibility of enlisting in the army under Regular terms of service were facilitated under paragraph 38, one precondition was that the recruit 'fulfils the necessary physical requirements.'

A similar contrast was the replacement of several weeks of preliminary training with six months of full time training upon enlisting in the Special Reserve.

The two remaining militia units of the Royal Engineers, the Royal Monmouthshire Royal Engineers and the Royal Anglesey Royal Engineers, transferred to the Special Reserve.

In addition, three Imperial Yeomanry regiments (the North Irish Horse, South Irish Horse and King Edward's Horse (The King's Overseas Dominions Regiment)) created after the Boer War could not be incorporated into the Territorial Forces because the Act did not cover Ireland or the Dominions. These were transferred to the Special Reserve. It had been intended to convert the Royal Garrison Artillery Militia units into Royal Field Artillery brigades of the Special Reserve, but this was abandoned and the units disbanded in 1909. Instead the Special Reserve artillerymen would form Brigade Ammunition Columns for the Regular RFA brigades on the outbreak of war.

Some 35,000 former militiamen, representing about 60 per cent of the Militia, transferred into the Special Reserve. A further 20,000 new recruits were enlisted, though 6,100 of them joined the army before completing their initial six months' training and some 2,000 were quickly rejected on medical grounds. Many that did pass the medical were nevertheless in poor shape physically. The reserve failed to attract sufficient recruits, and it was consistently 16–18 per cent short of its 80,300 establishment. Because of the long training requirement, those it did attract tended to be the unemployed and the young, in many cases too young, with boys as young as 15 being accepted. The problem was particularly acute in the officer corps; only 283 of the 18,000 men who had by 1912 graduated from the OTC had joined, leaving the Special Reserve some 50 per cent short in subalterns.

From March 1911, former Regular soldiers, up to 36 years of age, could enlist into the Special Reserve as long as certain conditions were met. They were not permitted to serve beyond the age of 42. They were exempted from basic training, but would attend the annual camp.

In 1910, Haldane established the Veteran Reserve, renamed later to National Reserve. It was recruited from former pre-Territorial Force auxiliaries, time-expired territorials and ex-regular soldiers. Faced with a shortfall in the Special Reserve of 13,000 in 1914, Haldane's successor, John Seely, identified the similar number of National Reservists who had agreed to be liable for service overseas as the means of bringing it up to establishment.

== First World War ==
Special Reserve officer memorialised in the book Bond of Sacrifice, published in 1917. The biographical details demonstrate how the provenance of the Special Reserve was rooted in the former auxiliary institutions.

The Special Reserve, unlike the militia, did have an overseas service commitment for its members and, in wartime, it was seen that the Special Reserve battalions would take on the twin roles of draft finding for regular units, and home defence.

In August 1914, the line infantry could call upon 80,688 men of the Army Reserve, in addition to the Special Reserve. The Special Reserve with only 47,893 men against an establishment of 63,170, was a quarter below strength. Nearly one in five were under 19 years of age, thus ineligible for active service. The Army Reserve soldiers were the first to be sent as drafts, with the Special Reserve second in precedence. The Official History notes that Special Reserve drafts were despatched a month into the fighting, with the Army Reserve component having already being depleted. (Note: ‘It is significant of the heavy and unexpected wastage that within a month of firing the first shot, the supply of Regular Reservists for many regiments had been exhausted, and that men of the Special Reserve – the Militia of old days – were beginning to take their place.)

In support of staffing the Special Reserve battalions, War Office Instruction 117 dated 17 August 1914 demanded new recruits aged 30 years and over were posted to Reserve battalion, not to New Army. In contrast, Army Order 341 dated 30 August 1914 changed the age threshold to 35, with former non-commissioned officers, regardless of age, being posted to the New Army units. (Note: 'all ex-regular Non-commissioned Officers irrespective of age and all men under 35 years of age will be posted to units of the new 6 Divisions of Army Troops. Other men will be posted to Reserve units of the Regular Army') The order changed the age limit for ex-soldiers to enlist in the Special Reserve, being raised to 45 for ORs and 50 for certain NCOs. (Note: '(a) Certain selected men who were non-commissioned officers in the Regular Army above the rank of sergeant at the time of discharge, may be accepted up to the age of 50 years. (b) Men who has served in the Regular Army, Militia, Special Reserve, the Territorial or Volunteer Forces for not less than 1 year and have been discharged with a military character not less than "Fair" may be accepted up to the age of 45 years.') Despite the conflict of interest - on the one hand, the New Army battalions needed to be recruited and trained, on the other the regular battalions in the field still required reinforcements - on 17 September 1914 Kitchener made a statement in Parliament that 'Special Reserve units will be maintained at their full establishments as feeders to the Expeditionary Force.' The priority placement of recruits was to make up the strength of K1 units, then the Reserve battalions, and then the K2 units. (Note: Peter Simkins comments in "Kitchener's Army" that once K1 had been formed, the SR battalions would be brought up to strength of 2,000 before K2 was formed. This, according to Simkins was decided on 27th Aug 1914. Any further surplus would then be used for the formation of K2... [There was] the realisation that the SR would need far more men in the immediate future than their establishment of 606 ORs... Clearly at one extreme by the 5th Sep some Regiments had formed a K1 battalion, filled the SR battalion to 2,000 from surplus men and were already starting to form the K2 battalion. At the other extreme some Regiments were still short on all three counts. This intrigues me. If Kitchener men from the recruiting pool were being sent to the SR battalions, these men were more likely to get to the front line earlier. One might reasonably assume there was some kind of selection process to choose K men who made up the SR battalions to 2,000.')

Drafts began to be sent to the regular battalions; the 3rd Battalion, Essex Regiment, for example, had already sent 300 men to the regiment's 2nd Battalion. The huge increase in numbers led to over-crowded depots, and the 3rd Battalion, Duke of Cornwall's Light Infantry, was so overwhelmed that it had to send many men on to other regimental depots. Special Reserve units experienced a high turnover of men in bringing their regular battalions up to strength and, once battle had been joined in France, replacing casualties. At one stage in 1914, consideration was given to reinforcing the Central Force, the mobile element of Britain's home defence force, with three Special Reserve divisions, but the idea was quickly dropped because of the transient population of the Special Reserve battalions at any given time.

On the outbreak of war the three regiments of Special Reserve Horse were broken up to provide divisional cavalry squadrons for infantry divisions on the Western Front. They formed reserve regiments to supply their own drafts. Similarly, the Special Reserve artillery manned the ammunition columns, but there were no subsequent replacements for this pool of men. The two Special Reserve Royal Engineer units each maintained a training depot and supplied a number of specialist siege and railway companies for overseas service.

The demographic of the Special Reserve was transformed, from that of young men, to that of older men with prior military experience. Army Order 295, dated 6 August 1914, announced supplementary terms of service by which a man could enlist in the Special Reserve. Ex-soldiers were eligible to 'enlist in the Special Reserve for a period of one year, or, if the war lasts longer, for the duration of the war.' Given the promptness with which AO 295 was published, it seems likely that the authorities had realised that they would be in deep trouble without the use of the Special Reserve as a pool to absorb ex–regulars. 64,223 infantrymen enlisted under AO 295 by 30 September 1914, out of a larger total of 74,846 reenlisted men. From 1 October 1914 onwards a further 42,636 men re-enlisted, of which 27,188 were Line Infantry. These supplementary terms were rescinded on 7 November 1914 by Army Order 470, having served the purpose of facilitating the reenlistment of former soldiers, but it stressed that men could still enlist in the Special Reserve 'under conditions that existed before the war'.

By September 1914, the Special Reserve had provided 35,000 replacements and was becoming so short of trained men that its ability to perform its home defence functions was in doubt. The problem was exacerbated by the loss of many of its instructors to the New Army. In the first year of the war, the 3rd Battalion, Queen's Own Cameron Highlanders, supplied over 3,800 officers and men in drafts to its regular battalions, and similar efforts were made by almost every reserve battalion. Field Marshal Sir John French, Commander-in-Chief, Home Forces, acknowledged the great difficulties the Special Reserve faced in "performing the double duty of training drafts...and defending our shores".

Because of the large number of pre-existing Irish Militia regiments, the Irish regular regiments had been assigned an unusually high proportion of 4th and 5th 'Extra Reserve' battalions in 1908. These units believed that they had been promised that they would serve overseas as formed units, leaving the draft-finding role to the 3rd (Reserve) battalions. After the outbreak of war there was a proposal to form the eight 4th battalions and four 5th battalions into a complete Irish Division, which was supported by the Nationalist leader John Redmond, who lobbied the War Office on the subject. However, the Irish Extra Reserve battalions became draft-finding units, duplicating the work of the 3rd battalions. They steadily declined in numbers as volunteering dropped off and conscription was never imposed in Ireland. In May 1918 many were absorbed into their regiment's 3rd battalions.

In 1915, Special Reserve units began assisting in the training of Volunteer Training Corps battalions; the Suffolk Volunteers, for example, received training from the instructors of the 3rd Battalion, Suffolk Regiment, and the Huddersfield Volunteers were attached to the Special Reserve battalion of the Seaforth Highlanders. The introduction of conscription early in 1916 overwhelmed the New Army's regiment-based system of training new recruits, resulting in the reorganisation of its training battalions into the centralised Training Reserve in September 1916. The Special Reserve battalions remained responsible for training replacements for their own regular battalions, but when they were at full establishment, new recruits were sent to the Training Reserve.

It is noted that none of the 3rd (Reserve) battalions served overseas as a complete unit during the conflict. In 1916, after conscription had been introduced a number of Special Reserve battalions (all 'Extra Reserve') were selected for service on the Western Front.

- 7th (Extra Reserve) Battalion, Royal Fusiliers
- 4th (Extra Reserve) Battalion, King's (Liverpool Regiment)
- 4th (Extra Reserve) Battalion, Bedfordshire Regiment
- 4th (Extra Reserve) Battalion, South Staffordshire Regiment
- 4th (Extra Reserve) Battalion, North Staffordshire Regiment

The few casualties among Special Reservist units at home were a result of air raids – the 3rd (Reserve) Battalion, Manchester Regiment, lost 31 men during a Zeppelin raid on Cleethorpes in April 1916. The 3rd Battalion, Suffolk Regiment, suffered a number of fatalities in two air raids at Felixstowe during July 1917 – and most losses were due to sickness or training accidents.

The outbreak of the war saw a transformation of the Special Reserve, as its men were quickly posted to make good the losses suffered by the British Expeditionary Force. The initiative of Army Order 295 had absorbed the pool of ex-soldiers that were available by autumn 1914. Whilst it was still possible to enlist in the Special Reserve, it was preferred that recruits would enlist under Regular terms of service, for the duration of the war, as announced by Army Order 470 on 7 November 1914. The introduction of conscription, by the Military Service Act of 27 January 1916, effectively ended recruitment of other ranks under Special Reserve terms of service. Around 30,000 were commissioned into the Special Reserve of officers. (Note: 'During the War about 30,000 Officers were appointed to Special Reserve Commissions and served in the Army. All have now been, or will be demobilized. Of the Officers who belonged to the Special reserve before the War, 927 were serving on 1st October 1919.')

== Postwar ==
After the war, the Special Reserve was only some 9,000 strong, and a committee chaired by General Alexander Hamilton-Gordon concluded in July 1919 that it should be abolished. By the end of the year it had effectively ceased to exist. The routine nature of its wartime duties meant that it received little attention in most post-war regimental histories. (Note: 'In the record of the war of 1914-1918 the share of the Special Reserve, if inconspicuous and often overlooked, was of fundamental importance.') When the Territorial Force was reconstituted as the Territorial Army in 1921, the Special Reserve was also renamed, becoming the Militia. Its units retained the same role, acting as regiments' third battalions in the provision of a reserve for the regular battalions, but no effort was made to recruit into it, other than in Northern Ireland where they provided the only auxiliary force. Militia battalions existed on paper until they were disbanded in April 1953. In 1924 the Special Reserve/Militia's function was absorbed by the Supplementary Reserve, which was tasked with providing the regular army with specialist technical support in times of crisis.

== Bibliography ==
- Atkinson, Capt. C.T. (2014) [1931]. The History of the South Wales Borderers 1914 - 1918. Naval & Military Press. ISBN 978-1-78331-077-7.
- Pritchard, Harry Lionel, ed. (1952). History of the Corps of Royal Engineers, Vol V, The Home Front, France, Flanders and Italy in the First World War. Chatham: Institution of Royal Engineers.
- Brown, Brig-Gen William Baker (1952). History of the Corps of Royal Engineers, Vol IV, 1885-1914. Chatham: Institution of Royal Engineers.
- Beckett, Ian Frederick William (2008). Territorials: A Century of Service. Plymouth: DRA Publishing. ISBN 978-0-95-578131-5.
- Beckett, Ian Frederick William (2011). Britain's Part-Time Soldiers: The Amateur Military Tradition: 1558–1945. Barnsley, South Yorkshire: Pen & Sword Military. ISBN 978-1-84-884395-0.
- Bowman, Timothy; Connelly, Mark (2012). The Edwardian Army: Recruiting and Deploying the British Army 1902-1914. Oxford: Oxford University Press. ISBN 978-0-19-954278-9.
- Chandler, David G. (2003). The Oxford History of the British Army. Oxford: Oxford University Press. ISBN 978-0-19-280311-5.
- Daniell, David Scott (2005) [1951]. Cap of Honour: The 300 Years of the Gloucestershire Regiment (3rd ed.). Stroud, Gloucestershire: Sutton Publishing. ISBN 978-0-7509-4172-3.
- Dennis, Peter (1987). The Territorial Army 1907–1940. Woodbridge, Suffolk: Royal Historical Society. ISBN 978-0-86-193208-5.
- Dunlop, John K. (1938). The development of the British Army 1899–1914. London: Methuen.
- Edmonds, J. E. (2021) [1933]. Military Operations France and Belgium, 1914: Mons, the Retreat to the Seine, the Marne and the Aisne August–October 1914. History of the Great War. Vol. I (3rd ed.). Uckfield, East Sussex: Naval & Military Press. ISBN 978-1-78-331611-3.
- Frederick, J.B.M. (1984). Lineage Book of British Land Forces 1660-1978, Volume I. Wakefield: Microform Academic Publishers. ISBN 1-85117-007-3.
- Gillott, Martin (January 2015). "British Line Infantry Reserves for the Great War - Part 3". Stand To! (102). The Western Front Association: 14–20.
- Hay, George (2017). The Yeomanry Cavalry and Military Identities in Rural Britain, 1815–1914. London: Palgrave Macmillan. ISBN 978-3-31-965538-3.
- James, E.A. (2001) [1978]. British Regiments 1914–18. Uckfield: Naval & Military Press. ISBN 978-1-84342-197-9.
- Langley, David (June 2014). "British Line Infantry Reserves for the Great War - Part 1". Stand To! (100). The Western Front Association: 23–27.
- Langley, David (September 2014). "British Line Infantry Reserves for the Great War - Part 2". Stand To! (101). The Western Front Association: 27–31.
- Litchfield, Norman E.H. (1987). The Militia Artillery 1852–1909 (Their Lineage, Uniforms and Badges). Nottingham: Sherwood Press. ISBN 0-9508205-1-2.
- Mitchinson, K. W. (2005). Defending Albion: Britain's Home Army 1908-1919. London: Palgrave Macmillan. ISBN 978-1-40-393825-1.
- Mitchinson, K. W. (2014). The Territorial Force at War, 1914–1916. London: Palgrave Macmillan. ISBN 978-1-13-745159-0.
- Simkins, Peter (2007). Kitchener's Army: The Raising of the New Armies, 1914–16. Barnsley, South Yorkshire: Pen & Sword Military. ISBN 978-1-84-415585-9 – via archive.org.
- Watson, Graham E.; Rinaldi, Richard A. (2018). The Corps of Royal Engineers: Organization and Units 1889–2018. Tiger Lily Books. ISBN 978-171790180-4.
- Whitton, Frederick Ernest (1924). The History of the Prince of Wales's Leinster Regiment (Royal Canadians). Vol. Part II: The Great War and the Disbandment of the Regiment. Aldershot: Gale & Polden. OCLC 985115405.
- Army Council (1921). General Annual Reports on the British Army (including the Territorial Force) for the Period from 1st October, 1913, to 30th September, 1919. Parliamentary Paper 1921, XX, Cmd.1193. Parliament United Kingdom.
- Monthly Army List for 1914. London: His Majesty's Stationery Office. 8 August 1914 – via nls.uk. "Corrected to the 31st July 1914"
- "Scheme for the Special Reserve". War Office - Special Army Order. 23 December 1907. Archived from the original on 5 December 2023 – via Army Service Numbers. "Scanned images of the pages of this War Office publication costing two pence"

=== External links ===
- Special Reservists identified from the WW1 campaign medal rolls, via FMP
- Special Reservists of the South Wales Borderers in 1914 and 1915, via FMP
- Special Reservists (1908 to 1914) - Bedfordshire Regiment stories and service number issue dates, via GWF
