= White people in Hawaii =

Racial and multi-ethnic group

White Americans in Hawaii
Ka poe keokeo ma Hawaii (Hawaiian)

Total population
- 333,261 (22.9%) (2020)

Regions with significant populations
- Hawaii County: 33.6%
- Maui County: 32.9%
- Kauaʻi County: 31.7%
- Honolulu County: 18.5%

Languages
- English, Spanish, French, German, Italian, Russian, and Portuguese

Religion
- Predominantly Christianity (Mainly Protestant and Roman Catholicism) and Judaism

White people in Hawaii, also known as Haole, are White people of predominantly European descent. They form 22.9% of the population according to the 2020 United States Census. There are around 294,102 White people in Hawaii. Including people with two or more races, the number of people with some European ancestry is 476,162 (39.3%), meaning that around 14.6% of the population is mixed race. European ancestry, the majority are of Portuguese and British descent, with a small number of European immigrants of French, German, and Spanish descent.

== History ==
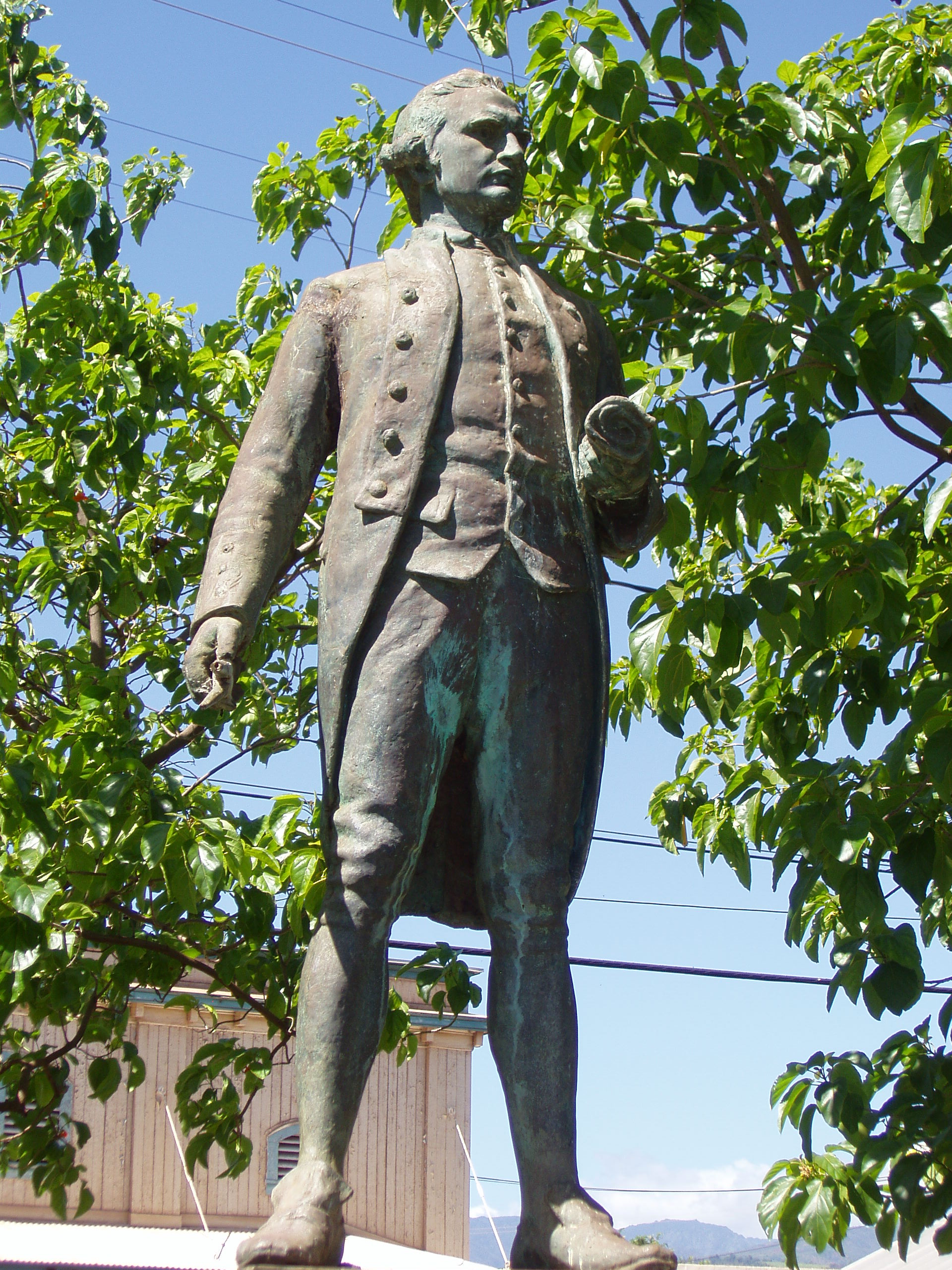
James Cook statue in Waimea

British explorer James Cook was the first European to land in the islands of present-day Hawaii on January 20, 1778. On a subsequent visit, he was killed by Native Hawaiians in Kealakekua during his attempt to kidnap and hold the king of the Island of Hawai'i Chief Kalaniʻōpuʻu in exchange for a stolen longboat. An obelisk memorializing Cook's death can be seen from all points in Kealakekua Bay, on a plot of land deeded in perpetuity by the Kingdom of Hawaii to the United Kingdom. The arrival of European missionaries resulted in conversion of Hawaii to Christianity. Europeans brought diseases such smallpox, tuberculosis, measles and syphilis to Hawaii, which decimated the Native Hawaiian population. James Cook and his crew also introduced sexually transmitted infections such as syphilis and gonorrhea. When Cook arrived, there were approximately 300,000 Native Hawaiians. However, by 1853, their population had decreased to 70,000 because of the impact of white settlers. In 1893, American colonists who dominated Hawaii’s sugar industry quickly toppled the kingdom and created the Republic of Hawaii. With the support of the predominantly American elite, the United States annexed Hawaii as a territory in 1898.

== Demographics ==
=== Ancestries ===
Ancestry by origin	Number	% (do not add to 100)
(Germany) German	75,586	
(England) English	70,976	
(Republic of Ireland) Irish	66,195	
(Portugal) Portuguese	38,091	
(Italy) Italian	32,370	
(France) French	18,510	
Total		

== Notable people ==
- Neil Abercrombie, the seventh Governor of Hawaii from 2010 to 2014.
- Linda Lingle, the sixth Governor of Hawaii from 2002 until 2010.

== See also ==
- Kill Haole Day
- Europeans in Oceania
- Greeks in Hawaii
- Portuguese immigration to Hawaii
- Spanish immigration to Hawaii
- White Americans in California
- White Americans in Maryland
- Puerto Rican immigration to Hawaii
