= 10th Battalion, Middlesex Regiment =

10th Battalion, Middlesex Regiment (Duke of Cambridge's Own)
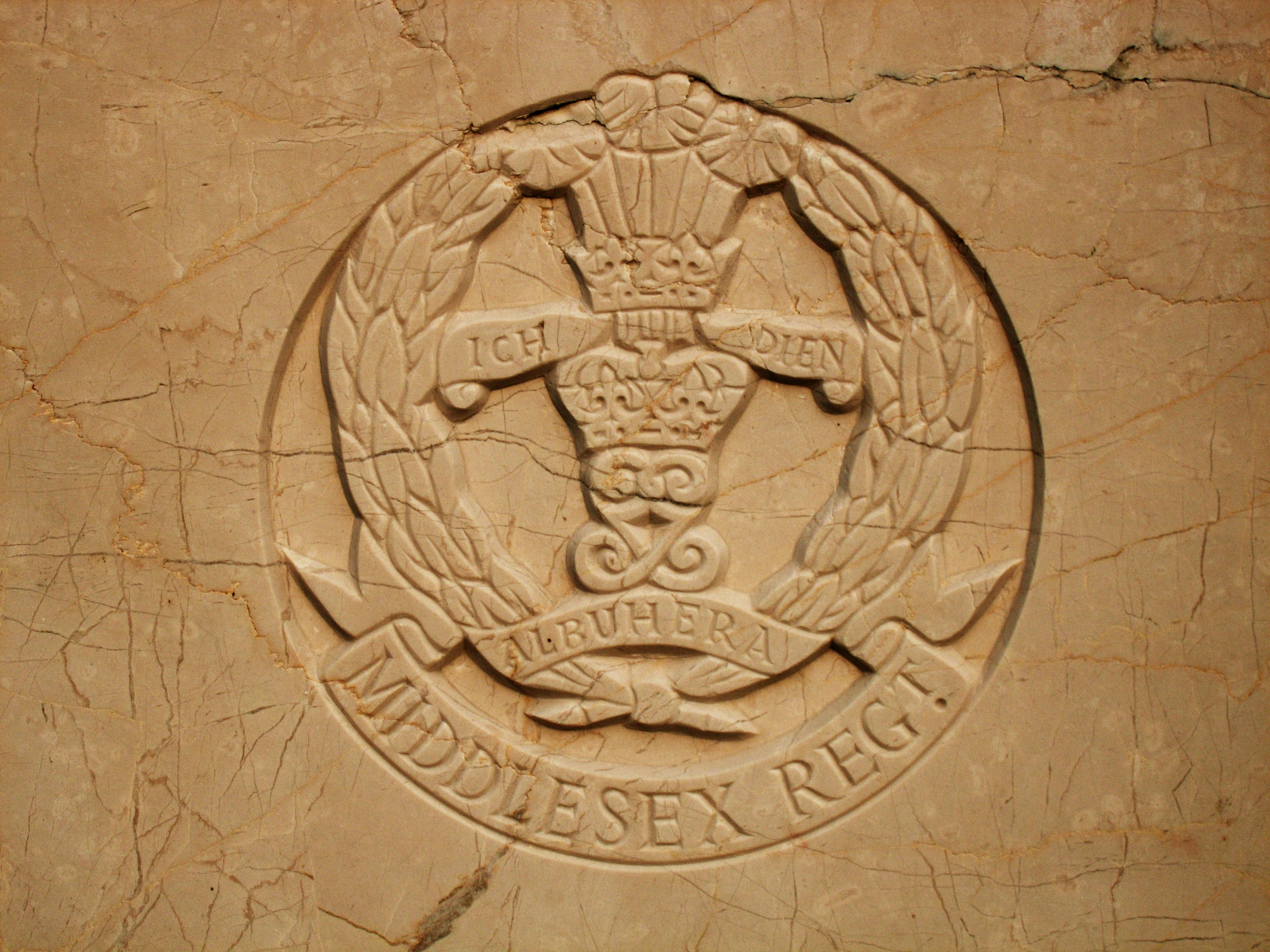
- Badge of the Middlesex Regiment (Duke of Cambridge's Own)
- Active: 1908–1920
- Country: United Kingdom
- Branch: Territorial Force
- Type: Infantry
- Size: 1–4 Battalions
- Garrison/HQ: Ravenscourt Park
- Engagements: Gallipoli Campaign; Sinai and Palestine Campaign; Western Front

Commanders
- Colonel of the Regiment: Frederick, 4th Lord Wolverton

The 10th Battalion, Middlesex Regiment, was an infantry unit of Britain's Territorial Force from 1908 to 1920. Based in Ravenscourt Park, West London, its part-time soldiers saw service at Gallipoli, in Palestine, and on the Western Front during the First World War. After the war the battalion was amalgamated into a unit of the new Royal Corps of Signals.

== Origin ==
When the former Volunteer Force was subsumed into the new Territorial Force (TF) under the Haldane Reforms in 1908, the 2nd (South) Middlesex Volunteer Rifle Corps and the 4th Middlesex Volunteer Rifle Corps (The Kensington Rifles) were reorganised to form the 13th (Kensington) Battalion in the new London Regiment. This amalgamation, with its loss of traditions of their old unit, was not popular with the 2nd (South) Middlesex, and about 300 officers and men left to form the nucleus of the 10th Battalion, Duke of Cambridge's Own (Middlesex Regiment). This was considered a new unit, and was not allowed to retain the battle honour that detachments of the 2nd (South) Middlesex had won for service in the Second Boer War. However, the 2nd Middlesex's Honorary Colonel, Lord Wolverton, and Regular Army adjutant, Captain J.F.C. Fuller, continued in their positions with the 10th Middlesex and helped to set up the new unit.

The new battalion established its headquarters (HQ) with C–H Companies at Stamford Brook Lodge, Ravenscourt Park; A Company was based at St John's College, Battersea, and B Company at St Mark's College, Chelsea, in King's Road. The St Pauls School Cadet Corps transferred its affiliation from the 2nd (South) Middlesex to the new unit. Together with the 7th, 8th and 9th Bns, the 10th Battalion formed the Middlesex Brigade of the TF's Home Counties Division.

== First World War ==
=== Mobilisation ===
When mobilisation orders arrived on 4 August 1914 about half of the 10th Battalion were with the Home Counties Division at its annual training, marching from Aldershot to Salisbury Plain. The Middlesex Brigade was at Larkhill, and 10th Battalion had to lay out in the rain outside Amesbury station before it could entrain at 05.30 on 5 August. It then returned to Ravenscourt Park and together with the men who could not attend camp it mobilised under Lieutenant-Colonel C.R. Johnson, TD, who had been its Commanding Officer (CO) since 27 July 1912. The battalion moved to its war station at Sheerness the same day, leaving an officer to enlist the 300 or so men required to bring the battalion up to its war establishment. This was quickly accomplished by the flood of volunteers coming forwards.

On 10 August, units of the Territorial Force were invited to volunteer for overseas service, and on 31 August, the formation of a reserve or 2nd Line unit was authorised for each 1st Line unit where 60 per cent or more of the men had volunteered. The titles of these 2nd Line units would be the same as the original, but distinguished by a '2/' prefix. The Home Service-only and under-age men, together with the recruits who were coming forward, remained at the depot to form the 2/10th Bn, which came into existence on 12 September under the command of Lt-Col Johnson and was almost at full strength by the end of October. Subsequently, 3/10th and 4/10th Battalions were formed.

=== 1/10th Battalion ===
Two 1st Line TF battalions of the Middlesex Regiment left in early September 1914 to relieve Regular battalions in the Gibraltar garrison, then in October the rest of the Home Counties Division was ordered to India to relieve Regular troops there. The 1/10th Middlesex embarked at Southampton on 29 October in the transport Royal George, and disembarked at Bombay on 2 December. On arrival, the Home Counties Division was split up and the battalions were distributed to stations all over India. By May 1915, the 1/10th Bn was at Fort William (Calcutta), with 'hill parties' (convalescents and leave men) at Darjeeling. For the next four years the 1/10th Bn acted as a peacetime garrison, while suffering a steady drain of its best men to officer training and other duties. For example, on 5 November 1917 the battalion supplied a draft of 100 men to the 1/9th Middlesex to bring that battalion up to full strength to take part in the Mesopotamian campaign. The battalion returned to the UK after the end of the war and was demobilised at Crowborough in Sussex on 20 November 1919.

=== 2/10th Battalion ===
The 2/10th Battalion joined the 2nd Middlesex Brigade, which was close to full strength by 22 October 1914, and the 2nd Home Counties Division began to form in the Windsor area soon afterwards. Training was hampered by lack of modern arms and equipment: only a few old .256-in Japanese Ariska rifles were available for the infantry. However, in this half-trained and -equipped state, the 2/10th Middlesex was sent on 24 April 1915 (Note: Some sources suggest that the 2/10th was a composite battalion including men drawn from the 2/8th and 2/9th Bns.)to join the Welsh Border Brigade in the Welsh Division, which was preparing to go overseas. The Welsh Border Brigade had sent its 1st Line battalions to reinforce Regular divisions on the Western Front and was being reconstituted at Cambridge with 2nd Line Home Counties battalions; soon afterwards it was renumbered 160th Brigade when the division became the 53rd (Welsh) Division.

In May the division moved to Bedford to continue its training, and on 2 July was reported fit for service in the Mediterranean. The battalion entrained for Devonport Dockyard on 17 July and embarked on HM Transport Huntsgreen (formerly the German Norddeutscher Lloyd shipping line's Derfflinger). It disembarked in Alexandria on 1 August and moved to Port Said.

==== Gallipoli ====
The 53rd (W) Division was destined as reinforcements for the Gallipoli Campaign. After sailing to Lemnos and then Imbros, the battalion landed on C Beach at Suvla Bay at about midnight on 8 August under the command of Lt-Col C.H. Pank. It began beach fatigues under shellfire before moving to the western slopes of Lala Baba at nightfall on 9 August. The landing had been chaotic, but 53rd (W) Division was ordered to attack the W Hills the following day to recover the position. The first phase of the attack, on Scimitar Hill, was to be carried out by 159th (Cheshire) Brigade, after which 158th (North Wales) Bde reinforced by 2/10th Middlesex from 160th Bde would pass through to attack the Anafarta Spur. 2/10th Middlesex set off at dawn across a salt lake to join the firing line at Chocolate Hill, with no cover and under heavy shelling, machine gun and rifle fire, and from Chocolate Hill the firing line was unable to advance to Scimitar Hill. A second attack was ordered for 16.30, but the only troops to advance were two companies of the 2/10th, who went forward about 500 yards (460 m) before discovering that they were unsupported and fell back, having lost further casualties.

The companies were gathered during the night and the battalion was moved a few hundred yards to its left, where it dug in until relieved on 13 August. It then returned to the beach and fatigue duties until the end of the month, under continual shellfire during daylight hours. From then on the battalion endured spells in the front line alternating with digging positions in the rear. By the end of October it was reduced by battle casualties and sickness to about half of its pre-landing strength. In November the 2/10th Middlesex was reinforced by four officers and 200 men from the 9th Bn Sherwood Foresters in 11th (Northern) Division. The battalion was evacuated to Lemnos aboard the El Kahirah on 13 December.

==== Palestine ====
From Lemnos the 53rd Division was shipped to Alexandria, and began a long period of rest and recuperation guarding the Nile Valley in Egypt. When the Turkish Army attacked the Suez Canal defences in August 1916, leading to the Battle of Romani, only part of 53rd Division was actually engaged, but the 2/10th Middlesex was present and so was later awarded the battle honour for Rumani.

The British opened the Sinai and Palestine Campaign in March 1917 when the Egyptian Expeditionary Force (EEF) advanced towards Gaza, with 53rd Division in the Desert Column. The 1st Battle of Gaza began at 03.30 on 26 March, when 160th Brigade started to cross Wadi Ghuzzee. Shortly afterwards, fog began to roll in from the sea, slowing the advance, but the attack began shortly after 11.45. By 13.30 the brigade had captured 'The Labyrinth', a maze of entrenched gardens, but 2/10th Middlesex's further advance was slowed up by four belts of barbed wire and at 15.30 it requested reinforcements and ammunition; two companies of 2/4th Queens (Royal West Surrey Regiment) arrived at 17.00. By 18.30 the whole position had been secured. But events had not gone so well elsewhere, and the brigade's advanced positions were still outflanked. At 19.00 the Middlesex's CO reported that unless reinforced, his position was untenable; nevertheless, he was ordered to consolidate. However 160th Bde was ordered to pull back at midnight, and by 04.30 on 27 March 2/10th Middlesex was back on its starting position behind Wadi Ghuzzee. The battalion's casualties amounted to four officers killed and five wounded, 14 other ranks (ORs) killed, 108 wounded and 22 missing.

A second attempt to take Gaza began on 17 April, and the 53rd Division attacked in the second phase on 19 April. The objective for 160th Brigade was Samson Ridge, and 2/10th Bn set out at 07.15 towards the right hand Redoubt on the ridge. The attack proceeded slowly, held up by machine gun fire, the top eventually being taken at the point of the bayonet. However, the attack elsewhere failed, and the troops dug in at the end of the day. The battalion had lost 2 officers killed and 7 wounded, 35 ORs killed or died of wounds, 6 missing and 132 wounded.

There followed a pause of several months while the EEF was reorganised. The 2/10th Bn's CO, Lt-Col V.L. Pearson, was promoted to command 160th Bde and was replaced by Major A.P. Hohler. The battalion participated in a number of raids, including the capture of Sugar Loaf Hill on 15 August. It was then withdrawn from the line for intensive training. On 24 October it returned to take up outpost positions before the 3rd Battle of Gaza opened on 31 October. This operation involved other formations outflanking the Gaza–Beersheba line, after which 2/10th Bn advanced its outposts on 1 and 2 November. 53rd Division was sent on 3 November to take the heights of Tel el Khuweilfe. 160th Brigade moved up a slight valley on the right, but found the enemy in strength, and holding the water supplies. The attack was renewed unsuccessfully the following day. The division kept up the pressure: on 6 November it fended off attack after attack on its advanced positions, quickly regaining them when pushed off; 2/10th Middlesex was in reserve for this action. Eventually the Turks were forced to evacuate the position after being outflanked elsewhere. 2/10th Battalion moved forwards to occupy the high ground during daylight on 13 and 14 November during the Action of El Mughar, for which it received the battle honour, though not actually engaged.

By early December the EEF was working round Jerusalem with 53rd (W) Division advancing towards Bethlehem as flank guard. 2/10th Middlesex and 2/4th Queen's were ordered to capture the hills at Beit Jala on 8 December and advanced under shellfire that was so accurate that the Middlesex had to pass one road junction by rushes by small parties. But the two battalions found the objective unoccupied. Jerusalem fell the following day. On 21 December, 160th Brigade carried out a minor operation at Ras ez Zamby near Jericho. At 05.00 2/4th Queens captured a Turkish post, and the Turks fell back to 'White Hill'. A company of 2/10th Middlesex, together with one of 2/4th Queen's, then took this position after fierce close fighting with bombs, bayonets, and clubbed rifles. On 27 December the Turks made a strong counter-attack towards Jerusalem; although 2/4th Queen's withdrew from White Hill, its machine guns prevented the Turks from holding it in force, and 2/10th Middlesex recaptured Ras ez Zamby. Meanwhile, a detached company of 2/10th Bn successfully held the Monastery at Deir Obeid for 12 hours against a separate Turkish attack, despite two Turkish field guns being brought up to breach the walls. Shortly afterwards the Turkish attackers were dispersed by British artillery, who also silenced another artillery attack the following day.

160th Brigade was rested for the first 10 days of January 1918, but after returning to the front east of Jerusalem it carried out a small operation to advance the line on 18 January, with two platoons of D Company, 2/10th Middlesex, assisting 2/4th Bn Royal West Kent Regiment. The EEF began a new operation on 19 February with Jericho as its objective. 2/10th Middlesex moved out at 22.00 the previous night to secure a crossing over the Wadi Asa. When the attack began at 05.30 on 19 February, C Company launched the battalion's attack towards the village of Rammun, but was held up by a group of Turks with a machine gun. Two platoons of D Company were sent up as reinforcements, and the village and high ground as taken by 08.45. The battalion then held it during the day under heavy shellfire. The following night was quiet: patrols found no sign of the enemy, and on 21 February Jericho was occupied by the EEF. The 2/10th Bn then advanced its positions under cover of bad weather. It then spent the first part of March roadmaking while the EEF advanced methodically towards the River Jordan.

During the subsequent operations in the Judaean Hills, 53rd Division was ordered to capture Tell 'Asur. This led to further heavy fighting, with half of 2/10th Bn marching by night to drive off a Turkish counter-attack at 04.55 on 10 March. 160th Brigade forced its way steadily forward over broken ground on 11 March to reach the hills beyond. On 12 March C Company assisted 2/4th West Kents in an unsuccessful attempt to take an unreconnoitred position.

The EEF then prepared to cross the Jordan on 21 March. A platoon of 2/10th Middlesex with two machine guns was ordered to make a feint crossing at the Auja ford while 'Shea's Group' threw troops across at other points. While Shea's Group carried out its trans-Jordan raid, 2/10th Middlesex remained west of the river skirmishing against the Turkish cavalry screen on 29 and 30 March. Otherwise the battalion was engaged mainly in roadmaking. Further skirmishing occurred on 22 April, when the battalion pushed an outpost forwards to 'Round Hill', which overlooked the Jordan, on 2 May when C Company drive off an attack on 'Ide Hill', and on 22/23 May when A and B Companies carried out a night raid on 'Fife Knoll'.

The summer saw the battalion alternating between holding the line and being in reserve. Lieutenant-Col Hohler left to command 160th Bde and Maj C. Jarrett assumed command. By now the EEF was suffering a manpower shortage, and on 19 August 1918 the 2/10 Bn left 160th Bde and moved back to El Qantara, Egypt, where it was broken up to provide drafts for other units.

=== 3/10th Battalion ===
The 3/10th Battalion was formed in May 1915 at Ravenscourt Park from details and surplus men from the 2/10th when that battalion was warned for overseas service. It was stationed at Ashford, then at Staines and Reigate, but real training began at Bulmer Camp, Brighton. By November 1915 it had joined 2nd Middlesex Bde (now numbered 201st (2/1st Middlesex) Brigade) at Tonbridge. The 2nd Home Counties Division (now 67th (2nd Home Counties) Division) formed part of Second Army in Central Force. 67th (2nd HC) Division had the dual role of home defence and supplying drafts to units serving overseas. It was twice warned for service in Ireland and in April 1917 for service with the British Expeditionary Force (BEF) on the Western Front, but these deployments never materialised and the division spent the whole war in England. By September 1916 it was stationed with 201st Bde round Bourne Park and Barham in Kent.

Few 3rd Line TF battalions saw service overseas, but in May 1917 the 3/10th Middlesex left 67th (HC) Division and embarked at Southampton for France. Landing at Le Havre on 1 June it moved to Hesdin where it joined 1st South African Brigade in 9th (Scottish) Division on 6 June. At first it was employed in the old German front line providing digging and wiring parties for the Royal Engineers (RE) constructing new defences. The companies then took turns in the front line for instruction in trench warfare, suffering a few casualties. On 23 July the battalion was attached to 4th Division in the Arras sector, and formally transferred to its 10th Bde on 2 August. The battalion carried out a few fighting patrols during the summer months.

==== Ypres ====
4th Division now entered the Third Ypres Offensive. After 10 days' training, the battalion moved into camp at Elverdinghe in the Ypres Salient on 29 September. That night the camp was bombed, 7 ORs being killed and 42 wounded. On 3/4 October it moved up to the front line near Langemarcke, from which it was the division was to launch its attack (part of the Battle of Broodseinde) on 4 October. 10th Brigade attacked at 06.00 from Eagle Trench, with 3/10th Middlesex supporting 2nd Bn Seaforth Highlanders. The Seaforths attacked over difficult, heavily shelled ground, behind a 'very ragged' barrage, crossed 19 Metre Hill and got about 80 yards down its forward slope. 3/10th Middlesex was about 150 yards behind, and dealt with a concrete pillbox on the left flank. By 09.30 the advance had stalled. Lying out on the open forward slope, the Seaforths and Middlesex were raked by machine gun fire. Unable to advance, the advanced companies had to withdraw in the face of German counter-attacks at 15.00. 3/10th Middlesex held its line of shell-holes, but despite holding the enemy was unable to obtain any support or ammunition. Finally at 03.15 on 5 October some ammunition arrived, enabling the remnants of the two battalions to maintain their position through the day and following night. At 00.15 on 6 October the battalion was relieved, and the survivors carried their wounded out of action. The battalion had suffered casualties of 12 officers and 365 ORs out of 30 officers and 492 ORs who had gone into action. 10th Brigade was not engaged in the subsequent attacks made by 4th Division, though 3/10th Middlesex provided some carrying parties for the RE and Machine Gun Corps during the Battle of Broodseinde and suffering further casualties.

=== 11th Entrenching Battalion ===
After the terrible casualties of 1917, the BEF was forced to reduce the establishment of an infantry brigade from four to three battalions. On 20 February 1918 the bulk of 3/10th Bn was drafted to reinforce other battalions. Battalion headquarters and the residue of 3/10th Bn became the core of 11th Entrenching Battalion, absorbing the residue of the Household Battalion, which had suffered appalling casualties at the Battle of Passchendaele. The CO of 3/10th Bn, Lt-Col C.H. Cautley, was appointed Officer Commanding, Third Army Group Entrenching Battalions, with his HQ at Albert. The cadre of the Household Battalion's HQ was disbanded on 15 March. (Note: A previous 11th Entrenching Bn had existed from November 1916 until April 1917 within XI Corps, consisting of reinforcements who were used for labour duties while awaiting drafting to their units.)

The role of the entrenching battalions was to carry out labour duties until their personnel were required as reinforcement drafts for the infantry. 11th Entrenching Bn was in the Arras sector under the orders of XVII Corps in Third Army. On 16 March the battalion was reinforced by 280 officers and men from the 11th (Service) Battalion, Queen's Own Royal West Kent Regiment (Lewisham), disbanded that day having just returned from the Italian Front with 41st Division.

When the German spring offensive opened on 21 March the battalion was working behind 15th (Scottish) Division and suffered some casualties over the next few days from the bombardment of Arras. On 28 March the battalion received orders to occupy the 'Purple Line' (a backstop line being organised by Third Army) from the River Scarpe to a point behind Arras. However, there was no breakthrough in this sector, and on 29 March the battalion entrained for Halloy-lès-Pernois, nearer Amiens, which was the new German objective. However, the German thrust was decisively stopped at the First Battle of Villers-Bretonneux and that phase of the offensive was called off on 5 April.

=== 4/10th Battalion ===
Like the 3/10th Bn, the 4/10th Middlesex was formed at Ravenscourt Park in May 1915 with the role of training drafts for the battalions serving overseas. The remaining home service men were withdrawn and together with those from the other TF battalions of the Middlesex Regiment, they formed 63rd Provisional Bn, designated the 32nd Middlesex from 1 January 1917. The 4/10th Bn moved to Cambridge, and was later stationed at Purfleet in Essex. On 8 April 1916 it was redesignated 10th Reserve Bn, Middlesex Regiment, and in September was absorbed into the 7th Reserve Bn.

== Disbandment ==
When the TF was reformed as the Territorial Army in 1920–21, 10th Bn Middlesex Regiment was merged with the Brighton-based former Home Counties Divisional Signal Company of the Royal Engineers to form 44th (Home Counties) Divisional Signals in the new Royal Corps of Signals. The new unit was based at the 10th Middlesex's drill hall at Stamford Brook Lodge, (though the original drill hall building may have been demolished in 1921) with a company at Brighton.

== Honorary Colonel ==
Frederick, 4th Lord Wolverton, who had been Honorary Colonel of the 2nd (South Middlesex) VRC since 29 August 1903, continued in that role with the 10th Bn Middlesex Regiment.

== Personalities ==
The following served with 10th Middlesex:

- Major-General J.F.C. 'Boney' Fuller, the noted military historian and theoretician, served as the Regular Army adjutant of 2nd (South) Middlesex RVC and was instrumental in converting it into the 10th Bn Middlesex Regiment. Fuller later claimed that his post with the 10th Middlesex inspired him to study soldiering seriously.)
- Victor McLaglen, the professional boxer and future Oscar-winning Hollywood actor, was commissioned as a Second lieutenant in the 10th Middlesex on 19 June 1915. He landed at Basra on 10 August 1916 and served as an Assistant Provost Marshal in Mesopotamia, ending the war as a Temporary Captain.

== Battle honours ==
The 10th Battalion contributed the following Battle honours to the Middlesex Regiment:

- 2/10th Battalion: Suvla, Landing at Suvla, Scimitar Hill, Gallipoli 1915, Rumani, Egypt 1917, Gaza, El Mughar, Jerusalem, Jericho, Jordan, Tell’ Asur, Palestine 1917-1918
- 3/10th Battalion: Ypres 1917, Polygon Wood, France and Flanders 1917-1918

== Memorials ==
There are the First World War memorial plaques to the 1/10th, 2/10th and 3/10th Battalions inside St Nicholas Church, Chiswick, where the Regimental Colours of the 10th Bn (1910–21) and the King's colours presented to 2/10th and 3/10th Bns after the war are displayed. The metal plaque to the 1/10th Bn (North Wall) lists 58 members of the battalion who died on service (though it is not clear how many of these were seconded to other units). There are two plaques to the 2/10th Bn (South Wall): one is of stone, the other accompanying the battalion roll of honour is of wood and incorporates a small cross carved in 1917 by the soldiers from wood found on the Mount of Olives; this cross was used by their Chaplain for the rest of the war. The plaque to the 3/10th Bn (South Wall) is made of brass.

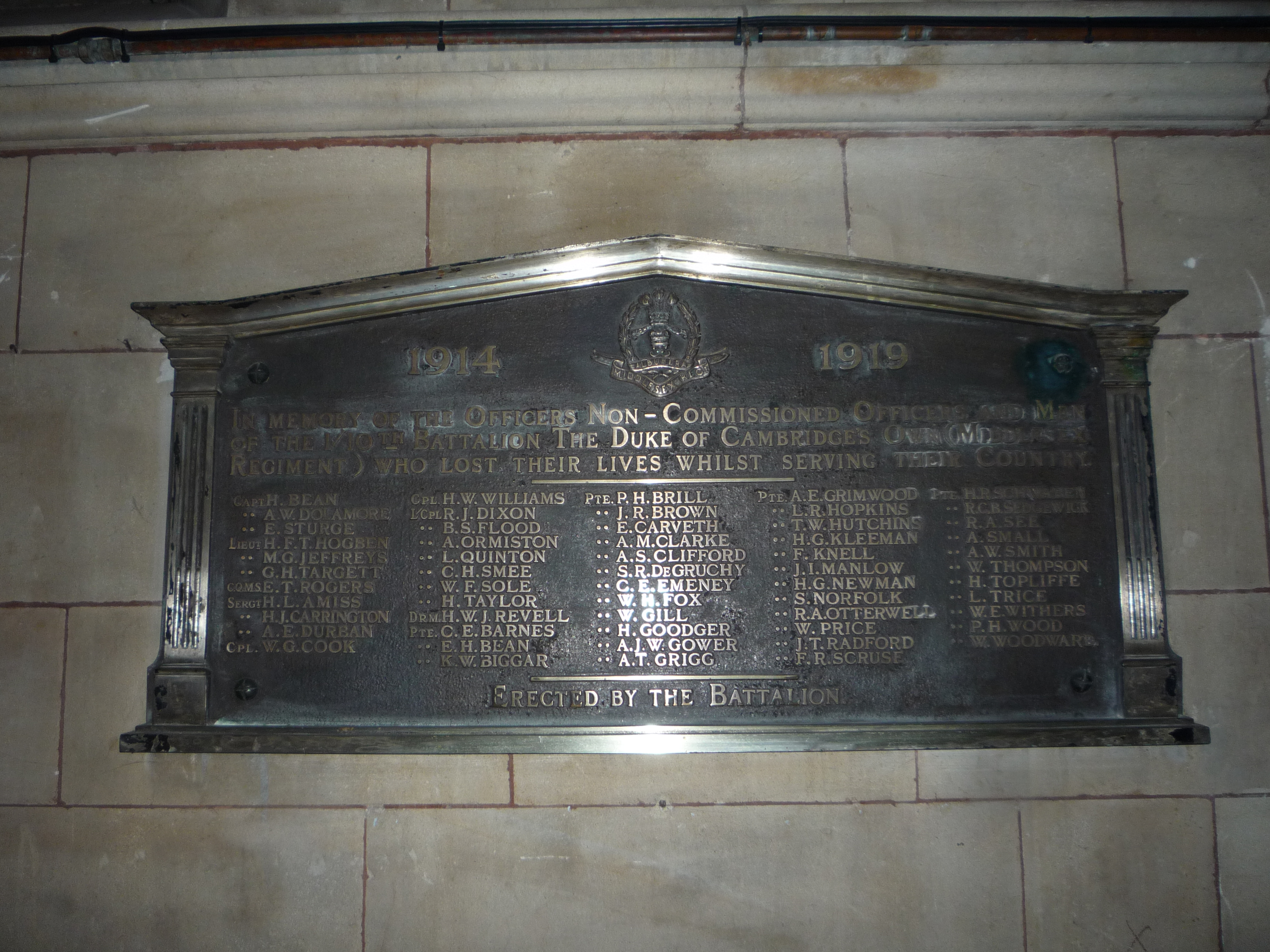
1/10th Bn memorial

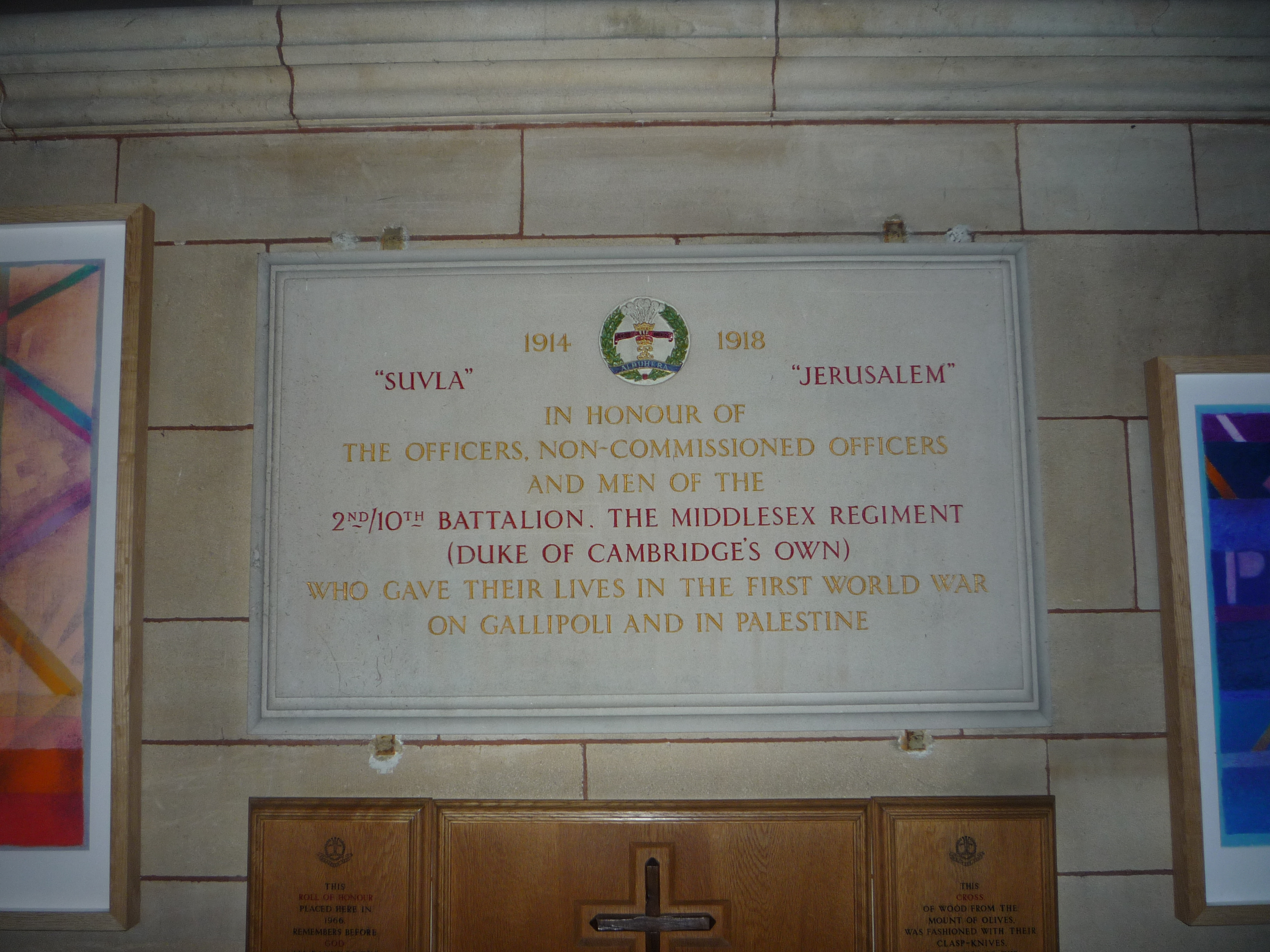
2/10th Bn memorial

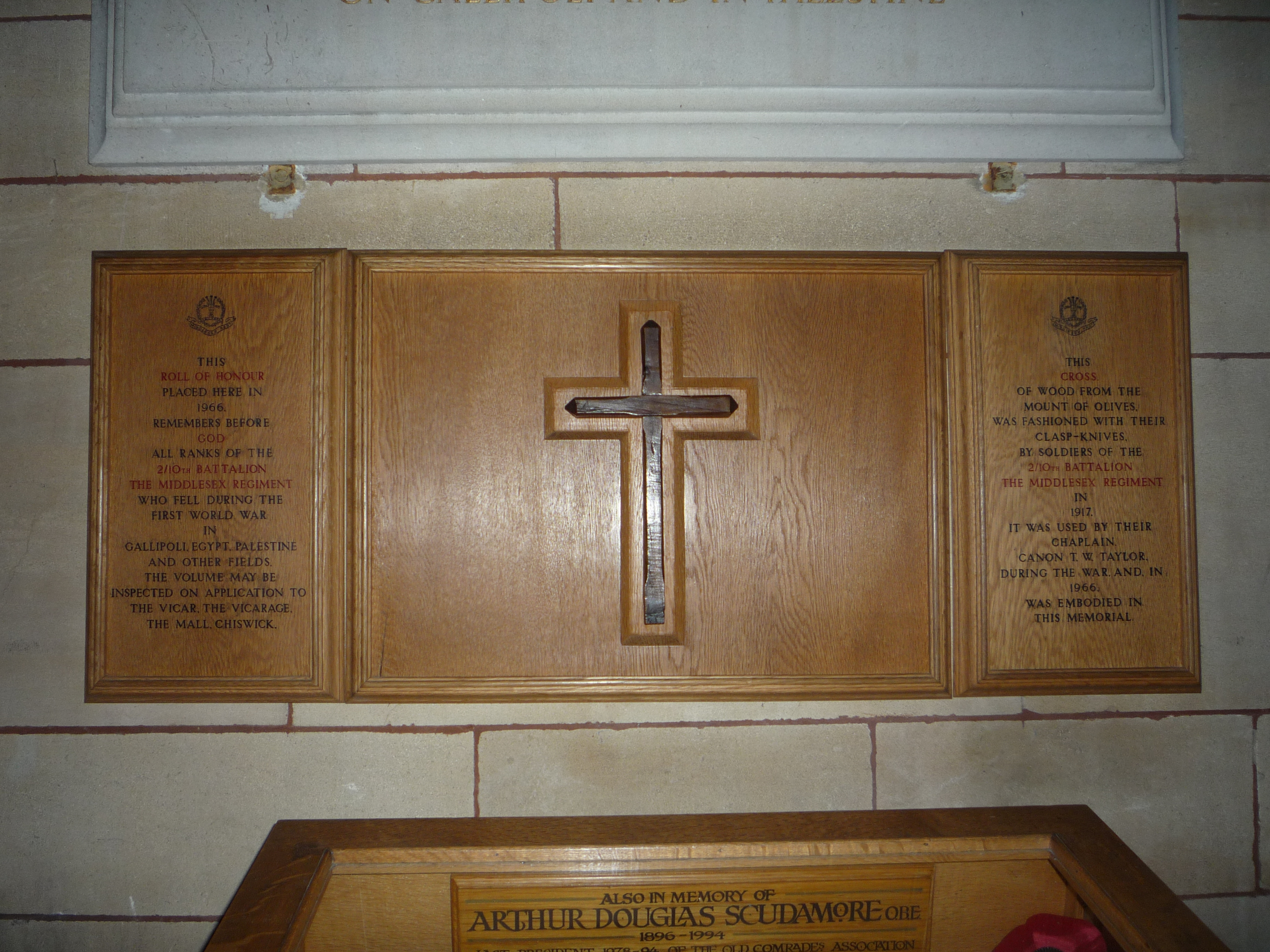
2/10th Bn memorial incorporating cross of wood from the Mount of Olives

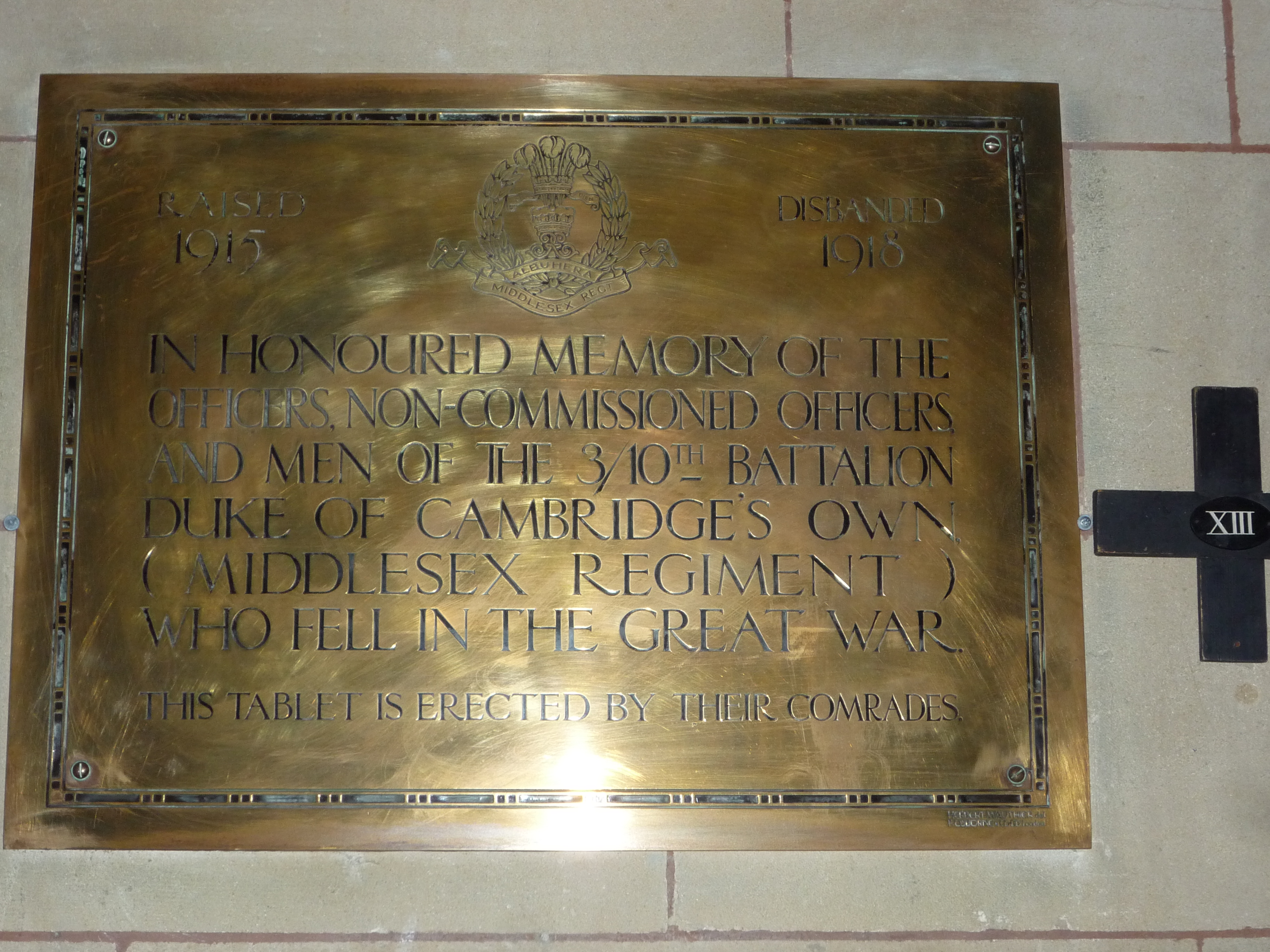
3/10th Bn memorial

There is also a First World War memorial plaque to the 10th Bn in the Army Reserve Centre, Deansbrook Road, Edgware.
