= Haole =

Hawaiian term for a non-native person

Haole (/ˈhaʊ.li/, HOW-lee; Hawaiian: [ˈhɐo̯.le]) is a Hawaiian term for individuals who are not native Hawaiian, and is applied to people primarily of white European ancestry.

== Background ==
The origins of the word predate the 1778 arrival of Captain James Cook, as recorded in several chants stemming from that time. The term was generally given to people of European descent; however, as more distinct terms began to be applied to individual European cultures and other non-European nations, the word haole began to refer mostly to Americans, including American black people (who were referred to as haole ʻele ʻele, i.e., "black haole"). Its connotations range from positive, neutral, and descriptive to invective, depending on the context in which it is used. Of the Polynesian race, Robert Louis Stevenson said: "God's best—at least God's sweetest works" and then wrote of the "beastly haoles". In correspondence to a friend, he stated, "What is a haole? You are one; and so, I am sorry to say, am I".

=== Etymology ===
A newspaper challenge in 1929 offered one hundred dollars to anyone who could satisfactorily explain to Dr. Theodore Richards what the word meant. James K. Keola stated that he believed the term only referred to white foreigners, giving as his own references such figures as Stephen Desha and Joseph M. Poepoe. Keola also believed the origins of the word came from the name Howell, part of Vancouver's team; however, today the name would be pronounced ha-wela. John M. Bright also stated that the term meant white and was in use as early as 1736. He also defined the term to mean "without husk or waif". W. O. Smith stated that in his youth he was told the term came from a fish called ahole. Lorrin Andrews writes in his dictionary that the term only refers to white foreigners and that for black foreigners the term haole eleele was used.

==== "Without breath" ====
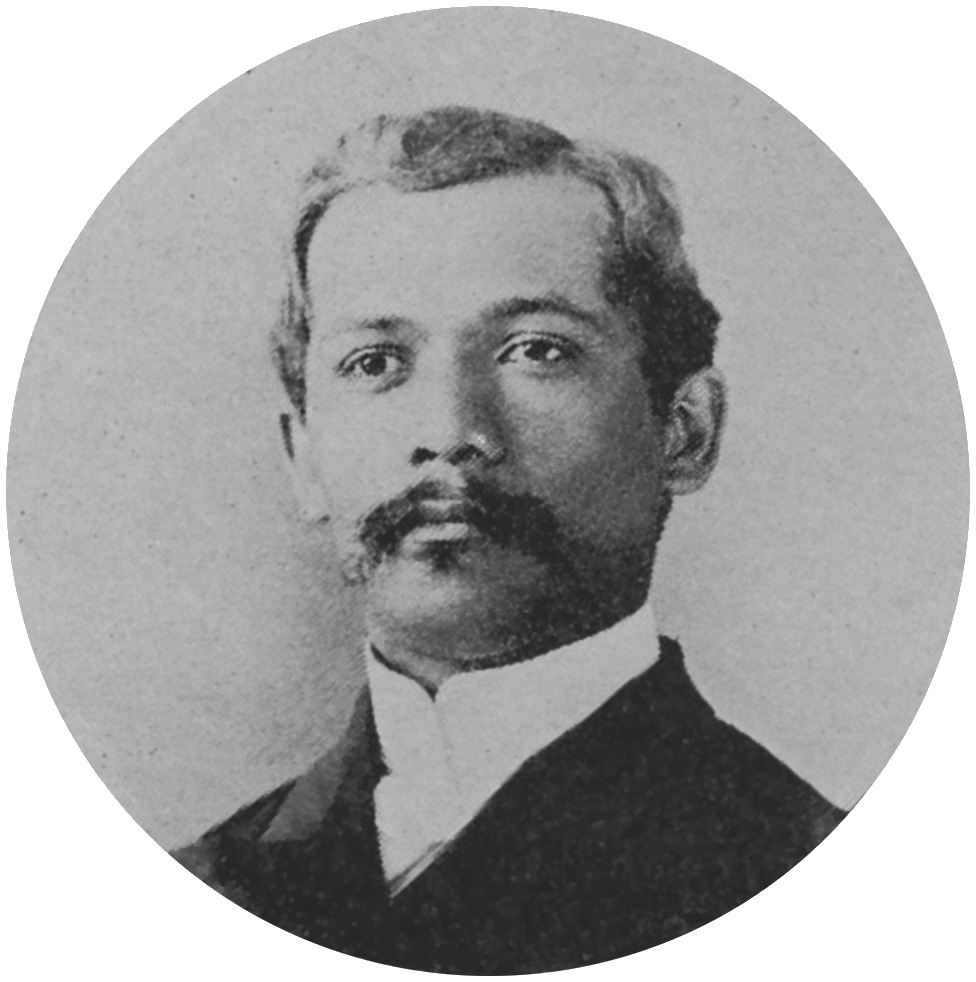
Professor Fred Beckley

A popular fable is that the word means "without breath". This meaning was attributed to Native Hawaiian Professor Frederick William Kahapula Beckley Jr. by Charles W. Kenn, in his 1944 article in the publication "Paradise of the Pacific". According to that author, Beckley states: "The white people came to be known as ha-ole (without breath) because after they said their prayers, they did not breathe three times as was customary in ancient Hawaii."

Kenn wrote: "In the primary and esoteric meaning, haole indicates a race that has no relation to one's own; an outsider, one who does not conform to the mores of the group; one that is void of the life element because of inattention to natural laws which make for the goodness in man." Albert J. Schütz, former professor of linguistics at the University of Hawaiʻi at Mānoa, believes that there is no documentation this ha-ole etymology is accurate and, based on that, states: "Thus, as far as we know, the word haole cannot be separated into shorter words".

==== Kahiki ====
According to Juri Mykkanen of the Helsinki Institute of Urban and Regional Studies in his book "Inventing Politics: A New Political Anthropology of the Hawaiian Kingdom", Hawaiians, in trying to understand and make sense of changing aliʻi, projected an entire cosmology onto everything they did and then passed down this narration to descendants. Under this belief, the origins of the term come from Kahiki, the ancestral lands of Hawaiians, stemming from the mele chant, "Kūkanaloa". In this chant a demi-god/hero from Kahiki is described as haole, as referenced in Samuel Kamakau's book Ruling Chiefs of Hawaii (1991), pages 114-115. As a symbol of origin, Kahiki had great significance to Hawaiians who saw themselves as descendants of a divine haole.

== Use of the word ==
Among Hawaiian residents who have descended from various ethnic groups who worked on the plantations (often known as "locals"), "haole" is a term used to describe people of European ancestry. The term itself can be merely descriptive, but it can be used in a way that is pejorative or discriminatory. Haole is only one of several words commonly used in Hawaii to describe various ethnicities. Technically, haole means someone who is foreign, as opposed to someone who is local. Haole has come to be a term for those of European ancestry. Also, it is associated with peoples who exhibit traditions, accents, and habits of the continental United States, as opposed to those which are prevalent in the Hawaiian islands. For example, if someone goes to the continental US and returns speaking with an accent typical of that area, people might say this person has become "haole-fied." Certain foods typical of the continental United States could be called "haole food," and if someone does something in a way that is not typical of what is done in Hawaii, that could be called "haole style."

Some native Hawaiians use the word "haole" as an insult or as part of a racial pejorative in incidents of harassment and physical assault towards white people in Hawaii. Hawaiian nationalists and language advocates, including Haunani-Kay Trask, have claimed that the word cannot be understood apart from the history of racial oppression in Hawaii, with Trask saying, "It's not pejorative—it's descriptive."

== See also ==
- Europeans in Oceania
- Greeks in Hawaii
- Kamaʻāina
- List of ethnic slurs
- Palagi, a term in Samoan sometimes used to describe foreigners
- Portuguese immigration to Hawaii
- Pākehā, the equivalent term in the Māori language primarily for European New Zealanders
- Spanish immigration to Hawaii
- Kill Haole Day
