= Royal Guernsey Light Infantry =

Infantry regiment of the British Army during World War I

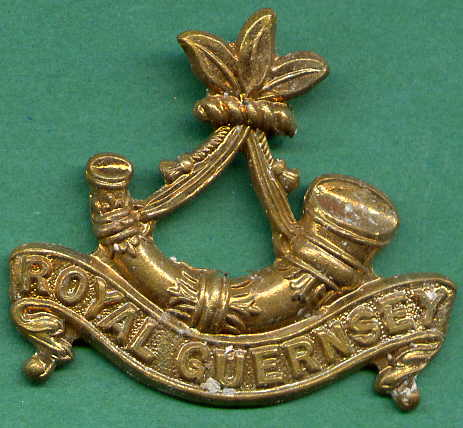
- Badge of the RGLI
- Active: 1916–1919
- Country: United Kingdom
- Branch: British Army
- Type: Infantry
- Size: 1,300 soldiers (1918)
- Part of: 29th Division 1917–1918
- Garrison/HQ: Fort George, Guernsey
- Motto: Diex Aïx (God Help Us)
- Engagements: Battle of Passchendaele; Battle of Cambrai; Battle of the Lys
- Battle honours: Awarded to the 1st Battalion; Royal Guernsey Militia; Passchendaele; Cambrai 1917; Lys; Estaires; Hazebrouck; France and Flanders 1917-18.
- Website: https://www.rgli.org/

Commanders
- Notable commanders: Colonel Henry Condamine (formation and training, 1916–1917); Lieutenant Colonel Thomas Havilland (combat command, 1917–1919)

The Royal Guernsey Light Infantry was an infantry regiment of the British Army that was formed from the Royal Guernsey Militia in 1916 to serve in World War I. They fought as part of the British 29th Division. Of the 2,280 men, most of whom came from Guernsey, who fought on the Western Front with the RGLI, 327 were killed and 667 were wounded.

Many Guernsey men had already volunteered for regiments in the British Army before the RGLI was formed. The RGLI was created because there was no Guernsey-named regiment to underline the island's devotion to the Crown.

The regimental motto, Diex Aïx, derives from the battle cry used by the Duke of Normandy 1,000 years earlier.

The regiment was disbanded in 1919 but the regimental tradition lives on in the Guernsey Army Cadet Force (Det.) Light Infantry, who, although they do not wear the RGLI cap badge, still keep alive the history of the Regiment within the detachment.

== History ==
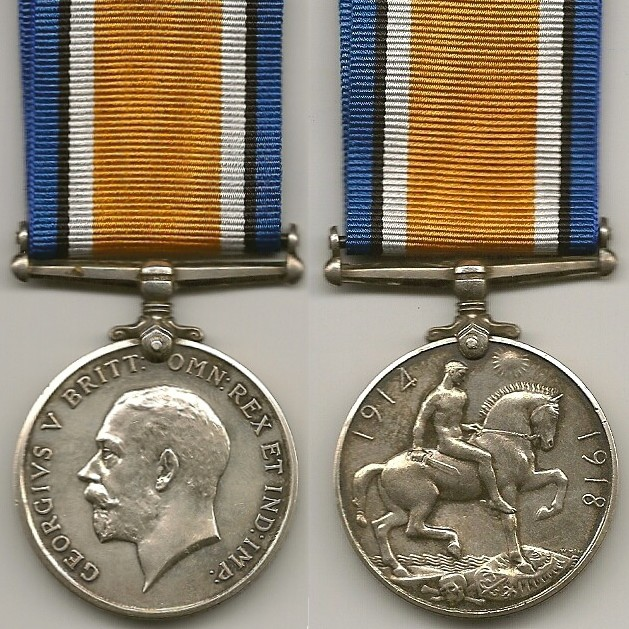
British War Medal For those who rendered service between 5 August 1914 and 11 November 1918

=== 1916 ===
17 December

Royal Guernsey Light Infantry established. (Royal Guernsey Militia suspended for the duration of the war)
Most men from the Militia volunteered to join the RGLI, others including a few civilians, were conscripted.

=== 1917 ===
Training in Guernsey at Fort George, L'Ancresse and Beaucamps

1 June

To England – Bourne Park Camp near Canterbury for advanced infantry training. Forming part of 202nd Brigade, 67th Division.

July

2nd (Reserve) Battalion formed to receive recruits and train them as replacements for casualties in the 1st Battalion RGLI.

September

Soldiers sent on a final leave

26 September

The RGLI 1st Service Battalion (44 Officers and 964 other ranks) boarded trains to Southampton and onwards to France.
2 Officers and 53 other ranks returned to Guernsey to join the 2nd Battalion, too young, too old or unfit for France.

27 September

Land at Le Havre and travel by Forty-and-eights train to Stoke Camp, Proven.

October

RGLI take their place in 86th Brigade, part of the 29th Division

9–14 October

Battle of Poelcappelle (Part of Third Battle of Ypres, or ‘Passchendaele’). After this, rest and training for Cambrai.

October–November

Training for planned Battle of Cambrai with Tanks.

20 November – 3 December

Battle of Cambrai, where the RGLI's role was to go through the Hindenburg Line after the first wave and take 'Nine Wood' to the north of Marcoing. This went according to plan, with few casualties and they then moved into Marcoing and on to the front line at Masnières. The Guernseymen found themselves defending the small town of Les Rues Vertes against a huge and determined German counter-attacks on 30 November, pushed back they retook the village twice in heavy hand to hand fighting that lasted two days. They suffered heavy casualties, with nearly 40% of the regiment either killed, injured or missing during the battle, but only withdrew when ordered to by the high command.
A number of the wounded found themselves returned to Guernsey, to be cared for at the Victoria Military Hospital in Amherst or the Convalescent Hospital at Les Touillets, Castel.
After this, rest, refitting, training and a search for replacements. The shortage of men available from Guernsey resulted in the RGLI entering 1918 with 50% of the men being non-Guernsey born.

=== 1918 ===
18–26 January

RGLI went back into the front line at Sint-Jan (north east of Ypres). After this, work parties, training.

8–29 March

In battle zone, taking turns in the front line at Poelcappelle.

3–7 April

In front line, Passchendaele sector. When out of the line, employed in trenching and draining.

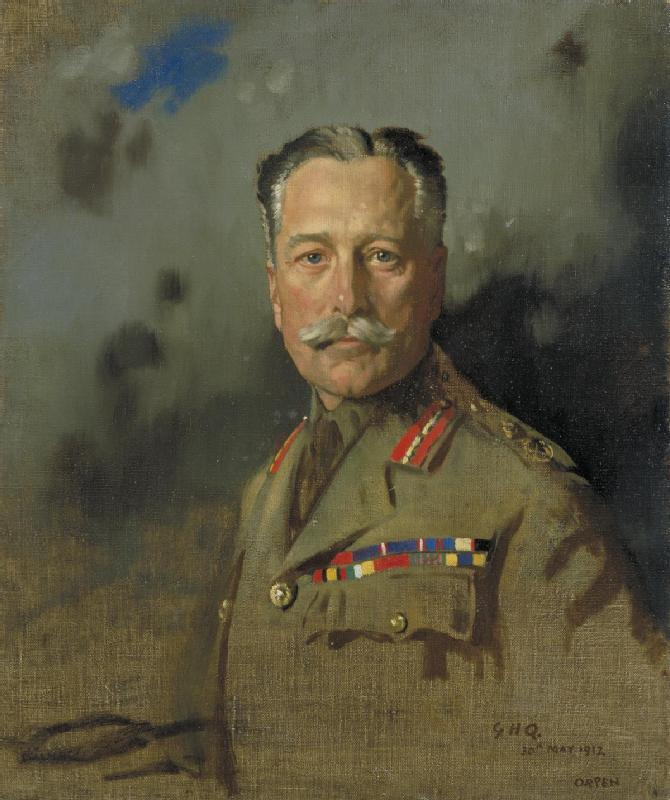
Portrait of Haig at General Headquarters, France, by Sir William Orpen, May 1917

Pulled out of the front line, the 503 officers and men were hurried by lorry to Vieux-Berquin in the Lys area where a German offensive had broken through.

10–14 April

Battle of the Lys, east of Hazebrouck. German 6th Army under Von Quast smashes 5 miles through allied lines. The RGLI is bussed south to help stem the German advance. Hopelessly outnumbered, but holding the Germans in a fighting retreat from Le Doulieu to near Merris, the Battalion suffer an appalling 80% casualties rate. The RGLI is relieved by the Australian 1st Division. Field Marshal Douglas Haig, 1st Earl Haig wrote in his despatches, which was published in the London Gazette on 21 October 1918: "After very heavy fighting, in the course of which the 1st Battalion Royal Guernsey Light Infantry, 29th Division, Major-General D.E. Cayley C.M.G. commanding the division, did gallant service....."
The fighting strength was now less than 110 officers and men.

27 April

The RGLI, withdrawn from the 29th Division and 86th Brigade, become GHQ troops well to the rear in Ecuires where they became guard troops for General Haig's H.Q. at Montreuil, Pas-de-Calais for the rest of the war and beyond. The Army headquarters was an enormous administrative body, divided into five departments staffed with a wide variety of personnel. Haig lived at a small Chateau 'Beaurepaire', 2 miles (3.2 km) SE of the town on the D138.

27 November

King George V, accompanied by Haig, made a triumphant passage through Montreuil on his way to Paris.

=== 1919 ===
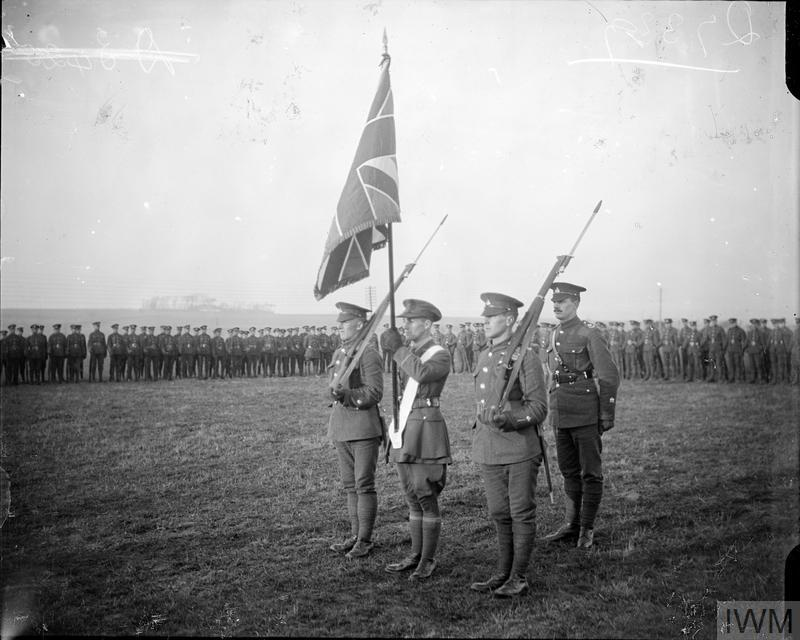
Colour Party of the Royal Guernsey Light Infantry at Montreuil, 1919

5 April

Haig leaves Montreuil and the headquarters ceases to operate as such.

21–22 May

Many of the remaining members of the RGLI sailed back to Guernsey on the "SS Lydia". They left behind 327 graves bearing their cap badge.

== Honours and awards ==
=== Orders and medals ===
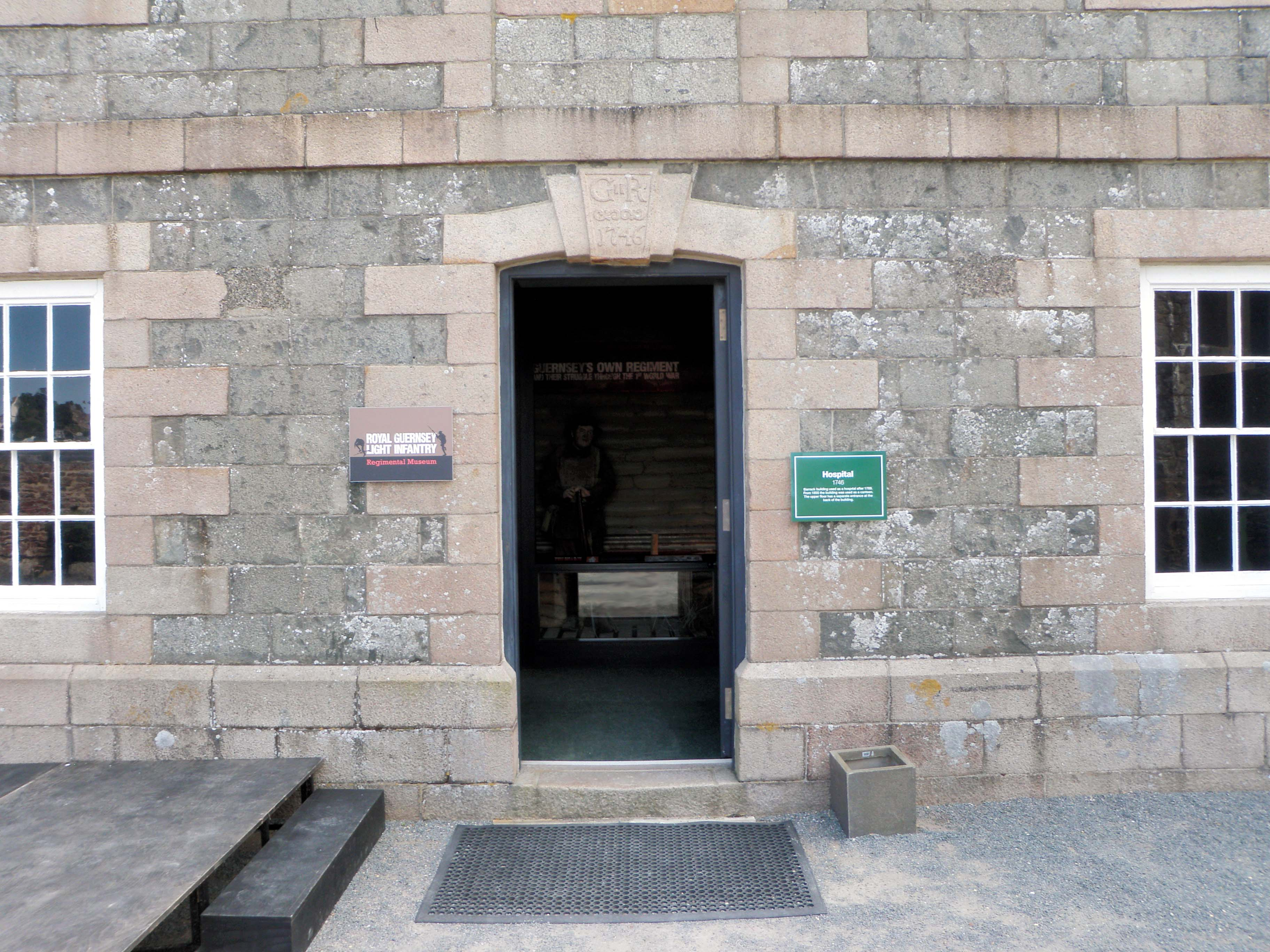
The Royal Guernsey Light Infantry Regimental Museum is located at Castle Cornet in Saint Peter Port, Guernsey

Order of St. Michael and St. George (Companion) (3rd Class)

T. L. de Havilland, Lieutenant Colonel

Royal Victorian Order (5th Class)

N. R. Ingrouille, Lieutenant

Military Cross

T, Hutchesson, Captain (T/Major)
F. de M. Laine, Lieutenant
H. A. Le Bas, Lieutenant (T/Captain)
E. J. Stone, 2nd Lieutenant
H. E. K. Stranger, 2nd Lieutenant

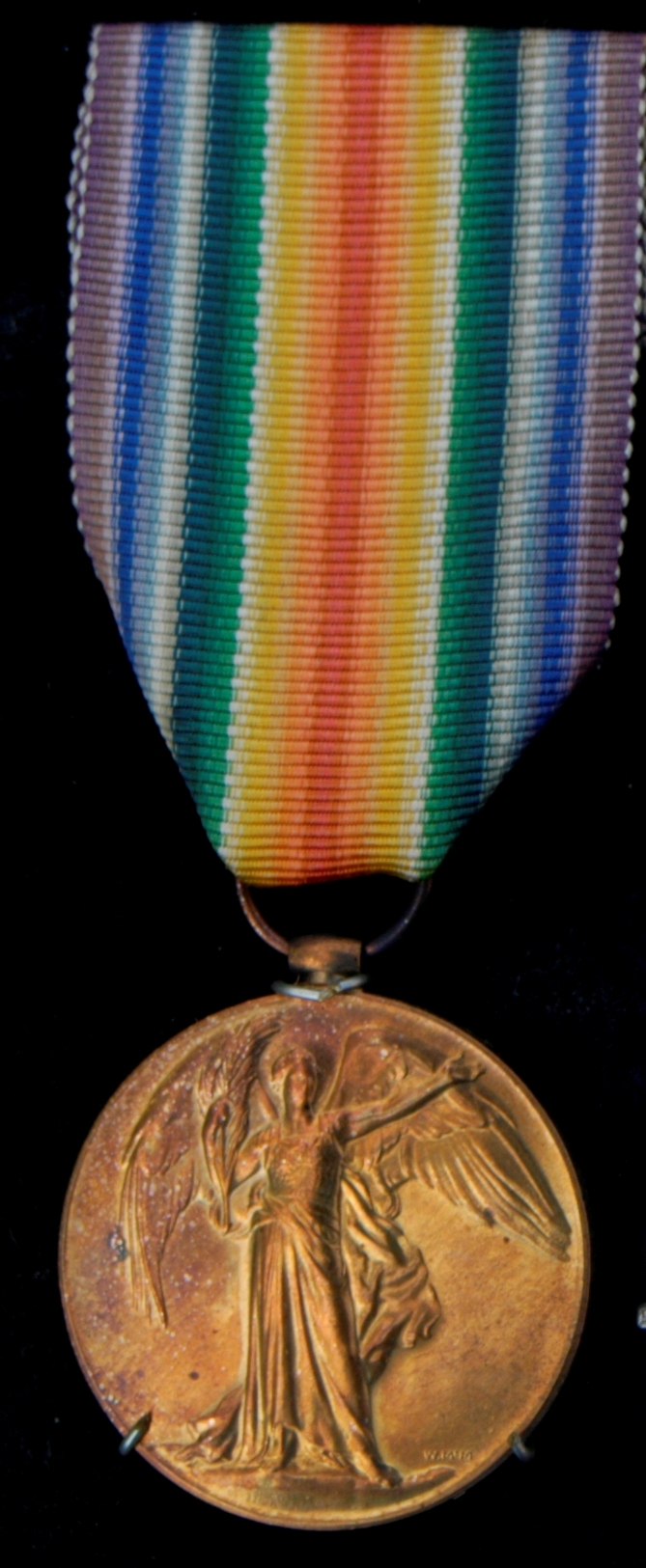
Victory Medal First World War 1914-20

Distinguished Conduct Medal

W. H. Budden, 569 Acting Sergeant
H. L. James, 586 Sergeant
W. J. Le Poidevin, 590 Sergeant

Military Medal

1249 Pte E Le Moigne, RGLI survived the war, and returned on the SS Lydia in May 1919. He had been awarded a 29th Divisional Parchment for Gallant Conduct and Devotion to Duty.
T. R. Robin, 841 Private
C. H. Yeaghers, 610 Private
J. Sealley, 843 Corporal
W. Gannicott, 335 Corporal
W. T. Gregg, 87 Private
G, Ruaux, 458 Private

Médaille militaire (France)

J. Sealley, 843 Corporal

Mentioned in Despatches
(Despatch from Sir Douglas Haig to the Secretary of State for War)

T. L. de Havilland, Lieutenant Colonel
E. A. Dorey, Lieutenant
C.W. Hockey, 438 Lance Corporal
H. Jones, Lieutenant
C. C. Machon, 226 Lance Corporal
W. T. Robinson, 1131 Lance Corporal

=== Battle Honours ===
In February 1925, in accordance with General Order No 5034 The London Gazette published a complete list of Battle Honours awarded for the Great War.

In General Orders, 1928, "Honours awarded to Militia Corps for services previous to the Great War shall pass to the reconstituted Militia Regiment and shall be emblazoned on all Regimental Standards, Guidons or Colours"

Following the disbandment of the Royal Guernsey Light Infantry in 1919, the 1st Battalion Royal Guernsey Militia were granted the following Battle Honours:

- Ypres 1917 (for militia men serving with Royal Irish regiments)
- Passchendaele
- Cambrai 1917
- Lys
- Estaires
- Hazebrouck
- France and Flanders 1917–1918.

The Colours of the RGLI are hung in the Town Church, Guernsey

== Poetry ==
See ye Masnières canal a'flood
And where yon green graves lay?
There Norman warriors fled to their God
Ne'er more to glimpse the day.
But writ there, first, a name in blood-
Norman Ten Hundred.

At Doulieu, the night birds flit
Across yon blue-grey water.
And at dusk ghost warriors sit-
Wraiths of a fearsome slaughter.
There too in blood the name is writ-
Norman Ten Hundred.

And thus there the battle's flame
Laid men out fast and low,
So young Sarnia died, but Fame
Cast o'er their graves its glow,
And honours wove about the name
Norman Ten Hundred.

(From Blicq, A Stanley, Norman Ten Hundred, Guernsey Press, 1920)

== Commemoration ==
The Royal Guernsey Light Infantry Charitable Trust was formed in 2016 to commemorate the regiment. Its joint patrons are Lt Governor Vice Admiral Sir Ian Corder and the Bailiff of Guernsey, Richard McMahon. Memorials were placed at Les Rues Vertes, France and St Peter Port, Guernsey on the centenary of key RGLI events in 2017 & 2018.

St Peter Port twinned with the town of Masnières in 2019.

== See also ==
- Royal Guernsey Militia
- Royal Militia of the Island of Jersey
