= Melissa King assault case =

2003 assault case in Cleveland, Ohio

On May 1, 2003, Melissa King, a thirteen-year-old student at Wilbur Wright Middle School in Cleveland, Ohio, was assaulted by eighteen youths aged between eight and fifteen. Although King was targeted following a personal feud with another student at the school, it was determined that the attack was also racially motivated, having occurred on "May Day" (unrelated to the solstice celebration of the same name or Labor Day), an informal commemorative day observed by some African American communities in Cleveland, on which black children hold a custom of "Beat up a White Kid" day, although the spread of this practice has been disputed. At juvenile court, six of the attackers were convicted on assault charges. Defense lawyers contended and prosecutors acknowledged that the attack sprang primarily from a personal vendetta between King and one girl, the judge ruled that May Day did exist, that the victim was attacked because she was white, and that the attack was done to uphold the May Day tradition.

== Assault ==
On May 1, 2003, school officials and students at Wilbur Wright Middle School separately notified police that "a large fight" was planned for after school near the intersection of Almira Avenue and West 110th street in Cleveland's West Boulevard neighborhood. Initially, it was believed that police arrived as the attack was under way. At the time Cleveland was a racial hotbed and some kids in the Cleveland area held the tradition that May 1 was "Beat Up A White Kid" day.

Two police cars were there prior to the attack and when school let out, they saw a large group of black and Hispanic students, twelve girls and six boys, walking in the street on West 110th. From their squad cars, the police warned them to walk on the sidewalk. Some of the students moved to block the police cars as part of the pre-planned attack.

With the police kept at a distance, the students began to run towards Melissa King, a 13-year-old white girl, who was walking home with two friends. On reaching King, one girl grabbed King's hair from behind and yanked her to the ground. The youths, seventeen of whom were students at Wilbur Wright, proceeded to beat, kick, and choke King as she was being held down.

By the time police broke up the attack, King had suffered serious injuries to her head, arms, face, neck, back, and an eye and experienced dizziness and blackouts that her mother claimed required repeated visits to the hospital.

Defense lawyers and prosecutors both agreed that the attack sprang from a personal vendetta between King and one girl. This girl testified that King had overheard her talking to a school counselor after she was sexually abused and attempted suicide, and claimed King had spread gossip about this. Within a few days of the attack, Wilbur Wright school responded by suspending five of the eighteen attackers from school for ten days.

== Aftermath ==
When the attack was publicized a day later in The Plain Dealer, more than 100 readers contacted the newspaper to confirm that the May Day ritual had been practiced for years. Many in their 20s recalled staying home sick from school on May Day in the 1990s or hurrying home to avoid getting hurt. Some teachers did not give homework that day because they knew attendance would be down. Although annual assaults on white children by minorities is rooted in certain public schools on Cleveland's West Side, the event may have multiple origins. For example, one man recalled that when he served in the military, many of his friends reported, participated in, or became victims of this annual ritual.

In June 2003, the juvenile justice unit of the Cuyahoga County prosecutor's office filed felonious assault and aggravated riot juvenile charges against the eighteen attackers. Stating that the attack was some sort of May Day ritual with the "focus to beat up a white kid," the juvenile justice unit also charged the attackers with ethnic intimidation—a hate-crimes law.

In July, Cuyahoga County Juvenile Court Judge Joseph F. Russo entered not guilty pleas and appointed lawyers for the youth, and issued arrest warrants for the four who failed to attend the court hearing.

Judge Russo ended the trial in October 2003 with six convictions. These six individuals admitted aggravated rioting, and two of those admitted to felonious assault. Judge Russo said that testimony from prosecution witnesses, including King, was too conflicting, inconsistent and sometimes obviously false to prove the culpability of four defendants beyond reasonable doubt.

He also concluded that "based on the evidence I've heard, May Day is reality and the evidence was overwhelming that this was an attack based on May Day and that the victim was chosen because she was white." In drawing his conclusion, Judge Russo suggested that white students in Cleveland's integrated public schools have reason to fear assaults by minorities in so-called May Day attacks every May 1.

== See also ==
- Kill Haole Day
- Hate crime laws in the United States
