= Cecil Bingham =

British Army officer during World War I

Major-General The Honourable Sir Cecil Bingham GCVO KCMG CB
- Born: 7 December 1861; London, England
- Died: 31 May 1934 (aged 72)
- Spouse(s): Rose Ellinor Guthrie (m. 1884; died 1908) Alys Elizabeth Carr (m. 1911)
- Relatives: Sir Francis Bingham (brother)
- Military career
- Allegiance: United Kingdom
- Branch: British Army
- Rank: Major-General
- Commands: 2nd Cavalry Brigade; 4th Cavalry Brigade; 1st Cavalry Division; Cavalry Corps; 73rd Division; 67th (2nd Home Counties) Division
- Conflicts: Second Boer War; First World War
- Awards: Knight Grand Cross of the Royal Victorian Order; Knight Commander of the Order of St Michael and St George; Companion of the Order of the Bath

Major-General Sir Cecil Edward Bingham GCVO KCMG CB (7 December 1861 – 31 May 1934) was a British Army officer who held high command during World War I.

== Early military career ==
The son of Charles Bingham, 4th Earl of Lucan, Bingham was commissioned as a lieutenant into the 3rd The King's Own Hussars in September 1882 and transferred to the 2nd Regiment of Life Guards in 1886 and the 1st Regiment of Life Guards in 1892. He served in the Second Boer War in 1900 as aide-de-camp to Major-General John French, commanding the Cavalry division.

After returning home, he became senior aide-de-camp to the Duke of Connaught during his Indian Tour in 1903. Promoted to brevet colonel in November 1906, and lieutenant colonel a month later, he was, after being appointed as a Commander of the Royal Victorian Order (CVO) in June 1909, promoted to temporary brigadier general and appointed as general officer commanding (GOC) of the 2nd Cavalry Brigade in succession to Brigadier General Hew Dalrymple Fanshawe in November 1910 and commander of the 4th Cavalry Brigade in November 1911.

== First World War ==
Bingham entered the First World War, still as GOC of the 4th Cavalry Brigade. His brigade, consisting of units like the 6th Dragoon Guards and 3rd Hussars, was part of the original British Expeditionary Force (BEF) that arrived in France in August 1914. Under his leadership, the brigade was heavily involved in the mobile warfare of that first year, including the Battle of Mons, the Battle of Le Cateau, the First Battle of the Marne and the First Battle of the Aisne.

He became GOC of the 1st Cavalry Division from May 1915, three months after being promoted to major general. During his tenure, the division participated in the Second Battle of Ypres, where cavalrymen often had to serve as dismounted infantry.

In October he was promoted to the temporary rank of lieutenant general and became GOC of the Cavalry Corps in France, relinquishing his temporary rank of lieutenant general and his command in March 1916 in order to take over command of the reserve centre at Ripon, North Yorkshire.

In November 1916 he was appointed to command 73rd Division, a formation composed of Home Service men of the Territorial Force, which was stationed in Essex and Hertfordshire for coastal defence. He relinquished this command in April 1917, and was transferred to take command of the 67th (2nd Home Counties) Division. He held this command until the division was disbanded in 1919.

== Family ==
In 1884 he married Rose Ellinor Guthrie, daughter of James Alexander Guthrie, 4th Baron of Craigie; she died 18 September 1908. They had three children:

- Lieutenant-Colonel Ralph Charles Bingham, DSO, Coldstream Guards, born 15 April 1885.
- Lieutenant David Cecil Bingham, Coldstream Guards, born 18 March 1887, killed in action in France 14 September 1914.
- Cecilia Mary Lavinia Bingham, born 19 April 1893, married Colonel Frederick George Beaumont-Nesbitt, Grenadier Guards and died 26 August 1920.

In 1911 he married Alys Elizabeth Carr, formerly Mrs Samuel Sloane Chauncey, of New York City, daughter of Col. Henry Montgomery Carr, of Louisville, Kentucky, USA.

== Honours ==
Bingham was appointed a Companion of the Order of the Bath (CB) in the 1914 Birthday Honours, a Knight Commander of the Order of St Michael and St George (KCMG) in the 1918 New Year Honours for War services, and promoted to Knight Grand Cross of the Royal Victorian Order (GCVO) in the 1928 Birthday Honours.

He was awarded the Croix de Commander of the French Legion of Honour in 1916.

Military offices
Preceded by James Young	GOC 67th (2nd Home Counties) Division; 1917−1919	Succeeded by Post disbanded
