= SS Orteric (1910) =

Coordinates: 32.30°N 25.30°E

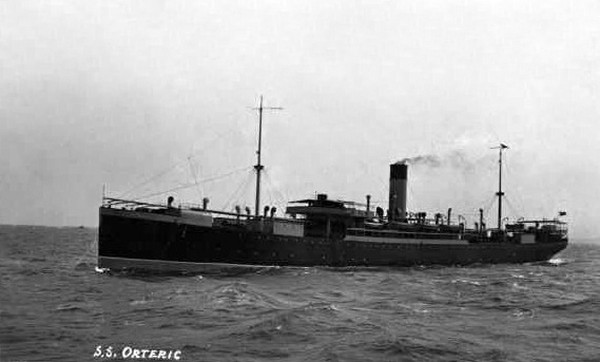
- Orteric in about 1911–13

History

United Kingdom
- Name: Orteric
- Owner: Andrew Weir & Co
- Operator: Bank Line
- Port of registry: Glasgow
- Builder: Russell & Co, Port Glasgow
- Yard number: 607
- Launched: 19 December 1910
- Completed: January 1911
- Identification: UK official number 129534; code letters HSCV; call sign GLE
- Fate: Shelled and torpedoed 9 December 1915

General characteristics
- Type: cargo and passenger ship
- Tonnage: 6,535 GRT, 4,105 NRT
- Length: 460.0 ft (140.2 m)
- Beam: 57.0 ft (17.4 m)
- Draught: 31 ft 6 in (9.6 m)
- Depth: 28.9 ft (8.8 m)
- Decks: 2
- Installed power: 690 NHP
- Propulsion: triple expansion engine
- Speed: 13 knots (24 km/h)

SS Orteric was a Bank Line cargo and passenger steamship that was built in Scotland in 1910–11 and sunk by a U-boat in the Mediterranean Sea in 1915. In 1911 she took 960 Spanish and 565 Portuguese migrants to Hawaii to work on the sugar plantations.

She was the first of two Bank Line ships that were called Orteric. The second was built in England in 1919 for the United Kingdom Shipping Controller as War Coral. Andrew Weir & Co bought her and renamed her Orteric. She was wrecked in 1922.

== Building ==
Russell & Co of Port Glasgow on the Firth of Clyde built Orteric for Andrew Weir & Co. She was launched on 19 December 1910 and completed in January 1911. Her registered length was 460.0 ft (140.2 m), her beam was 57.0 ft (17.4 m) and her depth was 28.9 ft (8.8 m). Her tonnages were 6,535 GRT and 4,105 NRT. She had a three-cylinder triple expansion engine that was built by Rankin and Blackmore of Greenock. It developed 690 NHP and gave her a cruising speed of 13 knots (24 km/h).

Andrew Weir & Co registered Orteric in Glasgow. Her United Kingdom official number was 129534 and her code letters were HSCV. She was equipped for wireless telegraphy, and her call sign was GLE.

== Migrant ship ==
In 1911 Orteric took 960 Spanish and 565 Portuguese migrants to Hawaii to work as contract labour in the sugar cane plantations. This made her the last ship to take part in the Portuguese immigration to Hawaii of 1878–1911, and the second ship to take part in the Spanish immigration that followed. The Spanish immigrants, who were mostly from the area of Seville, embarked at Gibraltar, and the Portuguese embarked at Porto and Lisbon.

Orteric left Gibraltar on 24 February 1911 and reached Hawaii on 12 April 1911 after 48 days at sea. Hawaiian newspapers reported that the two groups argued and fought with each other on the long voyage, "so much so that they had to be separated. The women... went as far as hair pulling." There was an outbreak of measles on the voyage that caused 58 deaths, most of them children.

== Loss ==
In December 1915 Orteric was carrying about 10,000 tons of sodium nitrate from Antofagasta, Chile, to Alexandria, Egypt. At about 1620 hrs on 9 December she was in the Mediterranean Sea off the coast of Cyrenaica when she sighted the German U-boat SM U-39. Orteric's master, Captain McGill, attempted evasive manoeuvres, but U-39's commander, KptLt Walther Forstmann, opened fire with his 88mm deck gun. At least four shells hit Orteric. One killed a member of her Chinese crew, and another destroyed her wireless.

Orteric raised a white flag in surrender, and her crew began to launch her lifeboats, but U-39 kept firing. A shell hit one of the boats, killing a second member of her Chinese crew and wounding another four. Her crew successfully launched her remaining three lifeboats, but left behind Captain McGill, the third officer, the second engineer and the wireless officer. The four officers then abandoned ship in a small emergency boat. U-39 then came within about 200 ft (61 m) of Orteric and fired a torpedo at her. Orteric sank within about five minutes, about 140 miles south by east of the island of Gavdos.

The U-boat crew then detained Orteric's emergency boat and ordered Captain McGill to board U-39. KptLt Forstmann ordered McGill to sign something in a book, which McGill did not understand as it was in German. McGill was then released to return to the emergency boat. The four lifeboats kept together, and a few hours later a British hospital ship rescued their occupants.

== Bibliography ==
- Lloyd's Register of Shipping. Vol. I. London: Lloyd's Register of Shipping. 1914.
- The Marconi Press Agency Ltd (1914). The Year Book of Wireless Telegraphy and Telephony. London: The Marconi Press Agency Ltd.
