= 202nd (2/1st Kent) Brigade =

2nd Kent Brigade 202nd (2/1st Kent) Brigade 202nd Brigade
- Active: October 1914 – 17 March 1919
- Country: United Kingdom
- Branch: British Army
- Type: Infantry
- Size: Brigade
- Part of: 67th (2nd Home Counties) Division
- Service: World War I

The 2nd Kent Brigade was a 2nd Line Territorial Force Brigade of the British Army in World War I. The brigade was formed as a duplicate of the Kent Brigade in October 1914 as part of the 2nd Home Counties Division. As the name suggests, the brigade recruited in Kent. In August 1915, in common with all Territorial Force brigades, it was numbered as 202nd (2/1st Kent) Brigade. Between September 1917 and the end of the year, the brigade was extensively reorganized and lost its territorial identity; henceforth it was known as 202nd Brigade.

== History ==
In accordance with the Territorial and Reserve Forces Act 1907 (7 Edw.7, c.9) which brought the Territorial Force into being, the TF was intended to be a home defence force for service during wartime and members could not be compelled to serve outside the country. However, on the outbreak of war on 4 August 1914, many members volunteered for Imperial Service. Therefore, TF units were split into 1st Line (liable for overseas service) and 2nd Line (home service for those unable or unwilling to serve overseas) units. 2nd Line units performed the home defence role, although in fact most of these were also posted abroad in due course.

The Brigade served on home defence duties throughout the war, whilst recruiting, training and supplying drafts to overseas units and formations. It was twice warned to prepare to be transferred to Ireland, and in April 1917 for service on the Western Front, but in the event never left England. It was eventually disbanded in March 1919.

== Order of battle ==
The composition of 202nd Brigade was as follows:

- 2/4th Battalion, Buffs (East Kent Regiment) – disbanded November 1917
- 2/5th Battalion, Buffs (East Kent Regiment) – disbanded November 1917
- 2/5th Battalion, Queen's Own (Royal West Kent Regiment) – disbanded November 1917
- 3/4th Battalion, Queen's Own (Royal West Kent Regiment) – formed June 1915, to Western Front 1 June 1917
- 1st (Service) Battalion, Royal Guernsey Light Infantry – joined by May 1917, to Western Front September 1917
- 284th Graduated Battalion, became 51st (Graduated) Battalion, King's Royal Rifle Corps – joined 17 September 1917
- 286th Graduated Battalion, became 52nd (Graduated) Battalion, Gordon Highlanders – joined 17 September 1917
- 2/5th Battalion, Suffolk Regiment – joined 18 September 1917, disbanded April 1918
- 285th Graduated Battalion, became 52nd (Graduated) Battalion, King's Royal Rifle Corps – joined 24 September 1917
- 52nd (Graduated) Battalion, Rifle Brigade – joined February 1918

== See also ==
- British infantry brigades of the First World War

== Bibliography ==
- Maj A.F. Becke,History of the Great War: Order of Battle of Divisions, Part 2b: The 2nd-Line Territorial Force Divisions (57th–69th), with the Home-Service Divisions (71st–73rd) and 74th and 75th Divisions, London: HM Stationery Office, 1937/Uckfield: Naval & Military Press, 2007, ISBN 1-847347-39-8.
- Brig E.A. James, British Regiments 1914–18, London: Samson Books, 1978/Uckfield: Naval & Military Press, 2001, ISBN 978-1-84342-197-9.
