= 201st (2/1st Middlesex) Brigade =

2nd Middlesex Brigade 201st (2/1st Middlesex) Brigade 201st Brigade
- Active: October 1914 – 17 March 1919
- Country: United Kingdom
- Branch: British Army
- Type: Infantry
- Size: Brigade
- Part of: 67th (2nd Home Counties) Division
- Service: World War I

The 2nd Middlesex Brigade was a 2nd Line Territorial Force Brigade of the British Army in World War I. The brigade was formed as a duplicate of the Middlesex Brigade in October 1914 as part of the 2nd Home Counties Division. As the name suggests, the brigade recruited in Middlesex. In August 1915, in common with all Territorial Force brigades, it was numbered as 201st (2/1st Middlesex) Brigade. Between September 1917 and the end of the year, the brigade was extensively reorganized and lost its territorial identity; henceforth it was known as 201st Brigade.

== History ==
In accordance with the Territorial and Reserve Forces Act 1907 (7 Edw.7, c.9) which brought the Territorial Force into being, the TF was intended to be a home defence force for service during wartime and members could not be compelled to serve outside the country. However, on the outbreak of war on 4 August 1914, many members volunteered for Imperial Service. Therefore, TF units were split into 1st Line (liable for overseas service) and 2nd Line (home service for those unable or unwilling to serve overseas) units. 2nd Line units performed the home defence role, although in fact most of these were also posted abroad in due course.

The Brigade served on home defence duties throughout the war, whilst recruiting, training and supplying drafts to overseas units and formations. It was twice warned to prepare to be transferred to Ireland, and in April 1917 for service on the Western Front, but in the event never left England. It was eventually disbanded in March 1919.

== Order of battle ==
The composition of 201st Brigade was as follows:

- 2/7th Battalion, Duke of Cambridge's Own (Middlesex Regiment) – left for Gibraltar 1 February 1915
- 2/8th Battalion, Duke of Cambridge's Own (Middlesex Regiment) – left for Gibraltar 1 February 1915
- 2/9th Battalion, Duke of Cambridge's Own (Middlesex Regiment) – disbanded November 1917
- 2/10th Battalion, Duke of Cambridge's Own (Middlesex Regiment) – left 24 April 1915, later to Gallipoli
- 3/7th Battalion, Duke of Cambridge's Own (Middlesex Regiment) – formed February 1915, became 2/7th Bn June 1916, disbanded November 1917
- 3/8th Battalion, Duke of Cambridge's Own (Middlesex Regiment) – formed February 1915, became 2/8th Bn June 1916, disbanded October 1917
- 3/10th Battalion, Duke of Cambridge's Own (Middlesex Regiment) – formed May 1915, to Western Front 1 June 1917
- 4th (Extra Reserve) Battalion, South Staffordshire Regiment – joined June 1917, to Western Front 10 October 1917
- 201st Trench Mortar Battery – formed by June 1917
- 280th Graduated Battalion, became 51st (Graduated) Battalion, Hampshire Regiment – joined 24 September 1917
- 281st Graduated Battalion, became 52nd (Graduated) Battalion, Hampshire Regiment – joined 24 September 1917
- 282nd Graduated Battalion, became 52nd (Graduated) Battalion, South Wales Borderers – joined 24 September 1917
- 2/7th Battalion, Essex Regiment – joined 10 October 1917, disbanded March 1918
- 52nd (Graduated) Battalion, Rifle Brigade (Prince Consort's Own) – joined 22 February 1918

== See also ==
- British infantry brigades of the First World War

== Bibliography ==
- Maj A.F. Becke,History of the Great War: Order of Battle of Divisions, Part 2b: The 2nd-Line Territorial Force Divisions (57th–69th), with the Home-Service Divisions (71st–73rd) and 74th and 75th Divisions, London: HM Stationery Office, 1937/Uckfield: Naval & Military Press, 2007, ISBN 1-847347-39-8.
- Brig E.A. James, British Regiments 1914–18, London: Samson Books, 1978/Uckfield: Naval & Military Press, 2001, ISBN 978-1-84342-197-9.
