= James Young (British Army officer) =

British Army general

Major-General James Young CB
- Young in 1918
- Born: James Charles Young; 1858
- Died: 1926 (aged 67–68)
- Military career
- Branch: British Army
- Rank: Major-General
- Commands: 2nd Bn, the Royal Sussex Regiment; 7th Ferozepore Brigade; 4th Rawalpindi Brigade; Home Counties Division; 2nd Home Counties Division
- Conflicts: Second Boer War; First World War
- Awards: Companion of the Order of the Bath

Major-General James Charles Young CB (1858–1926) was a British Army officer.

== Military career ==
Young was commissioned into the 35th (Royal Sussex) Regiment of Foot on 11 November 1876. He saw action in the Anglo–Egyptian War in 1882 and the Nile Expedition in 1884. He then became Deputy Assistant Adjutant General in South Africa in 1892 and commanding officer of the 2nd Battalion, the Royal Sussex Regiment in South Africa in 1899 and fought in the Second Boer War.

He relinquished command of the battalion in February 1903 and was placed on half-pay and promoted to colonel.

He went on to be assistant adjutant general of the 4th (Quetta) Division in 1904, general officer commanding (GOC) of the 7th Ferozepore Brigade in November 1907, for which he was promoted to temporary brigadier general whilst he held this position, and commander of the 4th Rawalpindi Brigade in February 1909.

After that Young became GOC of the Home Counties Division of the Territorial Force (TF) in October 1912.

He accompanied his division on its journey, departing from Southampton on 30 October 1914 for India; however on arrival in Bombay on 1 December 1914, he handed over the units and returned to England, arriving on 22 December. He took command of the 2nd Line 2nd Home Counties Division on 20 January 1915. He then retired from the army in April 1917.

He was colonel of the Royal Sussex Regiment from 1914 to 1926.

== Sources ==
- Becke, Archibald F. (1937). Order of Battle of Divisions Part 2B. The 2nd-Line Territorial Force Divisions (57th–69th) with The Home-Service Divisions (71st–73rd) and 74th and 75th Divisions. London: HMSO. OCLC 4405016.

Military offices
Preceded by Charles Townshend	GOC Home Counties Division; 1912–1914	Succeeded by Division broken up in India
Preceded by Walter Rees Clifford (acting)	GOC 67th (2nd Home Counties) Division; 1915−1917	Succeeded by Cecil Bingham
