= Kamaʻāina =

Hawaii residents regardless of racial background

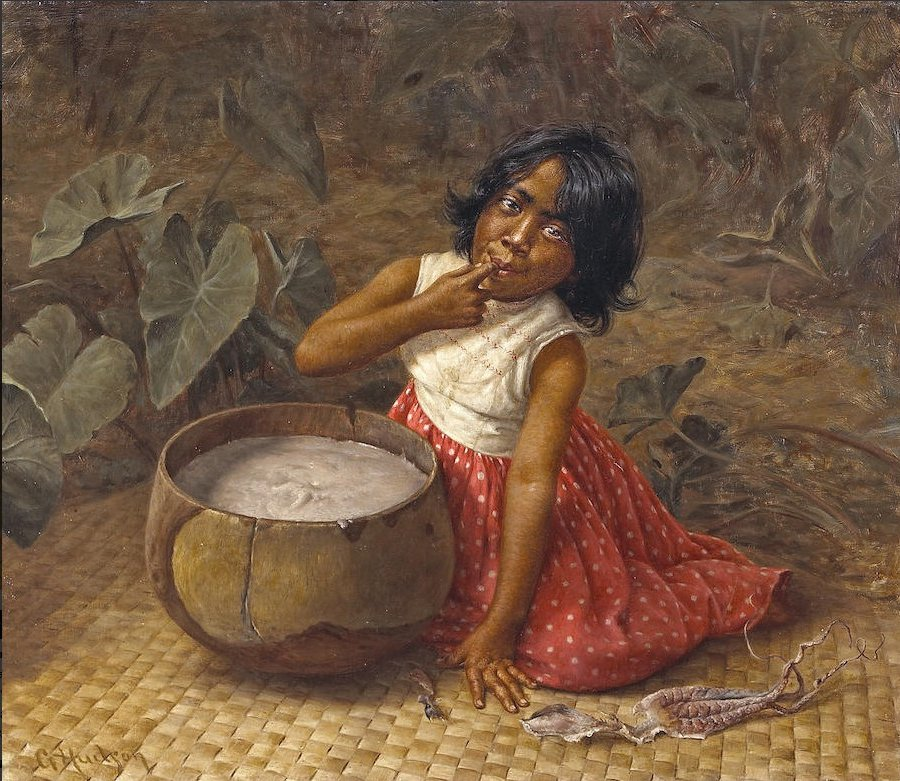
A Kamaʻāina by Grace Hudson

Kamaʻāina (lit. 'child or person of the land') is a Hawaiian-language word used to describe Hawaii residents, and particularly those born in Hawaii. The word is generally applied regardless of the person's racial background; this is contrasted with the word kanaka, which specifically means a person of Native Hawaiian ancestry. The word kamaʻāina may be used to describe only persons who live in Hawaii, or it may be expanded to include people who were born there and moved away.

One of the most frequent uses of the term is in the "kamaʻāina rate", a discount given by local businesses to residents. These discounts are offered primarily at restaurants, hotels, and tourist attractions. Merchants generally offer these "kamaʻāina discounts" to anyone with a local ID, such as a Hawai'i driver's license or local military ID.

There is a statewide job placement program, founded in 1998 and sponsored by the Hawaii Island Economic Development Board, called "Kamaʻaina Come Home". The initiative is intended to increase the state's labor pool by inducing Hawaii college students and former residents who are now living in the continental United States to return to Hawaii.

== See also ==
- Haole
