= SS Heliopolis (1907) =

British passenger ship

SS Heliopolis/SS Royal George
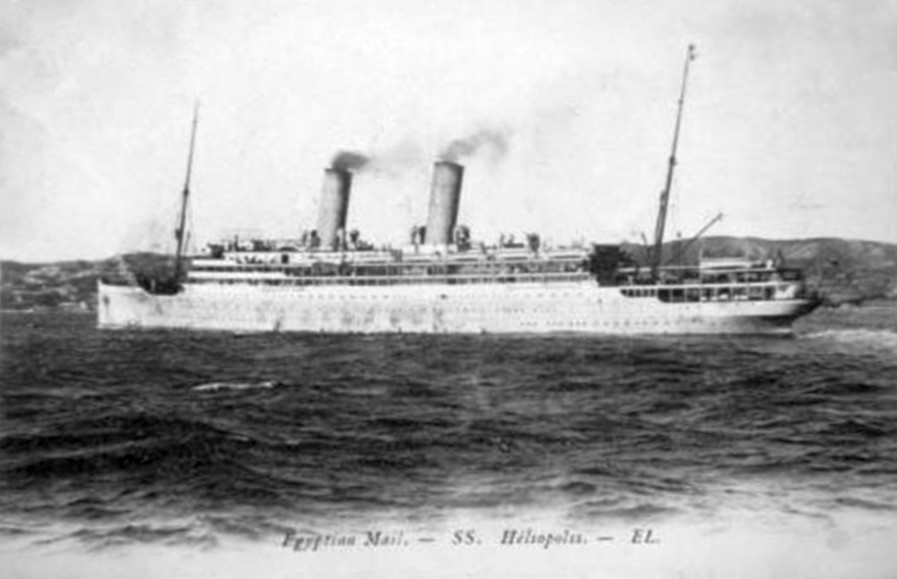
- Heliopolis circa 1907–10 from an Egyptian Mail Co. postcard.

History

United Kingdom, Canada
- Name: Heliopolis
- Namesake: Heliopolis, Ancient Egypt
- Owner: Egyptian Mail Company; (1907–10)
- Operator: (United Kingdom) Egyptian Mail Company; (1907–10); (Canada) Canadian Northern Steamships; (1910–14); (Canada) Canadian Expeditionary Force; (1914); (United Kingdom of Great Britain and Ireland) Royal Navy (troop ship); (1915–19); (United Kingdom) Cunard Line (1919–22)
- Builder: Fairfield Shipbuilding & Engineering, Govan, Glasgow
- Yard number: 449
- Launched: 27 March 1907
- In service: 1907–1922
- Renamed: 1910 as Royal George
- Fate: Scrapped 1922 at Wilhelmshaven

General characteristics
- Type: Passenger steamship
- Tonnage: 11,146 GRT
- Length: 525.8 feet (160.3 m)
- Beam: 60.2 feet (18.3 m)
- Speed: 19 knots (35 km/h)
- Capacity: 1,154 passengers

SS Heliopolis was a Clyde-built British passenger ship. She was subsequently renamed in 1910 SS Royal George, and served as a troop ship for the Canadian Expeditionary Force during the First World War.

Heliopolis was built in 1907 by the Fairfield Shipbuilding and Engineering Companyof Govan, Glasgow, Scotland and launched on 28 May 1907 for the British-owned Egyptian Mail Company. She was a 11,146 GRT ship with a length of 525.8 feet (160.3 m), a beam 60.2 feet (18.3 m), two funnels, two masts, and a triple-screw propulsion that gave a cruising speed of 19 knots (35 km/h).

The Heliopolis, operated in the Mediterranean between Marseille and Alexandria, with accommodation for 344 First Class, 210 Second Class, and 560 Third Class passengers, giving a total capacity of 1,157 passengers. She continued until 1909, when the Egyptian Mail Company deemed her unprofitable and dry-docked her in Marseille to be offered for sale.

In 1910 the Canadian Northern Steamship Company of Toronto bought the ship and renamed her Royal George. She then did passenger service in the North Atlantic commencing on 26 May 1910 with the Avonmouth – Quebec City – Montreal route. She ran aground on 6 November 1912 attempting to put in at Quebec, but was salvaged and after repairs returned to service on 17 June 1913.

== World War I service ==
The Royal George was taken over by the Canadian military when the First World War began, and sailed on 3 October 1914 from Gaspé Bay, Quebec for Plymouth, England with the Canadian Expeditionary Force. In 1915 she served in the Gallipoli campaign, and through the remainder of the war served as a UK troop ship. Royal George was returned at the end of the war to Cunard Line, which in 1916 had bought the entire fleet of Canadian Northern Steamships.

== Post-War service ==
Royal George resumed passenger service on 10 February 1919, first between Liverpool, Halifax, Nova Scotia and New York, and later between Southampton, Halifax and New York. After nine voyages with the Cunard Line, she was retired in 1920 and used as a depot ship at Cherbourg Harbour in France to process emigrants, before finally being scrapped in 1922 at Wilhelmshaven, Germany.

== See also ==
- Spanish immigration to Hawaii. There were two S.S.Heliopolis. This S.S. Heliopolis was launched on 10 May 1907, two months after the first S.S. Heliopolis embarked from Malaga, Spain. The first S.S. Heliopolis was constructed in 1906 in Cardiff. The following information was taken from Lloyd's list movement reports. The ship left Cardiff on 3 March 1907 arriving in Malaga Spain on 7 March 1907. On 10 March, the shipped passed Gibraltar westbound. On 4 April 1907 it arrived in Punta Arena (Sandy Point), Chile, arriving in Honolulu on 26 Apr 1907. It departed Honolulu on 3 May and arrived in Hong Kong on 22 May.

The Heliopolis immigrant ship
