= 67th (2nd Home Counties) Division =

2nd Home Counties Division 67th (2nd Home Counties) Division 67th Division
- Active: 14 November 1914 – 17 March 1919
- Country: United Kingdom
- Branch: British Army
- Type: Infantry
- Size: Division
- Service: World War I

Commanders
- Notable commanders: Major-General Hon. C.E. Bingham

The 2nd Home Counties Division was a 2nd Line Territorial Force division of the British Army in World War I. The division was formed as a duplicate of the 44th (Home Counties) Division in November 1914. As the name suggests, the division recruited in the Home Counties, particularly Kent, Middlesex, Surrey and Sussex. In August 1915, in common with all Territorial Force divisions, it was numbered as 67th (2nd Home Counties) Division. Between September 1917 and the end of the year, the division was extensively reorganized and lost its territorial identity; henceforth it was known as 67th Division.

It served on home defence duties throughout the war, whilst recruiting, training and supplying drafts to overseas units and formations. It was twice warned to prepare to be transferred to Ireland, and in April 1917 for service on the Western Front, but in the event never left England. It was eventually disbanded in March 1919.

== History ==
In accordance with the Territorial and Reserve Forces Act 1907 (7 Edw. 7, c.9) which brought the Territorial Force into being, the TF was intended to be a home defence force for service during wartime and members could not be compelled to serve outside the country. However, on the outbreak of war on 4 August 1914, many members volunteered for Imperial Service. Therefore, TF units were split into 1st Line (liable for overseas service) and 2nd Line (home service for those unable or unwilling to serve overseas) units. 2nd Line units performed the home defence role, although in fact most of these were also posted abroad in due course.

On 15 August 1915, TF units were instructed to separate home service men from those who had volunteered for overseas service (1st Line), with the home service personnel to be formed into reserve units (2nd Line). On 31 August, 2nd Line units were authorized for each 1st Line unit where more than 60% of men had volunteered for overseas service. After being organized, armed and clothed, the 2nd Line units were gradually grouped into large formations thereby forming the 2nd Line brigades and divisions. These 2nd Line units and formations had the same name and structure as their 1st Line parents. On 24 November, it was decided to replace imperial service (1st Line) formations as they proceeded overseas with their reserve (2nd Line) formations. A second reserve (3rd Line) unit was then formed at the peace headquarters of the 1st Line.

The formation of the 2nd Home Counties Division was expedited as its parent Home Counties Division had been posted to India on 30 October 1914. As a result, the division was formed in November 1914 with the 2nd Surrey, 2nd Middlesex and 2nd Kent Brigades as a 2nd Line duplicate and concentrated around Windsor. Officers and men of the 1st Line infantry battalions and artillery brigades (Note: Like an infantry battalion, an artillery brigade was usually commanded by a Lieutenant-Colonel. Artillery brigades were redesignated as regiments in 1938.) who did not go to India also joined the 2nd Line.

Throughout 1915, training was hampered by a lack of modern arms and equipment. Further complicating the situation, in July 1915, the 2nd Line units and formations became liable for overseas service and were extensively reorganized; the home service personnel were posted to home service units. Initially, the artillery were equipped with some obsolete French 90mm guns and the infantry with Japanese .256" rifles.

== Order of battle ==
=== Organisation, December 1915 ===
Organisation in December 1915 after reorganization when all 2nd Line formations became liable for overseas service.

200th (2/1st Surrey) Brigade

3/4th Battalion, Queen's (Royal West Surrey Regiment) (Note: 2/4th Battalion, Queen's (Royal West Surrey Regiment), 2/4th Battalion, Queen's Own (Royal West Kent Regiment) and 2/10th Battalion, Duke of Cambridge's Own (Middlesex Regiment) originally formed part of the division. On 24 April 1915 they were posted to 160th (Welsh Border) Brigade in 53rd (Welsh) Division, along with 1/4th Battalion, Royal Sussex Regiment, and served in Gallipoli, Egypt and Palestine. They were replaced by their 3rd Line battalions and 4th Line battalions were formed to act as reserves.)
2/5th Battalion, Queen's (Royal West Surrey Regiment)
2/5th Battalion, East Surrey Regiment
2/6th Battalion, East Surrey Regiment

Royal Artillery (Note: The division was also supported by a number of batteries of the Royal Garrison Artillery: 1/1st Home Counties (Kent) Heavy Battery, RGA (four 4.7" guns) from 30 October 1914 to 17 November 1915. It was re-equipped and left for the Western Front, landing at Le Havre on 29 December 1915. It joined the XVI Heavy Artillery Brigade on 31 December.; 2/1st Home Counties (Kent) Heavy Battery, RGA became a separate unit on 26 December 1914. It was equipped with four 4.7" guns on 10 January 1916 and was attached to the 226th Mixed Brigade at Mundesley in September 1916.; 130th Heavy Battery, RGA (four 60 pounders) was attached to the division from 19 November 1915 to 7 February 1916. It briefly served in Egypt, before joining the Fourth Army in France on 25 May.)

2/I Home Counties Brigade, RFA

2/1st Sussex Battery
2/2nd Sussex Battery
2/3rd Sussex Battery
2/I Home Counties Brigade Ammunition Column

2/II Home Counties Brigade, RFA

2/4th Sussex Battery
2/5th Sussex Battery
2/6th Sussex Battery
2/II Home Counties Brigade Ammunition Column

2/III Home Counties Brigade, RFA

2/1st Kent Battery
2/2nd Kent Battery
2/3rd Kent Battery
2/III Home Counties Brigade Ammunition Column

1/IV Home Counties (H) Brigade, RFA (Note: 1/IV Home Counties (Howitzer) Brigade, RFA was a 1st Line unit that remained in England when its parent division went to India in October 1914; it joined 67th Division in June 1915. It left on 22 December 1915 to prepare for overseas service and was replaced by its 2nd Line the next day. It was posted to the Western Front on 10 March 1916, joining the Fourth Army before transferring to the 63rd (Royal Naval) Division on 18 July 1916.)

1/4th Kent (H) Battery
1/5th Kent (H) Battery
1/IV Home Counties (H) Brigade Ammunition Column

2/1st Home Counties (Kent) Heavy Battery, RGA

Divisional troops

67th (2/1st Home Counties) Divisional Cyclist Company
67th (2/1st Home Counties) Mobile Veterinary Section, AVC

67th (2nd Home Counties) Divisional Engineers

2/1st Home Counties Field Company, Royal Engineers (later 493rd (Home Counties) Field Company)
2/2nd Home Counties Field Company, RE (later 494th (Home Counties) Field Company)
1/3rd Home Counties Field Company, RE (later 492nd (Home Counties) Field Company)
67th (2/1st Home Counties) Divisional Signal Company, RE

Royal Army Medical Corps

2/1st Home Counties Field Ambulance
2/2nd Home Counties Field Ambulance
2/3rd Home Counties Field Ambulance

67th (2/1st Home Counties) Divisional Train, ASC

545th Company
546th Company
547th Company
548th Company

201st (2/1st Middlesex) Brigade

3/7th Battalion, Duke of Cambridge's Own (Middlesex Regiment) (Note: 2/7th and 2/8th Battalions, Duke of Cambridge's Own (Middlesex Regiment) originally formed part of the division. On 1 February 1915 they were posted to Gibraltar and on 23 August joined the garrison in Egypt. Both battalions transferred to France on 9 May 1916 and were disbanded there on 15 June. At that time, 3/7th and 3/8th were redesignated as 2/7th and 2/8th. They were replaced in the division by their 3rd Line battalions and 4th Line battalions were formed to act as reserves.)
3/8th Battalion, Duke of Cambridge's Own (Middlesex Regiment)
2/9th Battalion, Duke of Cambridge's Own (Middlesex Regiment)
3/10th Battalion, Duke of Cambridge's Own (Middlesex Regiment)

202nd (2/1st Kent) Brigade

2/4th Battalion, Buffs (East Kent Regiment)
2/5th (The Weald of Kent) Battalion, Buffs (East Kent Regiment)
3/4th Battalion, Queen's Own (Royal West Kent Regiment)
2/5th Battalion, Queen's Own (Royal West Kent Regiment)

=== 1917 ===
Twice the division was ordered to prepare for service in Ireland and once (in April 1917) to prepare to join the British Expeditionary Force (BEF) in France. However, none of these moves came off, and in the end three battalions left the division and went to France independently in June 1917 to reinforce the BEF: 3/4th Queen's, 3/4th Queen's Own West Kents, and 3/10th Middlesex. Initially these were attached to 1st South African Brigade in 9th (Scottish) Division but were then distributed to other divisions. They were among the few 3rd Line TF battalions to see action during the war. They were replaced in their respective brigades of 67th Division by three Special Reserve (SR) or Militia battalions that had previously been a composite infantry brigade in Northern Command: 4th (Extra Reserve) Bn, North Staffordshire Regiment (200th), 4th (Extra Reserve) Bn, South Staffordshire Regiment (201st) and 1st (Service) Bn, Royal Guernsey Militia (202nd). These battalions also left to join the BEF in October 1917 (and were in turn among the few Militia battalions to see action).

Meanwhile the organisation of the divisional artillery had been kept up to date with current BEF practice. The four 2nd line field brigades were numbered CCCXXXV (335) to CCCXXXVIII (338) in May 1916, when the batteries were designated A, B and C in each brigade (A (H) and B (H) in the howitzer brigade). Later that year CCCXXXVIII (H) Bde was broken up and its batteries transferred to CCCXXXV and CCCXXXVI, becoming D (H) Bty in each case. In 1917 CCCXXXV Bde was broken up to bring A-C batteries of the other two brigades up to six guns instead of four. Finally on 19 November 1917 the two brigades left 67th Division and were shipped to Mesopotamia, where they became the divisional artillery for a newly-formed 18th Indian Division.

These units in 67th Divisional Artillery were replaced by two newly-formed RFA brigades re-using the numbers from disbanded Regular brigades (the numbered batteries were former Provisional units of the TF). Farndale

- XII Brigade, RFA
  - 1203rd (Lowland) Bty
  - 1204th (Northumberland) Bty
  - 1207th (Home Counties) Bty
  - D (H) Bty
- XLIII Brigade, RFA
  - 1212th (West Riding) Bty
  - A Bty
  - B Bty
  - D (H) Bty

The remaining TF battalions were replaced during November 1917 by seven 'Graduated' infantry battalions of the Training Reserve (TR): 276th, 277th and 278th Bns (200th Bde), 281st and 282nd Bns (201st Bde), 284th and 286th Bn (202nd Bde). Thus by December 1917 the character of the division had completely changed, from 2nd Line TF to training and home service units. This was recognised by the abandonment of its Territorial subtitle ('Home Counties').

=== February 1918 ===
In February 1918, 200th Brigade was demobilised and replaced by 214th Special Brigade transferred from 71st Division. This brigade had been reorganised and filled with men of A1 medical category for overseas service, with additional units attached to it for service at Murmansk as part of the North Russia Intervention. However, this move never happened and the brigade joined 67th Division after 71st Division was disbanded on 12 February 1918:

214th Special Brigade

- 2/7th Bn, Durham Light Infantry
- 16th (Home Service) Bn, Queens (Royal West Surrey)
- 252nd Machine-Gun Company, Machine-Gun Corps (MGC)
- 253rd Machine-Gun Company, MGC
- 2/1st Warwickshire Yeomanry (Cyclist)
- 2/1st Hertfordshire Yeomanry (Cyclist)
- XLIX Brigade, RFA
- 494th (Home Counties) Field Company, RE
- 71st Divisional Signal Company, RE

== Commanders ==
The 67th (2nd Home Counties) Division had the following commanders:

| From | Rank | Name |
|---|---|---|
| 14 November 1914 | Brigadier-General | C.T. Caulfield (acting) |
| 3 January 1915 | Brigadier-General | W.R. Clifford (acting) |
| 20 January 1915 | Major-General | J.C. Young (Note: Major-General J.C. Young commanded the Home Counties Division at the outbreak of the war. He accompanied the division to India, departing on 30 October 1914. On arrival, he handed over the units and returned to England, arriving on 22 December.) |
| 4 April 1917 | Major-General | Hon. C.E. Bingham (Note: Major-General Hon. C.E. Bingham was commander until 6 June 1919.) |

== See also ==
- 44th (Home Counties) Division for the 1st Line formation
- List of British divisions in World War I

== Bibliography ==
- Becke, Archibald F. (1936). Order of Battle of Divisions Part 2A. The Territorial Force Mounted Divisions and the 1st-Line Territorial Force Divisions (42–56). London: HMSO. OCLC 4405016.
- Becke, Archibald F. (1937). Order of Battle of Divisions Part 2B. The 2nd-Line Territorial Force Divisions (57th–69th) with The Home-Service Divisions (71st–73rd) and 74th and 75th Divisions. London: HMSO. OCLC 4405016.
- Farndale, General Sir Martin (1988). The Forgotten Fronts and the Home Base, 1914–18. History of the Royal Regiment of Artillery. Woolwich: The Royal Artillery Institution. ISBN 1-870114-05-1.
- James, Brigadier E.A. (1978). British Regiments 1914–18. London: Samson Books Limited. ISBN 0-906304-03-2.
- J.B.M. Frederick, Lineage Book of British Land Forces 1660–1978, Vol I, Wakefield: Microform Academic, 1984, ISBN 1-85117-007-3.
- J.B.M. Frederick, Lineage Book of British Land Forces 1660–1978, Vol II, Wakefield: Microform Academic, 1984, ISBN 1-85117-009-X.
- Brig-Gen F.J. Moberly, History of the Great War: The Campaign in Mesopotamia, Vol IV, London: HM Stationery Office, 1927/Imperial War Museum and Battery Press, 2011, ISBN 978-0-89839290-6/Uckfield: Naval & Military, 2011, ISBN 978-1-84574-939-2.
- Col L.F. Morling, Sussex Sappers: A History of the Sussex Volunteer and Territorial Army Royal Engineer Units from 1890 to 1967, Seaford: 208th Field Co, RE/Christians–W.J. Offord, 1972.
- Rinaldi, Richard A (2008). Order of Battle of the British Army 1914. Ravi Rikhye. ISBN 978-0-97760728-0.
