= Greeks in Hawaii =

Helene
Total population
- 2,119 (0.2%, 2010)

Languages
- Greek, English, Hawaiian

Religion
- Greek Orthodox

Related ethnic groups
- Greek American Greek Australian

Greeks in Hawaii or Helene were some of the earliest foreigners (Hawaiian: haole) to immigrate to Hawaii and were known for being one of the few ethnicities to be opposed to the overthrow of the Hawaiian monarchy.

== Early contact ==
The earliest Greeks came to Hawaii after Captain James Cook, including some with Captain George Vancouver’s expedition. Subsequently, in the 1830s Greeks came as whalers and traders. The Russian Orthodox Church was established in 1839 which Greek Orthodox Christians attended. Hiram Bingham I of the ABCFM held a certain degree of approval that the Greeks were at the minimum Christians, but the missionary community would learn to loathe the Greeks. In 1850 princes Alexander Liholiho and Lot Kapuāiwa met Greek Minister Spyridon Trikoupis in Paris who encouraged them to join him in drinking and gambling, against Gerrit Judd’s objections.

== Later establishment ==
In the 1870s Greeks began to emigrate because of famine and over-population in Greece for labor on Hawaii’s sugarcane plantations. A few entrepreneurial Greeks who came to Hawaii in the 1880s formed a tight community and gave jobs to fellow countrymen at their businesses. The ABCFM missionaries had since become a group of wealthy elite and the disdain for the Greeks had increased. William Alexander described Greeks as "commercial, ingenious and eloquent, but deceitful, dirty and immoral". Among the immigrants was Peter Camarinos, who joined as co-partner of Campbell, Marshall, and Company. Camarinos was sued by A. J. Campbell for $6,750. Paul Neumann defended Camarinos and had the suit dismissed. This was followed up by two countersuits. After the suit the new Greeks of the community avoided the missionaries and instead acquainted themselves with the monarchs. The Greeks came to compete against the missionaries in the export and pineapple industries. Further disapproval by the conservative missionaries was caused by the Greeks' tendency to attend and hold parties which included King David Kalākaua. An additional source of disapproval was the hospitality industry, which provided drinking, music, and partying.

== Overthrow of the Kingdom ==
As the missionaries turned to aggression the political situation became increasingly unfavorable to the Greeks.

On June 30, 1887, the missionary group called the Hawaiian League forced the bayonet constitution on King Kalākaua. In 1891 King Kalākaua died and his sister, Queen Liliʻuokalani, ascended the throne. On January 17, 1893, Queen Liliʻuokalani was overthrown by businessmen and the missionary elite.

George Lycurgus was arrested and fined for disturbing the peace and distributing alcohol without a liquor license. He believed the ulterior motive for his arrest was for his support of the monarchy. His brother, John, had difficulties obtaining licenses for various industries. Under the new government hula was banned and public concerts of Hawaiian music were outlawed. But private performances of Hawaiian music were legal and George Lycurgus hired the National Band to play at his hotel, Sans Souci, to the annoyance of pro-government supporters.

The Greeks took part in opposing the Provisional Government and Republic. A number joined the counter-revolutionaries plotting to restore the monarchy. Hawaii's Schuetzen Club was taken over by German, Austrian, Greek, and British royalists and transformed into a front organization to train counter-revolutionaries.

The uprising was put down swiftly and royalists were captured and arrested, including some Greeks, of which two were exiled.

== Killing of Peter Camarinos ==
Significant to the small Greek community at the time was the death of Peter G. Camarinos. Camarinos had been considered the one most aggressively in favor of the counter-revolution, a major planner and sponsor of the insurgency. He stated "I will give half that I am worth to see the damned Missionary sons of bitches hung".

By 1896 Camarinos had allegedly become mentally ill; his friends and family supported him and had him admitted to Andrews Asylum for the Insane in California. One year later he was dead; the asylum physician concluded he had died of paresis. Camarinos’ family received his body in an advanced stage of decomposition two or three days after he had died. His family accused the asylum of purposefully using the decay to conceal bruises that implied that he had been kicked and beaten to death. John R. Griffith, who had been admitted to the asylum for dementia, witnessed Camarinos complain about his breakfast, then attack an attendant named John Lynn and then attack a nurse. Two other attendants intervened and threw Camarinos to the ground and held him down as Lynn jumped onto Camarinos’ stomach repeatedly until Camarinos fainted.

A critic of the Republic suggested the killing was ordered by Sanford B. Dole and William O. Smith to eliminate an enemy and make an example of Camarinos for opposing the Republic.

== Community today ==
The Saints Constantine and Helen Greek Orthodox Cathedral of the Pacific (Honolulu) is still active. It has a Greek-language school for children.

== See also ==
- Europeans in Oceania
- Portuguese immigration to Hawaii
- Spanish immigration to Hawaii
