= Spanish immigration to Hawaii =

Spanish Immigrants to Hawaii
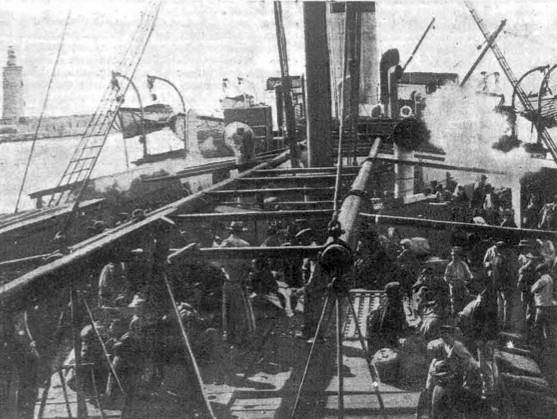
- Spanish immigrants crowd the deck of the SS Heliopolis in 1907 on their way to Hawaii.

Languages
- Spanish, English

Religion
- Roman Catholic

Related ethnic groups
- Spanish Americans

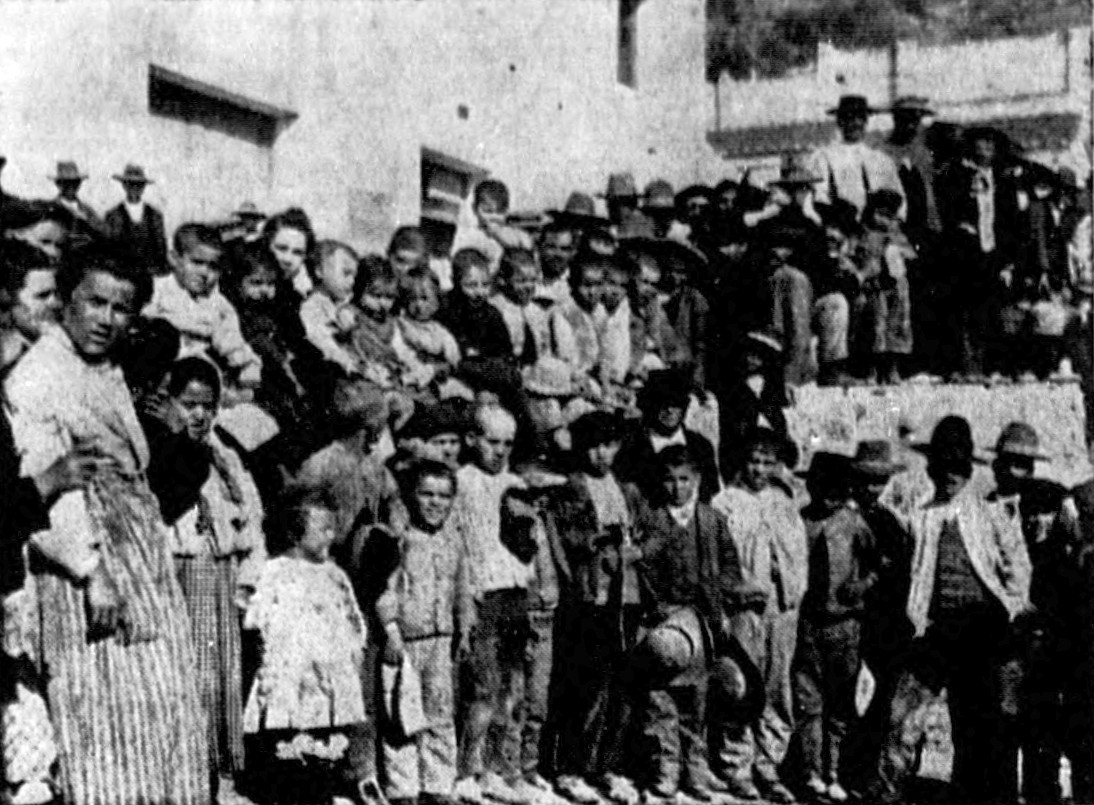
Spanish children from the SS Heliopolis after arriving in Hawaii.

Spanish immigration to Hawaii began in 1907 when the Hawaiian government and the Hawaiian Sugar Planters' Association (HSPA) decided to supplement their ongoing importation of Portuguese workers to Hawaii with workers recruited from Spain. Importation of Spanish laborers, along with their families, continued until 1913, at which time more than 9,000 Spanish immigrants had been brought in, most recruited to work primarily on the Hawaiian sugarcane plantations.

== History ==
=== Precedents ===
Hawaiian historians, such as Reginald Yzendoorn and Richard W. Rogers, defended the possibility of the first European discovery of the Hawaiian Islands by Spain, especially by the Spanish sailor Juan Gaetano, since several 16th-century documents and maps detailed islands in the same geographical position that received the name: "La Mesa" in the case of Hawaii, "La Desgraciada" to refer to Maui, "Ulloa" to Kahoʻolawe, and "Los Monges" to Lanai and Molokai. In addition, other logbooks, such as those of the corvettes Descubierta and Atrevida, make these islands coincide at the same point in the Pacific Ocean. Likewise, geographers who had access to privileged information about the Spanish expeditions, such as Abraham Ortelius, did not fail to locate islands called “Los Bolcanes” and “La Farfana” at those same coordinates.

=== Early immigration ===
Perhaps the first Spanish immigrant to take up residence in Hawaii was Francisco de Paula Marín (1774-1837), a self-promoting adventurer who knew several languages, and served King Kamehameha I as an interpreter and military advisor. Later Marin may have advised Kamehameha's son Kauikeaouli (Kamehameha III) on Hawaii's fledgling cattle industry, as Marin had spent time in Spanish California, and Kauikeaouli visited there in 1832 to observe the California cattle industry first-hand. Kauikeaouli was greatly impressed with the horsemanship and cattle handling skills of the Spanish vaqueros of California, and he invited several of them to Hawaii to teach those skills to his own people. The native Hawaiians these vaqueros trained became the "Paniolo", or "Hawaiian cowboys", who carry on a tradition of horsemanship and cattle ranching to the present day. There were, no doubt, other Spanish adventurers who arrived throughout the mid-19th century on whaling ships, but their numbers would have been few. Spanish immigrants to Hawaii in fact were so few prior to 1900 that they were counted only as "Other Foreigners" in the Hawaiian census returns.

=== Immigration during 1907 to 1913 ===
Multiethnic Spanish Hawaiians

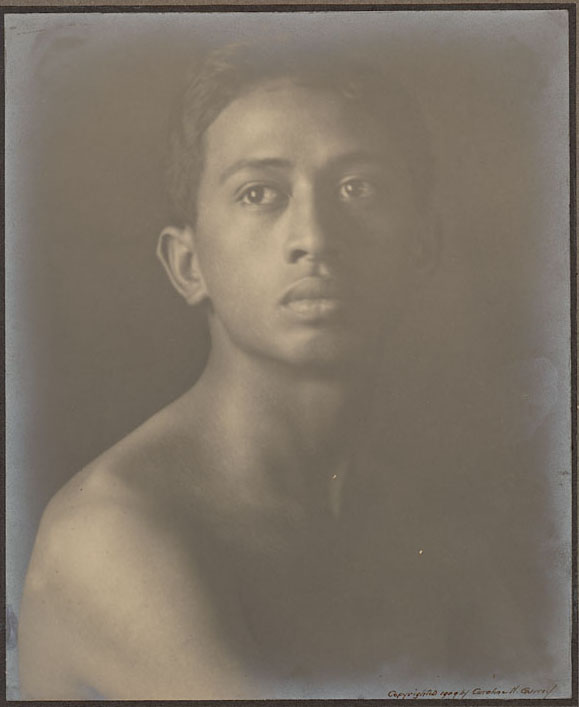
Spanish-Hawaiian boy, "Iago"

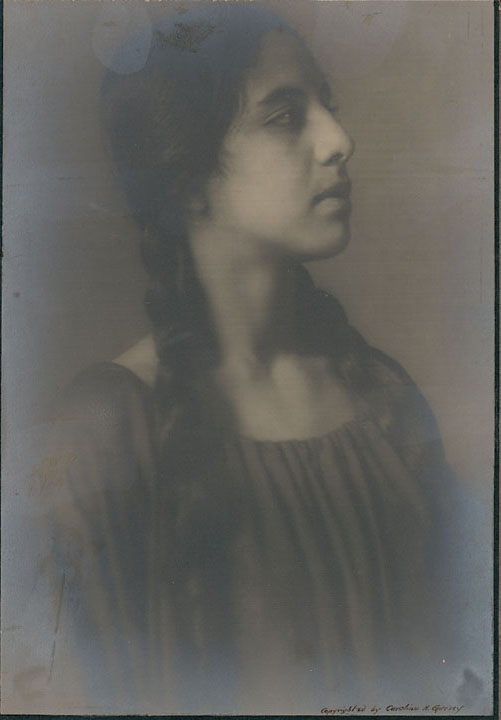
Spanish-Hawaiian girl, "The Chieftess"

The rise in the late 1800s of the sugar industry in the Hawaiian Islands created a huge demand for laborers to work on the sugarcane plantations. The Hawaiian government, with the support of the plantation owners, initially brought in contract laborers from China to fill this need, but public sentiment gradually turned against continued importation of the Chinese, and Portuguese workers were recruited to take their place. However, the high cost associated with shipping Portuguese laborers and their families to Hawaii, and the reality that many Portuguese remained on the plantations only long enough to fulfill their contractual obligations, led the Hawaiian Sugar Planters' Association (HSPA) to encourage the government to consider alternate sources of labor. Spain in particular was felt to be a viable source of contract workers, who were culturally more acceptable than many of the other ethnic groups that had already been brought in.

The importation of Spanish laborers to Hawaii began in 1907, when the British steamship SS Heliopolis arrived in Honolulu Harbor with 2,246 immigrants from the Málaga province of Spain. However, rumored poor accommodations and food on the voyage created political complications that delayed the next Spanish importation until 1911, when the SS Orteric arrived with a mixed contingent of 960 Spanish and 565 Portuguese immigrants, the Spanish having boarded at Gibraltar, and the Portuguese at Porto and Lisbon. However, the two groups argued and fought with each other during the long voyage, "so much so that they had to be separated. The women . . . went as far as hair pulling." Although Portuguese immigration to Hawaii effectively ended after the arrival of the Orteric, the importation of Spanish laborers and their families continued until 1913, ultimately bringing to Hawaii a total of 9,262 Spanish immigrants.

Despite hopes that the Spanish immigrants who came to Hawaii would stay and continue to work on the sugarcane plantations, most emigrated to the mainland United States, generally California, as soon as they could in search of greater opportunity. So much so that the U.S. census for 1930 listed only 1,219 residents (0.3% of the population) of Spanish ancestry still remaining in Hawaii. Although the Spanish tended to move on, most of them to the agricultural fields of California, they were quickly supplanted by Spanish-speaking immigrants from the Philippines and Puerto Rico, who by 1930 made up, respectively, 17.1% and 1.8% of the population. By comparison, residents of Portuguese ancestry in 1930 made up 7.5% of the population. Those Spaniards who left for California did so for a variety of reasons. On the Hawaiian plantations the Spaniards were generally unhappy with the treatment they received. One San Francisco newspaper reported that the “Spaniards say that they were worked fourteen hours a day on the plantations, and that they were obliged to purchase the necessities of life from the company stores at an exorbitant price. Then there was also the issue of the plantation overseers. These men, the Field Bosses, were tasked to see that the laborers did the “proper amount of work” even if they had to be “tough.” One interviewed Spaniard quit his job as a Field Boss and left Hawaii because he could not stand “mistreating other human beings.” In California the Andalucians established communities in the orchard towns and settled down. Over the years, the next generation of Hawaiian Spaniards gradually left the orchards and started new occupations in the Santa Clara Valley and other California regions. Although the majority of Spanish immigrants found themselves to still be day laborers until at least the 1940’s, when the war industries provided a chance for many families to find more lucrative opportunities.

==== Voyages to Hawaii ====
Six ships between 1907 and 1913 brought over 9,000 Spanish immigrants from the Spanish mainland to Hawaii. Although many of the Portuguese immigrants who preceded them to Hawaii arrived on small wooden sailing ships of less than a thousand gross tonnage capacity, all of the ships involved in the Spanish immigration were large, steel-hulled, passenger steamships.

Ships that brought Spanish immigrants to Hawaii from 1907-1913

Ship Name	Type of Vessel	Flag	Arrival Date	Port of Origin	Days at Sea	Men	Women	Children	Total
Heliopolis	Steamship	British	26 April 1907	Málaga (Spain) by way of the Azores	47 days	608	554	1084	2246
Orteric (Osteric)	Steamship	British	13 April 1911	Porto & Lisbon (Portugal) and Gibraltar	48 days (Gibraltar)	547	373	531	1451
Willesden	Steamship	British	13 December 1911	Gibraltar	52 days	639	400	758	1797
Harpalion	Steamship	British	16 April 1912	Gibraltar	51 days	496	496	626	1618
Willesden	Steamship	British	30 March 1913	Gibraltar	49 days	491	377	490	1358
Ascot	Steamship	British	4 June 1913	Cádiz (Spain)	60 days	424	327	532	1283
						2,994	2,527	4,021	
								Total	9,753

Because 491 of the immigrants on the SS Orteric were Portuguese, there was a net importation of 9,262 Spanish immigrants.

== Cultural cooperation ==
In 1864, Spain was interested in having greater contacts with Hawaii, being able to establish a consul in Honolulu, since at that time Spain still maintained overseas provinces in the Pacific. Therefore, it was very beneficial diplomatically to look for historical vestiges that would bring Hawaiian and Spanish culture closer. There are twinning agreements between musical and sports associations, especially surfing, shared between the Canary Islands and Hawaii.

== See also ==
- Asian immigration to Hawaii
- Chinese immigration to Hawaii
- Europeans in Oceania
- Filipinos in Hawaii
- Greeks in Hawaii
- Japanese in Hawaii
- Korean immigration to Hawaii
- Portuguese immigration to Hawaii
- Puerto Rican immigration to Hawaii
