= Kill Haole Day =

Hawaiian school bullying incidents

- Date: The second to last day of school (May or June)
- Location: Hawaii, U.S.

Kill Haole Day is the term for bullying incidents that occurred in some public Hawaii schools, when non-white students would harass and attack white students. (Haole is a Hawaiian term for individuals who are not Native Hawaiian, but typically used to describe white people.) Kill Haole Day was discussed by the Hawaii State Legislature when debating hate crimes legislation in 1999.

In his 2009 book, lawyer and former Hawaiʻi governor Ben Cayetano wrote that "Kill Haole Day" began as a news story headline about an incident between haole and local (not just Hawaiian) students. After that, "whenever there was a fight or an incident between haole and non-haole students, the news media", and newspaper editorial boards, "repeatedly reprised 'Kill Haole Day' in their news stories".

In 1999, School Superintendent Paul LeMahieu said he was aware of "Kill Haole Day" but not of any significant incidents. Also, in 1999, it was an issue during debate on hate crimes legislation.

On December 31, 2008, the U.S. Department of Education released a report on Kealakehe Intermediate School in Kailua-Kona that concluded there was "substantial evidence that students experienced racially and sexually derogatory name-calling on nearly a daily basis on school buses, at school bus stops, in school hallways and other areas of the school". The report also concluded that school officials responded inadequately or not at all when students complained of racial harassment. Students who did complain were retaliated against by their antagonists.
