= SV Suffolk =

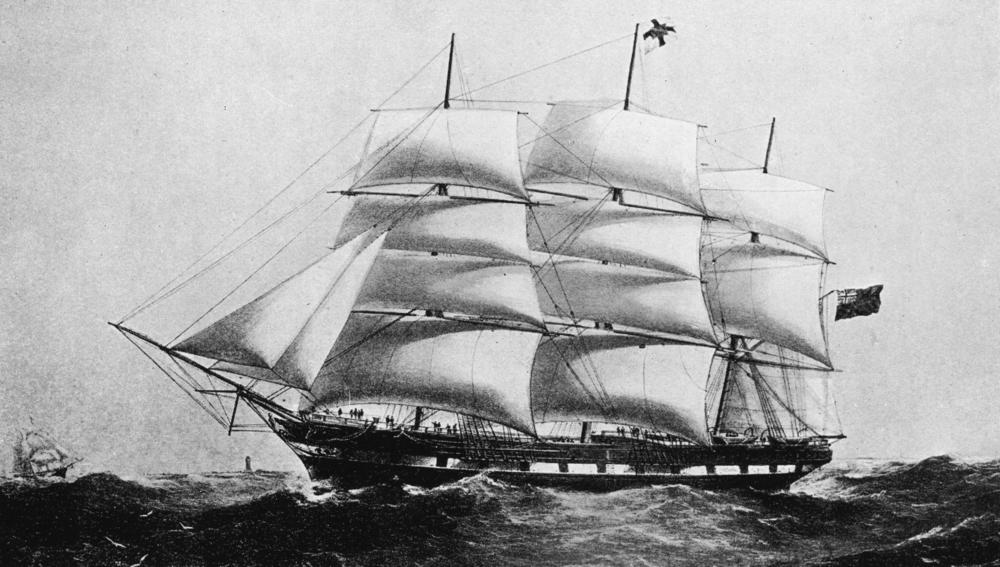
The British ship Suffolk in 1881 brought 488 Azores Islanders to Hawaii.

The SV Suffolk is a British sailing ship, built in 1857 as a Blackwall frigate, that in 1881 became the second ship to deliver Portuguese immigrants from the Azores Islands to Hawaii. It was the fourth ship overall to participate in the Portuguese immigration to Hawaii, having been preceded by the SS Priscilla, SS Ravenscrag and SV Highflyer.

== See also ==
- Portuguese immigration to Hawaii
