= Portuguese immigration to Hawaii =

History of Portuguese people in Hawaii

Total population
- 4.3% of Hawaiians in 2008 claimed Portuguese ancestry

Languages
- Portuguese, English, Hawaiian

Religion
- Roman Catholic

Portuguese immigration to Hawaii began in 1878 when laborers from Madeira and the Azores migrated there to work in the sugarcane plantations. By the end of 1911, nearly 16,000 Portuguese immigrants had arrived.

== Early immigration ==
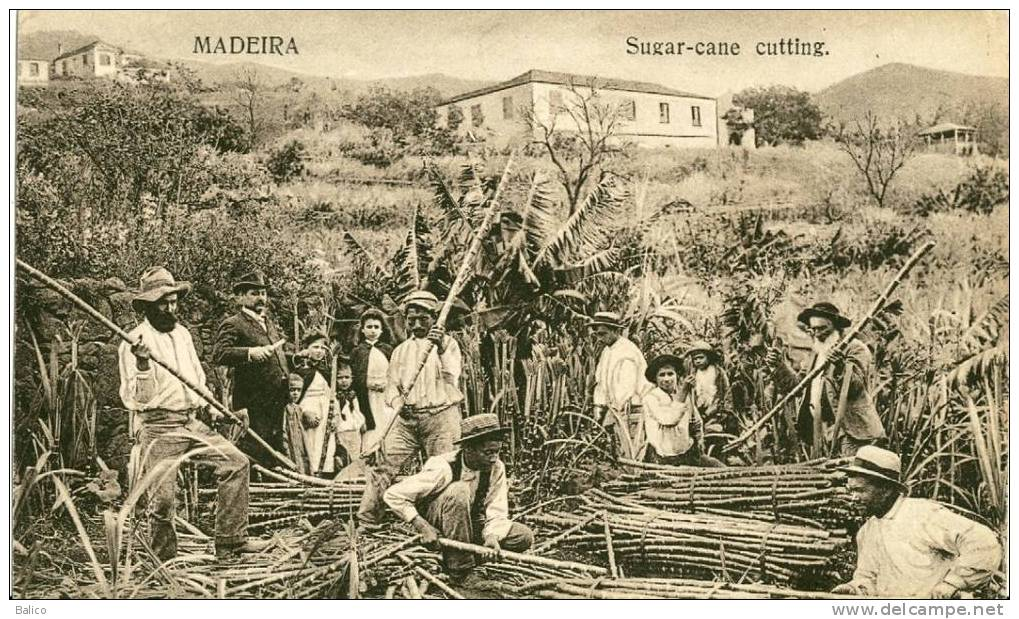
Madeira Islanders cutting sugarcane. About 6,000 of them by 1913 came to Hawaii to do the same work.

The Hawaiian census of 1878 showed that only 438 residents out of 57,985 people were Portuguese, less than 0.8% of the population. Most of these Portuguese residents had been born either in the Azores or Madeira Islands, and nearly all had arrived as sailors on whaling ships. Although a few brought their wives or were joined by them later, women made up only about one-eighth of this tiny immigrant community. Despite the fact that so few Portuguese had made their way to the Hawaiian Islands prior to 1878, those that did found opportunity and tended to stay.

Conditions in Hawaii in 1878 were conducive to immigration. King Kalākaua, who had recently ascended the Hawaiian throne, encouraged closer ties with Europe, and a growing Hawaiian economy, due largely to increased sugar exports to California, created a demand for laborers to work the sugarcane plantations. After Native Hawaiian workers had been decimated by disease, there were not enough laborers to supply the sugarcane plantations. In 1852, Hawaii began importing Chinese workers. So many Chinese were brought in that, by 1878, they made up nearly 10% of the population. Although Chinese immigrants worked hard, they were accused of gambling, prostitution, and opium use. A search for alternate sources of labor led both the Hawaiian government and the plantation owners to offer incentives and concessions not given the Chinese nor other Asian ethnic groups, to attract immigrants of European descent willing to work in the cane fields.

== Immigration of 1878 to 1911 ==
Multiethnic Portuguese Hawaiians, 1909

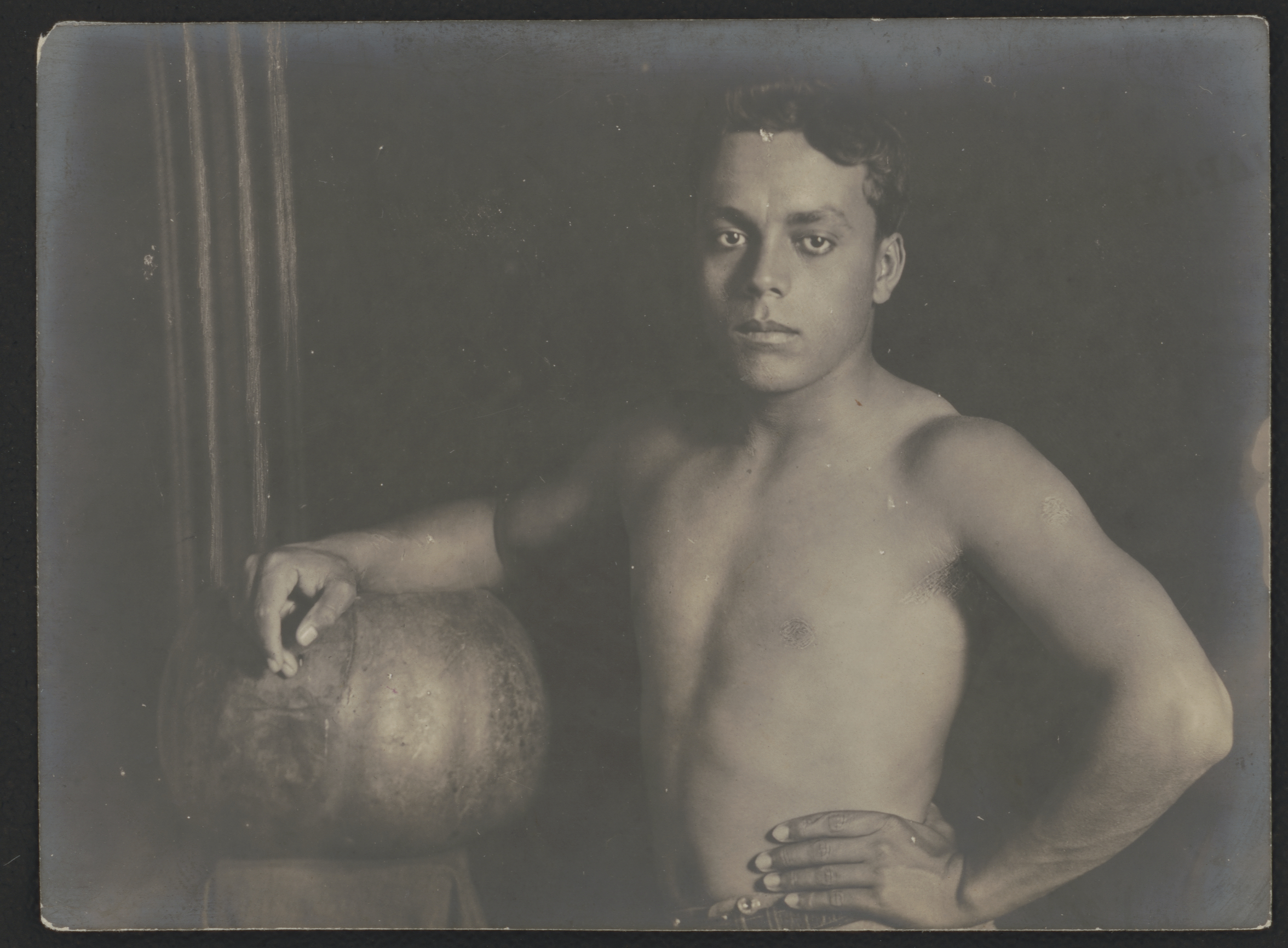
Portuguese-Hawaiian boy

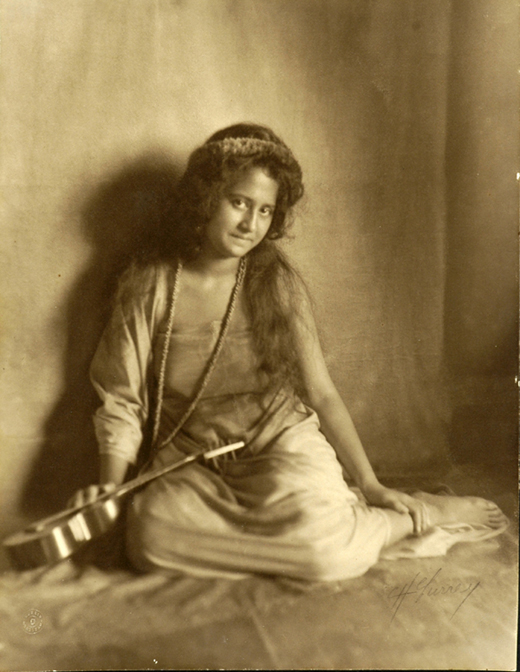
French-Portuguese-Hawaiian woman

Jason Perry (born Jacinto Pereira), a Portuguese settler who served as the Portuguese Consul to Hawaii, suggested in 1876 to plantation owners of the Planters' Society (a predecessor of the Hawaiian Sugar Planters' Association) that the Madeira and Azores Islands of Portugal might be ideal sources of reliable workers. Portuguese colonists had first settled these islands in the Middle Ages, and the terrain and subtropical climate were very similar to that of the Hawaiian Islands. Most importantly though, sugarcane had been the mainstay of the economy in Madeira and the Azores for over 400 years and most of the population was involved in one way or another in the sugarcane industry.

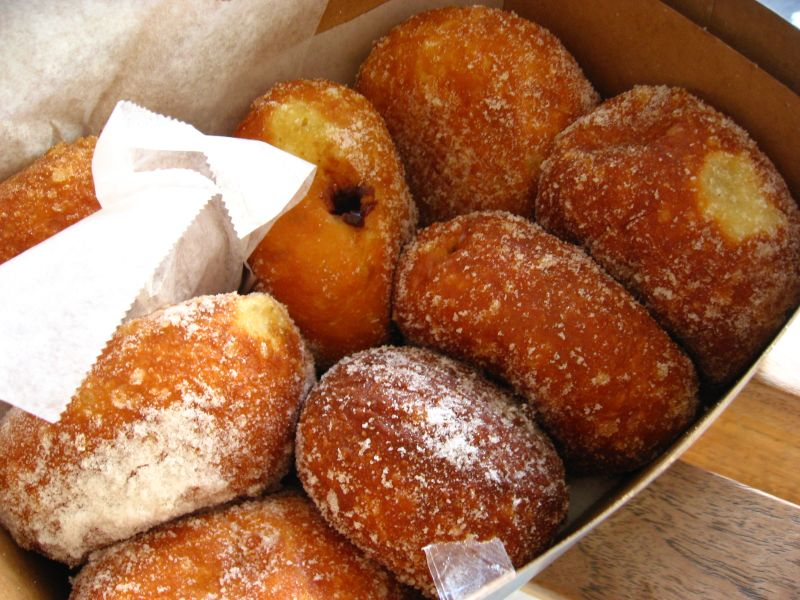
Malasadas are a popular Hawaiian pastry originating in the Azores islands.

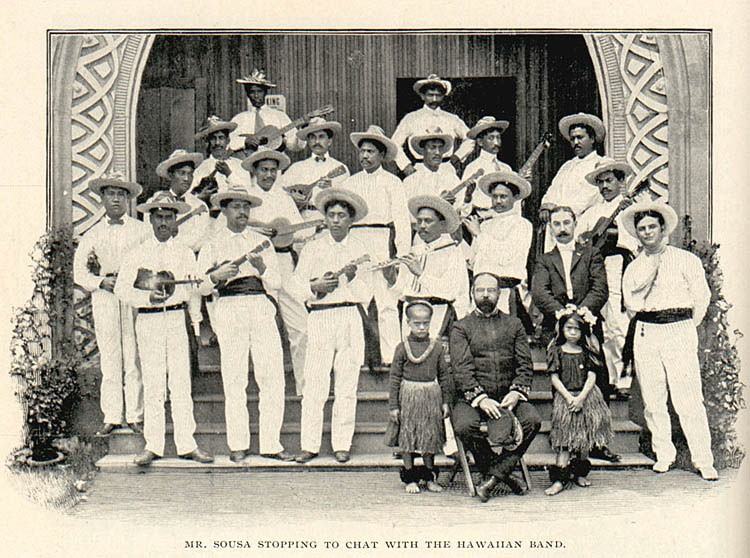
John Philip Sousa with ukulele players of the Hawaiian Band, 1901

Intrigued by Perry's suggestion, the Planters' Society began recruiting Portuguese contract workers, first in 1878 from the Madeira Islands, then two years later from the Azores as well. Several ships between 1878 and 1887 brought to Hawaii more than 3,300 Portuguese men from these islands, but because many of the men brought their wives, children, and other relatives as well, there was an actual immigration during these years of about 10,700 Portuguese. Whereas contracts for the Chinese workers that preceded them generally stipulated single men only, the Portuguese were allowed to bring their families, an incentive that the plantation owners hoped would provide stability. Prior to independence in 1975, many Cape Verdeans emigrated to Hawaii from drought-stricken Portuguese Cape Verde, an overseas province of Portugal. Since these people arrived using their Portuguese passports, they were registered as Portuguese immigrants by the Hawaiian (and later, American) authorities.

Portuguese immigration to the islands slowed after 1887, which was the same year that King Kalākaua was stripped of power, and about the same time that importation of other ethnic groups increased. Nonetheless, Portuguese immigration continued, and by the end of 1911 almost 16,000 Portuguese had arrived. Unfortunately, the more affluent members of Hawaiian society tended to view these newcomers as inferior or "low class". Growing resentment at being treated as "second-class citizens" resulted in many Portuguese later emigrating to the mainland United States, particularly California, in search of equality and opportunity. Though many left, many stayed and, by 1910, Portuguese residents made up 11.6% of the population of Hawaii.

== Immigrant culture and traditions ==
Native Hawaiian speakers called the Portuguese immigrants who came to their country "Pukikī." These newcomers were devout followers of the Roman Catholic faith with strong family ties. Most were short, with slender builds, and dark skin from long hours of working under the sun in the cane fields. Many of Cape Verdean or other mixed African heritage were in fact so dark that their race on some of the early U.S. census returns were listed as black, which contributed to prejudice against them. Because few of these immigrants could read or write, they had strong oral traditions and they retained much of the culture and traditions brought with them.

One popular Portuguese tradition in Hawaii today is the making of malasadas, which are deep-fried pastries similar to the beignet of New Orleans, that traditionally have no holes or fillings but coated in granulated cane sugar. They were first made by Hawaiian residents from the Madeira and Azores Islands, who would use up butter and sugar prior to Lent by cooking malasadas. These pastries are an important part in Madeira and the Azores of the "Terça-feira Gorda", a festival also known as Carnaval and the same holiday as "Fat Tuesday" or "Mardi Gras" elsewhere. In Hawaii the occasion is called "Malasada Day" and it dates to the time of the 19th-century sugarcane plantations.

Another popular Portuguese tradition in Hawaii is the Holy Spirit Festival (Festa do Espírito Santo), which, since 1901, is celebrated each May with a parade and feast. This three-day event is not an official church holiday, but a traditional observance that began in the 18th century with the Cult of the Holy Spirit in the Azores. It usually starts on a Friday night, followed on Saturday by decorating religious statues for the festivities to follow. On Sunday a young woman is chosen to represent Queen Isabel the sixth queen of Portugal, to preside over a court leading a colorful parade. The final event is a mass with a "Blessing of the meat and bread" by a priest, after which Isabel is crowned the Holy Ghost Queen. A feast is then held in "a tradition of charity and feeding the poor," where food is served to all present. The foods of this feast typically include malasadas (pastries), paodoce (sweet bread), bean soup, Portuguese sausages, and bowls of beef and fish marinated in wine.

The best-known Portuguese contribution to Hawaiian culture is the ukulele, based on the traditional Portuguese braguinha (cavaquinho). The introduction of the ukulele is generally credited to Madeiran cabinet makers Manuel Nunes, Augusto Dias, and José do Espírito Santo, who came to the Islands in 1879 on the British clipper SS Ravenscrag. The Hawaiian Gazette in late August 1879, two weeks after the arrival of the Ravenscrag, reported that "Madeira Islanders recently arrived here have been delighting the people with nightly street concerts." The article then mentions "their strange instruments, which are a kind of cross between a guitar and banjo."

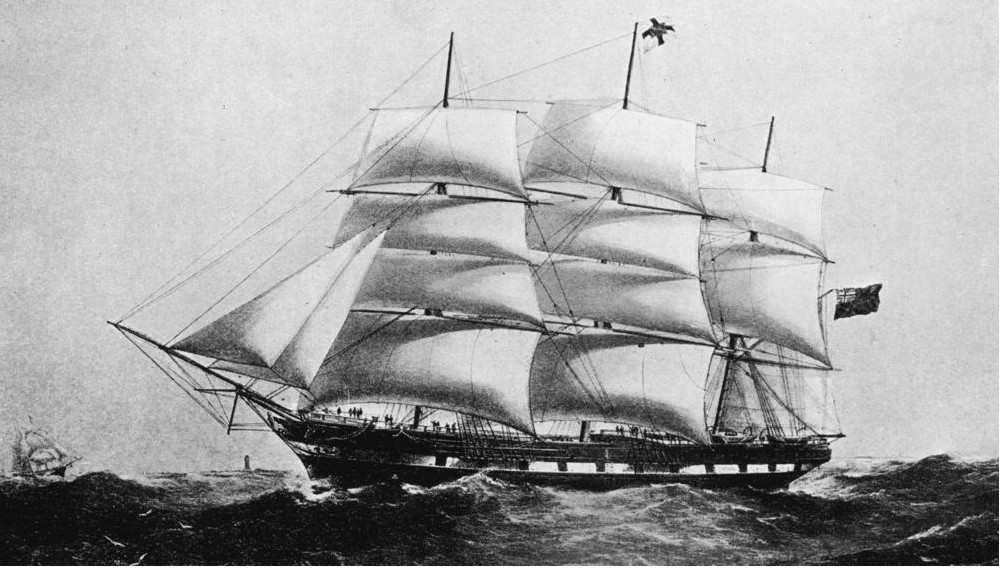
The British ship Suffolk in 1881 brought 488 Azores Islanders to Hawaii.

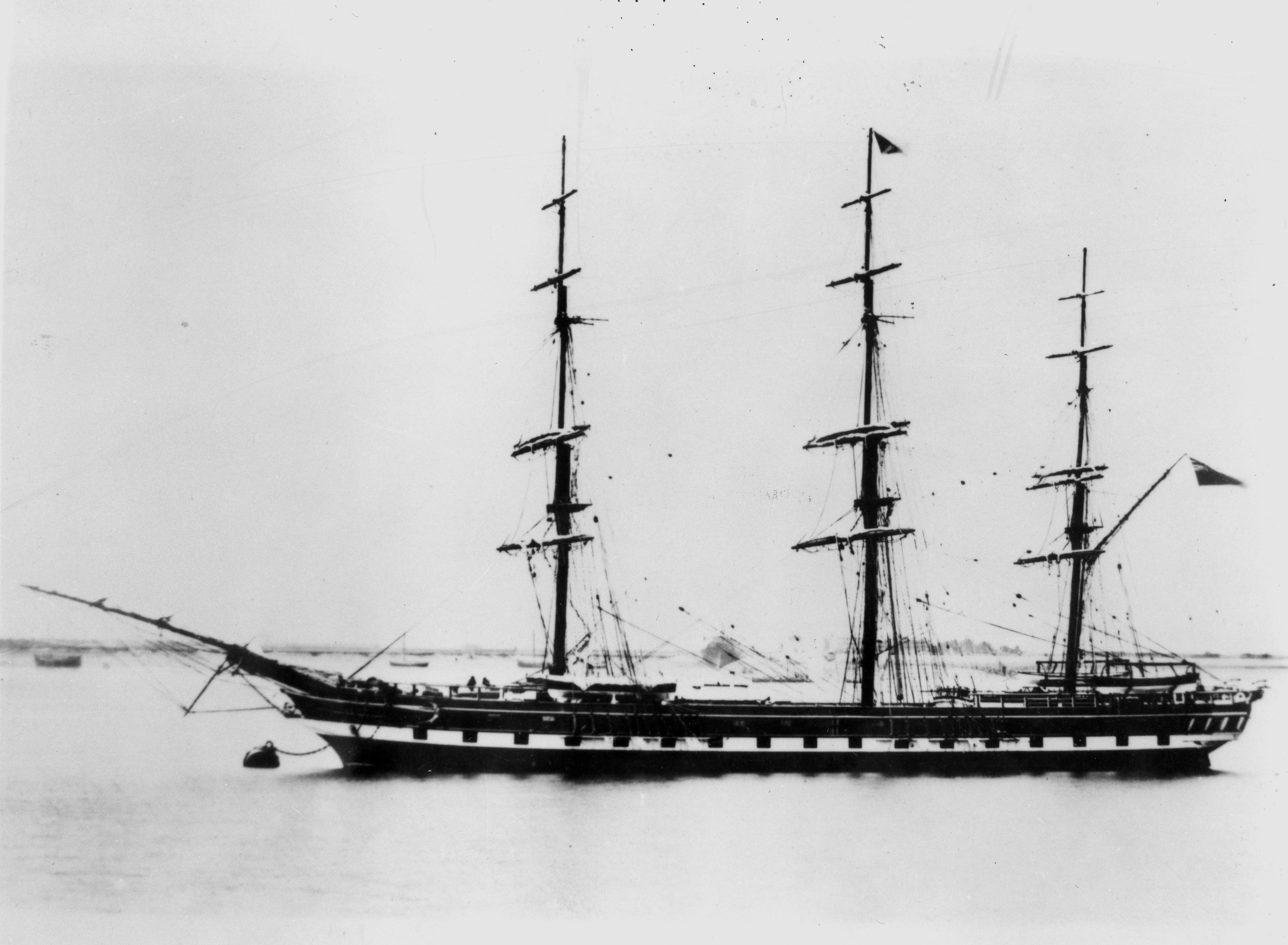
Six months after the arrival of the Suffolk the Earl Dalhousie brought 322 more immigrants from the Azores to Hawaii.

== Shipping routes ==
At least 24 different ships from 1878 to 1911 brought almost 16,000 Portuguese immigrants to Hawaii. Although mainly from Madeira and the Azores, there were also contingents from the eastern United States, mainland Portugal, and from the Portuguese community of Montevideo, Uruguay. Although conditions onboard these ships from 1882 on improved dramatically, as most immigrants by then came by steamship, the first arrivals to Hawaii from Madeira and the Azores spent up to three months at sea in cramped quarters on sailing ships. Strong currents crossing the Atlantic and rough seas when coming around Cape Horn at the tip of South America made for a perilous voyage. When the SS Ravenscrag reached port with its load of immigrants in 1879 after 123 days at sea, three children had perished during the voyage. Even three years later when the first group of immigrants to reach Hawaii by steamship arrived in 1882 on the SS Monarch after 57 days at sea, 13 children had died on the voyage.

Ships that brought Portuguese settlers to Hawaii from 1878-1912

Ship Name	Type of Vessel	Flag	Arrival Date	Port of Origin	Days at Sea	Men	Women	Children	Total
Priscilla	Bark	German	30 September 1878	Funchal, Madeira	116 days	80	40	60	180
Ravenscrag	Clipper	British	23 August 1879	Funchal, Madeira	123 days	133	110	176	419
High Flyer	Bark	British	24 January 1880	São Miguel, Azores	99 days	109	81	147	337
High Flyer	Bark	British	2 May 1881	São Miguel, Azores	130 days	173	66	113	352
Suffolk	Bark	British	25 August 1881	São Miguel, Azores	102 days	206	100	182	488
Earl Dalhausie	Bark	British	27 March 1882	São Miguel, Azores	113 days	94	82	146	322
Monarch	Steamship	British	8 June 1882	São Miguel, Azores	57 days	202	197	458	857
Hansa	Steamship	British	15 September 1882	Azores	70 days	307	286	584	1177
Abergeldie	Steamship	British	4 May 1883	Azores	62 days	264	190	484	938
Hankow	Steamship	British	9 July 1883	Azores (São Miguel) & Madeira	66 days	427	317	718	1462
Bell Rock	Steamship	British	1 November 1883	Azores	76 days	396	294	715	1405
City of Paris	Steamship	British	13 June 1884	Azores (São Miguel) & Madeira	74 days	295	199	330	824
Bordeaux	Steamship	British	3 October 1884	Madeira	72 days	273	173	262	708
Daca	Bark	British	19 January 1885	Madeira	114 days	63	50	165	278
Stirlingshire (Sterlingshire)	Clipper	British	4 March 1886	Madeira	112 days	157	107	203	467
Amana	Steamship	British	23 September 1886	Funchal, Madeira	142 days	146	116	239	501
Thomas Bell	Bark	British	13 April 1888	Madeira	156 days	117	62	163	342
Braunfels	Steamship	German	4 April 1895	Ponta Delgada, Azores	68 days	274	124	259	657
Victoria (Parthia)	Steamship	British	13 September 1899	Madeira	67 days	215	56	72	343
Warrimoo	Steamship	New Zealand	24 December 1900	Vancouver, U.S.	10 days	60	14	18	92
Aorangi	Steamship	New Zealand	16 February 1901	Vancouver, U.S.	8 days	9	7	7	23
Suveric	Steamship	British	1 December 1906	Uruguay (Montevideo) & Azores (Fayal)	52 days	459	283	582	1324
Kumeric	Steamship	British	27 June 1907	Funchal, Madeira	58 days	333	306	475	1114
Swanley	Steamship	British	14 December 1909	Azores (P Delgada) & Madeira (Funchal)	49 & 55 days	337	221	310	868
Orteric (Osteric)^{*}	Steamship	British	13 April 1911	Portugal (Oporto & Lisbon) and Gibraltar	48 days (from Gibraltar)	547	373	531	1451
								Total	16,929

^{*}There were also 960 Spanish immigrants on the Orteric, which leaves a net importation of 15,969 Portuguese immigrants.

== Hawaiians of Portuguese descent ==
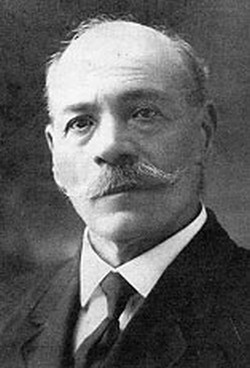
Manuel Nunes, who came to Hawaii in 1879, is credited with helping to introduce the Ukulele to Hawaiian culture.

Although Portuguese sailors probably visited Hawaii as early as 1794, the earliest Portuguese immigrant of whom there is official record, and the first Portuguese immigrant of note, was Dr. João (John) Elliott de Castro, who arrived in 1814 and became the personal physician, and retainer of King Kamehameha I. Since Castro's day there have been many Portuguese-Hawaiians of note, some of whom are listed below.

- Stephen Peter Alencastre (1876–1940), Catholic Bishop of Hawaii.
- John Gaspar Machado (1846–1937) Constructed Hawaii’s first formidable coffee mill in 1880 by Napo‘Opo‘O, Honaunau-Napoopoo near Kealakekua Bay on the Big Island near the Kona coffee growing region.
- Bryan Baptiste (1955–2008), Former Mayor of the County of Kauaʻi.
- Brennen Carvalho (born 1985), football player
- Bernard Carvalho (born 1961), Former Mayor of the County of Kauaʻi, former pro football player for the Miami Dolphins.
- Auliʻi Cravalho (born 2000), actress known for her role in the 2016 Disney film Moana.
- Wesley Correira (born 1978), professional mixed martial arts fighter.
- Frank De Lima (born 1949), comedian.
- Frank Ferera (1885–1951), ukulele and Hawaiian steel guitar player.
- Sid Fernandez, (born 1962), professional baseball player.
- Kurt Gouveia (born 1964), professional football player.
- Manuel Henriques (1888–1974), former Vice Speaker of the territorial/state House of Representatives.
- Billy Martin, (1928–1989), baseball manager. Though born in California, his father came to Hawaii from the Azores.
- Glenn Medeiros (born 1970), singer and songwriter.
- Leroy A. Mendonca (1932–1951), posthumous Korean War recipient of the Medal of Honor.
- Ernest Morgado (1917–2002), businessman, created huli-huli chicken.
- Manuel Nunes (1843–1922), ukulele maker, and self-proclaimed inventor of the ukulele.
- Prince Oana (1910–1976), professional baseball player.
- Bobo Olson (1928–2002), professional boxer
- Jonah Ray (born 1982), comedian.
- Clarence Richard Silva (born 1949), Catholic Bishop of Honolulu.
- Brad Tavares (born 1987), professional mixed martial arts fighter.
- Freddie Tavares (1913–1990), designer of the Fender Stratocaster.
- Kanekoa Texeira (born 1986), former professional baseball player and coach.
- Shane Victorino (born 1980), professional baseball player.

== See also ==
- Asian immigration to Hawaii
- Chinese immigration to Hawaii
- Europeans in Oceania
- Greeks in Hawaii
- Japanese in Hawaii
- Korean immigration to Hawaii
- Portuguese Americans
- Puerto Rican immigration to Hawaii
- Spanish immigration to Hawaii
