= Ravenscraig (disambiguation) =

Ravenscraig is a new town built in North Lanarkshire, Scotland

Ravenscraig may also refer to:

- Ravenscraig Castle (disambiguation)
- Ravenscraig railway station
- Ravenscraig Regional Sports Facility, a newly built large sports complex on the site of the new town.
- Ravenscraig steelworks, the former steelworks on the site of the new town.
- Ravenscraig Stadium, a multi-purpose stadium in Greenock.
- SS Ravenscraig
- Raven's Craig, a hill near Bathgate

== See also ==
- Ravenscrag (disambiguation)
