= Ravenscrag =

Ravenscrag may refer to:

- Ravenscrag, Saskatchewan, a settlement in Saskatchewan, Canada
- Ravenscrag Formation, a stratigraphical unit in the Western Canadian Sedimentary Basin
- Ravenscrag, Montreal, a former mansion in the Golden Square Mile
- SS Ravenscrag, a British clipper (later bark) that in 1879 brought Portuguese settlers to Hawaii
- Ravenscrag (Judges Guild), a 1981 role-playing game adventure

== See also ==
- Ravenscraig (disambiguation)
