= Malassada =

Portuguese-style fried doughnut

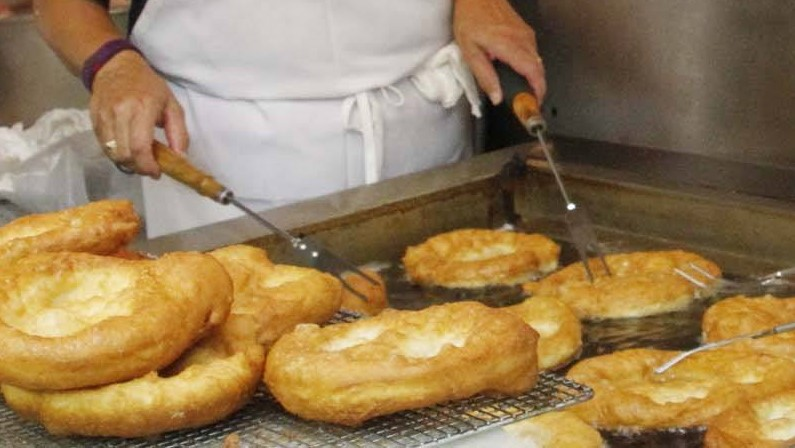
- Malassadas being made in Rhode Island by the United Brotherhood of the Holy Spirit
- Alternative names: Filhós, malasada
- Type: Doughnut
- Place of origin: Portugal
- Region or state: Funchal, Madeira
- Main ingredients: Wheat flour, sugar, eggs, milk, yeast
- Ingredients generally used: Cinnamon, molasses
- Similar dishes: Bola de Berlim, farturas, filhós, sonho, fried dough, cascoréis da Guarda

Malassada is a Portuguese fried doughnut from Madeira. It is made of flattened rounds of yeasted dough, coated with sugar and cinnamon or accompanied with molasses.

== Etymology and terminology ==
The term Malassada comes from Portuguese words "mal" and "assado" meaning "bad" and "roasted", referring to their unstructured shape.

Malassadas are often called "Hawaiian donuts" because of their popularity and cultural presence in the Hawaiian islands.

The name malassada is often used interchangeably with filhós. However, according to the Direção-Geral de Agricultura e Desenvolvimento Rural (DGARD), (Note: an official Portuguese governmental office that inventories and defines the many traditional foods of Portugal) these two regional pastries are distinct―the Azorean malassada is made during Carnaval, while the filhós of Penedono is made with brandy and olive oil instead of milk and is enjoyed year-round. Another similar pastry from the Central Region is Cascoréis da Guarda.

== History ==
The malassada is believed to be derived from the filhós from mainland Portugal and Madeira, a product of the growing sugar industry during the sixteenth century. It was exported throughout Macaronesia, where it was introduced to the Azores and Canary Islands, reaching as far as Brazil during the sixteenth and seventeenth centuries.

Malassadas were first described in the Dicionário Houaiss da Língua Portuguesa in 1609, and recorded in the ledgers of the Convento da Encarnação in Lisbon between 1688 and 1762. The Gastronomia Tradicional da Madeira e do Porto Santo describes the mal-assada (lit. 'badly-baked') referring to the "undercooked" dough inside. However, another version asserts it was previously made using melaço de cana (Portuguese: molasses), having been named melassadas or melaçadas.

Historically, malassadas were conventual sweets prepared for Terça-feira Gorda (lit. 'Fat Tuesday') with the intention of using all the lard and sugar in one's home before Ash Wednesday, the start of the Lenten Season which limits the use of fats and sugars as a form of fasting and penance, similar to other traditions like Pancake Day. It is a traditional confection eaten in the Azores and Madeira during Carnaval.

== By region ==
=== Hawaii ===
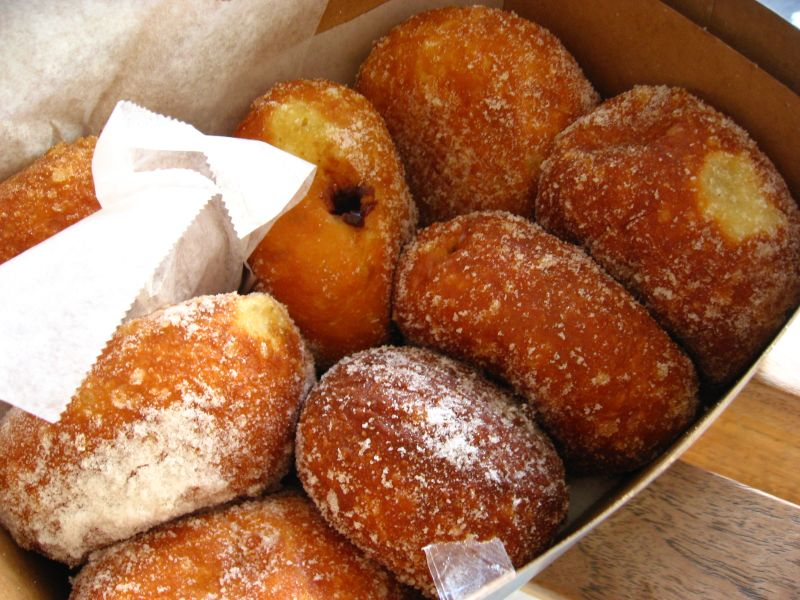
Hawaiian malasadas with various fillings

During Hawaii's plantation era in the 1870s, plantations would import laborers from China, Japan, Philippines, Korea, and Portugal to work for them. Portuguese laborers from Madeira and the Azores started to immigrate to Hawaii to work on the plantations. They brought with them their traditional foods, including fried doughnuts they called malassadas― now commonly spelled as malasadas. From there, malassadas started to gain popularity in Hawaii. These doughnuts are more closely related to the bola de berlim, a fried doughnut widely served on the beaches in Portugal. In the past, Catholic Portuguese immigrants shared it with friends of other ethnicities in the plantation camps.

Today, there are numerous bakeries in the Hawaiian Islands specializing in malassadas where it is made around the year. Some notable bakeries being Kamehameha Bakery, Leonard's Bakery, Liliha Bakery, and Pipeline Bakeshop + Creamery. Like Portuguese bolas de berlim, these doughnuts are made both with and without cream fillings. In Hawaii, they are sometimes filled with the traditional Portuguese custard cream, but there are also local cream varieties flavored with coconut, chocolate, lilikoi (passion fruit), guava, mango, ube, or pineapple.

Leonard's bakery is one of the most popular spots to get malassadas. The bakery was opened in 1952 by Leonard DoRego. His grandparents, Arsenio and Amelia Do Rego, immigrated from São Miguel Island, Azores, Portugal, to Maui, Hawai'i, to work on the plantations. Leonard Do Rego, their grandson, was born 33 years later. After marrying his wife Margaret, Leonard moved to Honolulu, Hawai'i. He worked at Snowflake Bakery until he later founded Leonard's Bakery in 1952.

The current owner of the bakery is Lenny Rego III, the grandson of Leonard and Margaret Rego.

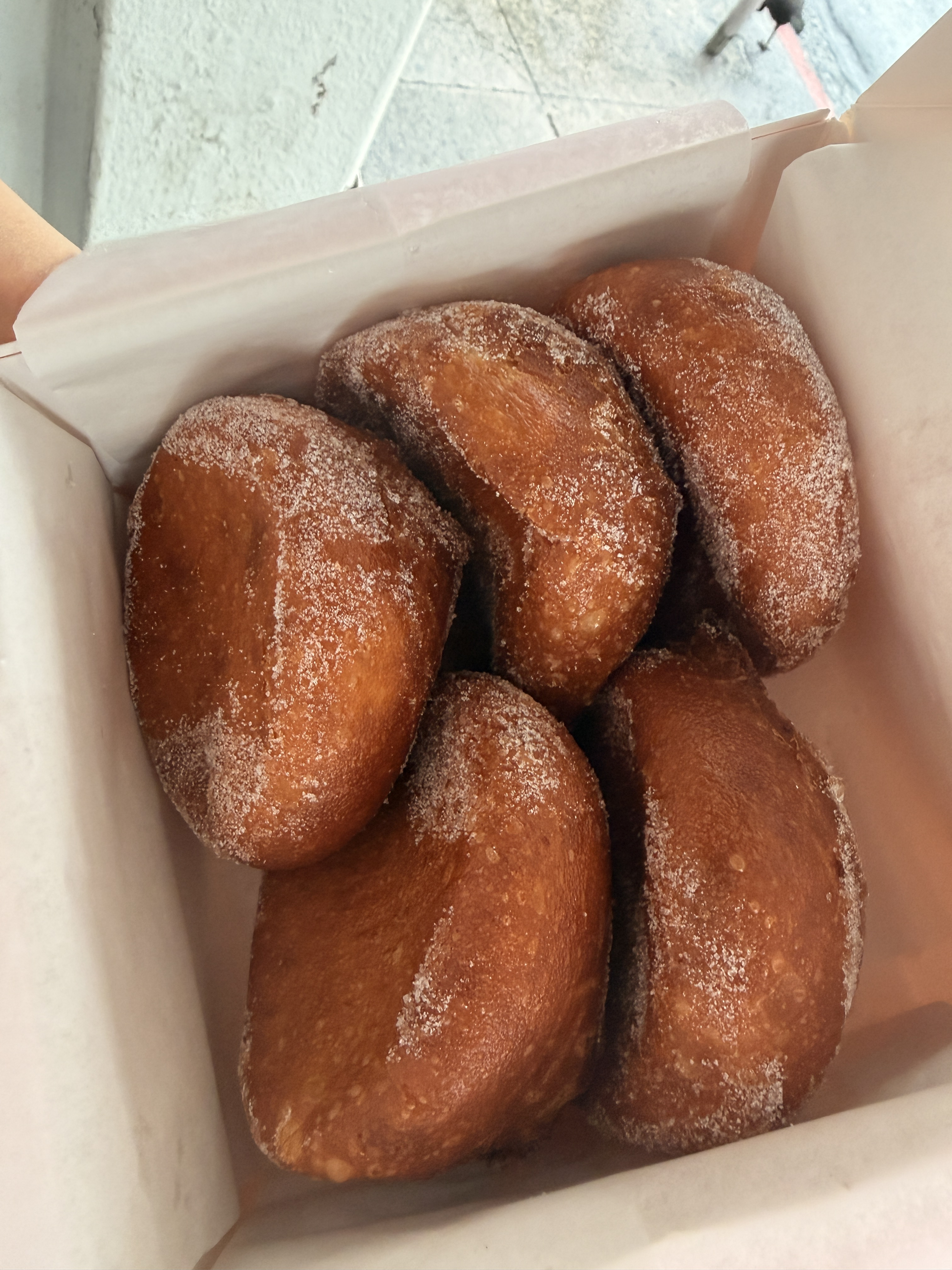
Assortment of Malassadas from Leonard's Bakery

In Hawaii, Fat Tuesday (Mardi Gras) or Shrove Tuesday taking place before Ash Wednesday and Lent is known as "Malasada Day". On this day, people celebrate the last day of eating richer and fatty foods by indulging in desserts. In Hawaii, it is especially popular to celebrate by eating malassadas, causing bakeries to have special hours and extra hands on deck on these days.

Malassadas are quite common in Hawaii's fundraising landscape, as a very popular treat for schools, sports teams, and non-profits to raise money. One example is the Punahou Carnival, hosted by Punahou School, an annual fundraising event featuring rides, food, and games. Malassadas are among the foods sold at the carnival and are prepared by students and faculty in large quantities.

=== North America ===
In the United States, malassadas are cooked in many Azorean Portuguese homes on Fat Tuesday. In some households, older children take the warm doughnuts and roll them in sugar while the eldest woman, mother or grandmother, cooks them. And sometimes, it is a family affair involving men and women.

In Rhode Island and Massachusetts, Portuguese immigrants and Portuguese-Americans make up a large share of the population. Festivals in cities such as Cambridge, New Bedford and Fall River will often serve Portuguese cuisine, including malassadas.

== See also ==
- Sfenj – Maghrebi fried doughnut rings
- Sata andagi – Doughnut-like Japanese dish made from deep fried dough
- Carnival of Madeira
- Filhós – Fried doughnut of Portuguese origin
- Bola de Berlim - Fried doughnut, widely consumed on beaches and the third most popular pastry in Portugal
- Leonard's Bakery – Portuguese bakery in Honolulu, founded in 1952, famous for popularizing the malasada in Hawaii
- Portuguese cuisine – Culinary traditions of Portugal
- Portuguese sweet bread – Various Portuguese sweet breads
