= Leonard's Bakery =

Portuguese bakery in Honolulu, founded in 1952

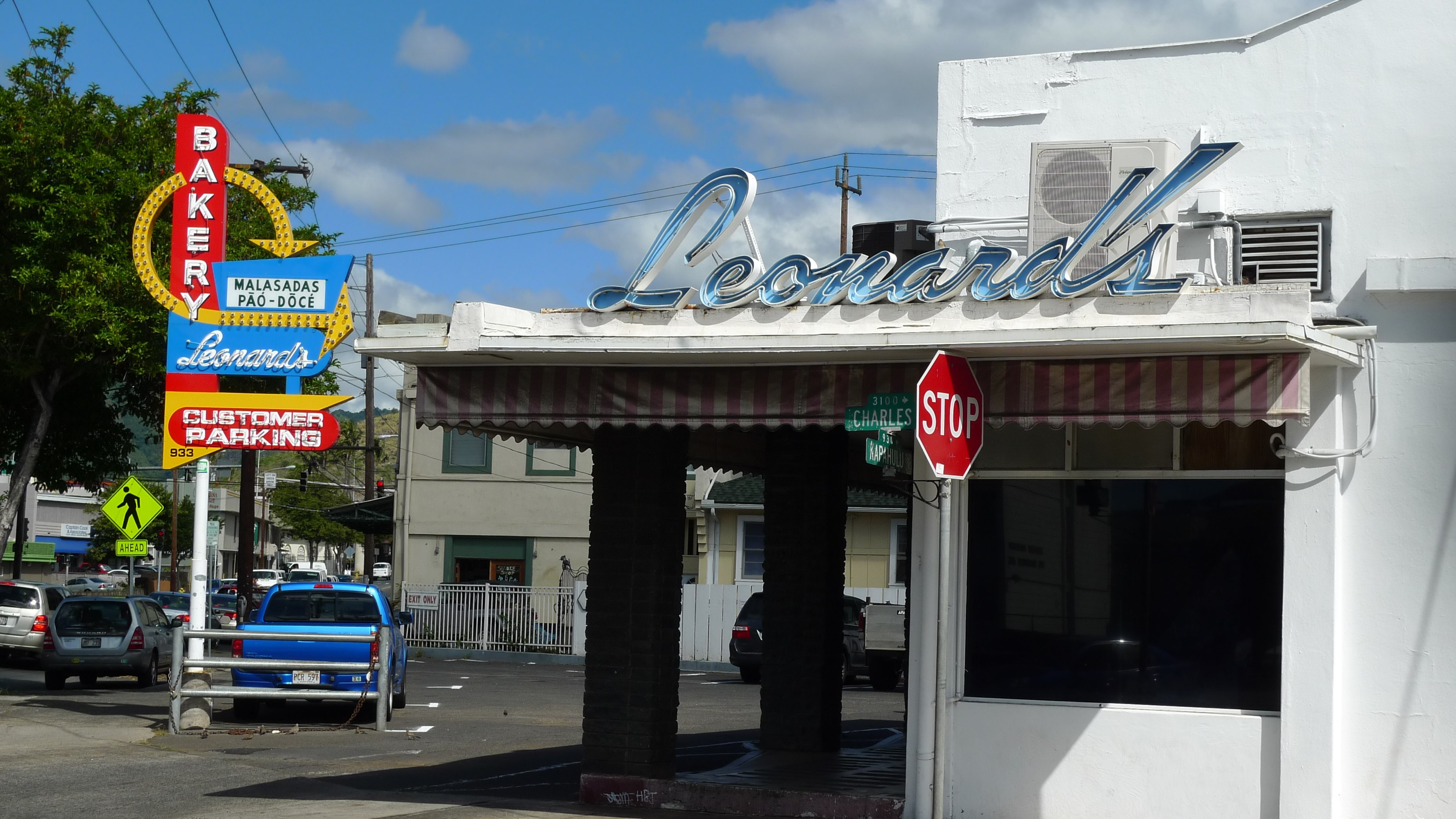
- Interactive map of Leonard's Bakery

Restaurant information
- Established: 1952; 74 years ago
- Owner: Leonard Rego Jr.
- Food type: Bakery
- Location: 933 Kapahulu Avenue, Honolulu, Hawaii, 96816, United States
- Coordinates: 21.2849°N 157.8133°W
- Other locations: Yokohama, Japan
- Website: leonardshawaii.com

Leonard's Bakery is a Portuguese bakery in Honolulu, Hawaii, known for popularizing the malasada. The fried pastry, slightly crispier and chewier than a doughnut and with no hole, is known as a cuisine of Hawaii. Though Portuguese immigrants brought the malasada to Hawaii at the turn of the 20th century, Leonard's opened in 1952 and brought it to a wider audience. Leonard's is a household name in Hawaii and is well known in the continental United States and internationally. A franchise location opened in Japan in 2008.

== Background and history ==
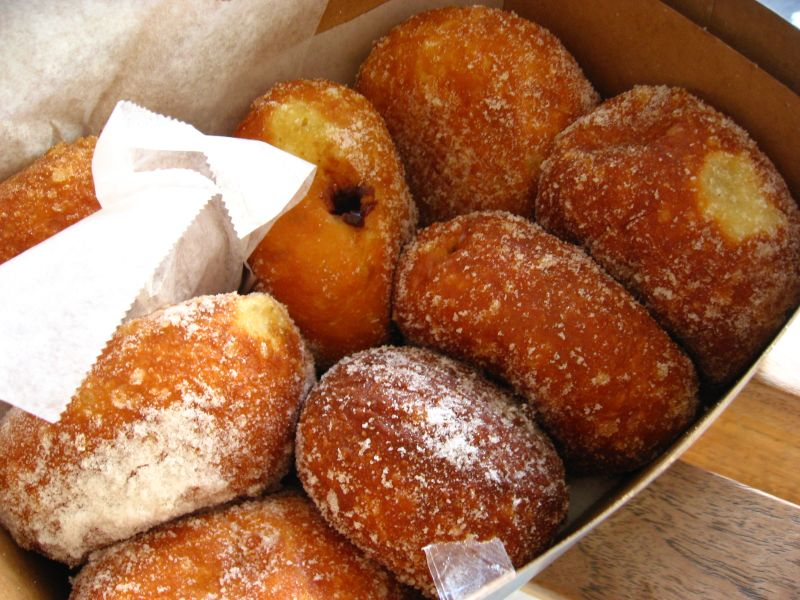
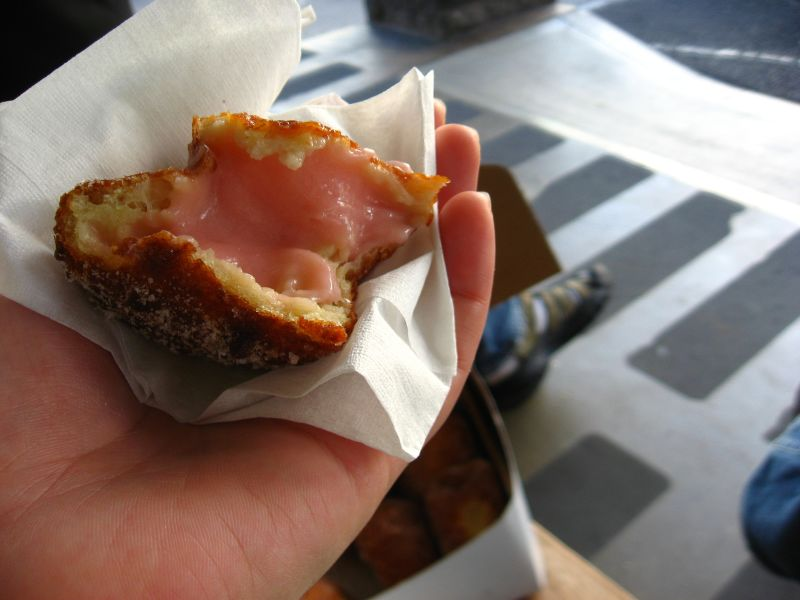
A box of Leonard's malasadas, and the remains of one

Margaret and Frank Leonard Rego Sr. opened Leonard's Bakery in 1952. Rego's mother had encouraged him to sell malasadas, a holeless Portuguese doughnut with a "crispier" outside and a "chewier" inside. Portuguese plantation workers brought the dessert to the Hawaiian Islands when they immigrated at the turn of the 20th century. Leonard's is known as an "old-fashioned, plain-Jane bakery" that popularized pastries and desserts in Portuguese cuisine, like Portuguese sweet bread and pão doce meat wraps, sometimes with a Hawaiian cultural borrowing like haupia, coconut, and guava filled malasadas.

As of 2011, the bakery remains a family business owned by Leonard Rego Jr. whose own children participate in its operation just as he once did.

Andrew McCarthy of the National Geographic Traveler wrote that the bakery is an institution that "anchored" its neighborhood. In Hawaii, Leonard's is a "household name". Residents from the other Hawaiian islands often bring home Leonard's malasadas as an omiyage (souvenir gift). The fried doughnut-like item may be unique to Hawaii, but are well known both in the continental United States and internationally. The Honolulu bakery is a point of interest on at least one island tour. In 2012, the Honolulu Star-Advertiser reported that the bakery sold over 15,000 malasadas daily, or over 160 million since its opening. (Note: By comparison, in 2009, the bakery sold about 12,000 malasadas daily.)

Rego Jr. opened a franchise location in Japan's Yokohama World Quarter Shopping Center in December 2008. The location only sold cinnamon and sugar malasadas at first, but later added malasadas with fillings. Japanese investors Forest Inc. first asked Rego Jr. about licensing the brand in March 2008, and Rego Jr. felt that the timing with the Great Recession "couldn't have been more perfect". The deal was completed three months prior to the opening, and the owner flew in to train the staff for a week and a half. Rego Jr. plans to open more franchised locations in Japan and on the other islands of Hawaii. In 2009, the company employed 60 people between three stores (two in Oahu and one in Yokohama) and two Oahu food trucks.

== Reception ==
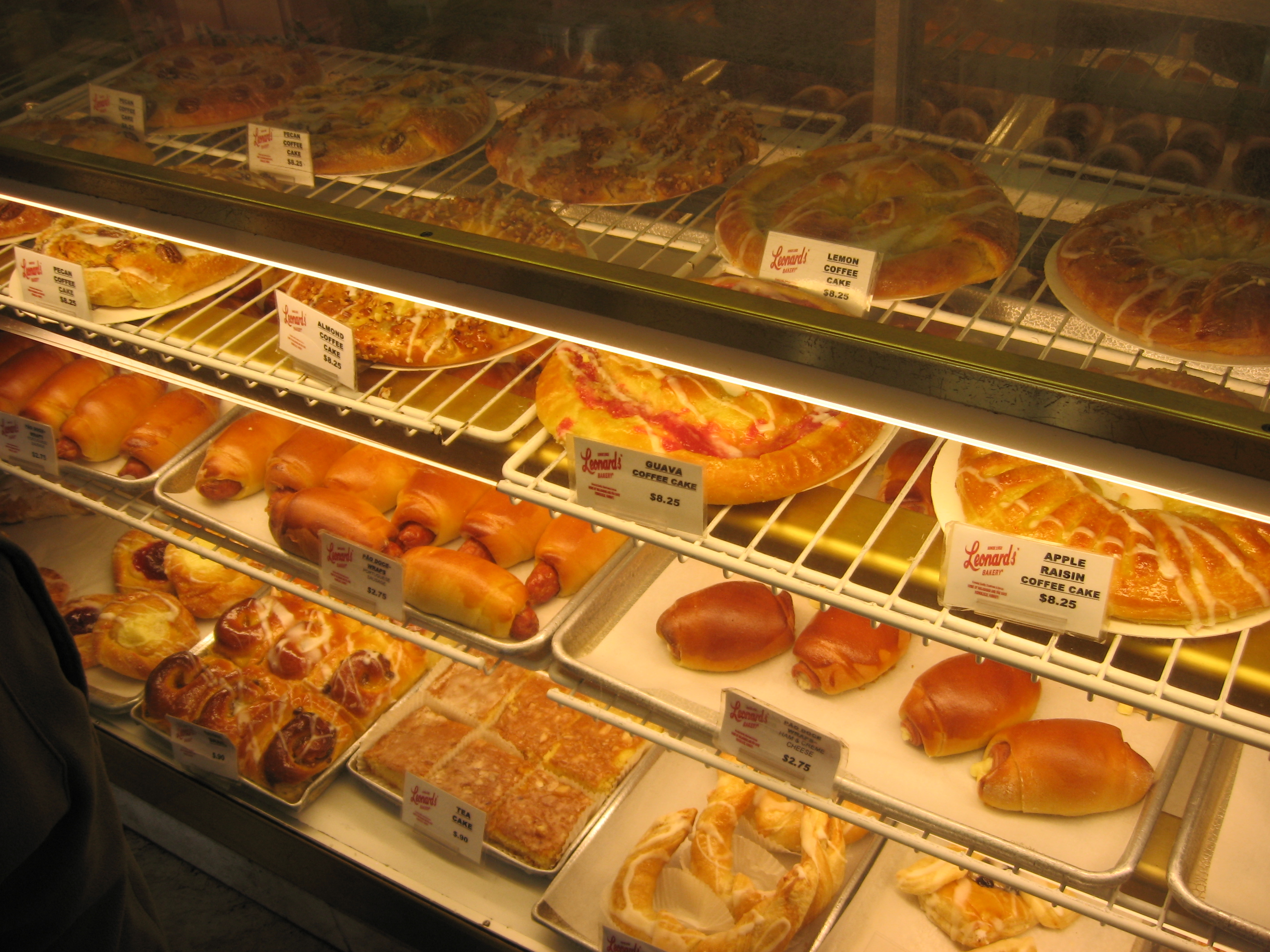
Display case inside the bakery

The bakery's malasadas were Foodspotting's top "Hawaii food find", and USA Today described the doughnuts as having become "a Hawaiian icon". Sunset recognized Leonard's for making the sweet a "Hawaiian classic" that is now served at Honolulu restaurants from drive-ins to Chef Mavro, "the city's classiest restaurant". Vinnee Tong of The New York Sun wrote that Leonard's was "a required stop for foodies and ... dessert addicts".

Frommer's calls it a "Honolulu landmark", and The Huffington Post lists Leonard's malasadas alongside poke, Spam musubi and shave ice as "must try" Hawaiian cuisine experiences. It is also profiled in Mimi Sheraton's critical food book 1,000 Foods to Eat Before You Die, and John T. Edge's Donuts: An American Passion.

== See also ==
- List of bakeries

== Notes and references ==
Notes
