= Morgado =

Surname

Morgado is a surname. Notable people with this surname include:

- António Morgado – (born 2004), Portuguese road cyclist
- Arnold Morgado – (born 1952), American professional football player
- Bruno Morgado – (born 1997), Swiss professional footballer
- Cristiano Morgado – (born 1979), South African race car driver
- Diogo Morgado – (born 1981), Portuguese actor
- Camila Morgado – (born 1975), Brazilian actress
- Ernest Morgado – (1917–2002), Portuguese-American businessman
- Ernesto Morgado – Portuguese computer scientist and software entrepreneur
- Nuria Morgado – Spanish academic
- Roberto Nunes Morgado – (1946–1989), Brazilian football referee
- Tiago Morgado – (born 1993), Portuguese professional footballer
