= Carnival of Madeira =

Annual festival in Madeira

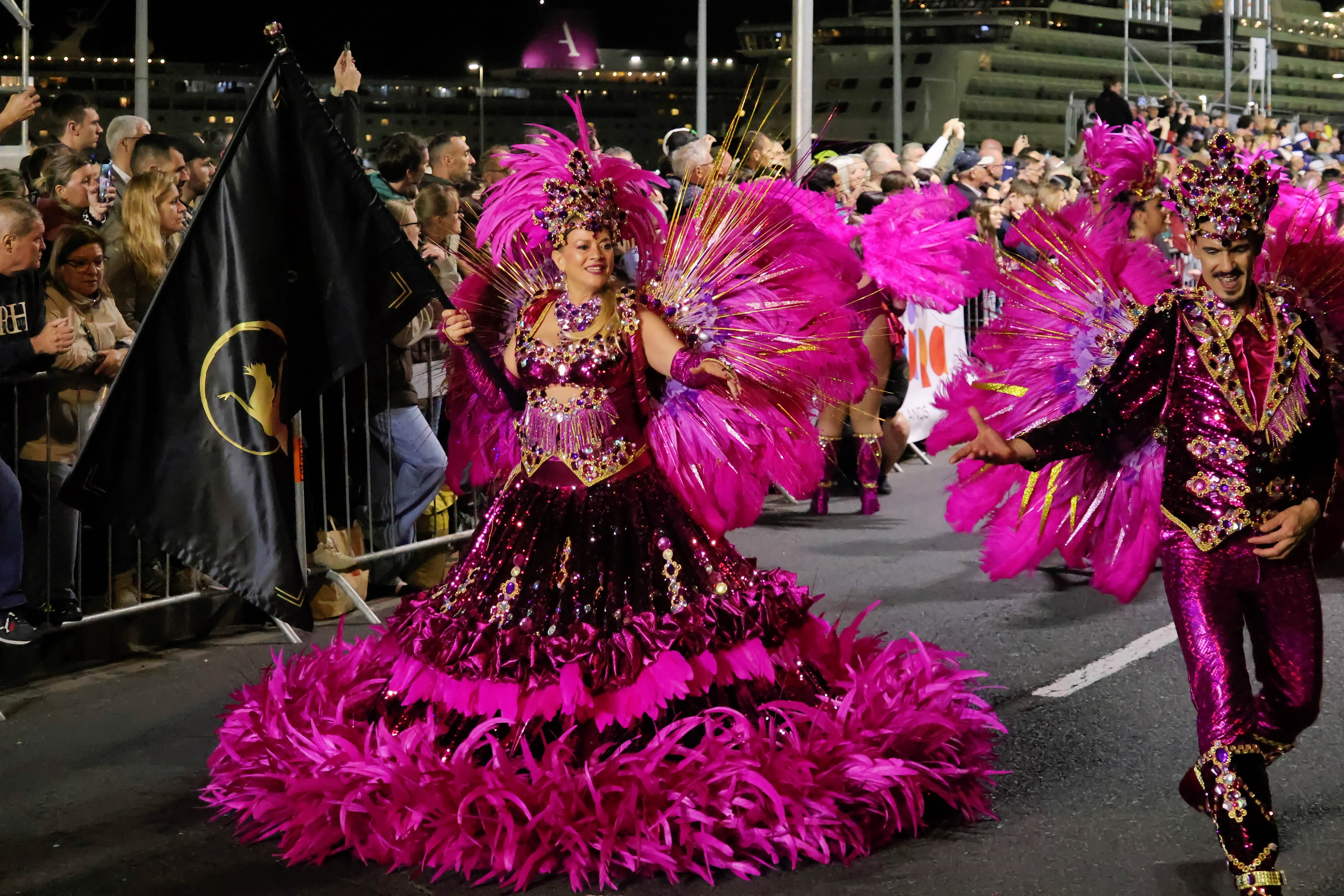
- Dancers in the 2026 carnival of Madeira
- Also called: Carnaval, Carnival, Madeira Carnival
- Observed by: Madeira, Madeirense communities worldwide
- Type: Cultural, Religious (Roman Catholicism)
- Significance: Five days before Ash Wednesday
- Date: Easter − 47 days
- Duration: 5 days
- Frequency: annual
- Related to: Ash Wednesday, Valentine's Day, Lent, Carnival

The Carnival of Madeira (Portuguese: Carnaval da Madeira) is an annual festival held forty days before Easter, that ends on Shrove Tuesday (called Fat Tuesday in Madeira - Terça-feira Gorda in Portuguese) the day before Ash Wednesday (first day of Lent). On certain days of Lent, Roman Catholics traditionally abstained from the consumption of meat and poultry, hence the term "carnival," from carnelevare, "to remove (literally, "raise") meat."

== Organization ==
One of the first major festivals of the year in Madeira, apart from the Dia dos Reis, the Madeira carnival is known as one of the best in Europe. Traditionally, there are two main carnival parades in Madeira, which are very different from each other. The allegoric parade, which takes place always on the Saturday of the Carnival weekend, is the more sophisticated one and needs a great deal of commitment and organisation from all the groups and the people involved. Numerous samba groups with thousands of participants in magnificent and colourful costumes dance to electrifying samba music through the streets of Funchal, spreading an ambiance evoking the Rio Carnival.

The second parade, called ‘trapalhão’, is older and used to occur all over the island, now it floods the streets of the city centre with thrilling joy on Terça-feira Gorda, ending the Carnival period. In this parade everybody can take part and the – sometimes quite daring – costumes and depicted caricatures are left to the participants’ own imagination.

Both parades have a defined itinerary in the city centre and end at the Municipal Square (Praça do Município) where more entertainment with live music and costume competitions is provided.

At least one month before the Carnival peak time the best-known and established Carnival groups visit the hotels and entertain the guests with dance and music performances.

During the 19th century people from Madeira emigrated to Hawaii and took the tradition of Malasadas on Terça-feira Gorda (Shrove Tuesday) with them, now it is called Malasada Day in Hawaii.

Traditionally the people of Madeira eat Malasadas on Terça-feira Gorda (Shrove Tuesday), the reason for making malasadas was to use up all the lard and sugar in the house, in preparation for Lent (much in the same way the tradition of Pancake Day in the UK originated on Shrove Tuesday), Malasadas are sold alongside the main carnival parade on Saturday and on the last one, the trapalhão on Terça-feira Gorda (Shrove Tuesday).

Arguably, the Brazilian Carnival could be historically traced to the period of the Portuguese Age of Discoveries when their caravels passed regularly through Madeira, a territory which already celebrated emphatically its carnival season, and where they were loaded with goods but also people and their ludic and cultural expressions who then lend them to what would become the biggest cultural manifestation in modern Brazil.

== Themes of the Saturday Parades ==
- 1999 - 20th Century: was a retrospective look at various aspects of the 20th century, costumes etc.
- 2000 - Millennium Fantasies: was a look towards to the future, costumes etc.
- 2010 - Seas and Oceans: Celebrating the life given to Madeira via seas and oceans
- 2011 - Magical Forest: Wednesday 2 March - Tuesday 8 March, the main carnival celebrated magical forests.
- 2012 - Signs of the Zodiac: Wednesday 15 February - Tuesday 21 February, celebrated the signs of the Zodiac
- 2013 - Madeira Magical Moments: Wednesday 6 February - Tuesday 12 February
- 2014 - Madeira Sparkling Carnival: Wednesday 26 February - Tuesday 4 March
- 2015 - Magic of Light: Wednesday 11 February to Wednesday 18 February
- 2016 - Carnival of Dreams: Wednesday February 3 to Wednesday 10 February
- 2017 - The Great Gatsby: Wednesday February 22 to Wednesday March 1
- 2018 - Madeira – 6 centuries of joy: Wednesday February 7 to Sunday February 18
- 2019 - Madeira – 600 years discoverying revelry: Wednesday February 26 to Sunday March 10
- 2020 - Carnival in Fantasy (Portuguese: Carnaval em Fantasia): Wednesday February 19 to Sunday March 1

== See also ==
- Malasada
