= Sata andagi =

Doughnut-like Japanese dish made from deep fried dough

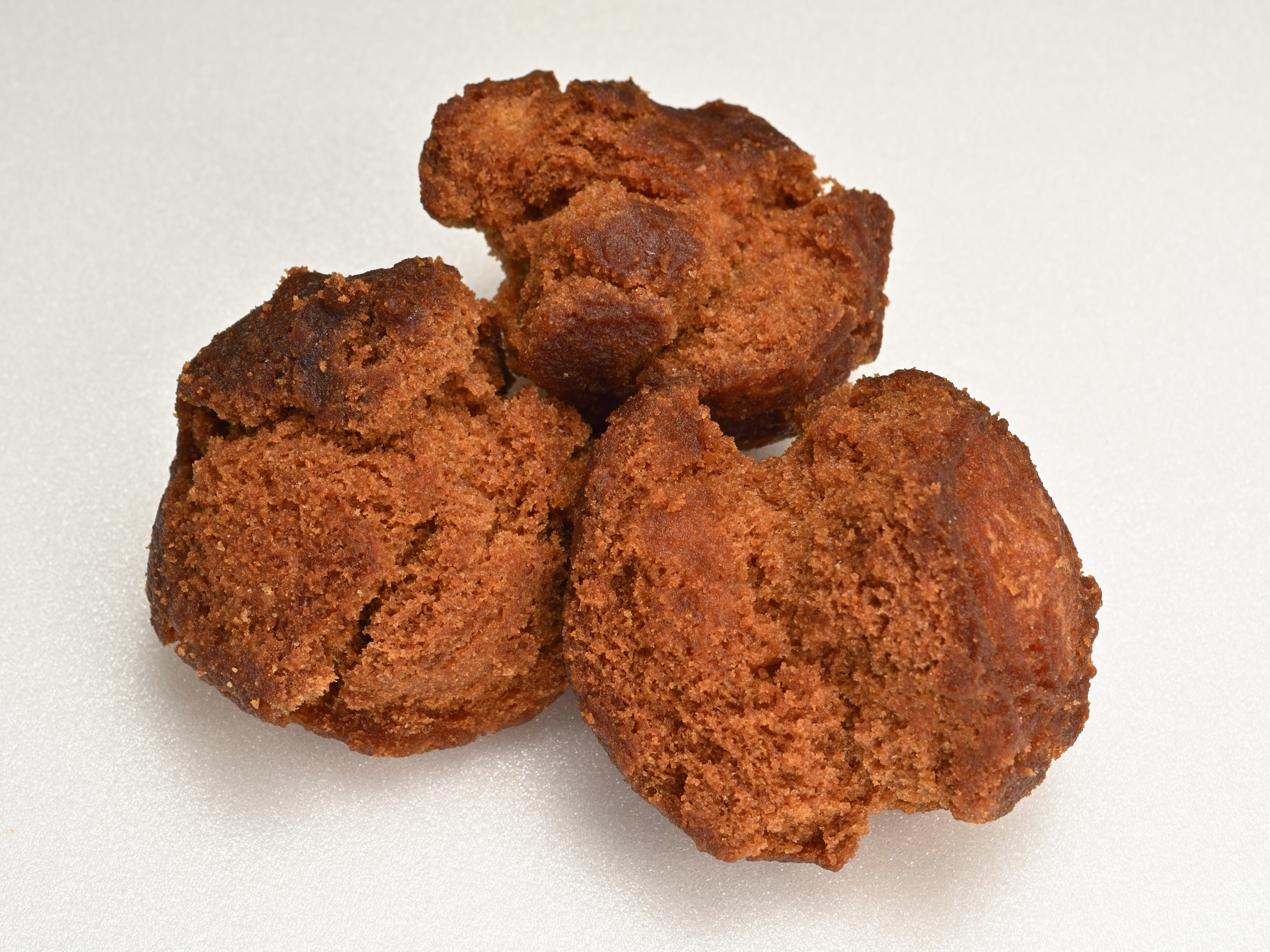
- A finished batch of sata andagi
- Type: Fried dough
- Place of origin: China; Netherlands
- Region or state: South China, Okinawa
- Main ingredients: Flour, sugar and eggs

Sata andagi (サーターアンダーギー, sātā andāgī) are sweet deep fried buns of dough similar to doughnuts (or the Portuguese malassada, or the Dutch oliebollen), native to Southern China, there named sa-yung (Chinese: 沙翁; pinyin: shāwēng; Jyutping: saa¹ jung¹; Cantonese Yale: sā yūng), then spread to Okinawa Islands. They are also popular in Hawaii because the Ryukyuan diaspora, sometimes known there simply as andagi and Palau where they are known as tama. Sata andagi is made by mixing flour, sugar and eggs. The ingredients are mixed into a ball and deep fried.

In its Okinawan, Saataa means "sugar", while andaagii means "deep fried" ("oil" (anda) + "fried" (agii)) in Okinawan (satō and abura-age in Japanese.) It is also known as saataa andagii and saataa anragii. Incidentally, on Miyako Island, this is called Satapambin (さたぱんびん), pambin means "fried" in Miyakoan language.

Sata andagi are a part of Okinawan cuisine. Like most confectionery from the Ryukyu Islands, the techniques for making them are descended from a combination of Chinese and Japanese techniques. They are typically prepared so that the outside is crispy and browned while the inside is light and cake-like.

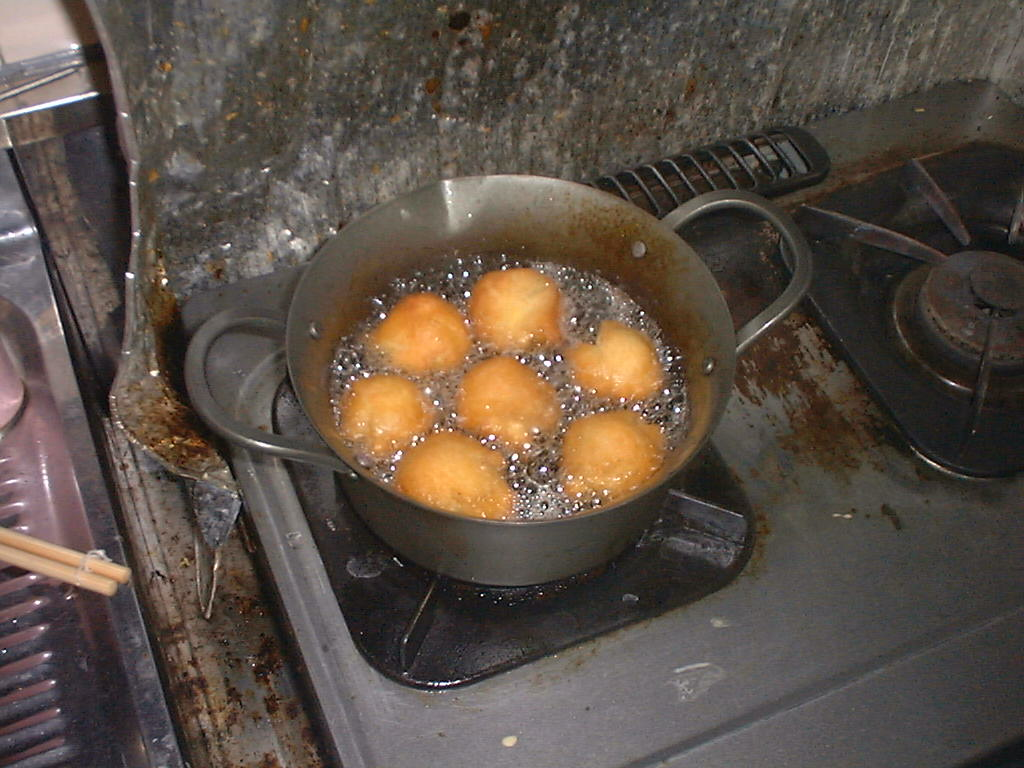
A batch of sata andagi being deep fried

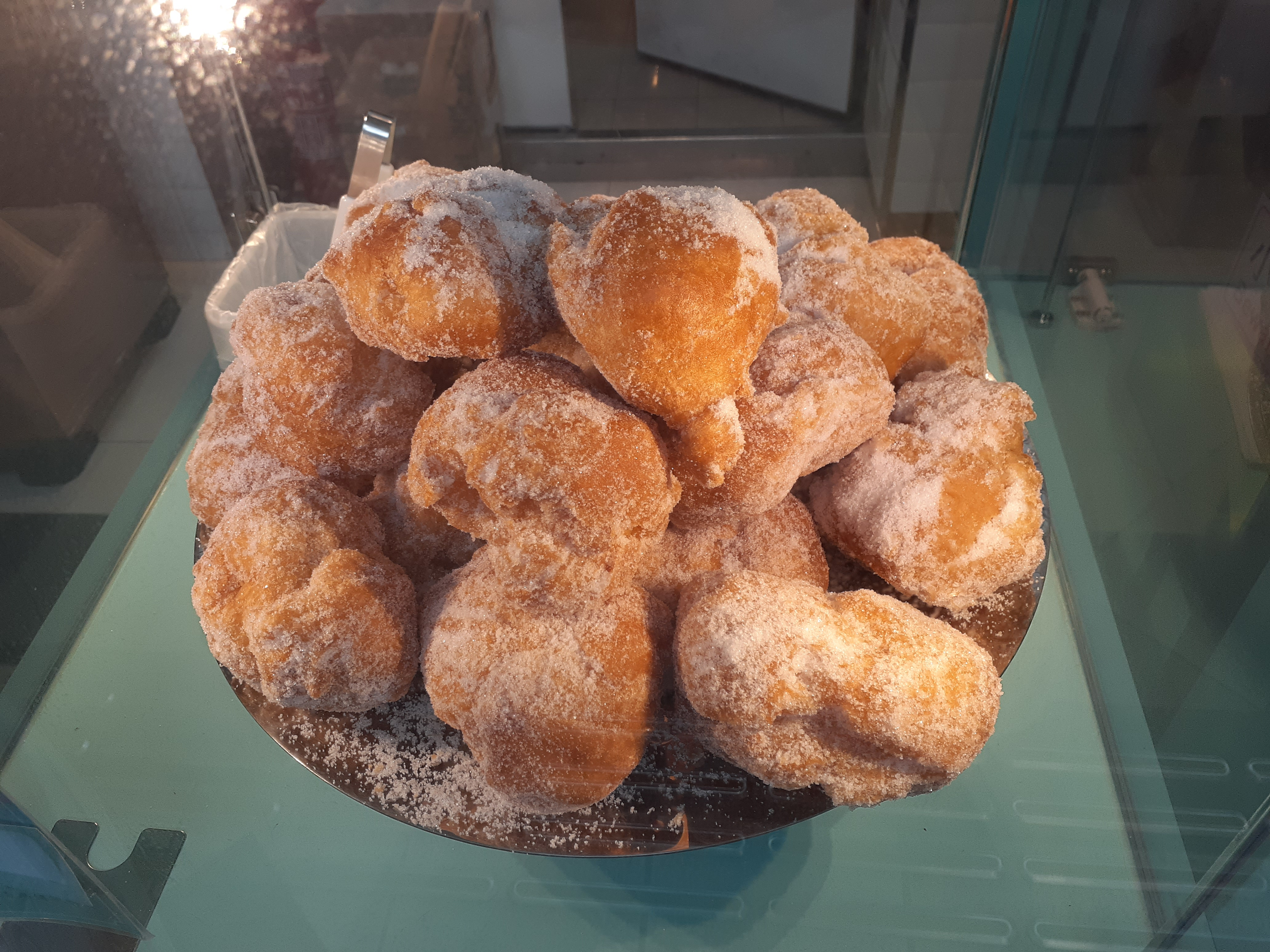
A plate of sa-yung in Hong Kong

== In popular culture ==
A scene from Azumanga Daioh and its anime adaptation has the character Ayumu "Osaka" Kasuga repeating the phrase, "Sata andagi!" The scene became an internet meme within the anime and manga community.

== See also ==
- List of doughnut varieties
- List of fried dough varieties
