= Ganmodoki =

Tofu fritter made with vegetables

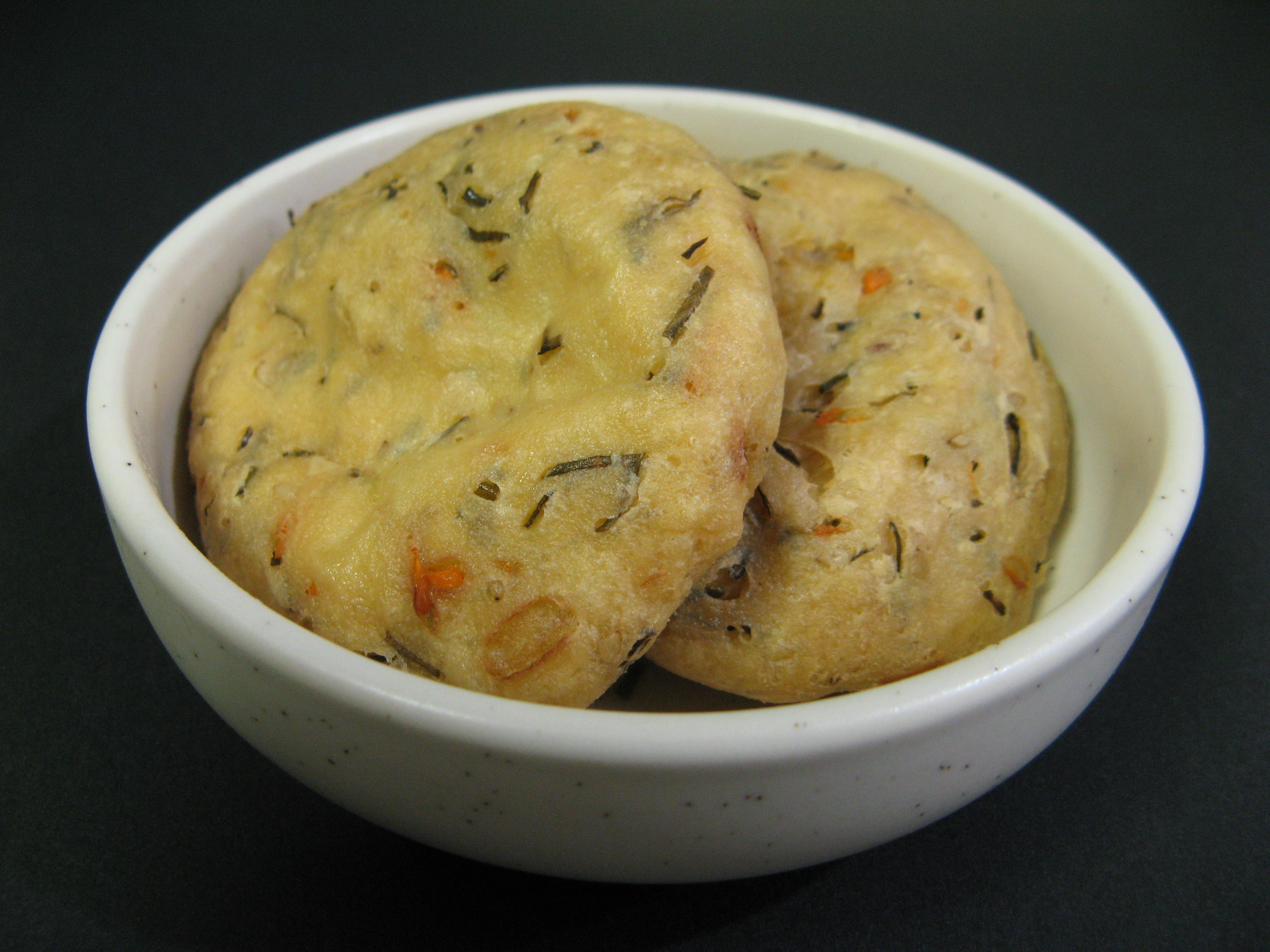
- Alternative names: がんもどき
- Type: Fritter
- Place of origin: Japan
- Main ingredients: Tofu
- Ingredients generally used: Carrots, lotus roots and burdock

Ganmodoki (がんもどき, 雁擬き) is a fried tofu fritter made with vegetables, such as carrots, lotus roots and burdock. It may also contain egg. Ganmodoki means pseudo-goose (gan (がん, 雁) + pseudo (もどき)). This is because ganmodoki is said to taste like goose; compare mock turtle soup. Ganmodoki is also called ganmo for short.

In the Edo period, ganmodoki was a stir-fried konjac dish. A dish similar to the ganmodoki today was made by wrapping chopped up vegetables in tofu (much like a manjū) and deep frying it.

In Western Japan, Ganmodoki is called hiryōzu, hiryuzu or hirōsu, from the Portuguese word filhós or Spanish fillos.

== Gallery ==
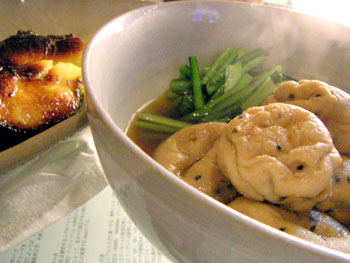
Ganmodoki (right)

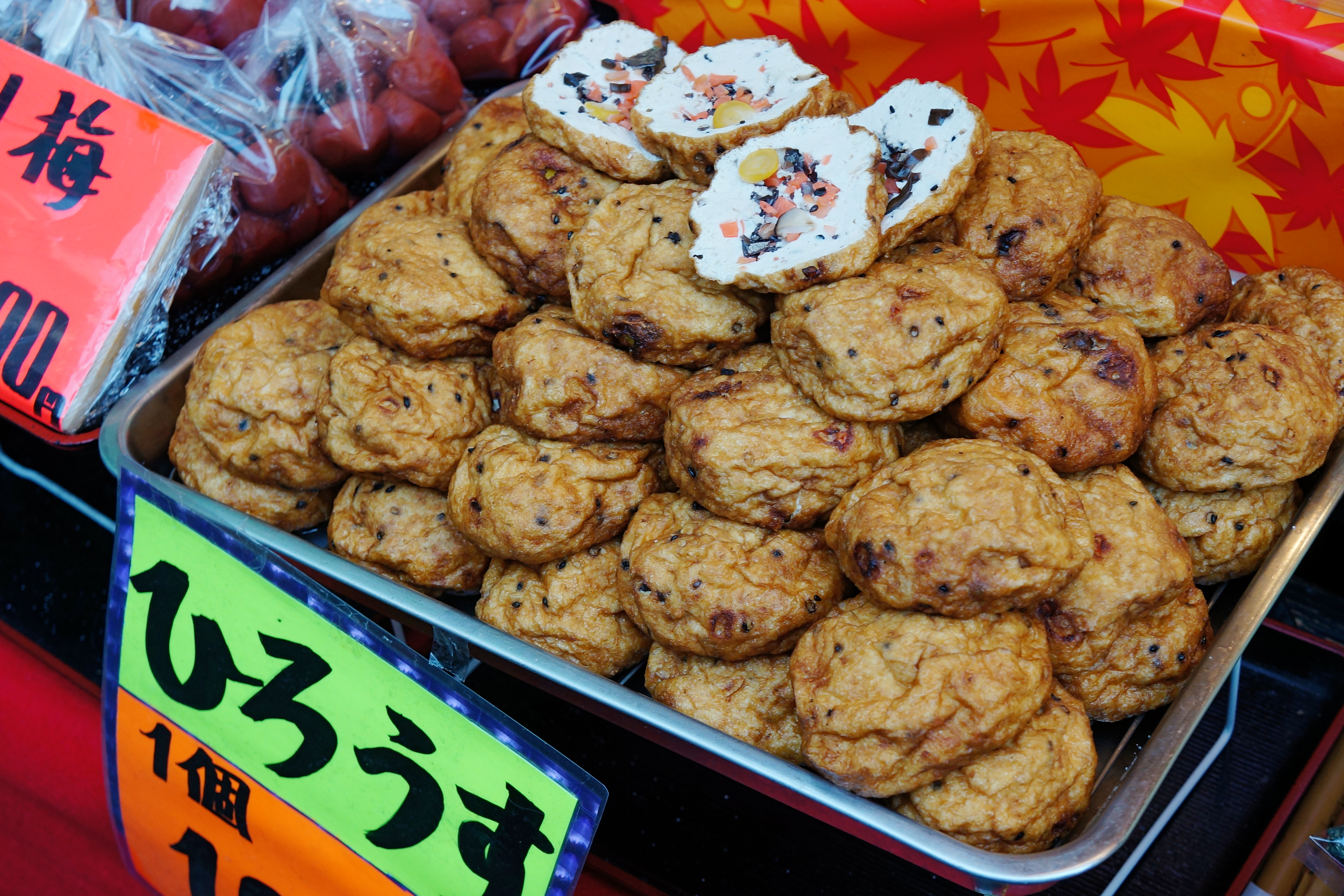

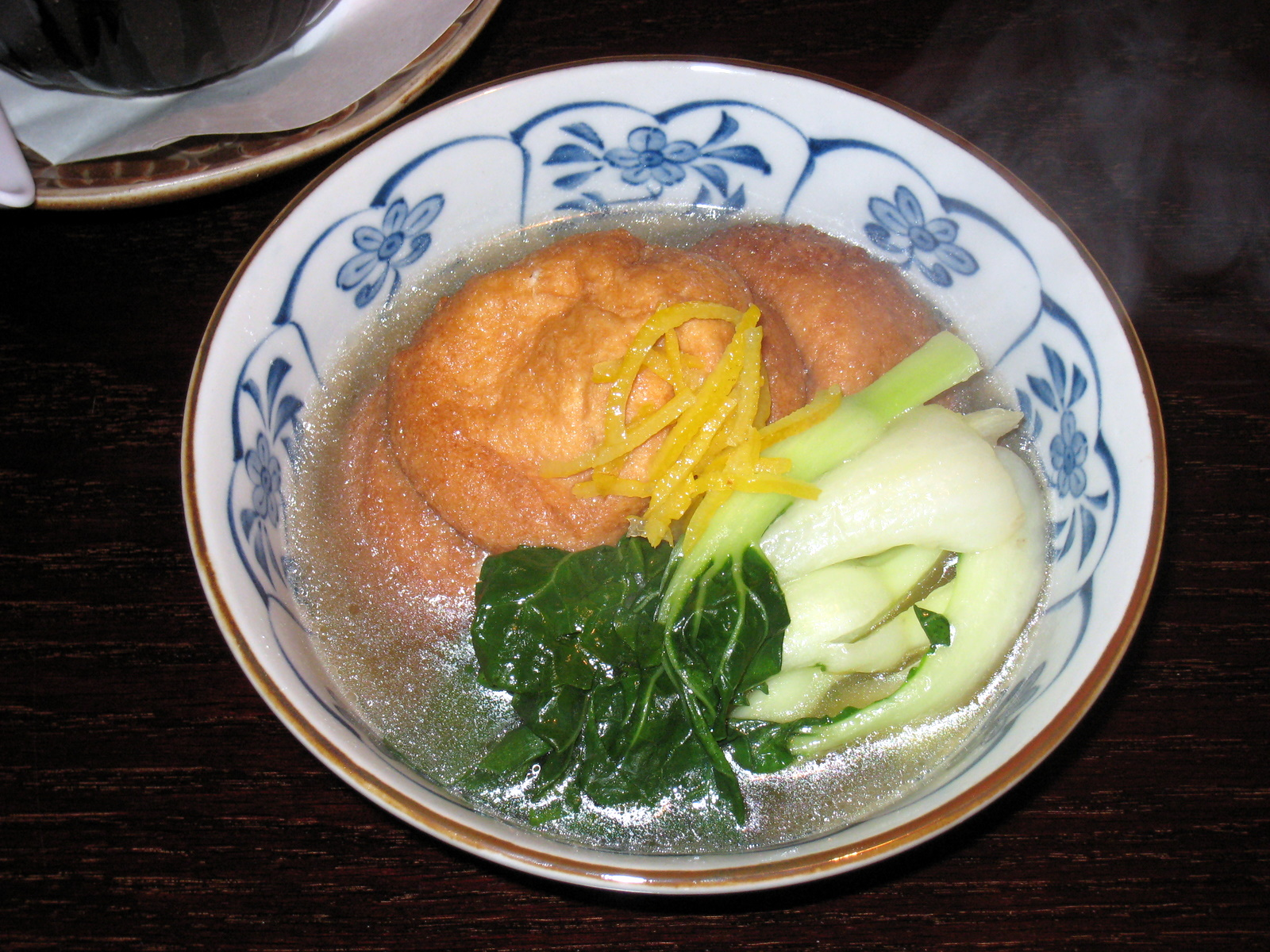

== See also ==
- Oden
- List of tofu dishes
