= Ravenscraig Castle (disambiguation) =

Ravenscraig Castle may refer to

- Ravenscraig Castle, Kirkcaldy, Scotland, built in the 15th century
- Ravenscraig Castle, Aberdeenshire, Scotland, built in the 15th century
- Ravens' Craig Castle, Lochalsh, Scotland, tower house built by Ian Begg in 1992

== See also ==
- Ravenscraig (disambiguation)
