= Filhó =

Fried doughnut of Portuguese origin

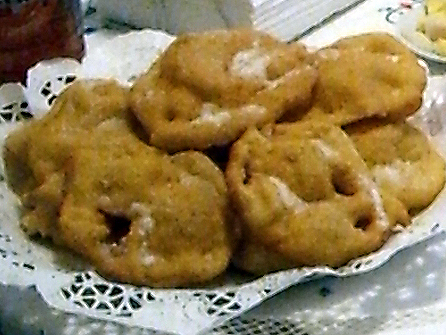
- Type: Doughnut
- Course: Dessert
- Place of origin: Portugal
- Main ingredients: Flour, eggs, sugar, cinnamon

A filhó (Note: Portuguese pronunciation: [fiˈʎɔ]; pl.: filhós, pronounced [fiˈʎɔʃ]) is a traditional doughnut in Portugal and Northeastern Brazil.

Filhós are usually made by forming balls from a mixture of flour and eggs. When the dough has risen, the balls are deep-fried and sprinkled with a mixture of sugar and cinnamon. This is a traditional Christmas bake in Portugal, although it is now commercialised throughout the year. Although there is not a specific place of origin, this sweet has strong roots in the inland regions of central Northern Portugal.

== Etymology ==
The Portuguese word filhó originates from the Latin word foliola, the plural form of foliolum, which is in turn a diminutive of folium ('leaf'); thus, it is cognate with the English word folio but not the similarly-spelled Portuguese word filho ('son'), which comes from Latin fīlius (also 'son').

== See also ==
- List of doughnut varieties
- Ganmodoki – Tofu fritter made with vegetables
- Malassada – Portuguese-style fried doughnut, from the Azores
