= SS Earl Dalhausie =

19th-century sailing ship

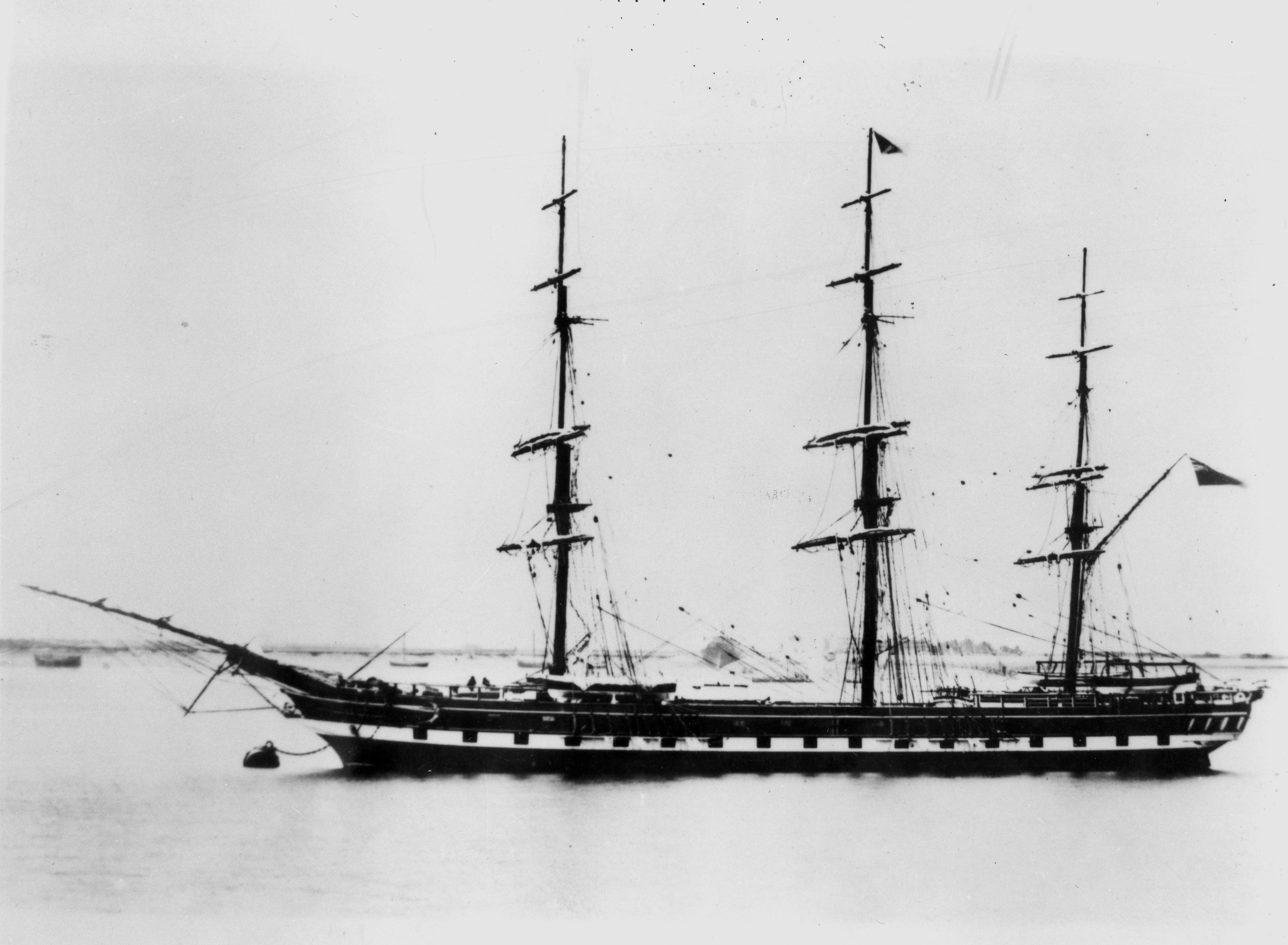
Photograph of the Earl Dalhousie from the State Library of Queensland.

The Earl Dalhousie is a full-rigged sailing ship, built in 1862, that transported British settlers in the 1870s to Australia. It was the fifth ship to participate in the Portuguese immigration to Hawaii when it brought contract laborers in 1882 from the Azores Islands to work on the Hawaiian sugarcane plantations.

== See also ==
- Portuguese immigration to Hawaii
- Immigration to Australia
