= Huli-huli chicken =

Hawaiian chicken dish

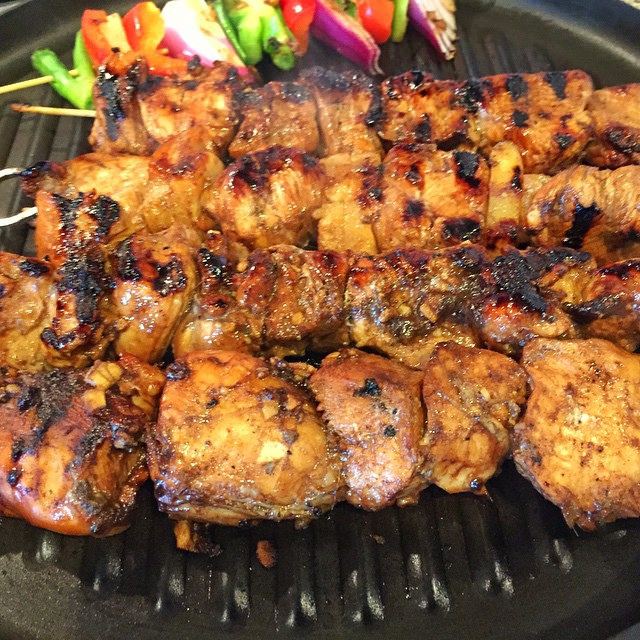
- Huli-huli chicken skewers
- Course: entrée
- Place of origin: Hawaii
- Created by: Ernest Morgado; Mike Asagi
- Invented: 1955; 71 years ago
- Main ingredients: chicken, pineapple, ginger, soy sauce
- Ingredients generally used: ketchup, sugar, sesame oil, garlic

Huli-huli chicken is a grilled chicken dish in Hawaiian cuisine, prepared by barbecuing a chicken on a revolving spit (in Hawaiian: hulihuli reduplicated from huli 'turn') over mesquite wood, and basting it with a sweet huli-huli sauce.

== History ==
In 1954, Ernest Morgado, a naval intelligence officer during World War II, and Mike Asagi, a chicken farmer, founded the Pacific Poultry Company in ʻEwa, Hawaii. The next year, at a meeting with farmers, Morgado and Asagi first barbecued chicken in a teriyaki-like sauce, Morgado's mother's recipe. After seeing its popularity, Morgado began cooking huli-huli chicken at fundraisers. Millions of dollars have been raised over the years for charities by selling huli-huli chicken, according to Morgado's stepson. Fundraisers at churches and schools selling huli-huli chicken were common around Hawaii for many years.

As the dish was originally made on a grill with a makeshift spit, onlookers shouted huli ("turn" in Hawaiian) when the chickens were to be rotated, cooking and basting the other side. Morgado, through the Pacific Poultry Company, trademarked "huli-huli" in 1967.

Morgado became famous with his huli-huli chicken recipe. He served on the Hawaii Board of Agriculture, was appointed honorary vice consul of Portugal, and was awarded the Honolulu Portuguese Chamber of Commerce's "Council's Cup" in 1981. Later, beginning in 1986, Morgado bottled and sold huli-huli sauce in stores.

Today, huli-huli chicken can be found around Hawaii, in restaurants, road-side stands, mini-marts and drive-ins. At many locations, chicken are cooked on racks en masse and sold.

== Preparation ==
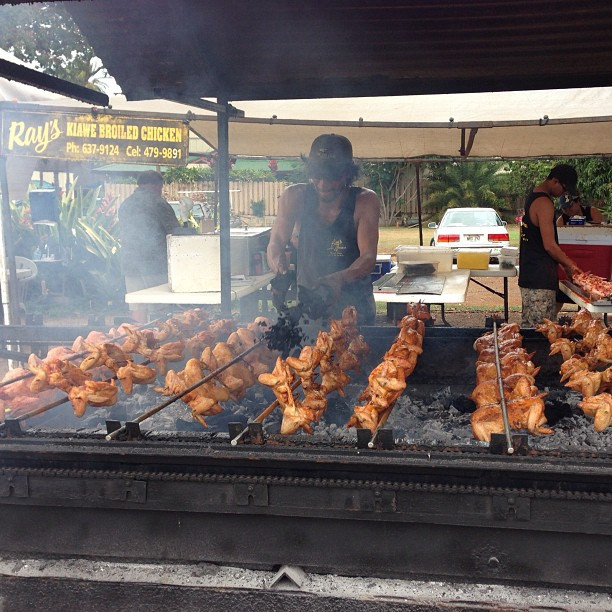
Cooking huli-huli chicken en masse on an outdoor grill

Morgado never released his huli-huli sauce recipe, though other chefs have made approximations.

Most recipes call for a glaze or sauce with ingredients including pineapple juice, ketchup, soy sauce, honey or brown sugar, sesame oil, ginger, and garlic. Some recipes may call for lemon juice, Worcestershire sauce, Sriracha or red pepper flakes, rice wine or sherry vinegar, chicken broth, white wine, or mustard. Some recipes call for brining the chicken in a solution with kosher salt, sugar, bay leaves, garlic, sesame oil, or thyme, before marinating it in the sauce.

The chicken can be cooked on a grill or a rotisserie. While cooking, it is regularly basted with the glaze, and turned over ("huli-ed"). Mesquite (kiawe) wood chips are traditionally used to add a smoky flavor.

== See also ==
- List of chicken dishes
- Rotisserie chicken
