= Ernest Morgado =

- Born: Ernest Frank Morgado; 1917; Hilo, Hawaii
- Died: November 5, 2002 (aged 85); Honolulu, Hawaii, U.S.
- Known for: Creating huli-huli chicken
- Spouse: Norma May
- Children: 3

Ernest Frank Morgado (1917 – November 5, 2002) was a Portuguese-American businessman and community leader known for creating huli-huli chicken.

== Early life ==
Ernest Frank Morgado was born in 1917 in Hilo, Hawaii, a second-generation Portuguese ancestry from Azores. He graduated from Saint Louis School in Kaimuki, Hawaii, and served as a chief petty officer in naval intelligence during World War II.

== Career ==
After the war, Morgado built the first mechanized feed manufacturing facility in the Philippines. As president of Hawaii Grain Corp. in the 1960s, Morgado oversaw the development of the first grain elevator in Honolulu.

From 1974 to 1981, he served on the Hawaii Board of Agriculture. Morgado co-founded the Portuguese Chamber of Commerce in 1977 with city councilman John Henry Felix. He entered the Guinness Book of World Records for the largest chicken barbecue, cooking 46,386 halves at a fundraiser for ʻIolani School in 1981.

=== Huli-huli chicken ===
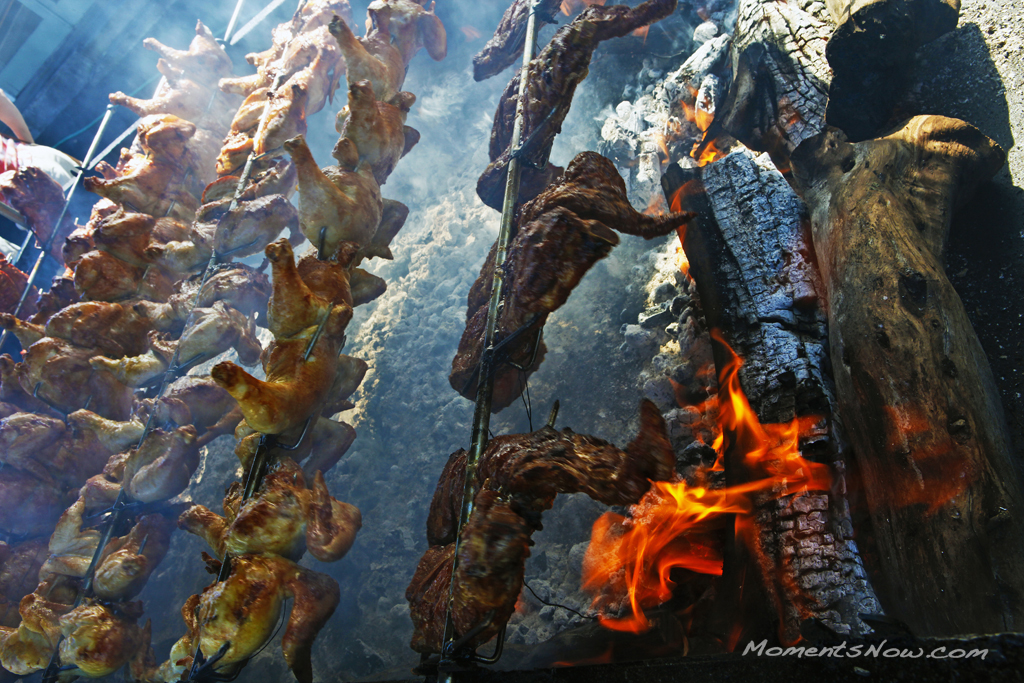
Huli-huli pork and chicken roasting on an open flame and coals

With chicken farmer Mike Asagi, Morgado founded the Pacific Poultry Company in 1954. They served barbecued chicken – marinated in a teriyaki-like sauce, his mother's recipe – at farm bureau meetings starting in 1955. His chicken recipe became popular, and he began selling it at private functions and fundraisers, and later in Europe, Japan, and the contiguous United States.

The chicken was cooked between two grills, and when one half was done, someone would shout "huli", the Hawaiian word for turn. Morgado registered the trademark "huli-huli" with the Territory of Hawaii in 1958 and the federal government in 1965. He first sold it bottled in stores in 1986, and though he never published a recipe, many people have come up with their own, inspired by the original sauce.

== Personal life ==
The Honolulu Portuguese Chamber of Commerce awarded the "Council's Cup" to Morgado in 1981. For many years, he was a member of the Outrigger Canoe Club in Honolulu.

Until his death at age 85, on November 5, 2002, Morgado served as honorary vice consul to Portugal. He was proud of his Portuguese heritage and recounted the history of the Portuguese in Hawaii when he traveled to mainland Portugal, the Azores, and Madeira. He was married to Norma Fay for 54 years, and had three children, Jaren, Brent, and Kathleen, as well as eight grandchildren and 12 great-grandchildren.
