= Convent of the Incarnation (Lisbon) =

Former convent in Lisbon, Portugal

- Convento da Encarnação
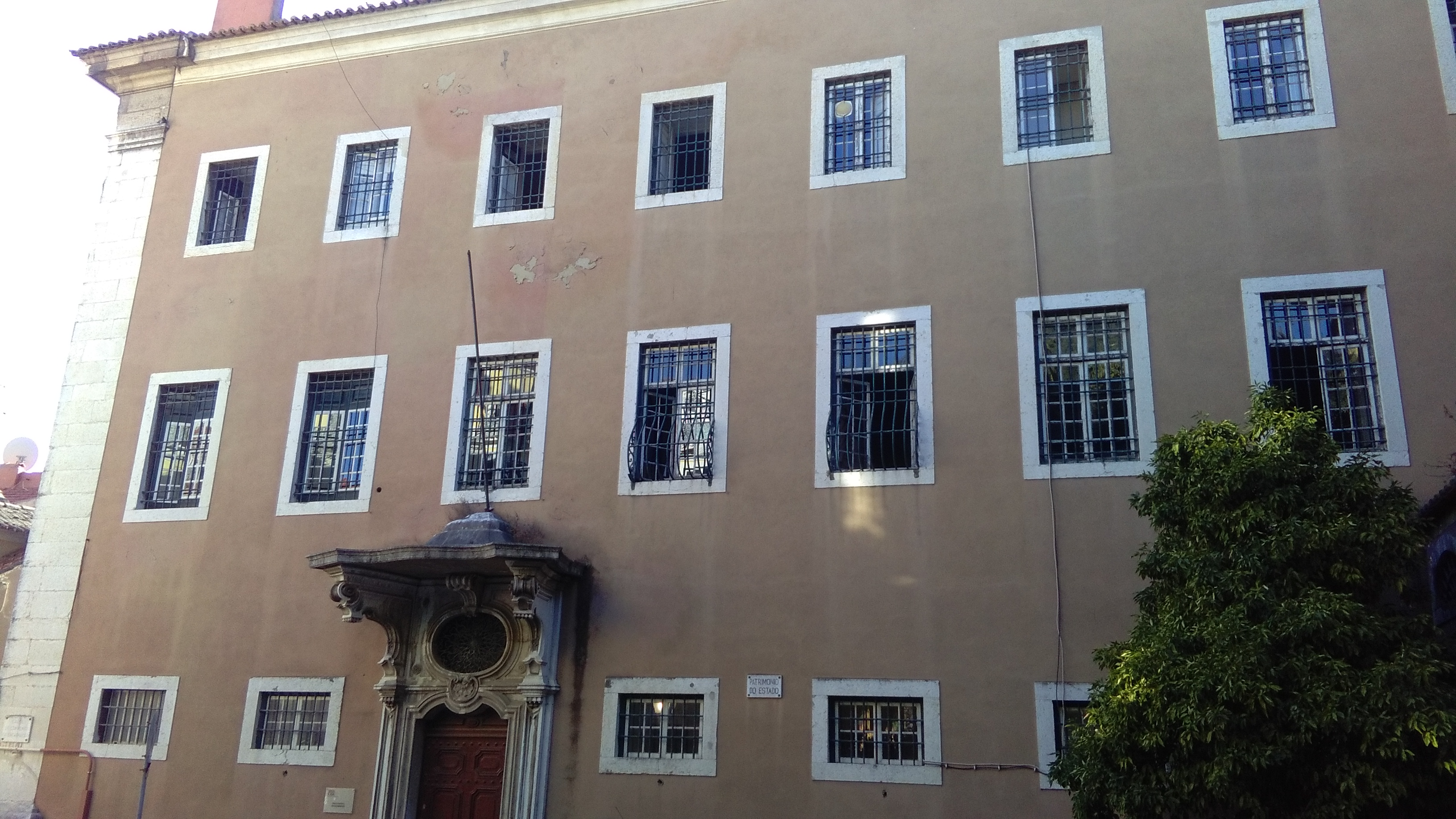
- The Coat of Arms of the founder is found on the facade of the building, "D. Maria, daughter of Manuel."

- Location within Lisbon
- Alternative names: Mosteiro da Encarnação das Comendadeiras de São Bento de Avis

General information
- Type: Convent
- Location: Arroios, Lisbon, Portugal
- Coordinates: 38°42′59.2″N 9°8′20.7″W
- Owner: Portuguese Republic

The Convent of the Incarnation (Portuguese: Convento da Encarnação), also known as the Monastery of the Incarnation of the Commandery of St. Benedict of Avis (Portuguese: Mosteiro da Encarnação das Comendadeiras de São Bento de Avis), is a former convent, constructed in 1630, and located in the parish of Arroios, Lisboa, Portugal. Since 1996, it has been classified as a “Property of Public Interest” in Portugal.

== Background ==
The convent was constructed in 1630, during the reign of Philip II of Portugal, on land that belonged to Aleixo de Meneses. The Commandery of the Military Order of St. Benedict of Avis initially used the site as a meeting house. Later in 1643, the Brothers of the Slaves of the Blessed Sacrament began operating in the convent church. In 1734, the convent was damaged by a fire. After the 1755 Lisbon earthquake destroyed significant portions of the structure, rebuilding began, and the convent was restored and reoccupied in 1758.

After the expulsion of religious orders in 1834, the building was occupied by the Honorary Commanders of the Order of Avis until the establishment of the Portuguese Republic on October 5 1910.

== Sources ==
- SANTANA, Francisco e SUCENA, Eduardo (dir.), Dicionário da História de Lisboa, 1.ª ed., Sacavém, Carlos Quintas & Associados – Consultores, 1994, pp. 336–338.
- Monastery of Our Lady of the Incarnation is in the SIPA database Direção-Geral do Património Cultural
- Convent of the Incarnation, including the church, is in the Ulysses database of the Direção-Geral do Património Cultural
