= SV Highflyer =

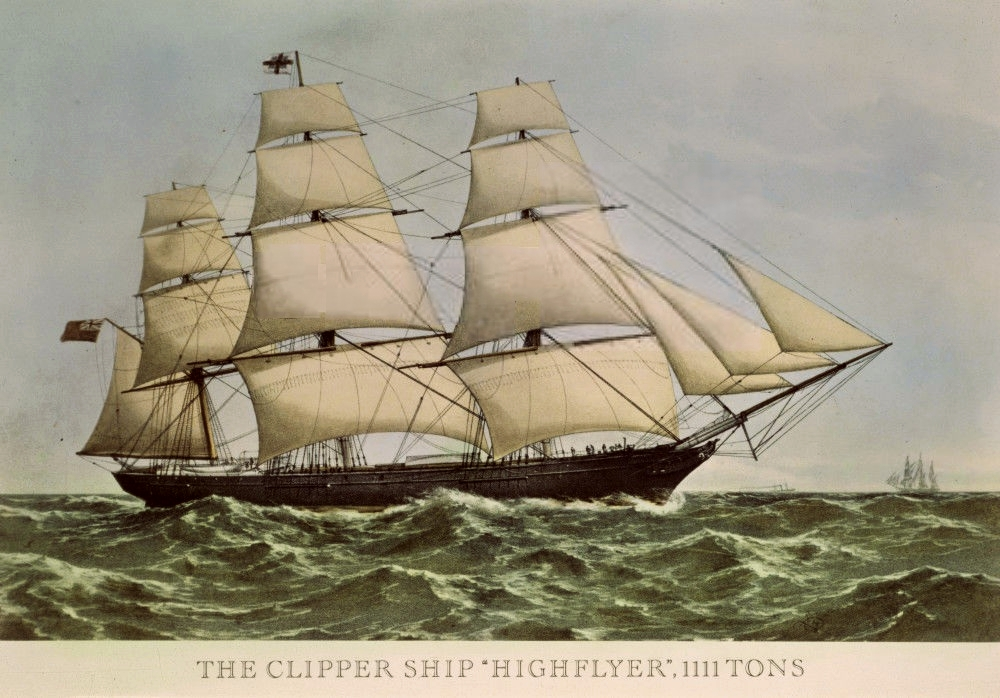
An 1861 lithograph of the Highflyer made just after the ship was launched.

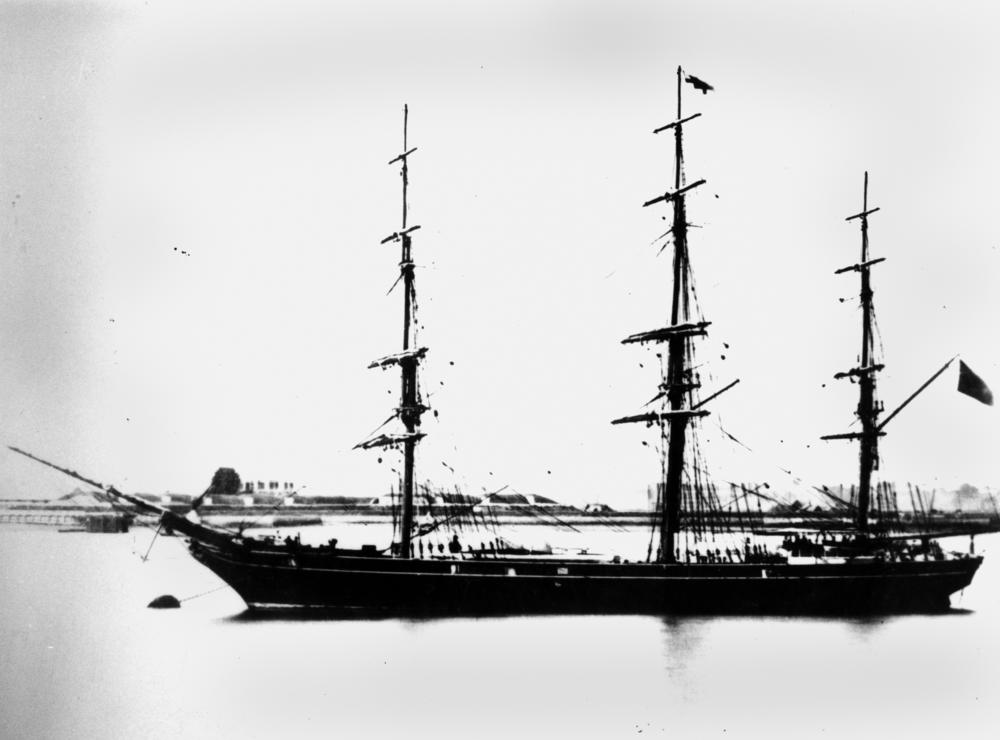
Early photograph of the Highflyer from the State Library of Queensland.

The Highflyer is a British sailing ship, built in 1861 as a Blackwall Frigate, that in 1880 became the first ship to deliver Portuguese immigrants from the Azores Islands to Hawaii. It was preceded by two ships that brought immigrants from the Madeira Islands, making it the third ship to participate in the Portuguese immigration to Hawaii.

== See also ==
- Portuguese immigration to Hawaii
