= SS Priscilla =

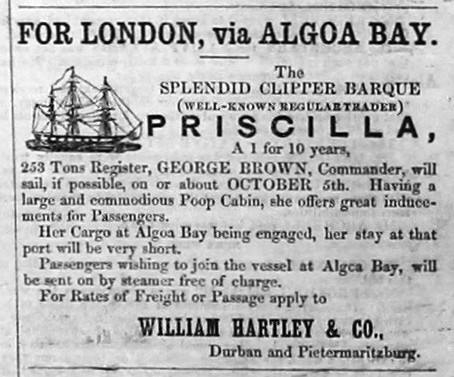
Ad in the 12 April 1861 issue of the Natal Mercury for passage from South Africa to London on the Priscilla.

The Priscilla is a wooden bark that is historically significant for being the first of several ships to bring Portuguese immigrants to the Hawaiian Islands, the Priscilla arriving on 30 September 1878 to Honolulu harbor with 120 settlers recruited from the Madeira Islands of Portugal.

== See also ==
- Portuguese immigration to Hawaii
