= SS Ravenscrag =

Name of several ships

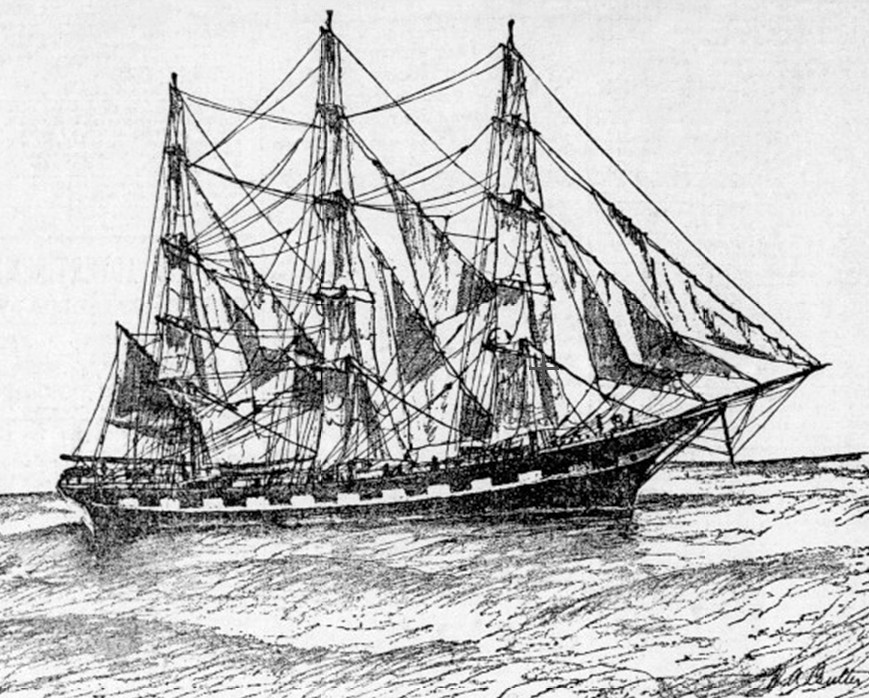
- Sketch of the Ravenscrag from an 1898 newspaper

History

United Kingdom
- Name: SS Ravenscrag
- Namesake: Ravenscraig Castle
- Owner: 1885–96: F. G. Mabane; 1896–01: J. C. Richardson
- Operator: 1866–85: Allan Shipping Line
- Builder: Robert Steele & Co.
- Yard number: 52
- Launched: 1866 in Cartsdyke, Scotland
- In service: 1866–1901
- Fate: Transferred to Norway

History

Norway
- Name: SV Armenia
- Owner: Johanson Joh. & Co.
- In service: 1901–1907
- Fate: Ran aground 27 Aug 1907

General characteristics
- Class & type: Clipper with iron hull
- Tonnage: 1,263 tons
- Length: 219 feet (67 m)
- Sail plan: Barque

Ravenscrag (or Ravenscraig) is the name of several ships, some being sailing vessels and some steamships. One of the sailing vessels is historically significant for bringing to the Hawaiian Islands in 1879 Portuguese immigrants who subsequently introduced the ukulele to island culture.

== Capt. Biggam's Ravenscrag ==
The best known of several similarly named ships, the Ravenscrag (spelled without the "i") is a British sailing vessel commanded by Capt. Biggam that on 23 August 1879 brought 419 Portuguese immigrants from Madeira to the Hawaiian Islands to work as contract laborers in the sugar plantations. The ship left the Madeiran port of Funchal on 23 April 1879 and took exactly four months to cross the Atlantic Ocean, round Cape Horn, and then sail across the Pacific to Honolulu. Among the passengers were Manuel Nunes, Augusto Dias, Jose do Espirito Santo, and Joao Fernandes, who are credited with introducing the ukulele to Hawaii. This was the second ship of Portuguese immigrants to reach the Islands, having been preceded on 30 September 1878 by the German bark SS Priscilla.

Though depicted in a U.S. Postal Service description of a 2004 commemorative stamp release as a wooden-hulled bark, the Ravenscrag was actually a 1,263 tons, 219 feet (67 m) long, iron-hulled, three-masted sailing ship with square sails on each mast (i.e., a clipper). It was commissioned by Scottish-Canadian shipping magnate Sir Hugh Allan for his Allan Shipping Line with freight service between Britain and the States, and named by Allan after his mansion in Montreal, which had been named, in turn, after Ravenscraig Castle in Scotland. The ship was built for Allan in 1866 by Robert Steele & Co. at their Cartsdyke shipyard in Greenock, Scotland (Yard No. 52), and owned by J. & A. Allan & Company of Glasgow, Scotland, an Allan Line subsidiary that was overseen by Sir Hugh's older brother James Allan.

Biggam, still under the employ of the Allan Line, is shown as captain of the Ravenscrag in an 1885 trade journal, the same year the ship was sold to John Crow Richardson of Swansea, Wales. It was then sold in 1896 to F.G. Mabane of South Shields, England. Two years later the New York Times on 7 April 1898 reported that "the British ship Ravenscrag . . . has not arrived here (Callao, Peru) and is officially reported missing." The article further states that the Ravenscrag was "an iron vessel, built at Greenock in 1893, hails from South Shields, Eng. and is owned by T.G. Mabano." Allowing for misspellings and incorrect reporting of dates, this is clearly the same ship that Captain Biggam and 419 Portuguese immigrants sailed 19 years earlier to the Hawaiian Islands. Though feared lost a sea, the Ravenscrag did arrive at the port of Callao several days late, having been delayed by unusually strong currents while crossing the Atlantic.

The Norwegian firm of Johanson Joh. & Co. of Oslo in 1901 purchased the Ravenscrag, and renamed it the SV Armenia. The ship at this time was still full rigged for sail, but the Norwegians subsequently rerigged it as a bark. The SV Armenia met its demise on 27 August 1907 when, while on a voyage from Rio de Janeiro to Glasgow to deliver lumber, it was attempting to put in at the port of Matane, Quebec in a thick fog, and ran aground at Capucins on the Quebec side of the St. Lawrence River.

== Rescue ship of the Polaris expedition ==
Perhaps the first ship to bear the name Ravenscraig (with an "i") was a 581 to 589 tons, 140 feet (43 m) long, wooden sailing ship, sheathed in copper, that was built in 1853 in South Shields, England, and owned by Lockart & Co. Though registered in Kirkcaldy, Scotland, it was employed initially in the Australian and New Zealand wool trade, and was still in service in 1865 when shipping agents Levin & Co. and Bethune & Hunter ran ads advertising passage from New Zealand to London.

The Ravenscraig at some point was outfitted with a steam engine and converted to a whaling ship, which on 23–25 June 1873 was involved in the arctic rescue of the crew of the USS Polaris, which had been trying to reach the North Pole on an ill-fated expedition of the U.S. Navy. The official testimony of one of the rescued sailors describes the Ravenscraig as "a bark of about 400 tons [a rough estimate], with steam-power . . . [that] hailed from Kirkcaldie (Kirkcaldy), but sailed from Dundee." The owner of this bark was Ninian Lockart, Esq. of Kirkcaldy, Scotland, whose firm of Lockart & Co. twenty years earlier in 1853 had first purchased the Ravenscraig.

== Other ships named Ravenscraig ==
Another ship named the SS Ravenscraig was a 243 feet (74 m) long, 2,301 tons steamship built in 1900 at Port Huron, Michigan as a bulk freighter by the Jenks Shipbuilding Company for hauling iron and copper ore on the Great Lakes. It was, in fact, the first ship launched from the company's new ship yard. The SS Ravenscraig was sold in 1907, and taken off the lakes. When it was sold again in 1917 it was renamed the Edward F. Cragin. It remained in service until 1923, when it was scrapped in Italy.

There is also record of a 137 feet (41.8 m) long, 333 tons British steamship named the Ravenscraig that was built in 1899 and sank on 18 September 1932 in the English Channel, just off the mouth of the Thames River, during a collision with another steamship. A more recent ship to bear the name, one that was built about 1979, is a British, 950 feet (290 m) long, steel-hulled, bulk freighter that on 17 April 1989 helped rescue the crew of the cargo ship Star of Alexandria when it sank in the Atlantic Ocean about 400 miles southwest of Cape Cod.
