= 30th (Surrey) Searchlight Regiment, Royal Artillery =

30th (Surrey) Searchlight Regiment 565 (Surrey) Searchlight Regiment
- Active: 1925–1961
- Country: United Kingdom
- Branch: Territorial Army
- Type: Searchlight Regiment
- Role: Air Defence
- Size: Regiment
- Garrison/HQ: Kingston upon Thames
- Motto: Quae sursum sunt quaerite (Seek the things that are above)
- Engagements: The Blitz; Tunisian Campaign; Italian Campaign

30th (Surrey) Searchlight Regiment was an air defence unit of Britain's Territorial Army from 1924 until 1961. During World War II it served in The Blitz and later in the Tunisian and Italian Campaigns, while detachments from the regiment served in the Far East and were captured at the Fall of Singapore.

== Origins ==
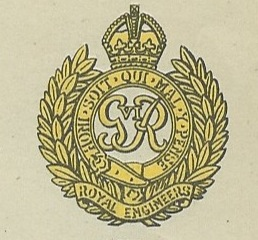
Cap badge of the Royal Engineers (cipher of King George VI).

The regiment had its origins in independent Anti-Aircraft Searchlight Companies of the Royal Engineers formed in the Territorial Army (TA) during 1924. In January 1925, those in Surrey were grouped as follows:

Surrey Group Anti-Aircraft Searchlight Companies

- HQ at London Road, Kingston upon Thames
- 315 (Surrey) AA Company at Mitcham Road Barracks in Croydon
- 316 (Surrey) AA Company at Kingston
- 318 (Surrey) AA Company at Guildford

In December 1924, the Army Council sought permission from HM Treasury to buy and convert a property in Croydon to serve as HQ for 315 Company (225 all ranks) to be raised by the Surrey TA Association. The Army Council considered that 'the provision of accommodation must precede the call for men in order to ensure success', pointing out that 'The new Anti-Aircraft units are of great importance and recruiting, which is slow at present, is likely to be impossible without adequate headquarters to attract the personnel'.

In the event, 315 AASL Company was accommodated at Mitcham Road Barracks in Croydon, originally built in 1794 as a depot for recruits to the Foot Guards, but used by local Territorial units since at least 1859. The site is still an Army Reserve Centre today.

On 15 December 1935, the Surrey Group was redesignated 30th (Surrey) Anti-Aircraft Battalion, Royal Engineers (TA). By then, an additional company (323 (Surrey) AA Company) had been formed at Ewell, later based at Lower Ham Road in Kingston (most of its officers coming from 315 Company. The battalion was subordinated to 27th (Home Counties) Anti-Aircraft Group (later termed a Brigade) based at RAF Kenley in Surrey, forming part of 1st AA Division.

== World War II ==
90 cm 'Projector Anti-Aircraft', displayed at Fort Nelson, Portsmouth.

=== Home Defence ===
By the summer of 1939, 30 Searchlight Bn had been transferred to 47th AA Bde, also based at Kenley. It was part of 5th AA Division, responsible for defending Southern England in Anti-Aircraft Command. 30 Searchlight Bn mobilised on 24 August (10 days before the declaration of war) and moved to its war stations in Hampshire.

In March 1940, the battalion HQ moved to Market Rasen Racecourse in Lincolnshire as part of 39 AA Bde, whose responsibilities included airfields and other vulnerable points in Lincolnshire and along the Humber. The battalion's searchlights were deployed accordingly. Some of these airfields were attacked during June, some searchlight equipment was damaged by bomb splinters, and one site engaged an enemy aircraft with its Lewis gun.

After a short period (29 April–30 June) under command of Lt-Col F.L Congreve of the Royal Artillery (RA), the Commanding Officer from 1 July 1940 was Lt-Col Valentine Christian Green, a former infantry officer and veteran of the Kamerun campaign in World War I, who had recently transferred to the RA. On 1 August 1940, the AA Battalions RE were transferred to the RA, so the battalion became 30th (Surrey) Searchlight Regiment, Royal Artillery and the companies were termed batteries.

=== The Blitz ===
Cap Badge of the Royal Artillery (pre-1953).

In mid-September 1940, S/L layouts had to be thinned out to a 6,000-yard spacing due to equipment shortages. 30 S/L Rgt redeployed with RHQ and one bty at Gainsborough, Lincolnshire, the other btys at Hatfield, South Yorkshire, and Thrybergh. It took over 12 S/L sites from 306 S/L Bty (27th (London Electrical Engineers) S/L Rgt), which returned to London.

As German night air raids on the UK intensified (The Blitz), 30 S/L Rgt sent detachments to London in September and then to Sheffield in November to assist in their defence.

On 12 January 1941, the newly formed 84th S/L Regt came into 39 AA Bde's area on Humberside. The brigadier's operation order commented that 'These Btys have had little training in practical S/L work' and distributed them to double-man S/L sites alongside the experienced 30th S/L Rgt:

- 517/84 Bty alongside 315/30 Bty, with Bty HQ at Militia Camp, Gainsborough
- 518/84 Bty alongside 316/30 Bty, BHQ at Militia Camp, Hatfield Woodhouse
- 519/84 Bty alongside 318/30 Bty, BHQ at Netherfield House, near Worksop
- 512 S/L Bty at The Wheatsheaf, Ely Road, Chatteris, in 40 AA Bde area, was regimented with 84 S/L Rgt from 12 January, but remained in its location for a while before joining 323/30 Bty.

The newly formed 511 Bty of 58th (Middlesex) S/L Rgt, initially attached to 40th (Sherwood Foresters) S/L Rgt, came under command of 30th (Surrey) S/L Rgt from 8 January (when it was considered operationally active) until 12 May 1941, when it was exchanged for 370 Bty of 43rd (5th Duke of Wellington's) S/L Rgt. 370 S/L Battery in turn came under command of 84th S/L Rgt in the summer.

In March 1941, German bombers began dropping mines in the Humber Estuary, and 39 AA Bde ordered 30 Searchlight Regt to establish a mobile detachment to help the defenders engage these raiders. The 'Northern Rovers' and 'Southern Rovers', each of three sections, patrolled the north and south bank of the estuary.

At the end of March, the regiment moved to Bristol for fire-watching and fire-fighting duties, particularly at Bristol and Avonmouth Docks. Bristol was heavily blitzed, especially on 11 April. 315 and 316 Batteries were ordered to prepare for deployment overseas, and they left the regiment on 5 June, 567 Battery (organised on 22 April at Shirehampton Transit Camp, Gloucestershire, from the surplus personnel of 315 and 316) later joined in their place. During the summer of 1941, the regiment's batteries were successively relieved from fire duties at Bristol and went to Birmingham for rest and retraining for a mobile role. In October, the regiment rejoined 39 AA Bde, deployed along the Humber and in the East Riding of Yorkshire.

On 23 January 1942, 511 Battery returned and became part of the regiment. On 1 February, Lt-Col Green was promoted away to command 41 (London) AA Bde. He was replaced by Lt-Col F. Howard Phillips. In the spring of 1942, 318 and 511 batteries were engaged with German raiders over Birmingham, while 323 and 567 were deployed to airfields in East Anglia.

=== Overseas Service ===
The Croydon and Kingston Batteries, 315 and 316, had been sent by sea with 18th Infantry Division bound for the Middle East, but were diverted to Malaya, where they were attached to 5th Searchlight Regiment. As Light Anti-Aircraft/Searchlight units equipped with Bofors guns they were involved in the defence of airfields against Japanese attack before retreating to be captured in the Fall of Singapore. The men remained prisoners of war until 1945, many dying in captivity. A new 315 SL Battery was formed in Ceylon and served there in Air Defence Command 1942–44.

30 Searchlight Regiment left AA Command in August 1942 and joined the War Office Reserve. In September, it was ordered to mobilise for overseas service: 318 and 511 Batteries were detached to remain in the UK as independent batteries, while 400 Battery (from 50 (Northamptonshire Regiment) Searchlight Regiment) and 568 Independent Battery replaced them. On 2 January 1943, the regiment was assigned to First Army, which had landed in Tunisia in Operation Torch. The regiment's order of battle on the eve of departure was as follows:

30th (Surrey) Searchlight Regiment, RA

- 323 (Surrey) Battery
- 400 (Northampton) Battery
- 567 Battery
- 568 Battery
- 30 S/L Rgt Signal Section, Royal Corps of Signals
- 30 S/L Rgt Platoon, Royal Army Service Corps
- 30 S/L Rgt Workshop Section, Royal Electrical and Mechanical Engineers

Regimental headquarters (RHQ) and leading elements of 30 S/L Rgt embarked at Liverpool aboard the troopship HMS Otranto on 7 January 1943 and landed at Algiers on 17 January. Some of the regiment's lorries and searchlight equipment were lost when a following troopship was torpedoed on 7 February. 567 and 323 Batteries remained in the UK as part of GHQ Reserve until February before they sailed.

30 Regiment was the only British searchlight unit serving with Allied Force Headquarters in North Africa. It was split into two parts: RHQ, 567 and 568 Batteries moved to Bone and came under the command of 66 AA Bde, while 323 and 400 Batteries (collectively known as '30/62 Regiment') moved into Tunisia in February with 62 AA Bde, initially running ammunition columns for the rest of the artillery.

Both detachments saw action, replying to direct air attacks on their sites with light machine-guns, 20 mm Hispano cannon on home-made mounts, and 20 mm Oerlikon cannon manned by 218 Battery, RA. Later, 567 and 568 Batteries' sites were each supplied with a Bofors gun manned by 64 Light Anti-Aircraft Regiment for close defence. In April, 567 and 568 Batteries were cooperating with 76 and 79 Heavy Anti-Aircraft Regiment, while from March onwards 30/62 Regt had 131 Z Battery under command.

By the final phase of Operation Torch, HQ and one Bty of 30 S/L were at Tunis and Bizerta, under 52nd AA Bde, which held a number of AA units on their wheels and ready to move into the objectives of Tunis and Bizerta immediately behind the leading battle groups. They deployed in Tunis on 7 May before the last German combat groups had been cleared out.

During the Italian Campaign, 30 Regiment was once again the only British searchlight unit operating under AFHQ, but on 7 December 1943 it was placed in suspended animation and its personnel dispersed to other units. 567 and 568 Batteries continued as independent units in 1944, serving with British Land Forces Adriatic; they were disbanded on 15 February 1946 and 7 November 1945 respectively. and 89th HAA Rgt/AA Defence Command Brindisi respectively

== Postwar ==
When the TA was reconstituted on 1 January 1947, the regiment reformed as 565 Searchlight Regiment, RA (Surrey), with its HQ once more at Kingston. It formed part of 106 AA Bde, also based at Kingston. On 16 March 1949, the regiment's role was partly changed and it was redesignated 565 (Mixed) Light Anti-Aircraft/Searchlight Regiment (Surrey), 'Mixed' indicating that some of the personnel were from the Women's Royal Army Corps.

When AA Command was disbanded on 10 March 1955, 565 LAA regiment absorbed two other Surrey AA units: 566 Light Anti-Aircraft Regiment (City of London Rifles), based at Sutton, and 598 LAA Regiment (4th Bn, The Queen's Regiment), at Croydon, the original 565 personnel becoming R Battery in the merged regiment:

- P (City of London Rifles) Bty
- Q (4th Queen's) Bty
- R (Surrey) Bty
- S (City of London Rifles) Bty

In 1961, a further reorganisation saw 565 Regiment converted to infantry and merged with 6th Battalion The Queen's Royal Regiment (West Surrey) to form 3rd (V) Battalion The Queen's Royal Surrey Regiment, when the RE and RA lineage ended.

== First-hand account ==
To hear an Imperial War Museum interview with Sergeant Percy Mutimer on his experiences with 316 Searchlight Battery in peacetime Kingston, in the Malayan campaign, and as a Japanese POW, visit http://www.iwm.org.uk/collections/item/object/80004760.

== Honorary Colonel ==
Richard Onslow, 5th Earl of Onslow (1876–1945) was appointed Honorary Colonel of the Surrey Group of AA Companies in 1927 and continued in the role for 30th (Surrey).

== External sources ==
- British Army units from 1945 on
- British Army website
- British Military History
- Croydon Council website
- The Drill Hall Project.
- Imperial War Museum
- Orders of Battle at Patriot Files
- Land Forces of Britain, the Empire and Commonwealth (Regiments.org)
- The Royal Artillery 1939–45
- Graham Watson, The Territorial Army 1947
