= 5th Searchlight Regiment, Royal Artillery =

5th Searchlight Regiment, RA
- Royal Artillery cap badge
- Active: 13 May 1941–15 February 1942
- Country: United Kingdom
- Branch: British Army
- Type: Searchlight Regiment
- Role: Air Defence
- Size: 5 Batteries
- Part of: Malaya Command
- Engagements: Battle of Singapore

The 5th Searchlight Regiment, Royal Artillery (5th S/L Rgt) was a short-lived air defence unit of the British Army during World War II. Formed to defend Singapore in 1941, the regiment was captured less than a year later when the fortress surrendered to the Japanese.

== Origin ==
Until 1938 all Anti-Aircraft Searchlight (AAS/L) duties in the British Army were carried out by the Royal Engineers (RE). In October 1936 the RE reformed 30th and 34th Fortress Companies (which had been disbanded in the UK in 1933 and 1927 respectively) to man AAS/Ls at Singapore, where defences were being built for the naval base. From 1938 AAS/L units were progressively transferred from the RE to the Royal Artillery (RA), including the S/L elements of the two fortress companies at Singapore, which became 13 and 14 Searchlight (S/L) Batteries in 1940. The RA then formed a regimental headquarters (RHQ), 5th Searchlight Regiment, on 13 May 1941 to command these two companies. Its primary role was to support the Bristol Blenheim Night fighters of the Royal Air Force (RAF) at Singapore, which were old and in poor condition. There were also three AA gun regiments, but little radar.

90 cm 'Projector Anti-Aircraft', displayed at Fort Nelson, Hampshire.

In view of the worsening relations with Japan the British sent a few reinforcements to Singapore, including 315 and 316 (Surrey) S/L Btys. These two batteries had been formed after World War I as RE AAS/L Companies in the Territorial Army (TA), later coming under 30th (Surrey) AA Battalion. This had been mobilised on the outbreak of war with Germany in 1939 and transferred to the RA on 1 August 1940 as 30th (Surrey) S/L Rgt. In April 1941 the two batteries were detached from their regiment and became part of the War Office Reserve for deployment overseas. In August they embarked for Singapore, arriving on 6 November.

On the eve of the Japanese invasion, 5th S/L Rgt in Singapore commanded by Lieutenant-Colonel R.A.O. Clarke had the following organisation:

- 13, 14 S/L Btys (Regular)
- 315, 316 (Surrey) S/L Btys (TA)
- S/L Bty manned by the Straits Settlements Volunteer Force

== Japanese invasion of Malaya ==
With increasing evidence that the Japanese were massing forces to strike at British Malaya, the Singapore garrison was brought to the second degree of readiness on 1 December 1941. The Japanese invasion of Malaya began with seaborne landings just after midnight on the night of 7/8 December (before the Attack on Pearl Harbor). The first air raid on Singapore came in at 03.30 that same night, though the night fighters were not scrambled because the defences had not practised sufficiently to coordinate them with the AA guns and S/Ls. The AA guns failed to destroy any enemy aircraft.

Over the next few weeks, while the Japanese advance down the Malay peninsula made rapid progress, there were further air raids on Singapore, the tempo increasing in January 1942. Meanwhile, new gun and machine gun emplacements were hurriedly dug across the north of Singapore Island, facing the Strait of Johore, before the Japanese appeared on the opposite shore. This construction was hampered by the frequent air raids. The AA guns, which had been reinforced, were positioned to protect the airfields, the harbour and naval base, and the city.

== Defence of Singapore ==
The defences of the island were arranged in three areas. The invasion was expected to come in Western Area, where 5th S/L Rgt manned S/Ls at all three sectors to illuminate those beaches where it was thought that landings might be attempted; these S/Ls were supplemented by headlights taken from cars.

At dawn on 8 February, air attacks against Singapore increased in intensity, and bombing and shelling went on all day. At 01.30 on 9 February the Japanese bombardment shifted to the beaches to cover their landings. However, the S/L positions could not receive orders to expose their lights because all the communication links had been shattered by the bombardment. Having made their landings the Japanese pushed the Australian brigade in the sector back from the beaches to its inner defences (the 'Jurong Line'). At the end of the day the last RAF fighters were withdrawn to Sumatra. On 10 February the Jurong Line was abandoned amidst much confusion and the Japanese pressed on to the defences round the city itself.

As the defences crumbled and ammunition ran short, the AA troops on the island were pressed into service as infantry. Finally, with water and supplies running out, the whole force on Singapore surrendered on 15 February.

== Aftermath ==
The prisoners (at least those of 315 and 316 S/L Btys) were imprisoned in Changi Prison until April 1942. They were then sent on a horrific voyage to French Indochina and put to work in the docks at Saigon. The men remained prisoners of war until the Surrender of Japan in 1945, many dying in captivity.

Formally, 5th Searchlight Regiment was considered to have passed into suspended animation on 15 February 1942, but it was never reformed. A new 315 S/L Battery was formed in Ceylon and served there in Air Defence Command 1942–44.
