= 4th Battalion, Queen's Royal Regiment (West Surrey) =

2nd Surrey Rifle Volunteer Corps 4th Battalion, Queen's Regiment 63rd (Queen's) Searchlight Regiment 127th (Queen's) Light Anti-Aircraft Regiment 598 (4th Bn Queen's) Light Anti-Aircraft Regiment
- Active: 16 June 1859–1 May 1961
- Country: United Kingdom
- Branch: Territorial Army
- Role: Infantry; Air Defence
- Garrison/HQ: Croydon
- Engagements: Second Boer War; First World War: Gallipoli Campaign; Sinai and Palestine Campaign; Western Front; Third Anglo-Afghan War; Second World War: Battle of Britain; The Blitz; North West Europe

The 4th Battalion, Queen's Royal Regiment (West Surrey) (4th Queen's) was a volunteer unit of the British Army from 1859 to 1961. Beginning from small independent units recruited in the South London suburbs, it was attached to the Queen's Royal Regiment (West Surrey) and served in the Second Boer War, the First World War, and the Third Anglo-Afghan War. Before the Second World War, it was converted into a Royal Artillery searchlight regiment that served in the Battle of Britain and The Blitz. Later it became a light anti-aircraft gun unit serving on blockships in the Mulberry harbour during the Normandy invasion, and then defended the port of Antwerp in the closing stages of the war. Postwar it continued in the air defence role before rejoining the Queen's Regiment as infantry.

== Origins ==
An invasion scare in 1859 led to the emergence of the Volunteer Movement, and Rifle Volunteer Corps (RVCs) began to be organised throughout Great Britain. The 2nd Surrey RVC was formed at Croydon (then in Surrey) on 16 June 1859 under the command of James Hunter Campbell, formerly of the Bengal Artillery. The headquarters (HQ) was in the Old Barracks, Mitcham Road, Croydon. A second company was added in March 1860. The unit was included in the 1st Administrative Battalion of Surrey RVCs (later 5th Battalion East Surrey Regiment) from 8 September 1860, but by March 1867 it had recruited sufficient additional personnel from the Crystal Palace, Norwood and Caterham areas to reach a strength of six companies and become an independent battalion in its own right. An affiliated Cadet Corps was formed at Whitgift School in 1874.

Under the scheme of 'localisation' introduced by the Cardwell Reforms in 1873, the Surrey RVCs, together with the Surrey Militia were grouped into two 'sub-districts' alongside the Regular regiments in the county. The 2nd Surrey RVC was assigned to Sub-District No. 48 with the 2nd Foot (The Queen's Royal Regiment). While the sub-districts were referred to as 'brigades', they were purely administrative organisations and the Volunteers were excluded from the 'mobilisation' part of the Cardwell system, though they carried out joint manoeuvres, and the Surrey RVCs were assigned a role in the garrison of Sheerness Dockyard.

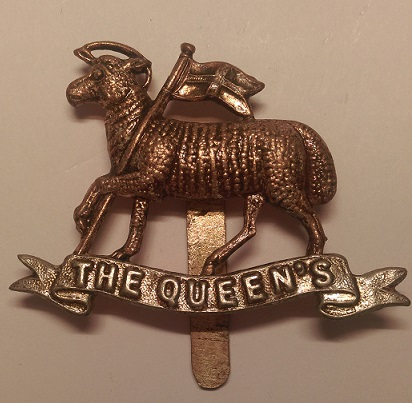
Cap badge of the Queen's

Under the Childers Reforms, the unit became a Volunteer Battalion (VB) of the Queen's Royal Regiment (West Surrey) ('The Queen's') on 1 July 1881 and was redesignated as the regiment's 1st VB on 1 March 1883.

The Stanhope Memorandum of December 1888 proposed a more comprehensive mobilisation scheme for Volunteer units, which would assemble in their own brigades at key points in time of war. In peacetime these brigades provided a structure for collective training. Under this scheme the Volunteer Battalions of the Surrey regiments formed the Surrey Brigade, the assembly point for which was at Caterham Barracks, the Brigade of Guards' depot conveniently situated for the London Defence Positions along the North Downs. The battalion added a company at Caterham, and later formed detachments nearby at Merstham and Oxted.

== 2nd Boer War ==
Members of the 1st VB served in the Volunteer Company sent to augment the Regulars of the Queen's in South Africa during the Second Boer War. This was the first time the Volunteers had fought alongside the Regulars, gaining the battalion its first Battle honour: South Africa 1900–1902. The company was commanded by Captain De La Mare of 1st VB and joined the 2nd Battalion on 12 April 1900. During May and June the battalion fought in the Biggarsberg and Drakensberg mountains, including a brisk action to capture Alleman's Nek.

By 1900 the 1st VB had 10 companies, reducing to nine in 1903 (seven at Croydon and one each at Crystal Palace and Caterham). In the reorganisation after the end of the war in 1902, separate East and West Surrey Brigades were formed, under command of the respective regimental districts.

== Territorial Force ==
When the Volunteers were subsumed into the new Territorial Force (TF) under the Haldane Reforms of 1908, the battalion became the 4th Battalion, Queen's Royal Regiment (West Surrey), forming part of the Surrey Brigade in the Home Counties Division.

== World War I ==
=== Mobilisation ===
On the outbreak of World War I, TF units were invited to volunteer for Overseas Service. On 15 August 1914, the War Office issued instructions to separate those men who had signed up for Home Service only, and form these into reserve units. On 31 August, the formation of a reserve or 2nd Line unit was authorised for each 1st Line unit where 60 per cent or more of the men had volunteered for Overseas Service. The titles of these 2nd Line units would be the same as the original, but distinguished by a '2/' prefix. In this way duplicate battalions, brigades and divisions were created, mirroring those TF formations being sent overseas.

On mobilisation, the majority of the men of the Home Counties Division accepted liability for overseas service and it was sent to India to relieve Regular troops. The Home Service-only men, together with the recruits who were flooding in, remained at the depots to form 2nd-Line battalions. Thus when the 1/4th Queen's sailed for India on 30 October, the 2/4th Bn was forming at Croydon. Subsequently, 3/4th and 4/4th Battalions were formed in June and July 1915.

=== 1/4th Battalion ===
==== India ====
The Home Counties Division disembarked at Bombay 1–3 December 1914. It was then split up and the battalions were distributed to stations all over India. The 1/4th Queen's went to Secunderabad and replaced a Regular battalion in 9th (Secunderabad) Division, then in January 1915 it moved to Lucknow and transferred to the 8th (Lucknow) Division, moving to Allahabad under that division in April. Like all the Home Counties Division units it sent drafts of officers and men to reinforce other fronts, and during 1915 it sent its first draft to Mesopotamia (50 men to 2nd Norfolk Regiment). 'A' Company was detached to Fyzabad in October. In January 1916 2/4th Queen's transferred again to Peshawar, in the 1st (Peshawar) Division on the North West Frontier. Here it was ordered to mobilise for service in Mesopotamia and drew field service equipment. However, it had been reduced by the drafts it had sent out to just 600 men, and its mobilisation was cancelled in February. Instead it moved to Nowshera, Srinagar, , joining 2nd (Nowshera) Brigade of the Peshawar Division. During the summer the battalion received two drafts of reinforcements totalling over 300 men. It was therefore at a good strength when the Peshawar Division was mobilised on 25 October 1916 in response to trouble in the Mohmand country along the frontier. From 26 to 30 October the brigade acted as the covering force for 1st (Peshawar) Brigade along the line of border blockhouses. It was then sent to Peshawar while a flying column dealt with trouble in the Khyber Pass. Next it moved to camp at Adezai, helping civil authorities to arrest offenders in the neighbouring villages. Then on 14 November a Mohmand force estimated at 6000 strong threatened Shabqadar. Next day the Peshawar Division attacked with support from aircraft and armoured cars, and completely broke up the concentration. On 18 November 1/4th Queen's and a battalion of Indian troops attacked and destroyed the rebel village of Dewarzagai. It then spent two months manning and improving the Mohmand Blockade Line, carrying out occasional sweeps (which was enough to gain the battalion the battle honour North West Frontier 1916–1917).

In February 1917 the 1/4th Queen's returned to Peshawar for training, and in March it received another reinforcement draft. On 19 March 1917 it moved to 3rd (Lahore) Divisional Area, which became 16th Indian Division in May that year. The battalion remained with 43rd Indian Brigade of that formation until the end of the war. On 12 May the brigade was ordered to mobilise for service with the Waziristan Field Force. 1/4th Queen's left Lahore 750 strong and arrived at Tank on 17 May. However, as the battalion prepared for field service the sickness rate increased alarmingly from malaria, sandfly fever and heatstroke: by the time it was due to march on 6 June it was unfit for service and was replaced by another battalion. On 12 June it was sent to the hill stations of Simla to recover, but only 350 men were fit to march, and more dropped out along the way, only 200 men reaching their new station. A base station was left at Tank, and 79 drafts arrived, but it was not until the end of the year that the battalion regained a normal standard of health. In Spring 1918 the battalion returned to Lahore, with detachments at Dalhousie and Amritsar, but it suffered further casualties, including 20 deaths, from the Spanish flu epidemic.

==== 3rd Afghan War ====
Demobilisation began in January 1919 following the Armistice with Germany, but after a few men had left the battalion mobilised a flying column in response to disturbances in the Punjab in April 1919. The column was sent to Jullundur where it provided escorts and guards, and support to the civil authorities. Early in May 1919 the whole battalion was mobilised for field service in the Third Anglo-Afghan War. On 12 May it returned to Peshawar, when the city was surrounded by a cordon of British and Indian troops to prevent a pro-Afghan rising. It spent the rest of the month providing picquets and escorts, with Battalion HQ, A & C Companies in Chitral Barracks, and B & D Companies in Peshawar City. It was relieved on 28 May and moved up to Nowshera, with a company detached to guard the Royal Air Force airfield at Risalpur. It took over control of the Landi Kotal and Jamrud sectors. A preliminary peace was signed on 8 August, and on 5 September the battalion moved back to Peshawar. The battalion received the Afghanistan 1919 battle honour.

Demobilisation now resumed, and the battalion was placed under orders for home. Leaving in India with the 2nd Bn those details who were not eligible for demobilisation, it left Peshawar on 3 October and went by train to Bombay. On 18 October it embarked on the SS Königin Luise, which dropped anchor in Plymouth Sound on 12 November. The battalion was accommodated in huts at Crowborough Beacon in Sussex while groups were sent to demobilisation centres and a party attended a civic reception at Croydon. By 18 November only a cadre of 1/4th Queen's remained, and this later returned to Croydon where it was disembodied on 20 December 1919. During its service (including those serving in Mesopotamia) the battalion had lost 3 officers and 4 other ranks (ORs) killed or died of wounds, and 61 ORs died of disease.

==== Commanding officers ====
The following officers commanded 1/4th Queen's:

- Lt-Col Norman Cutler from mobilisation; invalided home from India 1 January 1915; returned 1 January 1916; to command convalescent depot 30 January 1918
- Lt-Col Snelling Roper, promoted 1 January 1915 – 1 January 1916; later to Egypt
- Lt-Col Harold Atkins, promoted 30 January 1918, to demobilisation

=== 2/4th Battalion ===
The 2/4th Queen's began forming in August 1914 and was officially recognised on 1 September. Lieutenant-Col Frank Watney, who had commanded 4th Queen's from 1903 to 1909, returned to take command of 2/4th Bn. The battalion began its training at Croydon, but in mid-November it moved to Windsor, where it joined 200th (2/1st Surrey) Brigade in 67th (2nd Home Counties) Division. On 24 April 1915 it was brought up to a full strength composite battalion with men from 2/5th Queen's (as the 'Queen's Composite Battalion' under Lt-Col Watney) and was transferred to 160th (Welsh Border) Brigade in 53rd (Welsh) Division at Cambridge. In May the division moved to Bedford to continue its training, and on 2 July was ordered to refit for service in the Mediterranean. The battalion (which had reverted to the title of 2/4th Queen's on 15 June) entrained for Devonport Dockyard on 17 July and embarked on the Ulysses the same night. It disembarked in Alexandria on 28 July and moved to Port Said. The battalion, 900 strong, left 150 men at Port Said as its first reinforcements, and then the Ulysses sailed on.

==== Gallipoli ====
53rd (W) Division was destined as reinforcements for the Gallipoli Campaign. After sailing for Lemnos it landed on C Beach at Suvla Bay on the night of 8/9 August. The 2/4th Queen's went straight into action to assist 31st Brigade of 10th (Irish) Division on the north-west slope of Chocolate Hill. Having taken a few casualties crossing the open ground to the south of Salt Lake, the battalion arrived at 07.40. The Commanding Officer (CO), Lt-Col Watney, was then ordered round to the northern side to dig in and support 33rd Brigade of 11th (Northern) Division, which was hard-pressed on Scimitar Hill. Lacking maps, Watney was pointed in the direction of Scimitar Hill and simply told not to 'go off into the blue'. The battalion moved off round the northern spur of the hill and the east to join up with 6th Bn Royal Dublin Fusiliers. It reached the top of Scimitar Hill, but was driven off by shellfire, some of it from British artillery firing short. The battalion regained the crest and held it until driven off by the scrubland catching fire. It then concentrated in old Turkish trenches and consolidated a line facing Scimitar Hill. In its first action the 990-strong battalion had suffered casualties amounting to 8 officers and 250 other ranks killed, wounded and missing.

2/4th Queen's was relieved on the night of 12 August and rejoined the rest of its brigade at the beach. On 18 August two companies went forward to the front line to support with rifle fire an attack by 29th Division (the Battle of Scimitar Hill), the two other companies being employed on trench construction. From then on the battalion endured spells in the front line alternating with digging positions in the rear. Lieutenant-Col Watney was in temporary command of the brigade for three weeks after the Brigadier-General was wounded on 2 September. The battalion drove off a small attack on its position on 18 September. By the end of September it was reduced by battle casualties and sickness to 335 men, about half of its pre-landing strength, and 100 of those were on light duties because of illness. Both the CO and the second-in-command were invalided. On 21 October it was so weakened that it formed a composite battalion with 1/4th Bn Royal Sussex Regiment. Severe weather brought further casualties in November, despite the arrival of a draft of 100 men from home. The battalion was evacuated to Mudros aboard the El Kahirah on 13 December, with a strength of 14 officers and 224 other ranks (ORs), having suffered losses of 29 officers and 680 ORs killed, wounded, missing, or sick.

==== Palestine ====
From Mudros 53rd (W) Division was shipped to Alexandria, and began a long period of rest and recuperation guarding the Nile Valley in Egypt. After being reinforced to about 500 strong, the 2/4th Queen's took up positions about 13 miles (21 km) out in the desert covering Ferry Post on the Suez Canal. When the Turks attacked the canal defences in August 1916, leading to the Battle of Romani, only part of 53rd Division was actually engaged. 2/4th Queen's was moved to Kantara on 5 August and next day to Hill 60, some 6 miles (9.7 km) from Romani, but did not come into action. Nevertheless the battalion was later awarded the battle honours Rumani and Egypt 1915–1916.

After the Turkish defeat at Rumani, the Egyptian Expeditionary Force (EEF) followed up across the Sinai desert. 160th Brigade marched out on 22 November and by 9 January 1917 all the Turkish outposts had been evacuated and the advancing EEF had built railways, roads and water pipelines behind it as far as the frontier. The British opened the Sinai and Palestine Campaign in March 1917 when the EEF advanced towards Gaza, with 53rd (W) Division in the Desert Column. 2/4th Queen's crossed the frontier on 21 March as 53rd (W) Division followed the mounted troops towards Gaza City. The 1st Battle of Gaza began at 03.30 on 26 March, when 160th Bde started to cross Wadi Ghuzzee. Shortly afterwards, fog began to roll in from the sea, slowing the advance, but the attack began shortly after 11.45. 2/4th Queen's was in brigade reserve, but sent up one company during the afternoon. By 13.30 the brigade had captured 'The Labyrinth', a maze of entrenched gardens, and by 18.30 the whole position had been secured. But events had not gone so well elsewhere, and 53rd (W) Division was ordered to pull back. 2/4th Queen's was one of the last units to pull back, but by the morning of 28 March it was back on its starting position behind Wadi Ghuzzee. Its losses amounted to 106 all ranks.

From 11 to 16 April the battalion was engaged in digging a line of trenches along the edge of Wadi Ghuzzee under shellfire. A second attempt to take Gaza began on 17 April, and 53rd (W) Division attacked in the second phase on 19 April. The objective for 160th Brigade was Samson Ridge, which was eventually taken at the point of the bayonet. 2/4th Queen's had been acting as a link between 53rd (W) and 52nd (Lowland) Divisions and at the end of the day it was on Heart Hill. Its casualties were comparatively light, with 1 officer and 38 ORs wounded. However, the attack elsewhere failed, and the troops dug in where they stood.

There followed a pause of several months while the EEF was reorganised. The 3rd Battle of Gaza involved outflanking the Gaza–Beersheba line, after which 53rd (W) Division was sent on 3 November to take the heights of Tell Khuweilfe. 2/4th Queen's and 2/4th Royal West Kents each sent battalion HQ and one company to reconnoitre the position, crossing several successive ridges under fire. Lieutenant-Col Wilkins was wounded during this reconnaissance. 160th Brigade found the enemy in strength, and holding the water supplies. The attack was renewed unsuccessfully the following day. The division kept up the pressure on 6 November, and eventually the Turks were forced to evacuate the position after being outflanked elsewhere.

By early December the EEF was working round Jerusalem. 2/4th Queen's, ordered to capture the hills at Beit Jala on 8 December, advanced under accurate shellfire, but found the position unoccupied. The city fell the following day.

On 21 December, 160th Brigade carried out a minor operation near Jericho. At 05.00 three companies of 2/4th Queens captured a Turkish post, and the Turks fell back to 'White Hill'. A company of 2/4th Queen's, together with one of 2/10th Middlesex Regiment, took this position after fierce close fighting with bombs, bayonets, and clubbed rifles. On 27 December the Turks made a strong counter-attack towards Jerusalem; 2/4th Queen's suffered heavy casualties, but although it withdrew from White Hill its machine guns prevented the Turks from holding it in force, and it was reoccupied during the night.

During the subsequent operations in the Judean Hills, 53rd (W) Division was ordered to capture Tell 'Asur on 8 March 1918. This led to further heavy fighting, with 160th Brigade forcing its way steadily forward over broken ground on 11 March to reach the hills beyond. 53rd (W) Division was not engaged for the next two months.

==== French command ====
However, the success of the German spring offensive on the Western Front demanded urgent reinforcements from Palestine for the British Expeditionary Force (BEF). 2/4th Queen's left 53rd Division on 31 May 1918, sailed from Alexandria on 15 June and after landing at Taranto it proceeded by rail to Proven in Flanders, arriving on 30 June and joining 101st Brigade in 34th Division.

34th Division had been virtually destroyed in the Spring battles, and was being reconstituted with battalions from Palestine and India. As soon as this was complete it was to be sent to reinforce the French sector of the front. When the Germans launched the last effort of their Spring Offensive on 15 July (the Second Battle of the Marne), the division was diverted and by the evening of 18 July was concentrated round Senlis. The infantry were then moved up by lorry and by 03.00 on 23 July had completed the relief of a French division in the front line.

The 34th Division immediately joined in the French counter-attack (the Battle of the Soissonnais and the Ourcq) on 23 July. However, due to communication problems, 101st Brigade was late setting off (08.00) and lost its creeping barrage. The leading battalion was stopped in its tracks, and 2/4th Queen's trying to come up alongside was forced back. The brigade was back on its start-line, having suffered heavy casualties, by 09.30.

After a day in the rear line, 34th Division shifted position on 29 July to attack again and capture Beugneux Ridge. 2/4th Queen's attacked on a two-company front in the first line of 101st Brigade. Starting at 04.10 the battalion pushed forward through a German defensive barrage that included Tear gas, and had progressed over a mile by 06.00, when a halt was made. But when the follow-up battalions passed through to continue the attack, the morning fog had lifted and they were stopped. The attack was renewed on 1 August, 2/4th Queen's once again in the lead, though now weak in numbers and obliged to put in three companies to complete the first line. Nevertheless, the attack launched in fog and smoke at 04.49 had achieved its objectives by 06.00. After the battle, the division entrained to return to the British front.

==== Hundred Days Offensive ====
After two weeks' rest, 34th Division went into the line under Second Army in the Scherpenberg sector of the Ypres Salient on 30 August. Early next morning a patrol from 2/4th Queen's established that the enemy was withdrawing from Kemmel Hill, and this was quickly occupied and a new line established. On the morning of 1 September the whole line advanced, though 2/4th Queen's reported 'a little trouble with some Huns in the Yonge Street dugouts'. In the afternoon two companies of 2/4th Queen's pushed on to 'Beaver Huts', while the other two were established in the 'Vierstraat Switch' trench behind. There were patrol clashes during the night and enemy shelling the following morning. At 15.00 103rd Brigade attempted to advance behind a barrage, with flank support from 2/4th Queen's, but the attack was halted by the enemy barrage and enfilade fire. The pursuit of the enemy from Kemmel Hill ended on 4 September and 101st Bde spent the following weeks holding the line.

The Allies launched a series of offensives all along the Western Front from 27 September. Second Army joined in with the Fifth Battle of Ypres on 28 September. 34th Division attacked on the first day, pushing forward strong patrols protected by smoke barrages. In the evening, 101st Brigade pushed up the Wytschaete Ridge to within 10 yards of German positions. Next morning 101st Brigade advanced at 05.30, encountering little opposition, swept through Wytschaete, reached Oosttaverne by 08.40, and was at the Ypres–Comines Canal by 13.00.

The division was then in reserve until the Battle of Courtraibegan on 14 October. 101st Brigade entered the line alongside the rest of the division on the night of 15/16 October. It cleared Wevelghem, but was unable to cross the River Lys until after dark, when it used small rafts. There was no sign of the enemy in front, and progress was easy on 18 and 19 October, 2/4th Queen's forming the divisional advance guard on the latter day. It encountered a temporary check in front of Belleghem, but another battalion outflanked the village and a company of 2/4th Queen's then passed through the village before midnight. 101st Brigade was relieved on 20 October. It came back into the line, acting as an independent brigade group, on the night of 26/27 October. When 103rd Bde Group relieved 101st Bde two nights later, 2/4th Queen's remained attached to 103rd for the 'Action at Tiegham' on 31 October. The battalion's role was to act as a flank guard, with a half company forming a liaison group with a half-company from the French division on the left. Supported by tanks and covered by thick fog, 103rd Bde took its first objective with ease, but the French and the liaison company were held up, and 2/4th Queen's had to cover an open flank all day while 103rd Bde pushed on to the second objective at Anseghem.

The division was withdrawn into reserve on 1 November, and was still refitting and training when the Armistice with Germany came into force on 11 November.

==== Post-Armistice ====
On 14 November 34th Division moved up to Lessines, where it went into billets and undertook light training. On 17 November it was announced that the division would form part of the British force in the Allied occupation of the Rhineland, but it did not move immediately. From 12 December it went into winter quarters at Namur and on 22 December demobilisation began for men from critical trades. On 17 January the division entrained for the Rhine, and took over part of the Cologne bridgehead.

When the occupation force was converted into the British Army of the Rhine in March 1919, 2/4th Queen's together with 10th and 11th (Service) Bns, Queen's, formed 123rd Brigade of the London Division. The much-depleted 2/4th Battalion absorbed the 1000-strong 53rd (Service) Battalion of the Queen's (see below) in April 1919. In October the 2/4th Bn was reduced to a cadre, large drafts being transferred o the 10th and 11th Queens, and the cadre was disbanded on 31 October. During its service the battalion had lost 20 officers and 244 other ranks (ORs) killed, missing, died of wounds or disease, and 37 officers and 681 ORs were wounded.

==== Commanding officers ====
The following officers commanded 2/4th Queen's:

- Lt-Col Frank Watney, 1 September 1914, Acting Brig–Gen 20 September–28 December 1915, invalided 4 February 1916; returned 1 March 1916, to 3 July 1916
- Capt Leonard Hull, acting 26 September–3 October 1915
- Capt James McNaught, acting 4–20 October 1915
- Maj Sydney Beale, acting 20 October–27 December 1915
- Maj Robert Few, acting 5–28 February 1916; as Lt-Col 4 July–20 August 1916, 3 December 1916–22 January 1917, 29 April–9 May 1917
- Lt-Col Hugh Watson, 21 August–2 December 1916
- Lt-Col Henry Wilkins, 23 January–28 April 1917, returned 10 May, wounded 3 November 1917
- Lt-Col Snelling Roper (see 1/4th Bn), 3 November 1917 – 13 May 1918
- Maj Harold Stanley-Murray, acting 14–18 May 1918
- Maj Percy Jude, acting 19–24 May 1918
- Lt-Col William Hill, 25 May 1918 to demobilisation

=== 3/4th Battalion ===
The residue of the 2/4th Battalion continued in 200th (2/1st Surrey) Bde in 67th (2nd Home Counties) Division at Windsor until it was redesignated 3/4th Bn on 24 April 1915 under Lt-Col Utten Hooke, who had previously been second-in-command of 4th Queen's. Training for 67th (HC) Division was hampered by the lack of modern arms and equipment: at first there were only .256-in Japanese Ariska rifles, until these were replaced with obsolete Mk I Lee-Enfield rifles in November 1915. In June the brigade took up its place in home defence as part of Second Army, Central Force, in Kent with 3/4th Queen's at Tunbridge Wells. While at Tunbridge Wells the men who had not signed up for overseas service were transferred to 69th Provisional Battalion (see below). Most of the battalion was stationed at Halling to wok on the London defences, then from October 1915 the battalion was stationed at Reigate in Surrey. In July 1916 it moved to Sturry, with 200th Bde around Westbere and Gore Street. Here training was carried out with US-made Enfield Mark W rifles. Twice the division was ordered to prepare for service in Ireland and in April 1917 to prepare to join the BEF in France. However, none of these moves came off, and in the end 3/4th Queen's left the division and went to France independently.

==== Western Front ====
The battalion embarked on the transport La Marguerite at Southampton Docks and disembarked at Le Havre on 1 June 1917. It was first attached to the 1st South African Brigade in 9th (Scottish) Division then after 10 days moved to 4th Division at St Nicolas on the River Scarpe near Arras, where companies were attached to experienced battalions for instruction in front line duties. Lieutenant-Col Utten was killed by a shellburst near the chemical factory while going up to the line on 21 June. The battalion was then quartered in the oil factory at Arras while working on the front line in the Monchy-le-Preux sector. Here was attached to 12th (Eastern) Division, finally joining 62nd Brigade in 21st Division on 9 August.

21st Division was in the sector opposite Fontaine-lès-Croisilles, where 3/4th Queen's took spells of duty in the lines (mainly captured trenches of the Hindenburg Line) and learned patrolling in the broad No man's land in front. After two weeks of training, 21st Division moved to Second Army in the Ypres Salient on 16 September, to join in the Ypres Offensive. 21st Division was engaged in the Battle of Polygon Wood on 29 September, but the inexperienced 3/4th Queen's did not make its first attack until the Battle of Broodseinde. 62nd Brigade took over the line on the night of 2/3 October after a difficult approach march under heavy shelling, with the column silhouetted by burning ammunition dumps. The battalion was to lead 62nd Bde's attack. After limited reconnaissance because of heavy fire, the battalion went into its assembly trenches at 03.00 on 4 October, on a frontage of three companies with C Company in close support. The British barrage came down at 06.00 150 yards (140 m), the attackers closing up to it and then following as it crept forward. 3/4th Queen's was held up crossing concertina wire and then the flooded Polygonbeek stream under machine gun fire, and the men got too far behind the creeping barrage. However, the battalion attacked 'Juniper Trench' as planned, the bombers dealing with the concrete strongpoints or ' mebus ' as they had been trained. The battalion the moved on to take 'Judge Trench' on the Red Line objective, where it began consolidation, establishing machine gun posts and communications with the neighbouring division. Other battalions of 62nd Bde then passed through to take the second objective, 3/4th Queen's withdrawing to 'Jetty Warren' and digging in while the Germans kept up a heavy bombardment of the captured area. The battalion spent three days improving its positions under shellfire and was relieved early on 8 October. In its first offensive operation, deemed a success, the 3/4th Queen's had lost 3 officers and 61 ORs killed, 17 officers and 241 ORs wounded, and 21 ORs missing. Among the wounded was the CO, Lt-Col Kenneth Oswald.

3/4th Queen's went into the line again on the night of 22/23 October, holding it under heavy fire until 26 October, when it went back to Dickebusch Lake, having suffered a further 36 killed and wounded. It then alternated periods in the line at Reutel with periods of rest at Dickebusch or Zillebeke. It then moved south with 21st Division to First Army's area. 3/4th Queen's was among battalions of the Western Front selected to exchange with some from the Italian Front, but this plan was scrapped when the Germans launched a devastating counter-attack on Third Army after the Battle of Cambrai. 21st Division was sent to reinforce Third Army, taking over a sector south of Gouzeaucourt on 4 December. The line was quiet by then, and 3/4th Queen's served through the winter taking turns in the line at Heudicourt.

==== Disbandment ====
By now the BEF was suffering a critical manpower shortage, and on 11 February 1918 3/4th Queen's was disbanded. A large draft was sent to reinforce 7th Queen's serving in 18th (Eastern) Division while the transport went to 8th Division. Other drafts went to 1st, 6th and 8th Queen's. The residue of the battalion went to 20th Entrenching Bn, which carried out railway construction but was sucked into the fighting during the German Spring Offensive. During its brief service on the Western Front the battalion lost 5 officers and 174 ORs killed or died of wounds, 6 ORs died of disease, 22 officers and 366 ORs were wounded and 7 were taken prisoner.

==== Commanding officers ====
The following officers commanded 3/4th Queen's:

- Lt-Col Utten Hooke, 15 May 1915, killed 21 June 1917
- Lt-Col Kenneth Oswald, 21 June 1917, wounded 5 October 1917
- Maj Herbert Cannon, acting 5 October –21 November 1917
- Lt-Col Guy Sawyer (1st Royal Berkshire Regiment, 21 November 1917 to disbandment

=== 4/4th Battalion ===
Unusually, the 4th Queen's formed a 4th-Line battalion (4/4th). This was raised at Croydon in July 1915 from the depot company, and by September was at Windsor. In October it moved to huts at Purfleet in Essex and then in early 1916 to Crowborough. On 8 April it became the 4th (Reserve) Bn and on 1 September 1916 it absorbed the 5th (Reserve) Bn in the Home Counties Reserve Brigade at Tunbridge Wells. It was disbanded at Cambridge on 29 May 1919.

==== Commanding officers ====
The following officers commanded 4/4th Queen's:

- Maj Kenneth Elder, 23 July 1915 – 8 April 1916
- Lt-Col John Windham-Wright (from 3/5th Bn), 1 September 1916 – 19 November 1917
- Lt-Col William Robert Campion 19 November 1917, to France 10 April 1918
- Lt-Col Norman Rolls ( from 6th (Service) Bn), 30 April 1918 to demobilisation

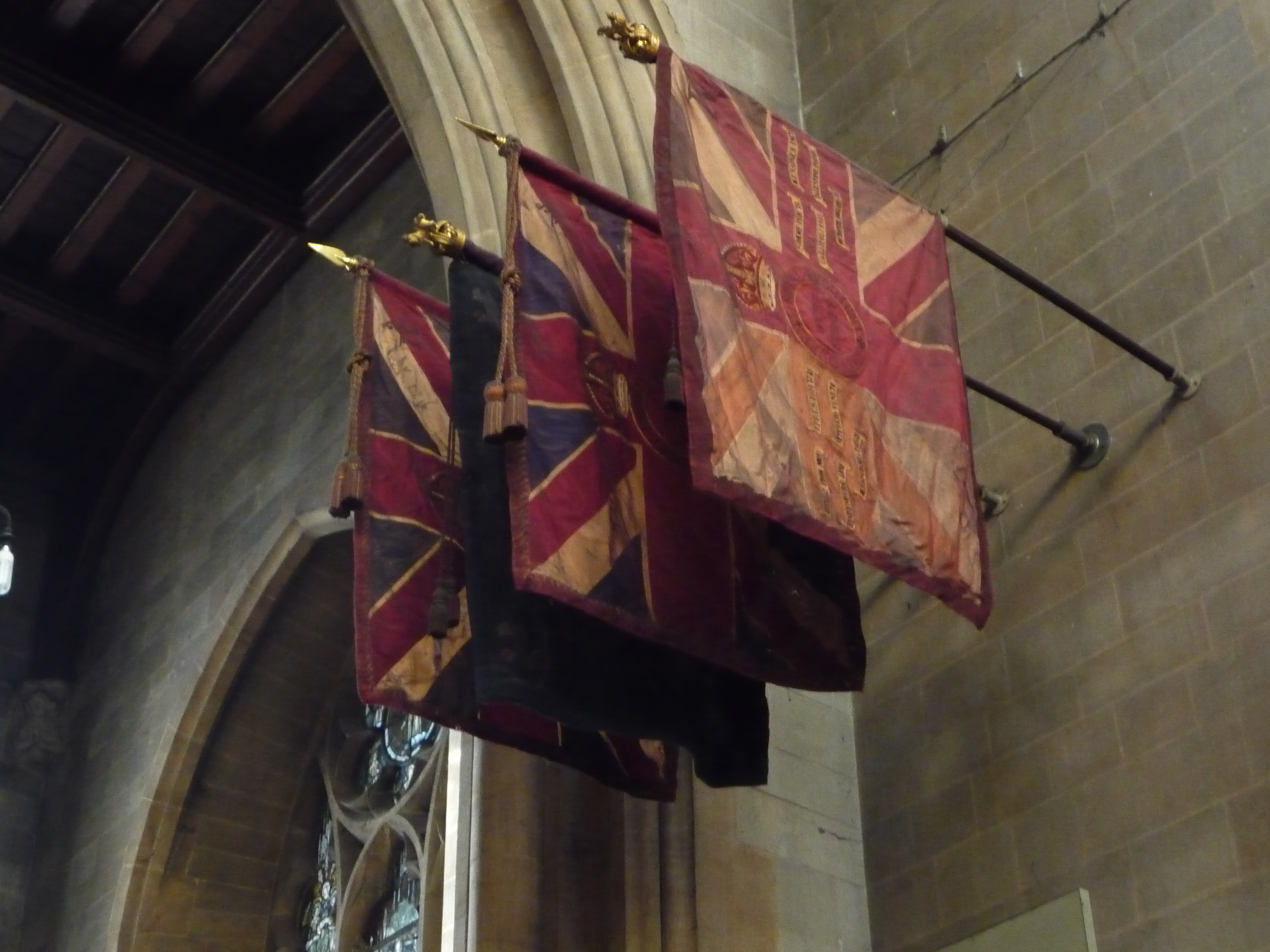
The King's and Regimental Colours of the 4th Queen's in Croydon Minster.

=== 19th Battalion ===
In 1915, when the 2nd Line of the TF was being readied for overseas service, the men who had signed up only for Home Service were separated and formed into provisional battalions. 69th Provisional Battalion (The Queen's) was formed on 19 June 1915 at Tunbridge Wells by amalgamating the Home Service men of the 3/4th and 2/5th Queen's, some 16 officers and 944 ORs. After working on coast defences at Eastbourne and Seaford in Sussex, the battalion moved to Lowestoft in Suffolk in July to join 5th Provisional Brigade. It took over the trench line covering the north of the harbour, and worked on extending the line with strongpoints and machine gun emplacements on the cliffs or beach, all linked up with barbed wire. Later a second line of defence was constructed, with dugouts and trench mortar emplacements. In April 1916 the 69th absorbed the 71st Provisional Bn (which had been formed from the Home Service TF details of the 4th and 5th Bns of the Buffs (East Kent Regiment) and the Royal West Kent Regiment). On 25 April 1916 Lowestoft was bombarded by the German fleet, but although there was considerable damage to property there were few casualties among the troops or civilians. There were also frequent air attacks by Zeppelins or seaplanes. The Military Service Act 1916 swept away the Home/Foreign service distinction, and all TF soldiers became liable for overseas service, if medically fit. The provisional battalions thus became anomalous, and on 1 January 1917 they became numbered battalions of their parent units: the 69th became 19th Queen's. Their role was physical conditioning to render men fit for drafting overseas, while carrying out Home Defence duties. 5th Provisional Brigade became 225th Mixed Brigade, and remained on coast defence until the Armistice. During the war some 400 officers and 5000 ORs passed through its ranks before being posted to service or reserve units. The battalion's strength varied widely, from just 400 effectives in June 1918 after sending emergency drafts to replace casualties suffered during the German spring offensive, to almost 1700 in August 1918, many of them previously wounded men being prepared for renewed active service. 19th Battalion was disbanded on 14 August 1919 at Lowestoft.

==== Commanding officer ====
The following officer commanded 18th Queen's:

- Lt-Col William Perkins, 1 January 1917 to demobilisation

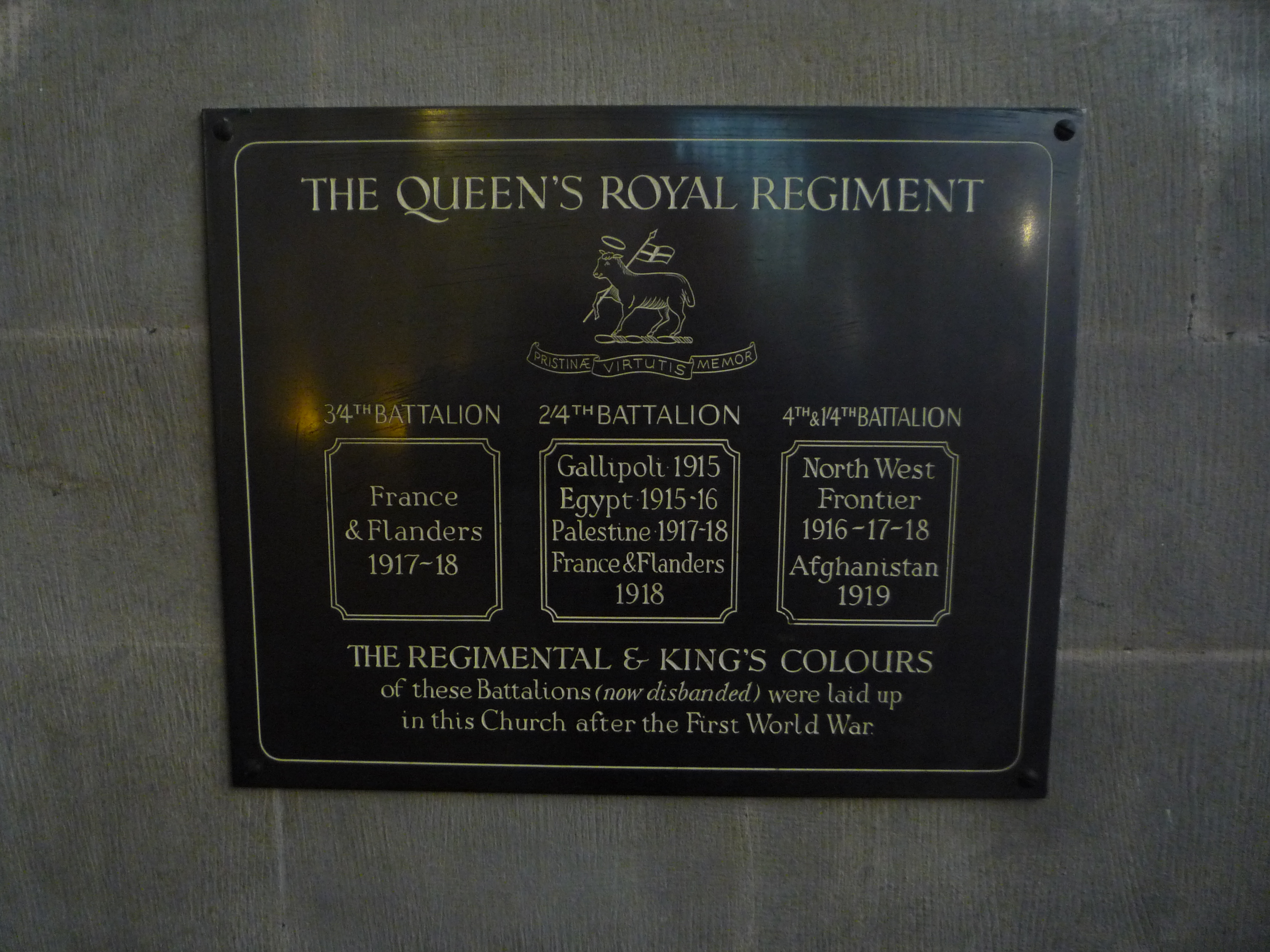
Plaque accompanying the Colours in Croydon Minster.

=== 53rd (Young Soldier) Battalion ===
This battalion was raised on 22 September 1914 at Dover as the 10th (Service) Battalion of the Royal Sussex Regiment, from the flood of volunteers coming forward to join 'Kitchener's Army'. It became a reserve battalion on 10 April 1915 to supply drafts to the 7th, 8th and 9th (Service) Bns of the Royal Sussex. In May 1915 it was at Colchester, then in September 1915 it moved to Shoreham-by-Sea, where it was part of the 5th Reserve Brigade. On 1 September 1916 it was converted into the 23rd Bn, Training Reserve (TR), becoming 25th (Young Soldier) Bn, TR, in May 1917. Then on 27 October 1917 it became 53rd (Young Soldier) Battalion of the Queen's at St Albans in 4th Reserve Brigade. The unit reverted to the status of a Service Battalion on 8 February 1919 and was sent to join the British Army of the Rhine, where it was absorbed by 2/4th Bn in April 1919.

=== 1st Volunteer Battalion ===
Croydon also raised a 'town guard' battalion of part-time volunteers in August 1914, known as the Croydon Riflemen. It was affiliated to the Volunteer Training Corps (VTC) on 20 February 1915 and became the 1/1st Battalion (Croydon) Surrey Volunteer Training Corps on 8 March. The Volunteers practised on miniature rifle ranges and drilled twice-weekly, some at the Mitcham Road Barracks of 4th Queen's. From 1915 to 1917 the unit constructed some of the trenches of the Outer London Defences at Caterham. In 1917 the battalion was given responsibility for guarding part of the London, Brighton and South Coast Railway and in 1918 it manned anti-aircraft searchlight stations in Croydon during air raids. In May 1916 the VTCs were brought under the County Territorial Associations, and the unit became the 1st Battalion, Surrey Volunteer Regiment, then on 1 March 1918 the 1st (Croydon) and 12th (Norbury) Surrey Bns merged to become 1st Volunteer Battalion, The Queen's (Royal West Surrey Regiment), virtually recreating the pre-1908 title and role of the 4th Queen's. The unit was stood down by 31 October 1919.

== Interwar years ==
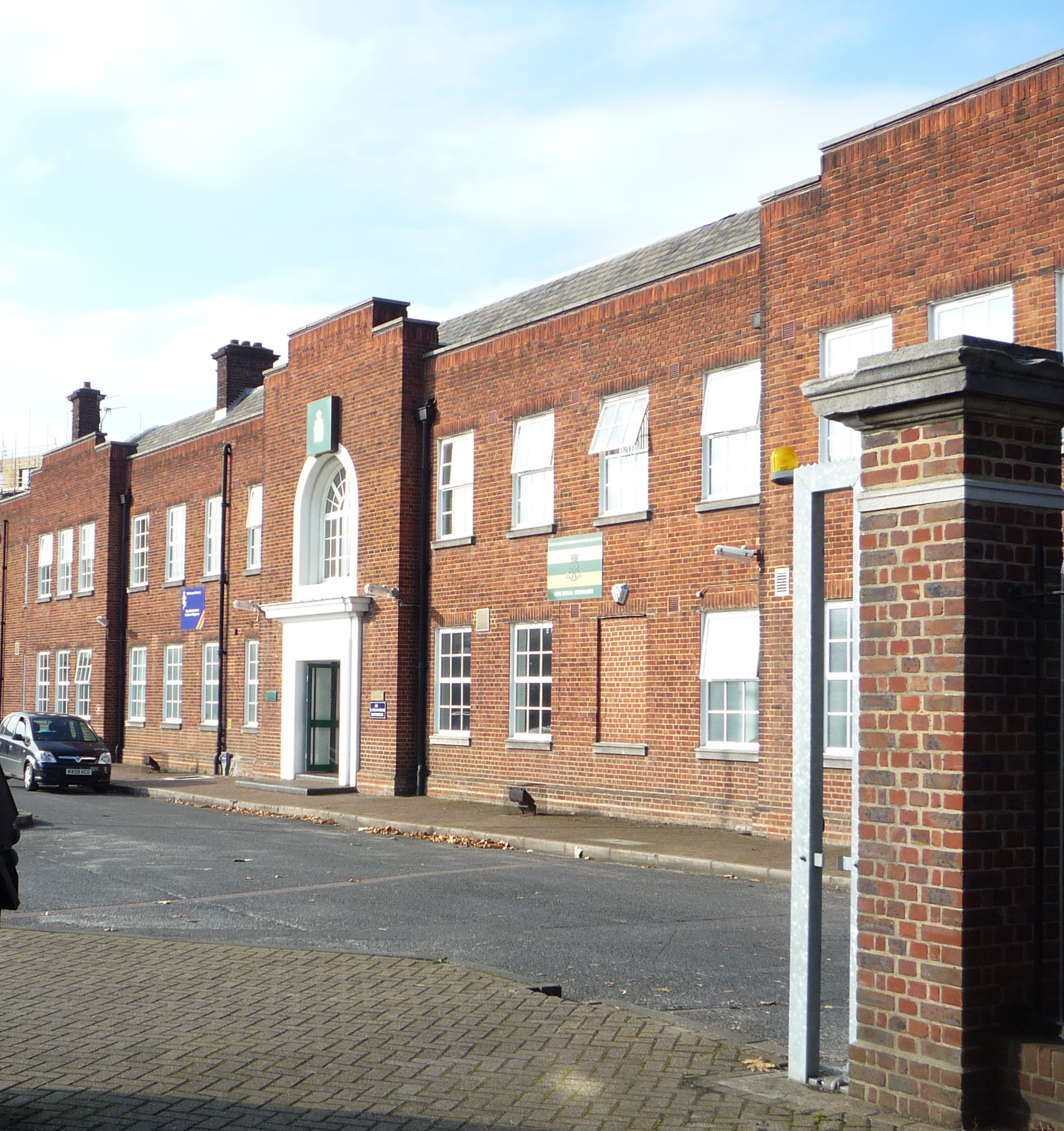
Mitcham Road Barracks, as rebuilt in the 1930s.

When the TF was reformed on 7 February 1920 the 4th Queen's was reconstituted at Mitcham Road Barracks, once more forming part of 131st (Surrey) Brigade in 44th (Home Counties) Division. The TF was reorganised as the Territorial Army (TA) the following year.

During the 1930s the increasing need for anti-aircraft (AA) defence, particularly for London, was addressed by converting a number of TA infantry battalions into AA units. In 1938 the 4th Queen's was converted to the searchlight (S/L) role, adopting the subsidiary title of 63rd Searchlight Regiment, and numbering its companies 438–440. It formed part of 47 AA Brigade in 5 AA Division.

== World War II ==
=== 63rd (Queen's) Searchlight Regiment ===
==== Mobilisation ====
90 cm 'Projector Anti-Aircraft', displayed at Fort Nelson, Portsmouth

The TA's AA units were mobilised on 23 September 1938 during the Munich Crisis, with units manning their emergency positions within 24 hours, even though many did not yet have their full complement of men or equipment. The emergency lasted three weeks, and they were stood down on 13 October. In February 1939 the existing AA defences came under the control of a new Anti-Aircraft Command. In June a partial mobilisation of TA units was begun in a process known as 'couverture', whereby each AA unit did a month's tour of duty in rotation to man selected AA and searchlight positions. On 24 August, ahead of the declaration of World War II, AA Command was fully mobilised at its war stations.

47 AA Brigade's role was to provide S/L coverage of Hampshire, supporting the AA guns of the Southampton Gun Defence Area. However, on 5 November 439 S/L Bty was detached to come under the command of 98th Heavy Anti-Aircraft Regiment, Royal Artillery, at Bristol, deploying 24 teams armed with Lewis guns to defend Avonmouth Docks. These detachments were withdrawn 22–24 February 1940 and went to Plymouth. By the Spring of 1940, 63 S/L Rgt HQ was at Bentley, Hampshire. In April 1940 the newly formed 474 S/L Bty arrived from the West of England and was attached to 63rd S/L Rgt. This battery took over the S/L layout in the Kings Worthy area controlled by RAF Tangmere, with Battery HQ at Winton Lodge, later at Worthy Park. Some of the new 150 cm S/Ls were delivered in April 1940 to supplement the older 90 cm lights.

==== Battle of Britain ====
Formation sign of 5 AA Division.

From the beginning of June there were almost nightly alerts as the Battle of Britain got under way, and on the night of 18/19 June several Luftwaffe bombers were picked up by searchlights of 63rd Rgt and destroyed by AA guns and night fighters.

On 3 July 1940, 3rd (Ulster) S/L Rgt, just returned from the Dunkirk evacuation, took over control of 474 S/L Bty and the Kings Worthy layout. Later, another newly formed battery, 524 S/L Bty, was assigned to 63rd S/L Rgt.

On 1 August 1940 all the converted searchlight units were transferred to the Royal Artillery (RA) and their companies were redesignated 'batteries'. The 4th Queen's became 63rd (Queen's) Searchlight Regiment, but was awarded the privilege of retaining its Queen's regimental cap badge and buttons.

Southampton was attacked by daylight on 13 August and several times in September. However, the night bombing Bitz, starting in September, saw the S/L units fully engaged, with three big raids on Southampton in November and more in December and January 1941.

The S/L layouts had initially been based on a spacing of 3,500 yards (3,200 m), but due to equipment shortages this had been extended to 6,000 yards (5,500 m) by September 1940. In November this was changed to clusters of three lights to improve illumination, but this meant that the clusters had to be spaced 10,400 yards (9,500 m) apart. The cluster system was an attempt to improve the chances of picking up enemy bombers and keeping them illuminated for engagement by AA guns or night fighters. Eventually, one light in each cluster was to be equipped with Searchlight Control (SLC) radar and act as 'master light', but the radar equipment was still in short supply.

A new 524 Bty joined the regiment on 14 November 1940. This had been formed at 232 S/L Training Rgt at Devizes from a cadre of experienced officers and men provided by 66th S/L Rgt. 63rd (4th Queen's) S/L Rgt, in turn, supplied a cadre to 230th S/L Training Rgt at Blandford Camp where it provided the basis for a new 561 S/L Bty formed on 17 April 1941. This battery later joined 69th (3rd City of London) S/L Rgt.

==== Mid-War ====
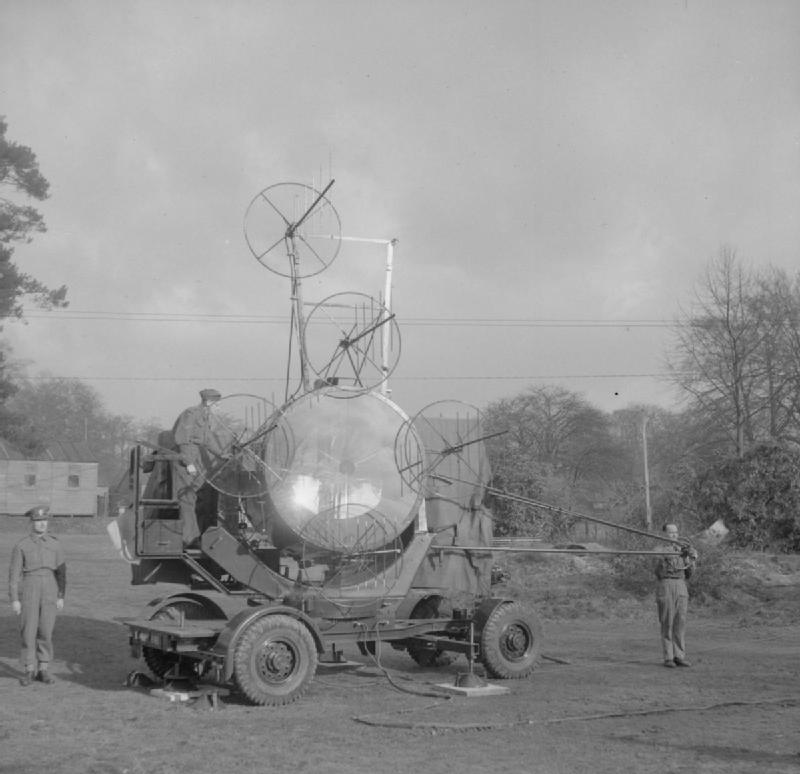
150 cm Searchlight equipped with SLC radar.

The Blitz is considered to have ended in mid-May 1941, though periodic raids continued, such that against Southampton in July. By October 1941 the availability of SLC radar was sufficient to allow AA Command's S/L sites to be 'declustered' into single-light sites spaced at 10,400-yard intervals in 'Indicator Belts' in the approaches to the GDAs, and 'Killer Belts' at 6000-yard spacing to cooperate with the RAF's night-fighters.

In the autumn of 1941 the regiment transferred to 38 Light AA Bde, which provided the S/Ls for 1 AA Division in the London Inner Artillery Zone (IAZ). 438 Searchlight Bty transferred to 28th (Essex) S/L Rgt on 23 January 1942 and was replaced by 397 S/L Bty from 49th (West Yorkshire) S/L Rgt.

=== 127th (Queen's) Light Anti-Aircraft Regiment ===
However, AA Command had a critical shortage of Light AA gun (LAA) units, and had begun a process of converting some S/L units to the role. 63rd (Queen's) was one of the regiments chosen for conversion, becoming 127th (Queen's) Light Anti-Aircraft Regiment in February, with 397, 439, 440 and 524 S/L Btys becoming 416, 439, 440 and 420 LAA Btys respectively.

Initially, the new regiment returned to 38 LAA Bde after training, though 440 LAA Bty was attached to 49 AA Bde in 1 AA Division. However, in July 127th LAA Rgt transferred to 64 AA Bde in 8 AA Division, which was having to deal with a wave of 'hit-and-run' attacks by Luftwaffe Fighter-bombers on coastal targets in South West England.

In early December 1942, the regiment transferred from 64 AA Bde to 67 AA Bde in 3 AA Group, which had taken over 8 AA Division's responsibilities.

It moved again to 51 LAA Bde in 6 AA Group in Scotland in April 1943, with 420 LAA Bty remaining directly attached to 3 AA Group for a few weeks before rejoining. However, soon afterwards the regiment mobilised on a three-battery establishment for overseas service (420 Bty remaining with 51 AA Bde, transferring to 85 LAA Rgt on 11 June 1943) and joined 21st Army Group preparing for the planned Allied invasion of Europe (Operation Overlord). The regiment was designated as a Base & Port Defences unit.

==== Normandy ====
127th LAA Regiment's role in the Normandy landings was to defend the artificial Mulberry harbour under 76 AA Bde. The regiment manned a 40 mm Bofors gun on each of 34 'Phoenix' caissons, four more on three 'Corncob' blockships, and 16 on the Mulberry HQ ship, HMS Despatch, which had been converted into an AA cruiser. The regiment also had 62 LAA Bty of 20th LAA Rgt under command for the operation.

The first caissons and blockships sailed on D-Day itself, and 76 AA Bde reported that seven Phoenixes and three Corncobs manned by 127 LAA Rgt had been successfully sunk in place on 11 June. By 16 June, 17 LAA guns on Phoenixes and four on Corncobs were ready for action. In the early stages, the only casualty was one Phoenix that overturned, tipping its crew into the water. Luftwaffe day and night attacks over the beachhead were common, but not particularly effective. Assembly of the artificial harbour at Arromanches progressed over the succeeding days, but a severe storm on the night of 20/21 June caused serious damage: most of the gun crews were taken off by boat, but one Phoenix under tow capsized with 12 men of 127th LAA Rgt (four of whom were rescued), several other guns were damaged and half the ammunition was washed overboard. Afterwards, 76 AA Bde reduced the manning to 10 guns on Phoenixes, together with the four on the Corncobs and 16 on Despatch. Regimental HQ was established ashore at Manvieux, coming under the operational control of 125th LAA Rgt.

As the land campaign progressed, 127th LAA Rgt continued to protect the vital Mulberry, latterly with HMS Adventure replacing Despatch. By the end of August, once 21st Army Group had broken out of the Normandy bridgehead, 105 AA Bde arrived to take over command of some of the AA units in the bridgehead, including 127th LAA Rgt.

==== Antwerp ====
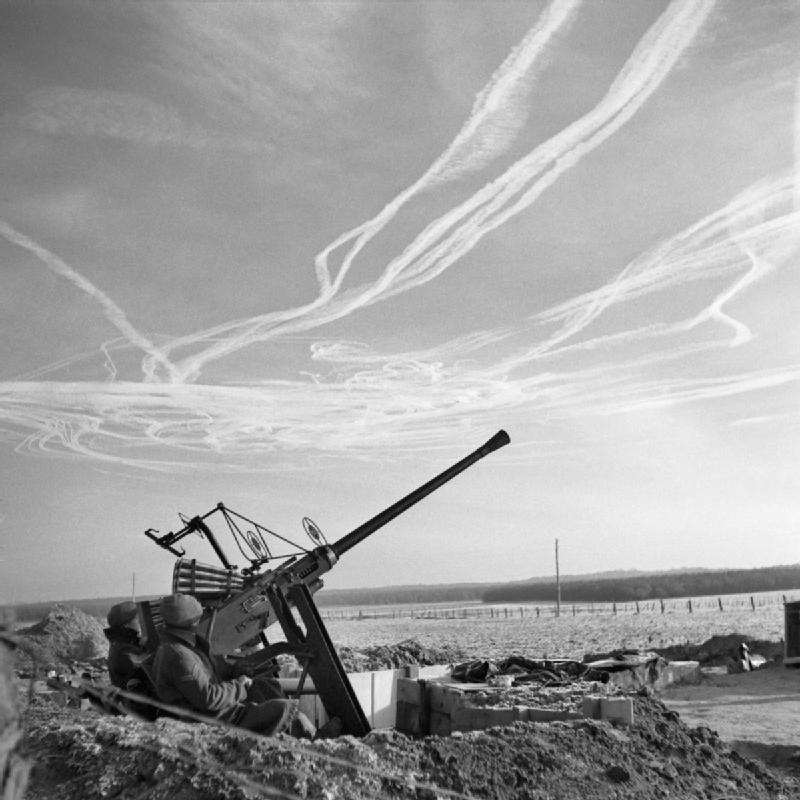
Bofors gun and crew in NW Europe, winter 1944–45.

105 AA Brigade and 127th LAA Rgt were withdrawn from the Normandy Base Area between 5 and 14 October, and moved up to reinforce the AA defences of Antwerp. This port was vital for 21st Army Group's supplies, and the defences had to cover both the harbour and its approaches up the Scheldt Estuary. 127th LAA Regiment was assigned to the 'Scheldt South' AA layout under 105 AA Bde. One of the principal LAA roles, in conjunction with searchlights, was to deal with mine-laying aircraft. Antwerp itself was heavily bombarded by V-1 flying bombs but there was little air activity over the estuary.

The regiment remained in the North West Europe theatre until VE Day, still in the 'South Scheldt' layout, under the command of 75 AA Bde. 127th (Queen's) LAA Rgt remained in British Army of the Rhine until 1 March 1946 when it was ordered into suspended animation, completing the process on 28 March.

== Postwar ==
When the TA was reconstituted on 1 January 1947, the regiment was reformed at Croydon as 598 (Queen's) Light Anti-Aircraft Regiment. The full subsidiary title (4th Bn The Queen's Regiment) was added in about 1950–51, when the regiment adopted a supplementary shoulder title of 'QUEEN'S' in white on a red backing worn below the RA shoulder title. 598 LAA Regiment formed part of 106 AA Brigade (TA), based at Kingston upon Thames. When AA Command was disbanded in 1955, 598 LAA Regiment merged with two other Surrey units, 565 (Surrey) LAA/SL Regiment at Kingston, and 566 (City of London Rifles) LAA Regiment, at Sutton, to form a new 565th Light Anti-Aircraft Regiment at Sutton in 30 AA Bde with the following organisation:

- P (City of London Rifles) Bty
- Q (4th Queen's) Bty
- R (Surrey) Bty
- S (City of London Rifles) Bty

In 1961 a further reorganisation saw 565 Regiment converted back to infantry and merged with 5th and 6th Queen's to form 3rd (V) Battalion in the new The Queen's Royal Surrey Regiment with C Company based at Croydon.

== Heritage & ceremonial ==
=== Uniforms ===
The 2nd Surrey RVC wore a Rifle green uniform with scarlet facings. It retained this uniform even after it became a volunteer battalion of the Queen's (which wore red with blue facings), simply adopting the regiment's Paschal Lamb badge on its helmet plate. However, after 1908 the 4th Queen's changed to red with blue facings.

On overseas service during World War I the battalions wore the foreign service helmet with a distinguishing flash on the left hand side of the pagri. In the case of 1/4th Queen's this was a piece of regimental ribbon (a wide blue stripe edged with green stripes separated by thinner red stripes). 2/4th Queen's in 53rd (W) Division wore a dark blue diamond vertically bisected by a narrow red stripe. 53rd (W) Division's insignia was the Prince of Wales's feathers.

=== Honorary Colonels ===
The following served as Honorary Colonel of the unit:

- William Monson, 1st Viscount Oxenbridge, appointed 18 March 1882
- Sir Frederick Edridge, appointed 7 April 1906
- Colonel Henry Cubitt, 2nd Baron Ashcombe, CB, TD, appointed 12 July 1922
- J.M. Newnham, OBE, appointed 19 October 1927 (former CO of the 1st Surrey VB of the VTC).

=== Battle Honours ===
The 4th Queen's was awarded the following Battle honours:

- Second Boer War: South Africa 1900–1902
- First World War: North West Frontier 1916–1917, Suvla, Landing at Suvla, Scimitar Hill, Gallipoli 1915, Rumani, Egypt 1915–1916, Marne 1918, Soissonais, Ourgq, Gaza, El Musha, Jerusalem, Jericho, Tell Asur, Palestine 1917–1918, Ypres 1917, Broodseinde, Passchendaele 1917, Cambrai, France and Flanders 1914–1918.

The Royal Artillery does not carry battle honours, so none were awarded to the battalion for service during the Second World War

=== Memorials ===
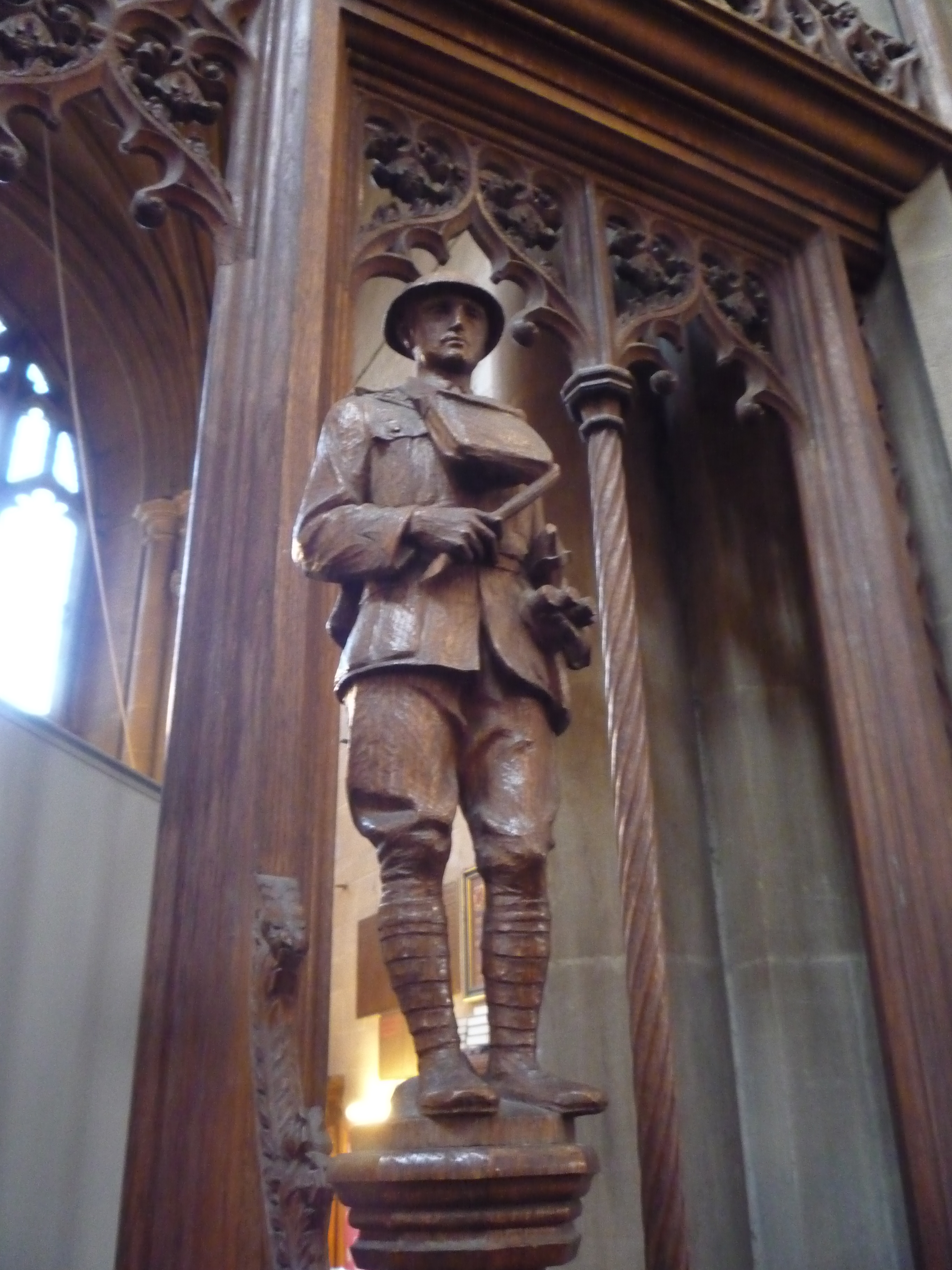
Wooden figure of a First World War infantry officer on the memorial screen in Croydon Minster.

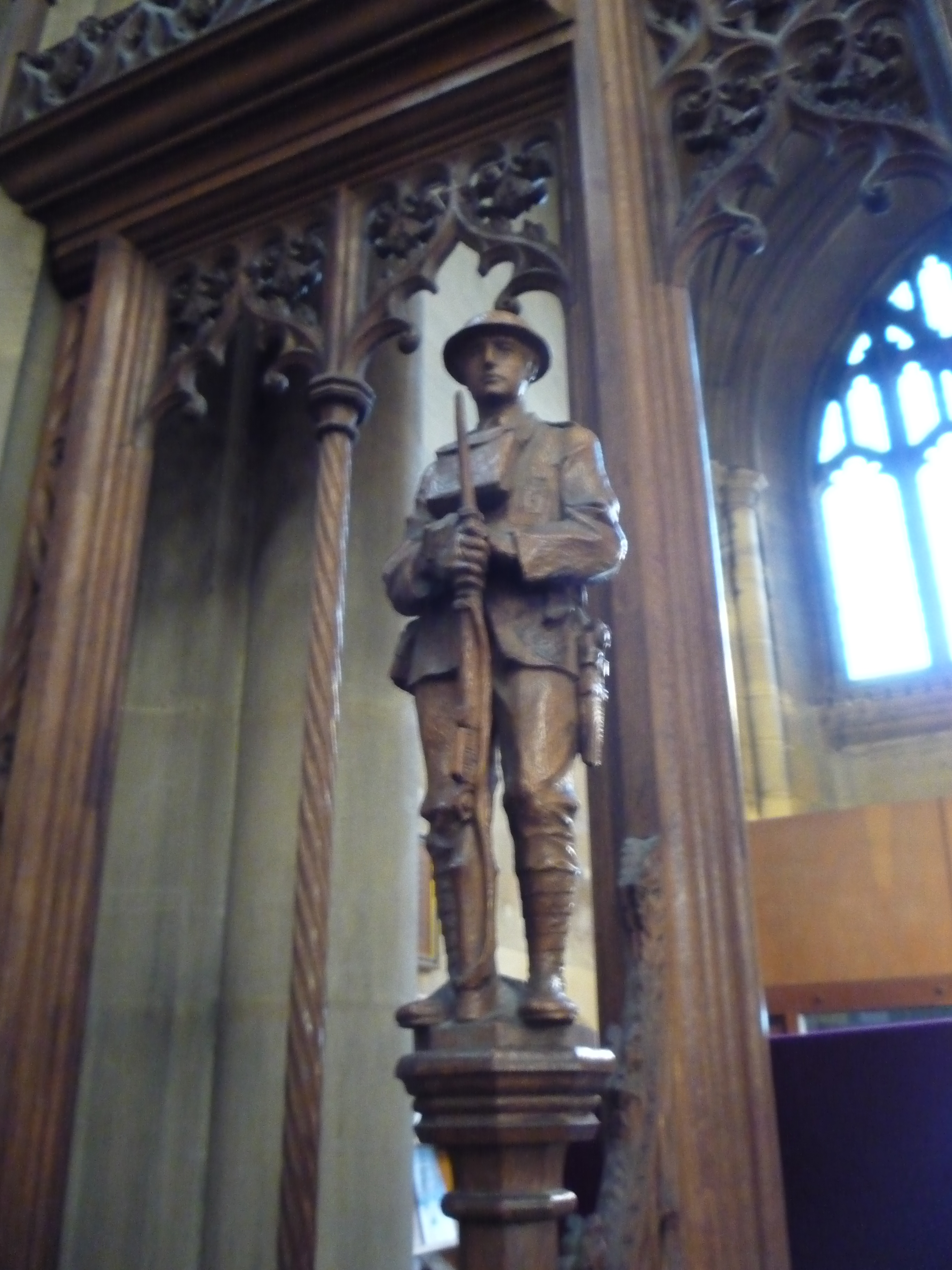
Wooden figure of a First World War infantryman on the memorial screen in Croydon Minster.

A pair of brass plaques in the entrance to Croydon Town Hall list the names of 103 residents of the town who served in the Second Boer War with 1st VB The Queen's. A wooden panel was set up in the foyer of the town hall in 1953, which gives a potted history of the battalion including its changes of title, battle honours, and service during the Second World War.

A war memorial to 4th Queens in the form of a carved oak screen was erected in 1922 in Croydon Parish Church (Croydon Minster since 2011), and the King's Colours of the 2/4th and 3/4th Bns were laid up there during the dedication on 22 November 1922. The old Regimental colours of the 4th Queen's were also laid up in the church on 5 April 1964.
