= Mitcham Road Barracks =

- Croydon
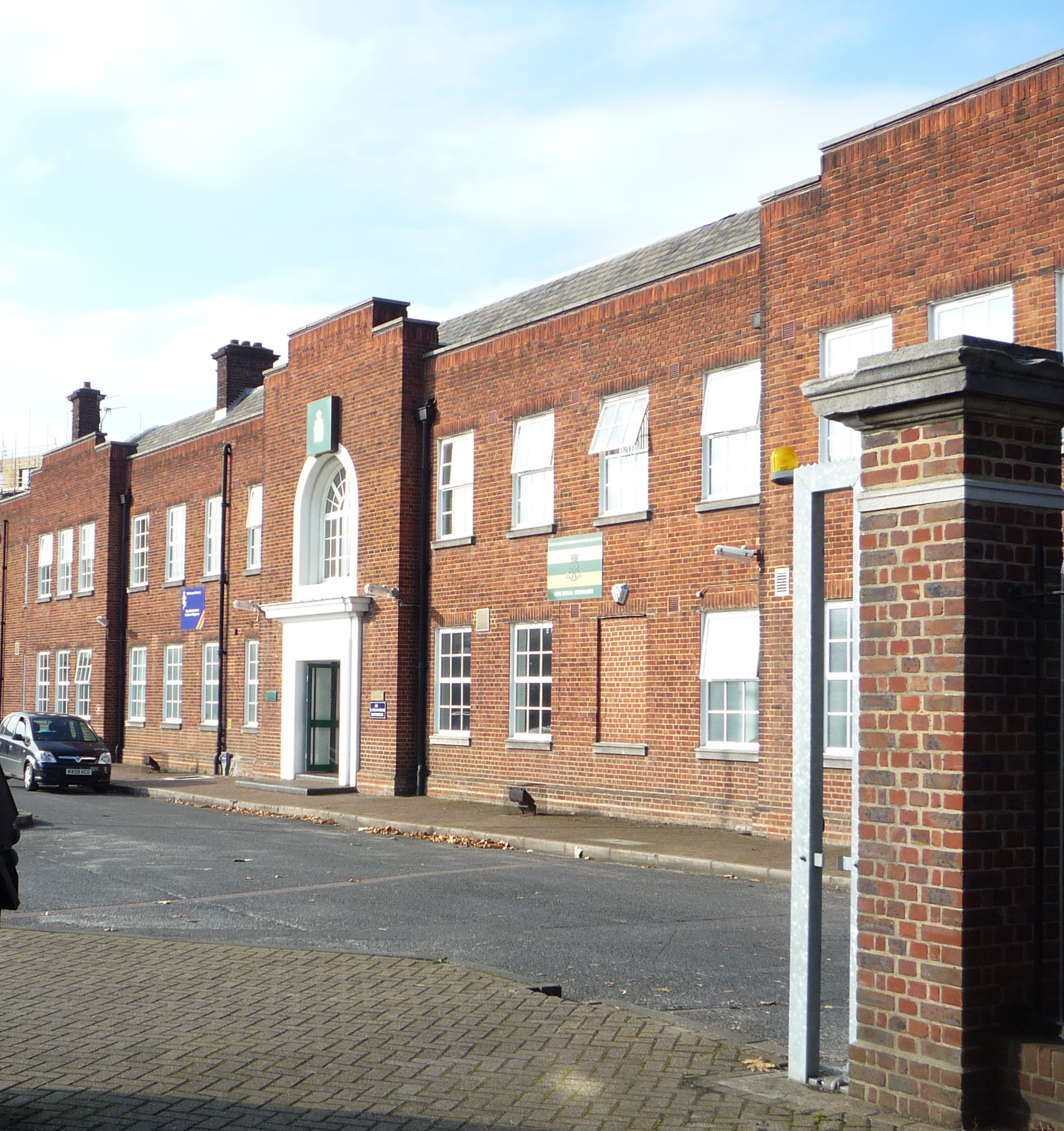
- Mitcham Road Barracks, Croydon

Site information
- Type: Drill hall

Location
- Location within London
- Coordinates: 51.37781°N 0.11003°W

Site history
- Built: 1794
- Built for: War Office
- In use: 1794-Present

Mitcham Road Barracks is an Army Reserve centre in Croydon, London, with a history dating back to 1794.

== History ==
The barracks were designed as a depot for recruits of the Grenadier Guards, the Coldstream Guards and the Scots Guards regiments and were completed, as part of the British response to the French Revolution, in 1794. The barracks became the headquarters of the 2nd Surrey Rifle Volunteers in 1859. The 2nd Surrey Rifle Volunteers evolved to become the 4th Battalion, Queen's Royal Regiment (West Surrey) in 1908. The battalion was mobilised at the drill hall in August 1914 before being deployed to India. After benefitting from a major modernisation of the barracks in the 1930s, the battalion became a searchlight regiment in 1938 and a light anti-aircraft regiment in 1942.

The battalion was reconstituted as 598th Light Anti-Aircraft Regiment, Royal Artillery in 1947 and evolved to become a battery within 565th Light Anti-Aircraft Regiment Royal Artillery in 1955, while still based at the Mitcham Road Barracks. The unit reverted to its county infantry regiment status title as part of the 3rd Battalion, The Queen's Royal Surrey Regiment in 1961. The battalion was reduced to company size as D Company, 6th (Territorial) Battalion, The Queen's Regiment (Queen's Surreys), still based at the Mitcham Road Barracks, in 1967. However the company was disbanded following a reorganisation in 1971.

Meanwhile, C (Kent and County of London) Squadron, the Royal Yeomanry had also been formed at the Mitcham Road Barracks in 1967; it evolved to become C (Kent and Sharpshooters Yeomanry) Company, the Royal Yeomanry in 1999.

== Current use ==
The barracks still remains an active Army Reserve Centre. It currently accommodates:

- C Squadron (Kent and Sharpshooters Yeomanry), The Royal Yeomanry, in Sharpshooter House
- 150 Platoon, 133 Divisional Recovery Company, 103 Force Support Battalion, Royal Electrical and Mechanical Engineers
- Mortar Platoon of B Company, 4th Battalion, Parachute Regiment, in Arnhem House
