= Glutinous rice =

Type of rice

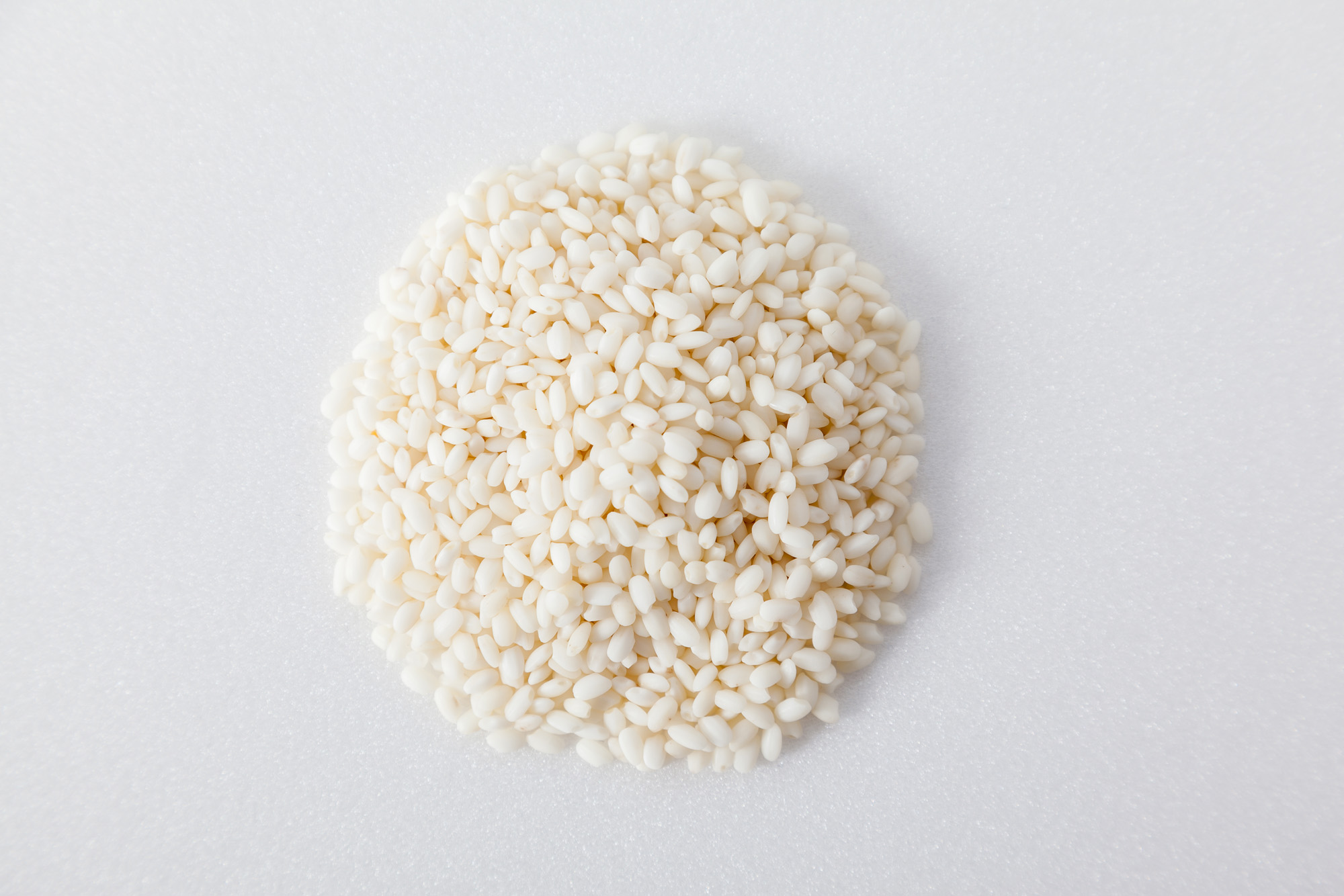
Short-grain glutinous rice from Japan

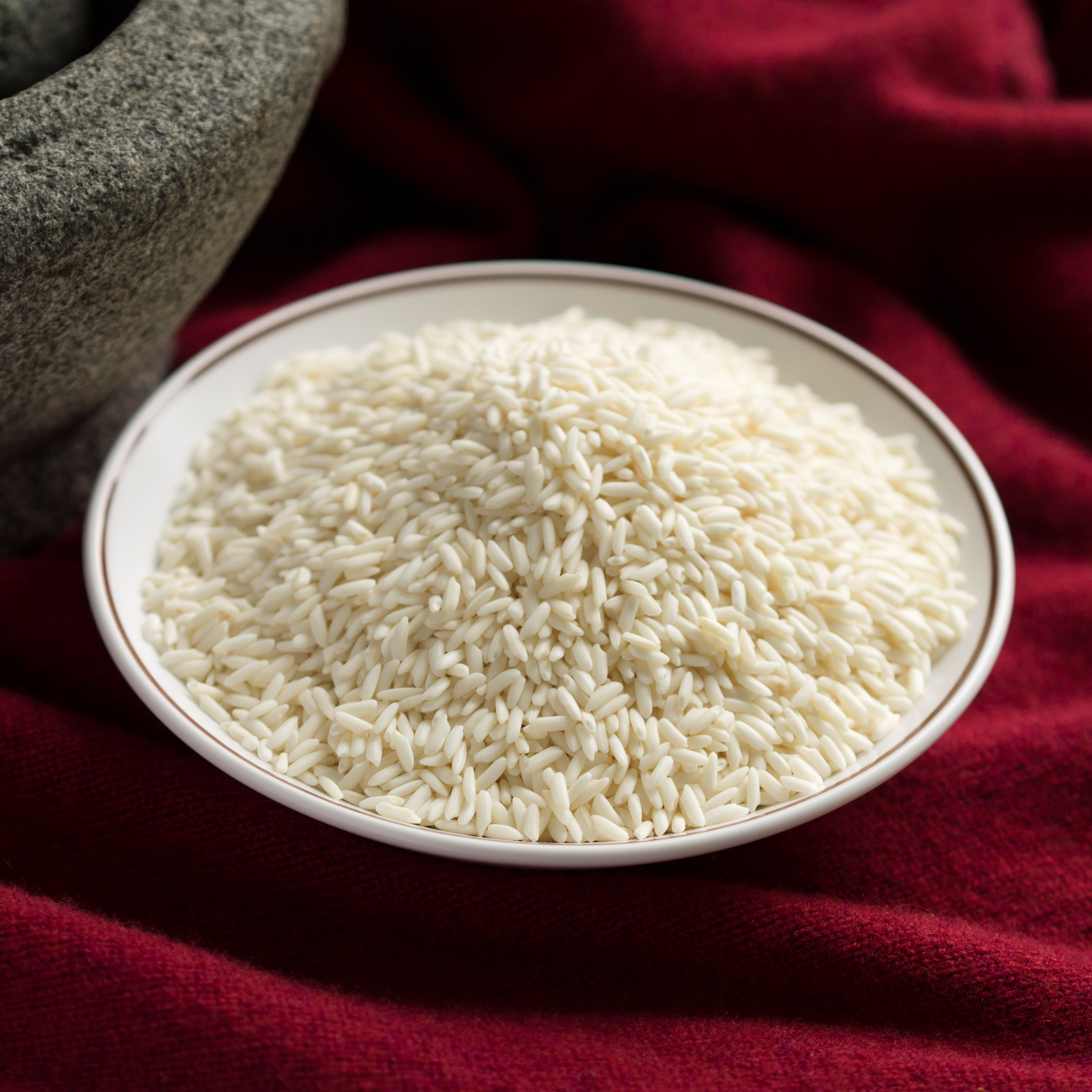
Long-grain glutinous rice from Thailand

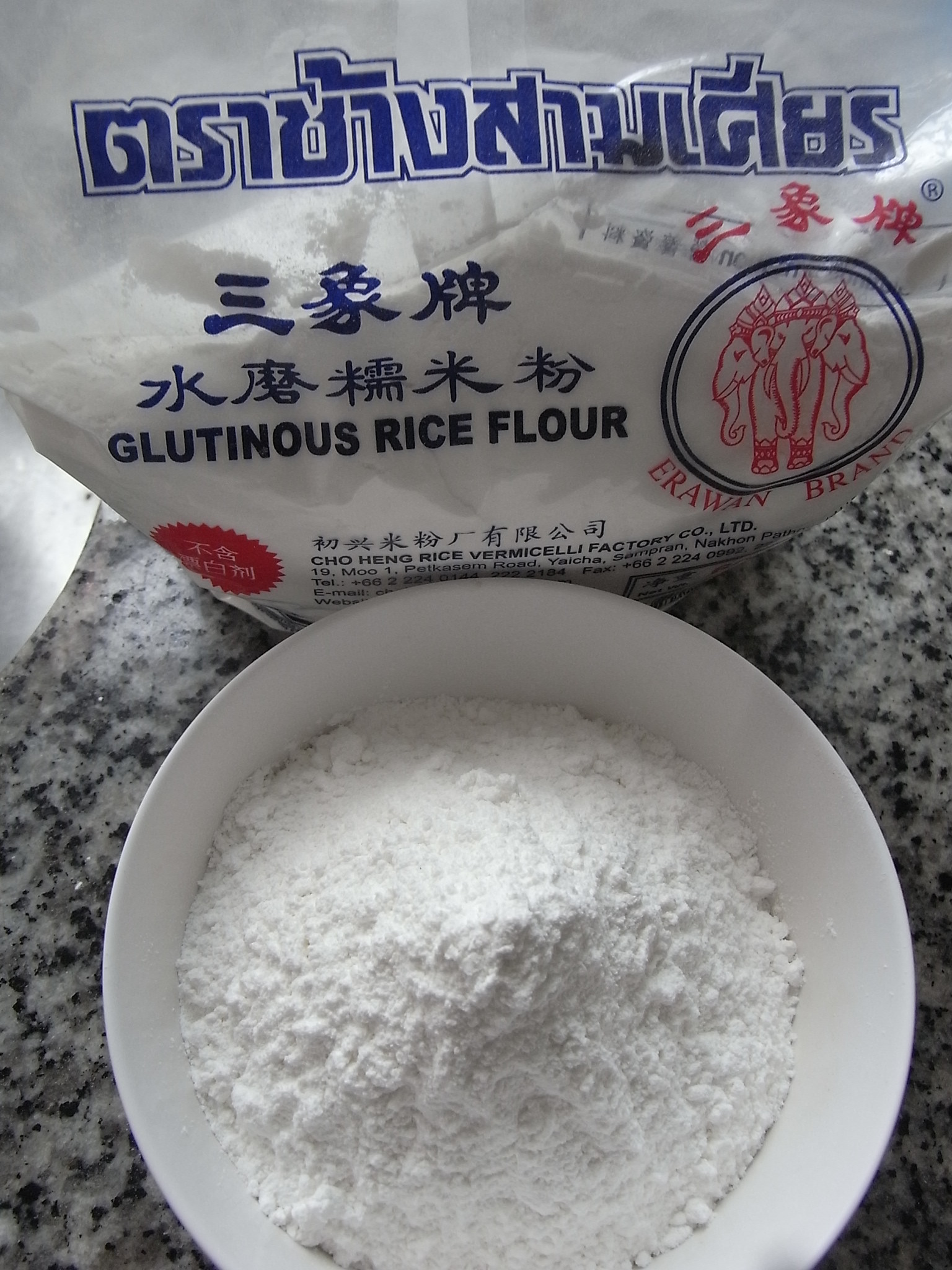
Glutinous rice flour

Glutinous rice (Oryza sativa var. glutinosa; also called sticky rice, sweet rice or waxy rice) is a type of rice grown mainly in Southeast Asia and the northeastern regions of South Asia, which has opaque grains and very low amylose content and is especially sticky when cooked. It is widely consumed across Asia.

It is called glutinous (Latin: glūtinōsus) in the sense of being glue-like or sticky, and not in the sense of containing gluten (which, like all rice, it does not). While often called sticky rice, it differs from non-glutinous strains of japonica rice, which also becomes sticky to some degree when cooked. There are numerous cultivars of glutinous rice, which include japonica, indica and tropical japonica strains.

== History ==
The origin of glutinous rice is difficult to ascertain because of its long-standing cultural importance across a wide geographical region in Asia.

A 2002 genetic study discovered that the waxy mutation that disrupted amylose synthesis likely has a single origin. This is supported by the fact that all glutinous rice accessions in the study contain the same mutation. From comparisons of subsequent mutations in the different accessions in the study, it was found that the progenitor haplotype is highest among Southeast Asian glutinous rice cultivars, indicating strongly that the waxy mutation first arose in Southeast Asia, likely in the upland regions of Mainland Southeast Asia, before spreading to the rest of Asia.

The waxy mutation is also known to have first arisen in temperate japonica rice, where it is far more common, before spreading to tropical japonica rice (javanica) and indica cultivars via gene flow.

== Cultivation ==
Glutinous rice is cultivated in countries across Asia, Southeast Asia, South Asia, and East Asia, including Laos, Thailand, Cambodia, Vietnam, Malaysia, Indonesia, Myanmar, Nepal, Bangladesh, Bhutan, Northeast India, China, Japan, Korea, Taiwan, Sri Lanka, and the Philippines. In Laos, it is estimated that 85% of the rice produced is glutinous rice.

As of 2013, the International Rice Genebank (IRGC) has preserved approximately 6,530 varieties of glutinous rice from five continents—Asia, South America, North America, Europe, and Africa. The International Rice Research Institute (IRRI) has referred to Laos as a "collector's paradise" for its remarkable diversity of glutinous rice. IRRI-trained collectors have gathered over 13,500 samples and 3,200 distinct varieties from Laos alone, making it home to the largest known biodiversity of sticky rice in the world.

== Composition ==
Glutinous rice is distinguished from other types of rice by having no (or negligible amounts of) amylose and high amounts of amylopectin (the two components of starch). Amylopectin is responsible for the sticky quality of glutinous rice. The difference has been traced to a single mutation that farmers selected.

Like all types of rice, glutinous rice does not contain dietary gluten (i.e. does not contain glutenin and gliadin) and should be safe for gluten-free diets.

Glutinous rice can be consumed milled or unmilled (that is, with the bran removed or not removed). Milled glutinous rice is white and fully opaque (unlike non-glutinous rice varieties, which are somewhat translucent when raw), whereas the bran can give unmilled glutinous rice a purple or black colour. Black and purple glutinous rice are distinct strains of white glutinous rice. In developing Asia, there is little regulation, and some governments have issued advisories about toxic dyes being added to colour-adulterated rice. Both black and white glutinous rice can be cooked as discrete grains or ground into flour and cooked as a paste or gel.

=== Chemistry and structural composition ===
The structure of amylose with alpha 1-4 glycosidic bonds

The structure of amylopectin with alpha 1-4 and alpha 1-6 glycosidic bonds

Amylose and amylopectin are both components of starch and polysaccharides made from D-glucose units. The big difference between the two is that amylose is linear because it only has αlpha-1,4-glycosidic bonds. Amylopectin, though, is a branched polysaccharide because it has αlpha-1,4-glycosidic bonds with occasional αlpha-1,6-glycosidic bonds around every 22 D-glucose units. Glutinous rice is nearly 100% composed of amylopectin and almost completely lacks its counterpart, amylose, in its starch granules. A nonglutinous rice grain contains amylose at about 10–30% weight by weight and amylopectin at about 70–90% weight by weight.

Glutinous or waxy type of starches occur in maize, sorghum, wheat, and rice. An interesting characteristic of glutinous rice is that it stains red when iodine is added, whereas nonglutinous rice stains blue. This phenomenon occurs when iodine is mixed with iodide to form tri-iodide and penta-iodide. Penta-iodide intercalates between the starch molecules and stains amylose and amylopectin blue and red, respectively. The gelation and viscous texture of glutinous rice is due to amylopectin being more hygroscopic than amylose, thus water enters the starch granule, causing it to swell, while the amylose leaves the starch granule and becomes part of a colloidal solution. In other words, the higher the amylopectin content, the higher the swelling of the starch granule.

Though the amylopectin content plays a major role in the defined characteristic of viscosity in glutinous rice, factors such as heat also play a very important role in the swelling since it enhances the uptake of water into the starch granule significantly.

The high amylopectin content of waxy or glutinous starches is genetically controlled by the waxy or wax gene. Its quality of greater viscosity and gelation is dependent on the distribution of the amylopectin unit chains. Grains that have this gene are considered mutants, which explains why most of them are selectively bred to create a grain that is close to having or has a 0% amylose content. The table below summarizes the amylose and amylopectin content of different starches, waxy and nonwaxy:

Proportion of amylose and amylopectin in various starch sources
Starch	Amylose %	Amylopectin %
Potato	20	80
Sweet potato	18	82
Arrowroot	21	79
Tapioca	17	83
Corn (maize)	28	72
Waxy maize	0	100
Wheat	26	74
Rice (long grain)	22	78

The soaking of the glutinous rice is an elemental step in the preparation of mochi, either traditionally or industrially. During this process, glutinous rice decreases in protein content as it is soaked in water. The chemicals that make up the flavour of plain or "natural" mochi are ethyl acetate, ethanol, 2-butanol, 2 methyl 1-propanol, 1-butanol, isoamyl alcohol, 1-pentanol and propane acid.

Mochi is usually composed solely of glutinous rice, however, some variations may include the additions of salt, spices and flavorings such as cinnamon (cinnamaldehyde). Food additives such as sucrose, sorbitol or glycerol may be added to increase viscosity and therefore increase gelatinization. Additives that slow down retrogradation are not usually added since mochi has a very stable shelf life due to its high amylopectin content.

== Use in foods ==
Glutinous rice is used in a wide variety of traditional dishes in different countries. They include the following:

=== Bangladesh ===
Especially in the eastern regions (Chittagong, Cox's Bazar, Sylhet areas) of Bangladesh, glutinous rice is known as binni chal (Bangla: বিন্নি চাল) or binni sôil (বিন্নি চইল) in Chittagong, both meaning "husked sticky rice" in Bangla. Both white and pink varieties are cultivated at many homestead farms. Unhusked sticky rice is called binni dhan. Boiled or steamed binni chal is referred to as binni bhat. Served with a curry of fish or meat, binni bhat is a popular breakfast. Sometimes, it is eaten simply with a splash of date palm sugar or jaggery, salt, and shredded coconut. Binni dhan is also used to make khoi (popped rice similar to popcorn) and chida (flattened, beaten rice).

Many other sweet items, or types of pitha, made with binni chal are also popular in the region.

One such pitha is atikka pitha. It is made with a mixture of cubed or thinly sliced coconut, white or brown sugar (specifically date palm sugar), ripe bananas, milk, and binni chal, all wrapped in banana leaves and steamed. A similar dessert is enjoyed throughout Southeast Asia, where it is known as khao tom mat in Thai, num ansom in Khmer, lepet in Indonesian, suman in Filipino, bánh tét and bánh chưng in Vietnamese, and khao tom in Lao.

Another sweet dish is binni chaler patishapta pitha, a rolled rice crepe made using coarsely ground, hydrated glutinous rice flour. The rice flour is spread in a thin circular layer over a hot pan and filled with a mixture of grated coconut, palm sugar, and occasionally milk powder, then rolled into shape.

A kind of rice porridge made from binni chal is known as modhu bhat, which literally means "honey rice". It is prepared by cooking binni chal in water for a prolonged period until soft, slightly blending it for a creamy consistency, and then topping it with shredded coconut. Sweeteners such as date palm sugar and honey are also added. Modhu bhat is a well-known traditional delicacy of the Chittagong area, often consumed during cooler months or as part of rural celebrations.

=== Cambodia ===
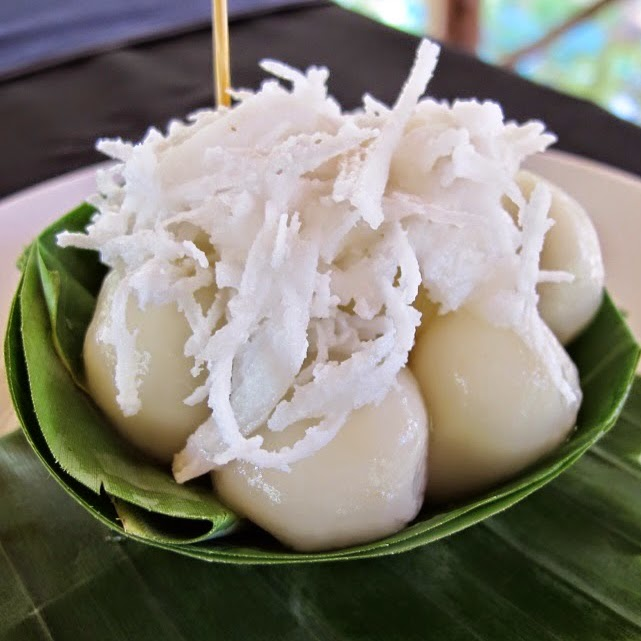
Num ple aiy, dumplings made from glutinous rice, palm sugar and coconut

Glutinous rice is known as bay damnaeb (Khmer: បាយដំណើប) in Khmer.

In Cambodian cuisine, glutinous rice is primarily used for desserts and is an essential ingredient for most sweet dishes, such as ansom chek, kralan, and num ple aiy.

=== China ===
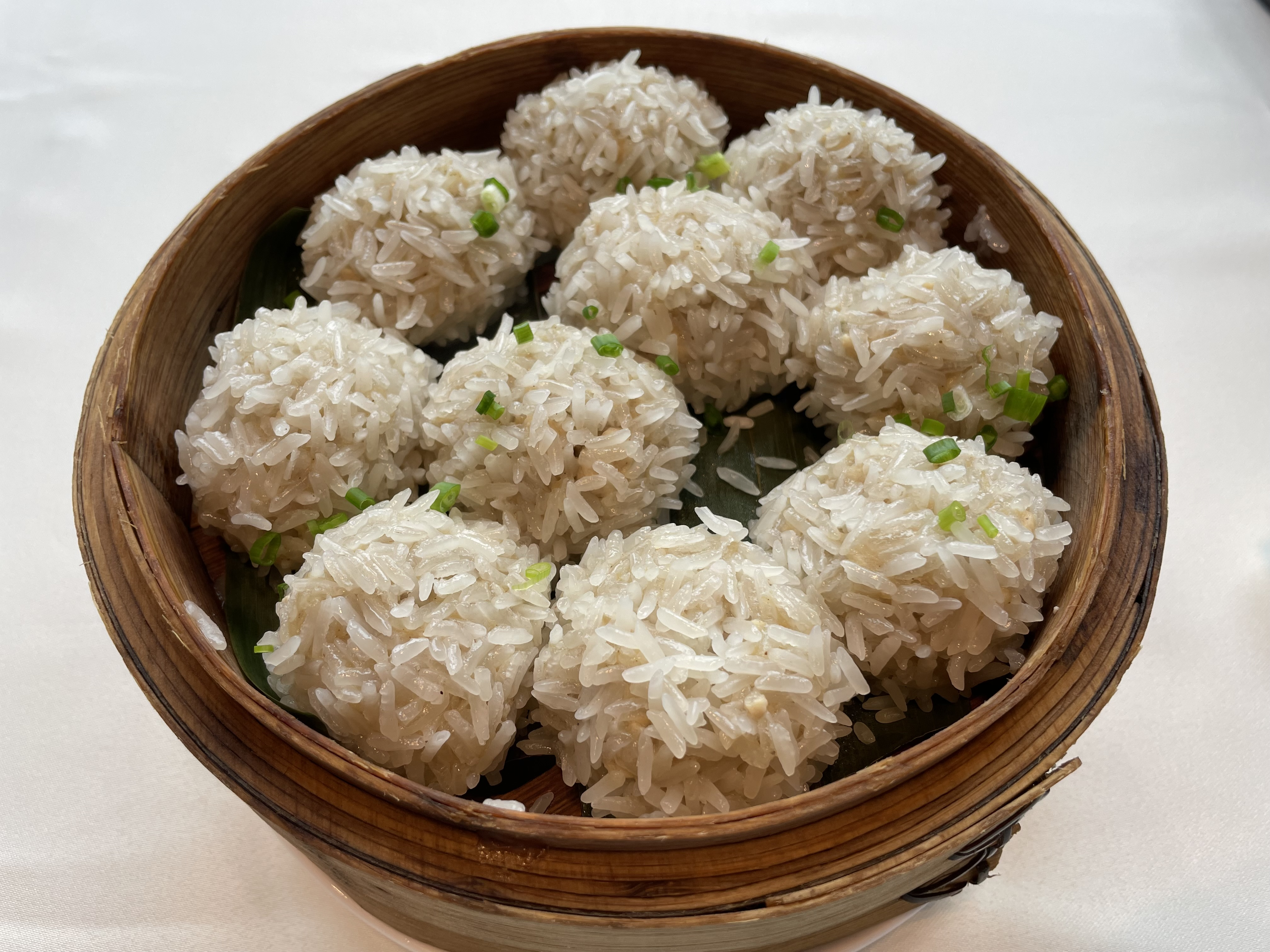
Pearl meatballs, a Chinese meatball coated in glutinous rice

In Chinese, glutinous rice is known as nuòmǐ (糯米) or chu̍t-bí (秫米) in Hokkien.

Glutinous rice is also often ground to make glutinous rice flour. This flour is made into niangao and sweet-filled dumplings called tangyuan, both of which are commonly eaten at Chinese New Year. It is also used as a thickener and for baking.

Glutinous rice or glutinous rice flour are both used in many Chinese bakery products and in many varieties of dim sum. They produce a flexible, resilient dough, which can take on the flavours of other ingredients added to it. Cooking usually consists of steaming or boiling, sometimes followed by pan-frying or deep-frying. Sweet glutinous rice is sometimes eaten with red bean paste.

Nuòmǐfàn (simplified Chinese: 糯米饭; traditional Chinese: 糯米飯) is steamed glutinous rice usually cooked with Chinese sausage, chopped mushrooms, chopped barbecued pork, and optionally dried shrimp or scallop, depending on the preference.

Zòngzi (simplified Chinese: 粽子; traditional Chinese: 糭子/糉子) is a dumpling consisting of glutinous rice and sweet or savoury fillings wrapped in large flat leaves (usually bamboo), which is then boiled or steamed. It is most eaten during the Dragon Boat Festival but may be eaten at any time of the year. It is well known as an easily transported snack, or a meal to consume while travelling. It is a common food among Chinese in Hong Kong, Singapore and Malaysia.

Zīfàn'gāo (simplified Chinese: 粢饭糕; traditional Chinese: 簢飯糕) is a well-known breakfast food originating in Eastern China consisting of cooked glutinous rice compressed into squares or rectangles, and then deep-fried. Additional seasoning and ingredients such as beans, zha cai, and sesame seeds may be added to the rice for added flavour. It has a similar appearance and external texture to hash browns.

Cífàntuán (simplified Chinese: 糍饭团; traditional Chinese: 糍飯糰) is another breakfast food consisting of a piece of youtiao tightly wrapped in cooked glutinous rice, sometimes with additional seasoning ingredients. Japanese onigiri resembles this Chinese food.

Lo mai gai (simplified Chinese: 糯米鸡; traditional Chinese: 糯米雞) is a dim sum dish, most often served in Hong Kong, Singapore, and Malaysia, consisting of steamed glutinous rice with chicken in a lotus-leaf wrap.

Bābǎofàn (simplified Chinese: 八宝饭; traditional Chinese: 八寶飯; lit. 'eight treasure rice') is a dessert made from glutinous rice, steamed and mixed with lard, sugar, and eight kinds of fruits or nuts.

A distinctive feature of the cuisine of the Hakka people of Southern China is its variety of steamed snack-type buns, dumplings, and patties made with a dough of coarsely ground rice, or ban , collectively known as "rice snacks". Some are filled with various salty or sweet ingredients.

Common examples of rice snacks made with ban from glutinous or sticky rice and non-glutinous rice include aiban (mugwort patty), caibao (yam bean bun), ziba (sticky rice balls) and bantiao (mianpaban or flat rice noodles).

Aiban encompasses several varieties of steamed patties and dumplings of various shapes and sizes, consisting of an outer layer made of glutinous ban dough filled with salty or sweet ingredients. It gets its name from the aromatic ai grass (mugwort), which, after being dried, powdered, and mixed with the ban, gives the dough a green colour and tea-like taste. Typical salty fillings include ground pork, mushrooms, and shredded white turnips. The most common sweet filling is made with red beans.

Caibao is a generic term for all types of steamed buns with various sorts of filling. Hakka-style caibao are distinctive in that the enclosing skin is made with glutinous rice dough in place of wheat flour dough. Besides ground pork, mushrooms, and shredded turnips, fillings may include ingredients such as dried shrimp and dry fried-shallot flakes.

Ziba is glutinous rice dough that, after steaming in a large container, is mashed into a sticky, putty-like mass from which small patties are formed. After that, it is left to dry. When ready to eat, it is commonly fried, boiled or grilled. Then, it is usually coated with a layer of Chinese brown sugar syrup with sugary peanut or soybean powder. It has no filling.

Chinese glutinous rice dishes

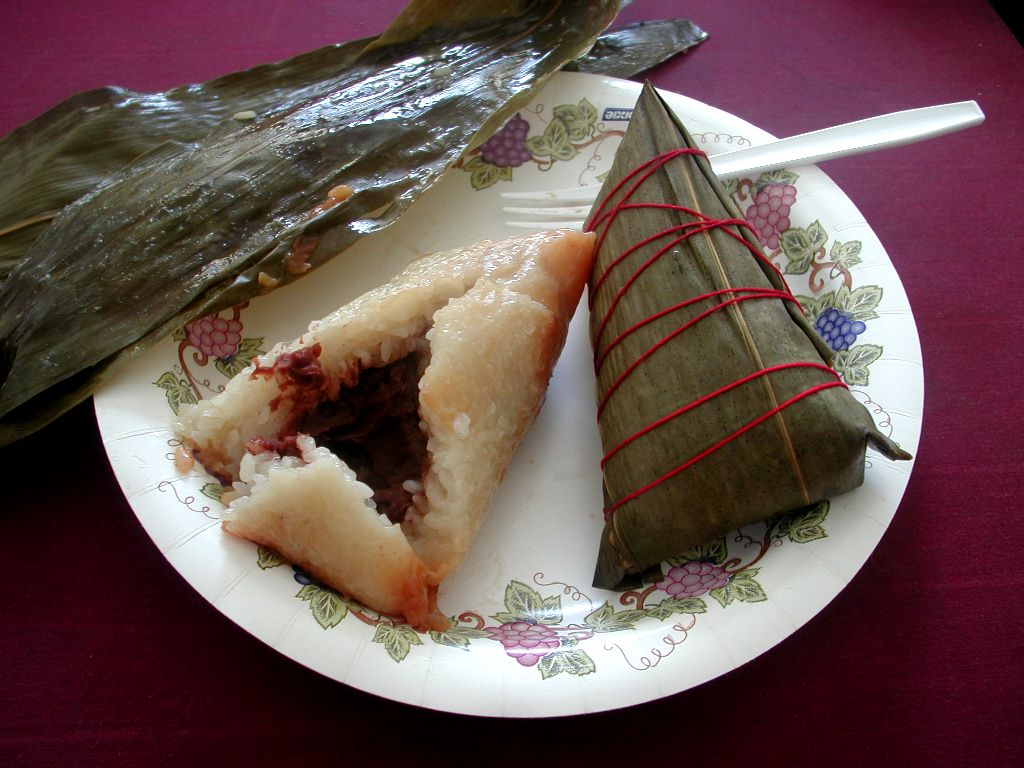
Zongzi rice dumplings, without and with bamboo leaf wrapping

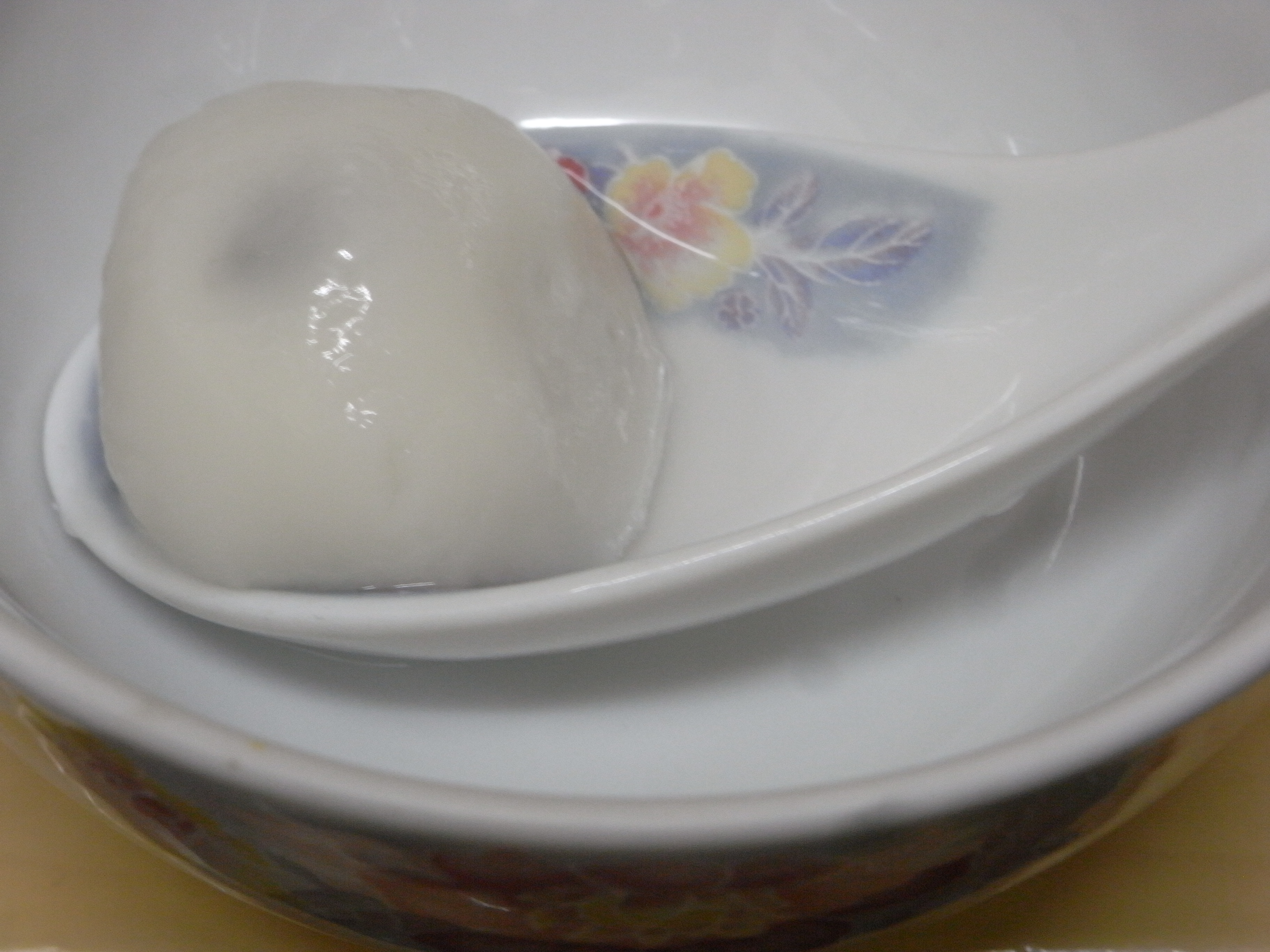
Glutinous rice ball dessert, filled with sesame paste

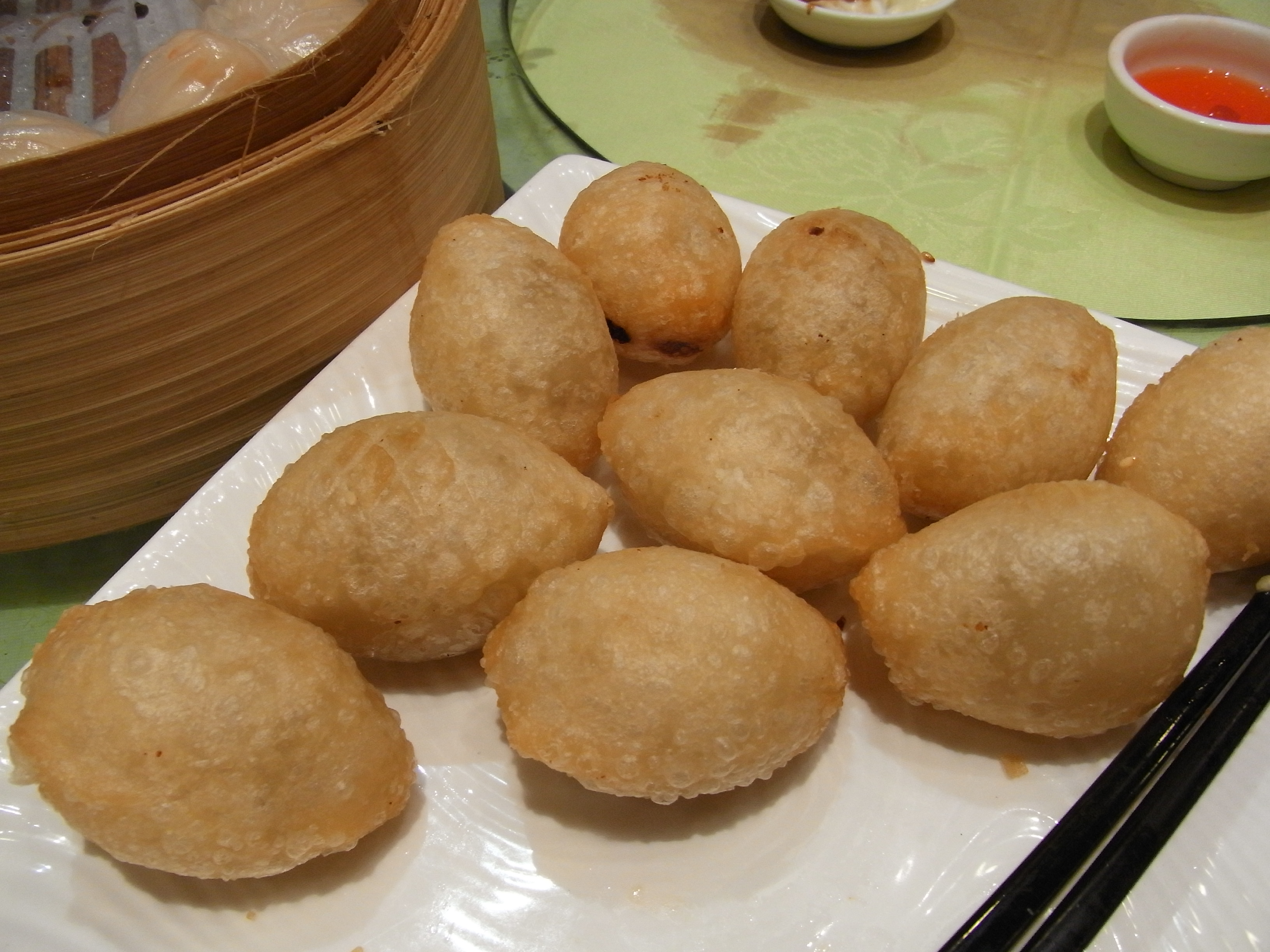
Deep-fried glutinous rice ball dumplings

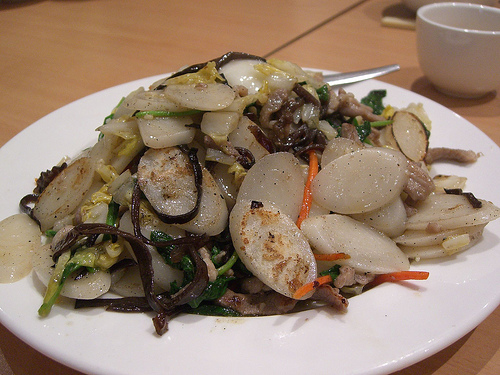
Fried slices of Shanghai nian cake

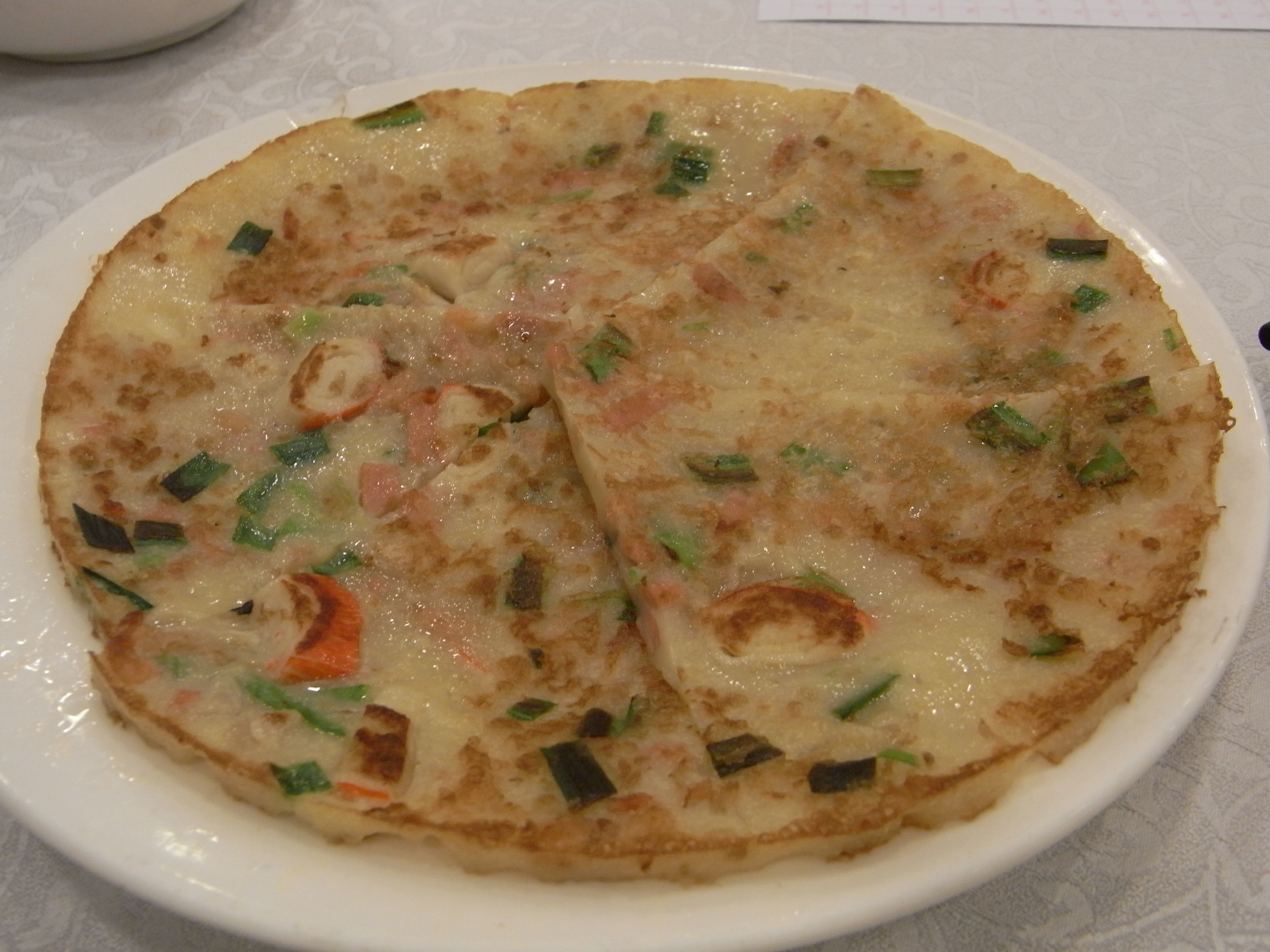
Chinese glutinous rice pancake or "Chinese pizza"

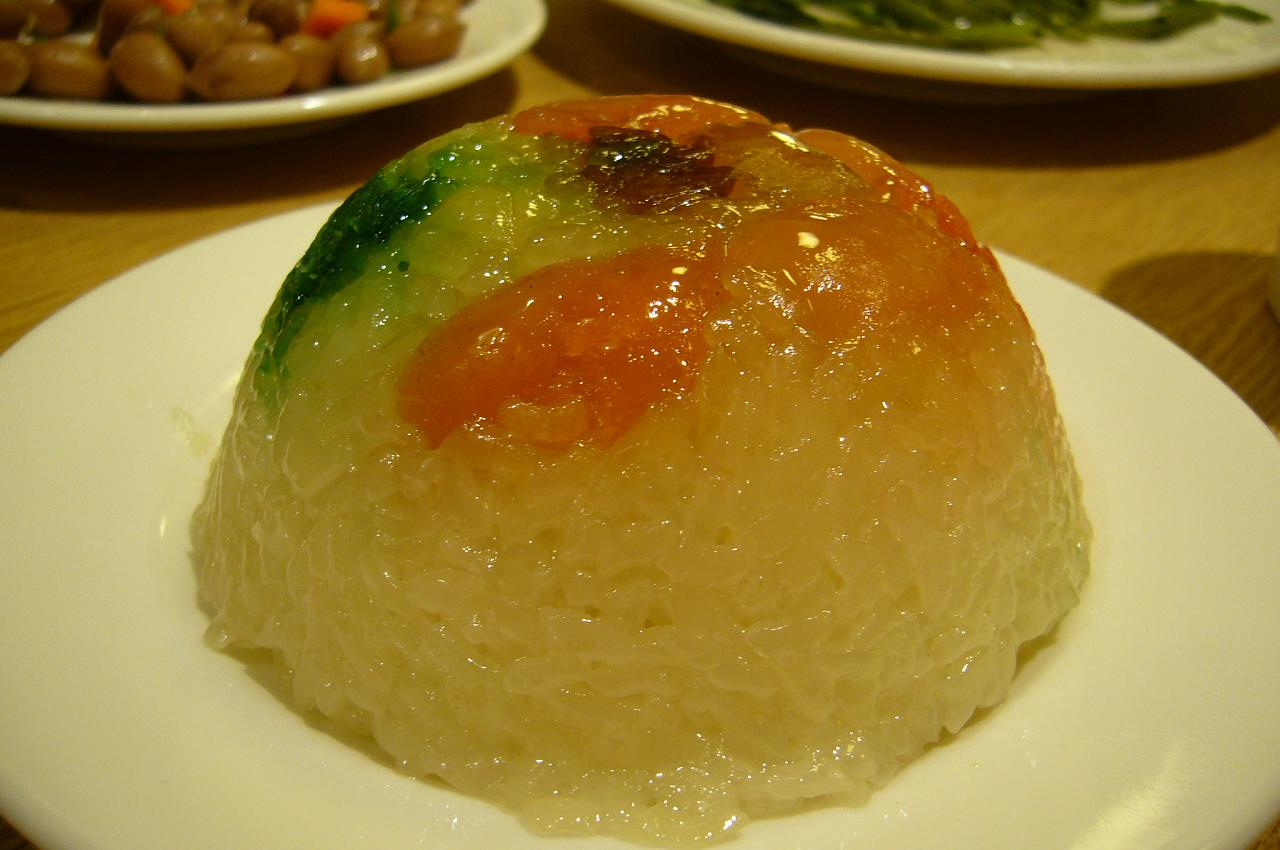
Ba bao fan

=== Indonesia ===
Glutinous rice is known as beras ketan or simply ketan in Java and most of Indonesia, and pulut in Sumatra. It is widely used as an ingredient for a wide variety of sweet, savoury, or fermented snacks. Glutinous rice is used as either hulled grains or milled into flour. It is usually mixed with santan, meaning coconut milk in Indonesian, along with a bit of salt to add some taste. Glutinous rice is rarely eaten as a staple. One example is lemang, which is glutinous rice and coconut milk cooked in bamboo stems lined by banana leaves. Glutinous rice is also sometimes used in a mix with normal rice in rice dishes such as nasi tumpeng or nasi tim. It is widely used during the Lebaran seasons as traditional food. It is also used in the production of alcoholic beverages such as tuak and brem bali.

==== Savoury snacks ====
- Ketan – traditionally refers to the glutinous rice itself as well as sticky rice delicacy in its simplest form. The handful mounds of glutinous rice are rounded and sprinkled with grated coconut, either fresh or sautéed as serundeng.
- Ketupat – square-shaped crafts made from the same local leaves as palas, but it is usually filled with regular rice grains instead of pulut, though it depends on the maker
- Gandos – a snack made from ground glutinous rice mixed with grated coconut, and fried
- Lemang – wrapped in banana leaves and stuffed inside a stalk of bamboo, and left to be barbecued or grilled on an open fire to make the taste and texture tender and unique
- Lemper – cooked glutinous rice with shredded meat inside and wrapped in banana leaves, common in Java
- Nasi kuning – either common rice or glutinous rice can be made into ketan kuning, yellow rice coloured with turmeric
- Songkolo or sokko – steamed black glutinous rice served with serundeng, anchovies, and sambal. It was very common in Makassar.
- Tumpeng – glutinous rice can be made into tumpeng nasi kuning, yellow rice coloured by turmeric and shaped into a cone.

==== Sweet snacks ====
- Variety of kue – glutinous rice flour is also used in certain traditional local desserts, known as kue, such as kue lapis.
- Bubur ketan hitam – black glutinous rice porridge with coconut milk and palm sugar syrup
- Cendil – glutinous rice flour cake with sugar and grated coconut
- Dodol – traditional sweets made of glutinous rice flour and coconut sugar. Similar variants include wajik (or wajit).
- Gemblong – white glutinous rice flour balls smeared with palm sugar caramel. In East Java, it was known as getas, except it uses black glutinous rice flour as the main ingredient.
- Jipang – popped glutinous rice held together by caramelized sugar
- Klepon – glutinous rice flour balls filled with palm sugar and coated with grated coconut
- Lupis – glutinous rice wrapped in individual triangles using banana leaves and left to boil for a few hours. The rice pieces are then tossed with grated coconut all over and served with palm sugar syrup.
- Onde-onde – glutinous rice flour balls filled with sweetened mung bean paste and coated with sesame similar to Jin deui
- Wingko babat – baked glutinous rice flour with coconut

==== Fermented snacks ====
- Brem – solid cake from the dehydrated juice of pressed fermented glutinous rice
- Tapai ketan – cooked glutinous rice fermented with yeast, wrapped in banana or roseapple leaves. Usually eaten as it is or in a mixed cold dessert

==== Crackers ====
- Rengginang – traditional rice crackers related to kerupuk

In addition, glutinous rice dishes adapted from other cultures are just as easily available. Examples include kue moci (mochi, Japanese) and bacang (zongzi, Chinese).

Indonesian glutinous rice dishes

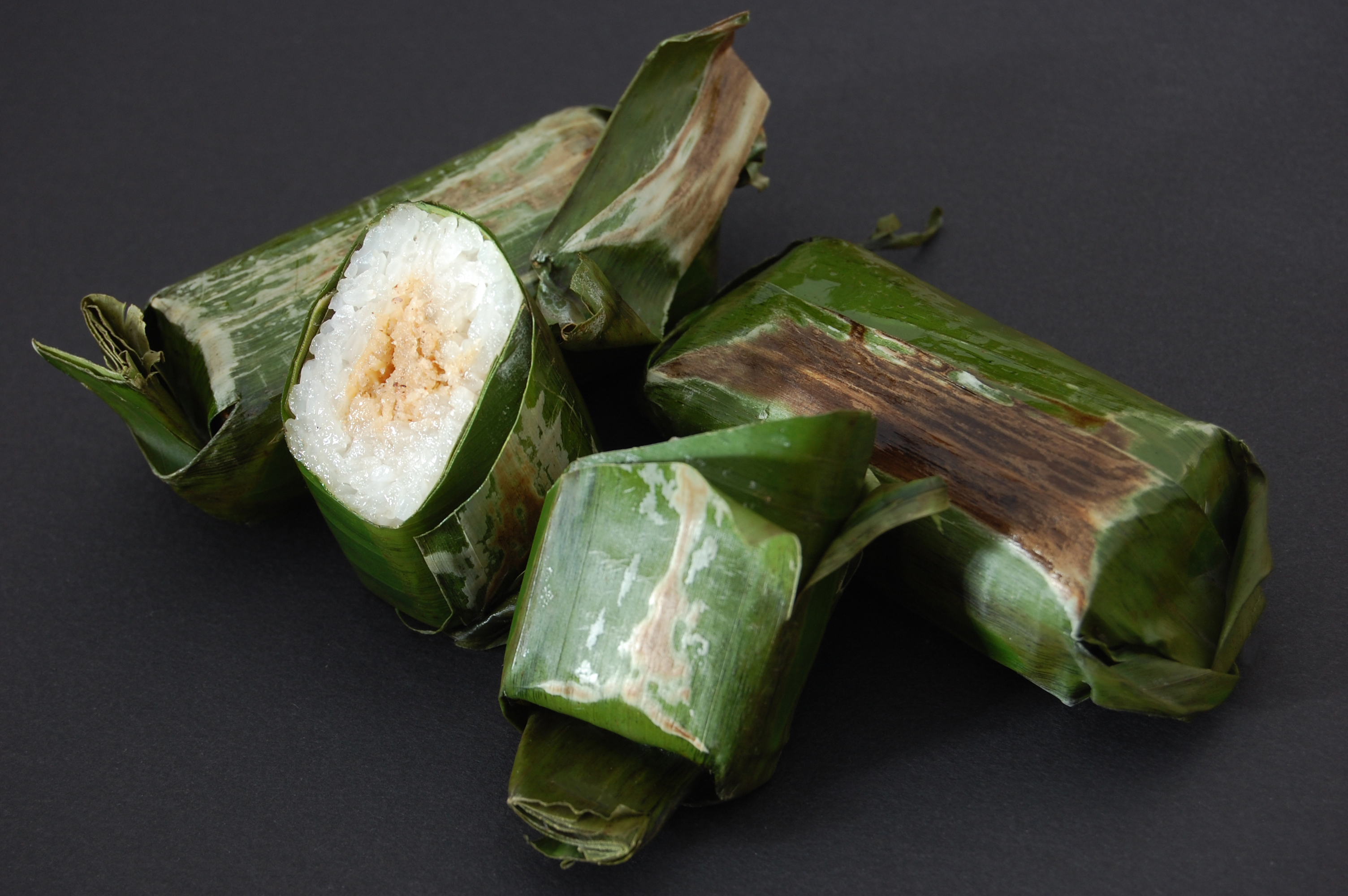
Lemper, glutinous rice filled with chicken wrapped in banana leaves

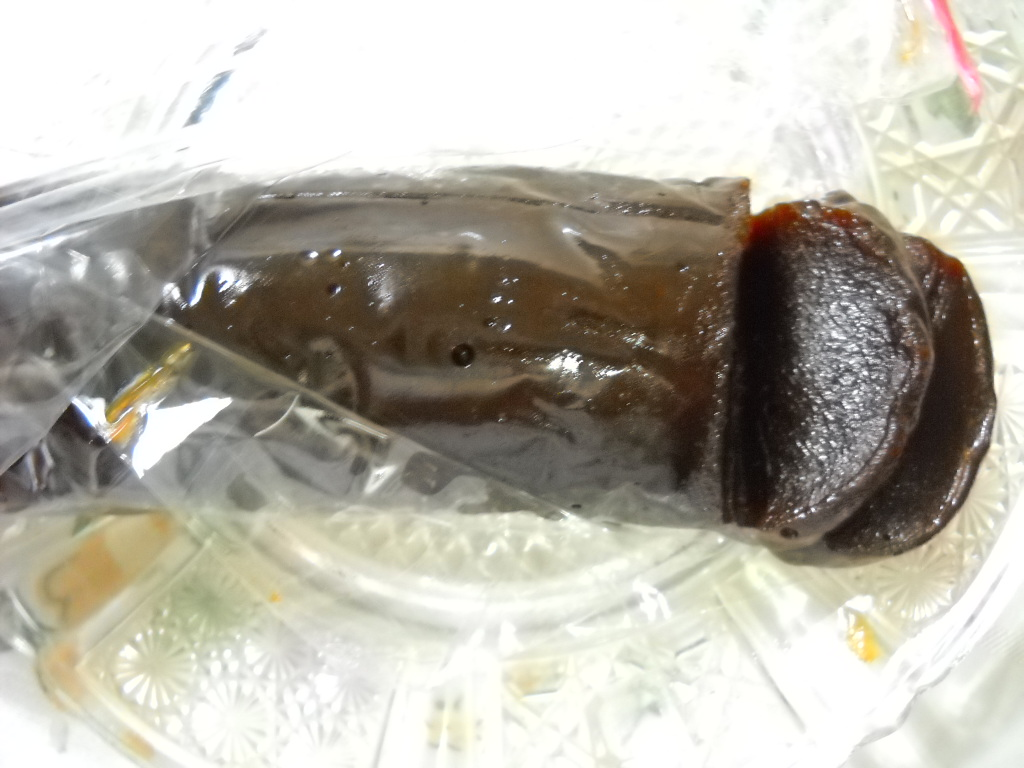
Dodol made from coconut sugar and ground glutinous rice

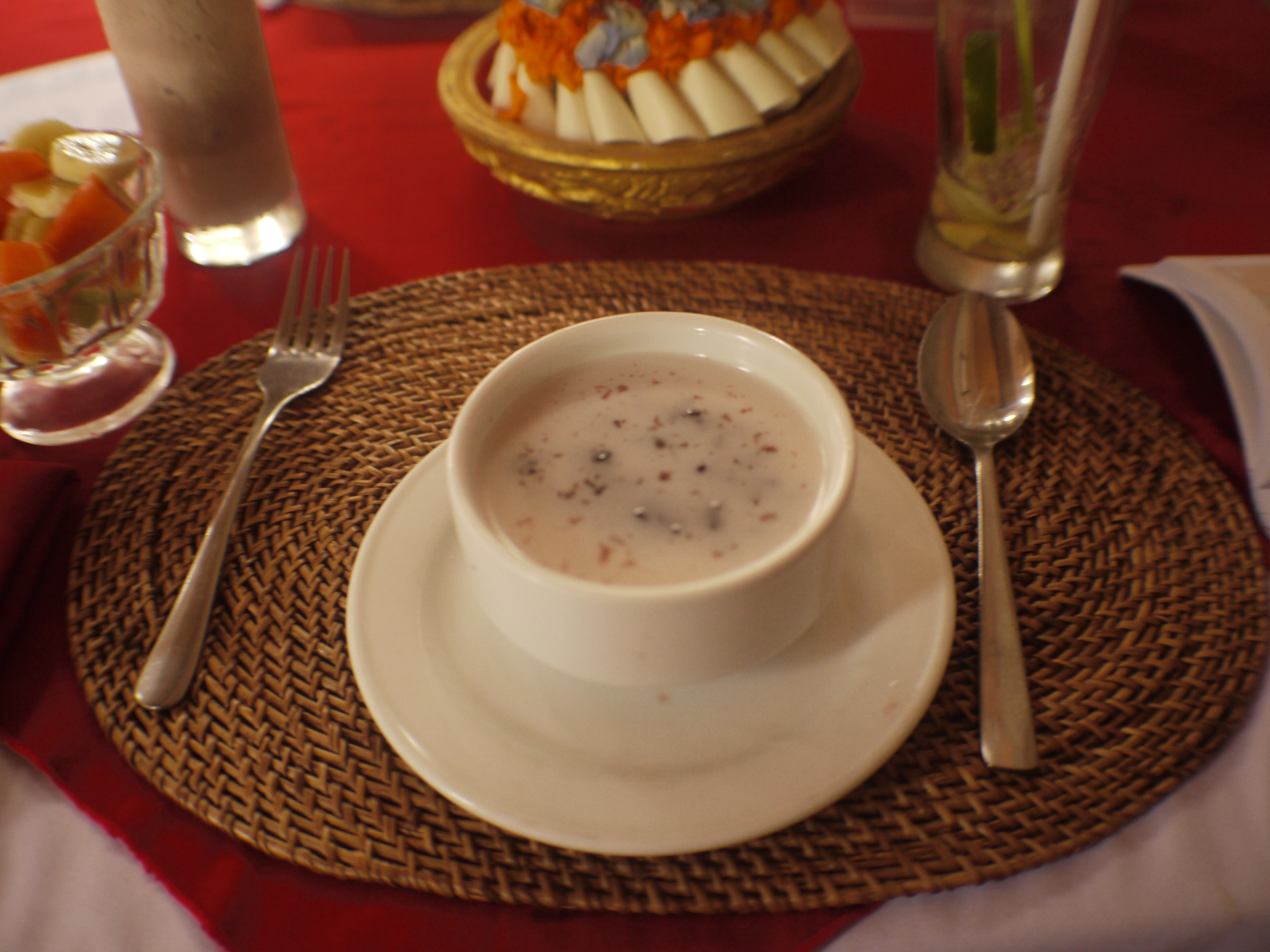
Bubur ketan hitam, black glutinous rice porridge with coconut milk and palm sugar

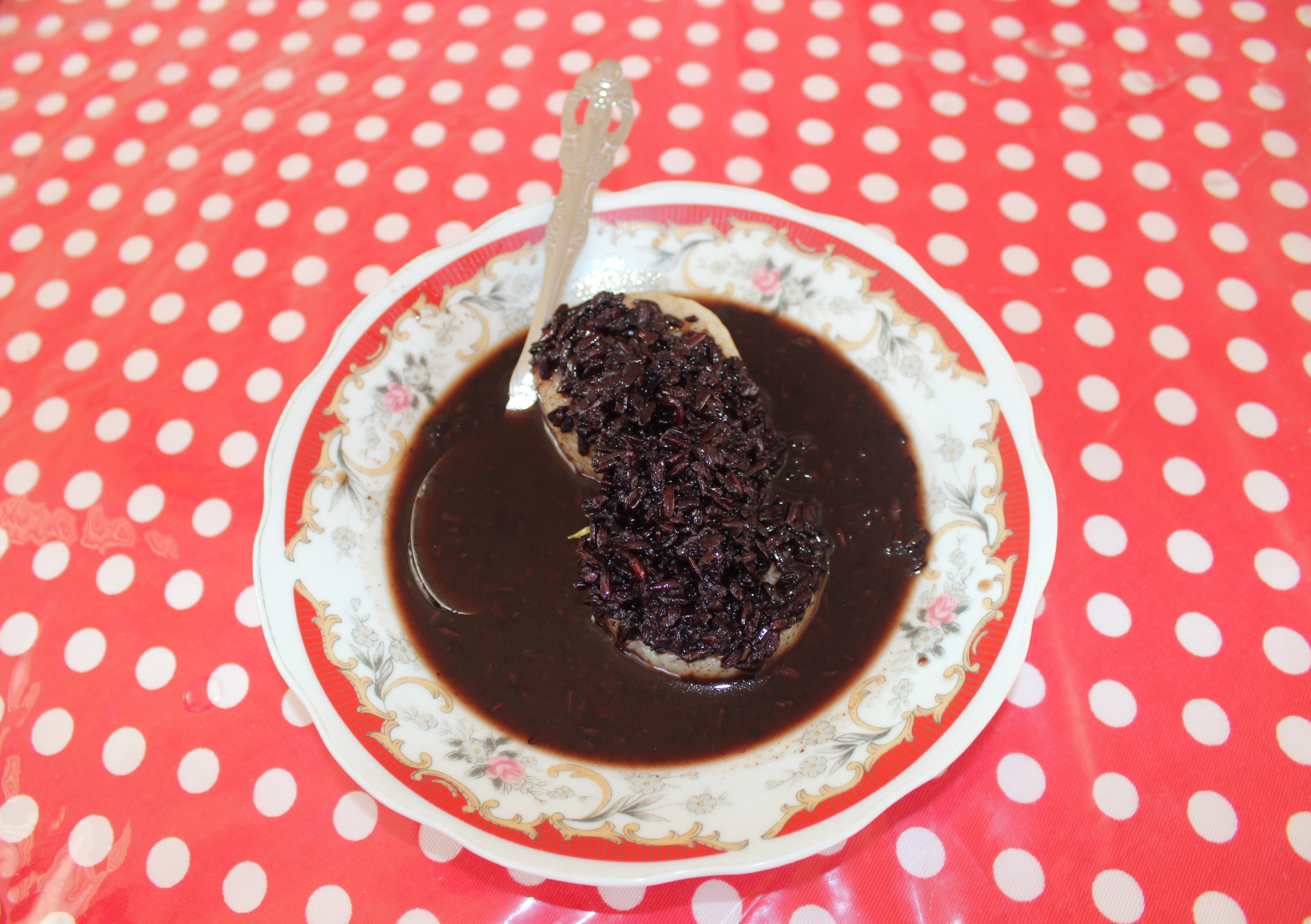
Lemang topped with fermented tapai made of black glutinous rice

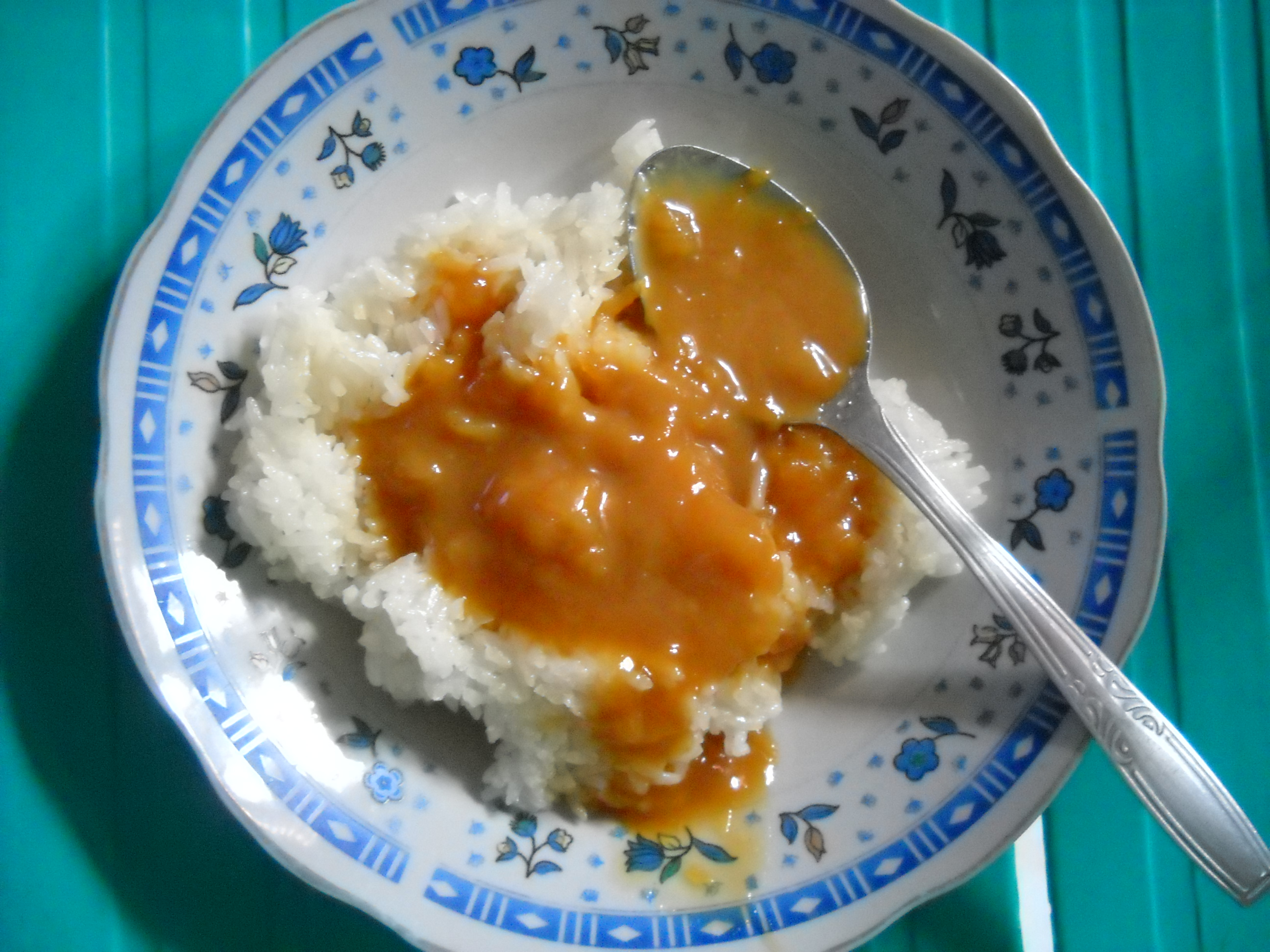
Ketan served with durian sauce

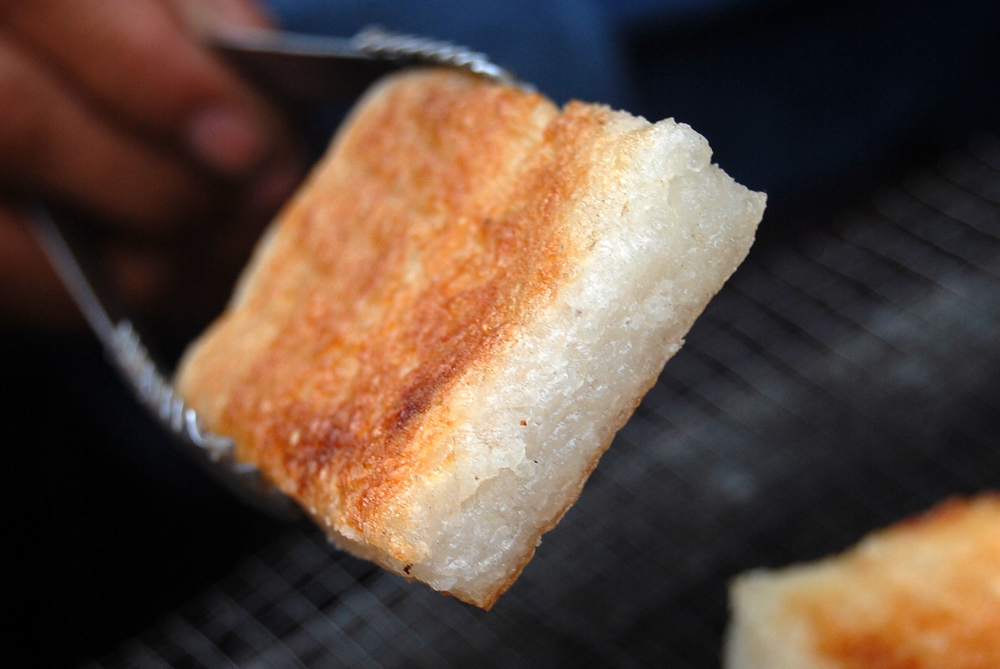
Uli bakar or grilled glutinous rice cube

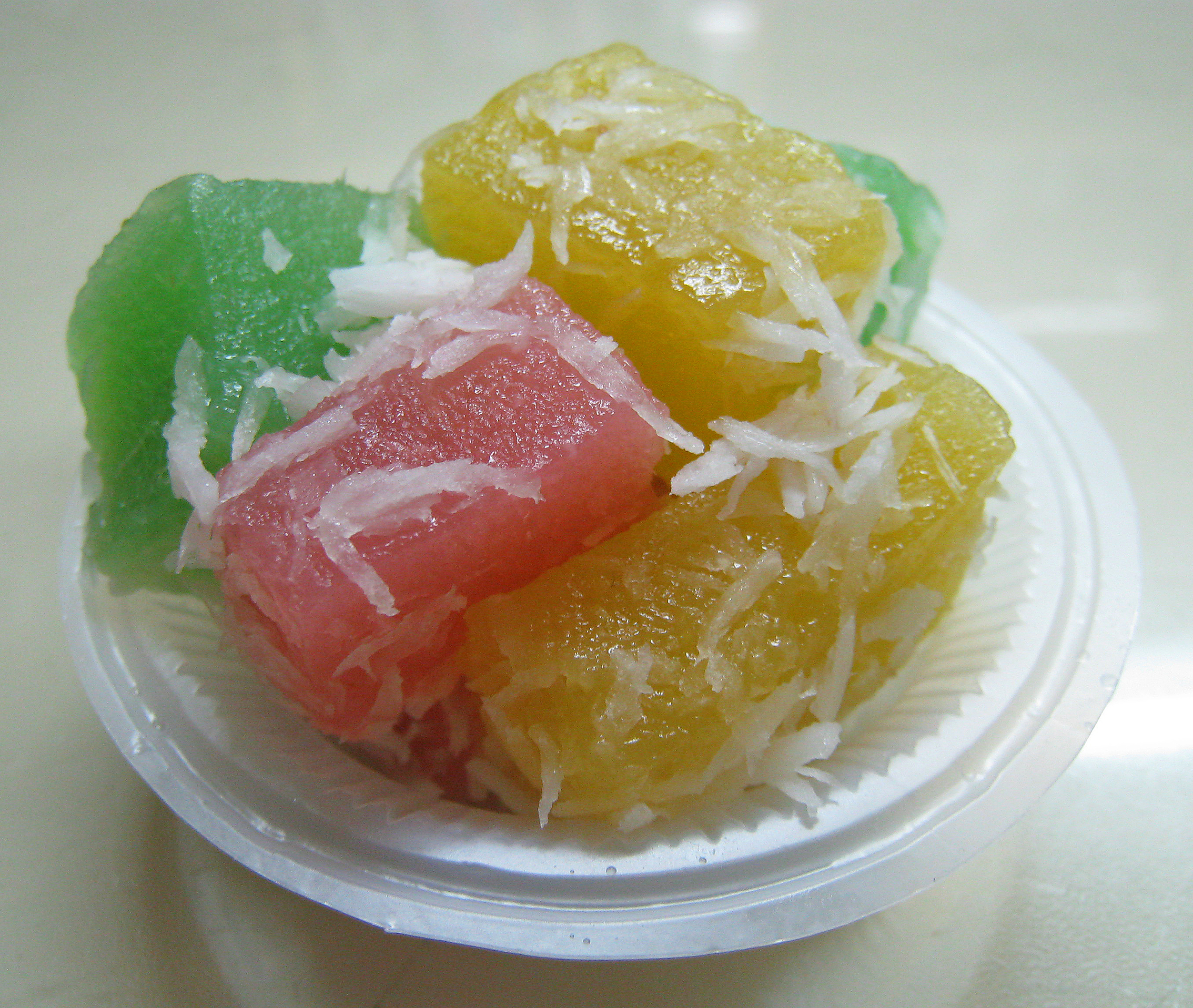
Cendil a Javanese cake made of glutinous rice flour, sugar, and grated coconut

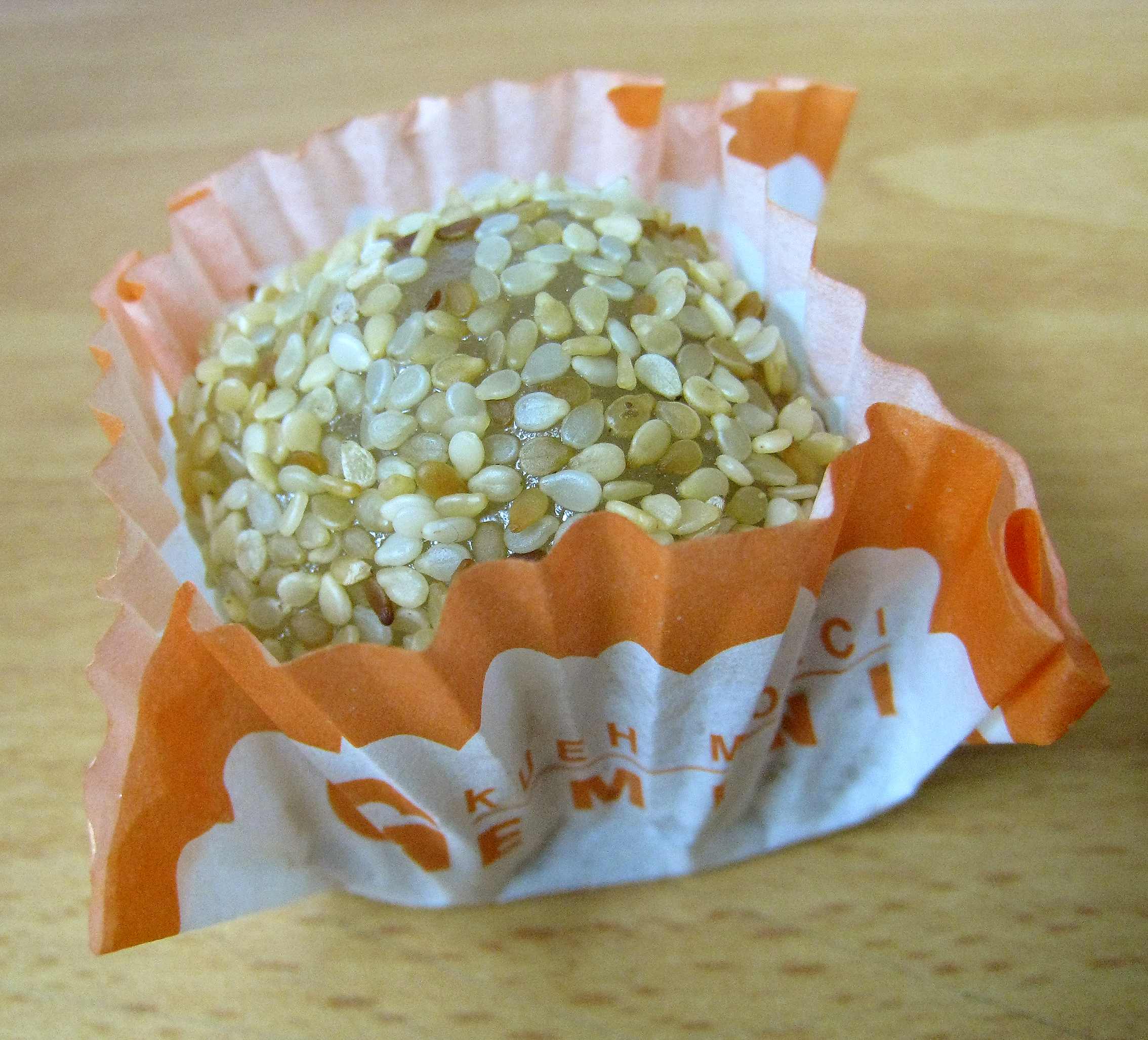
Kue mochi derived from Chinese-Japanese mochi, made from glutinous rice flour

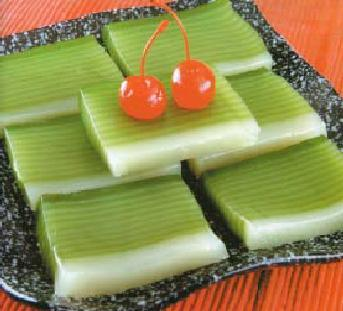
Kue lapis - Indonesian cake made mainly of glutinous rice

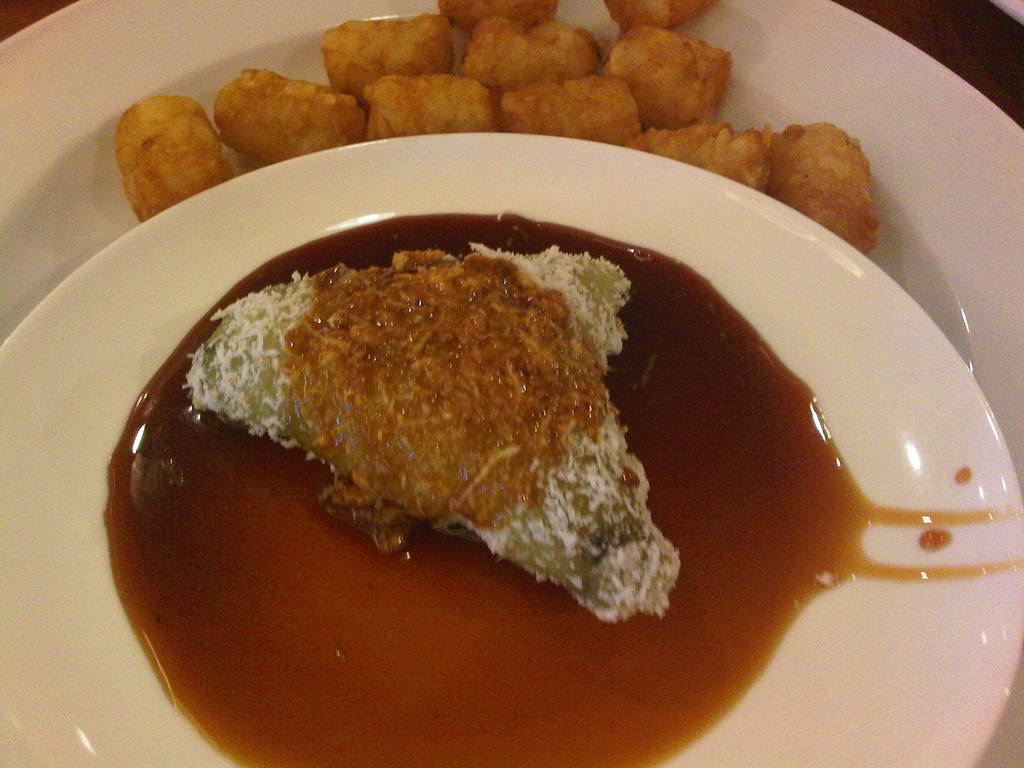
Kue lupis - Glutinous rice cake with grated coconut and liquid palm sugar

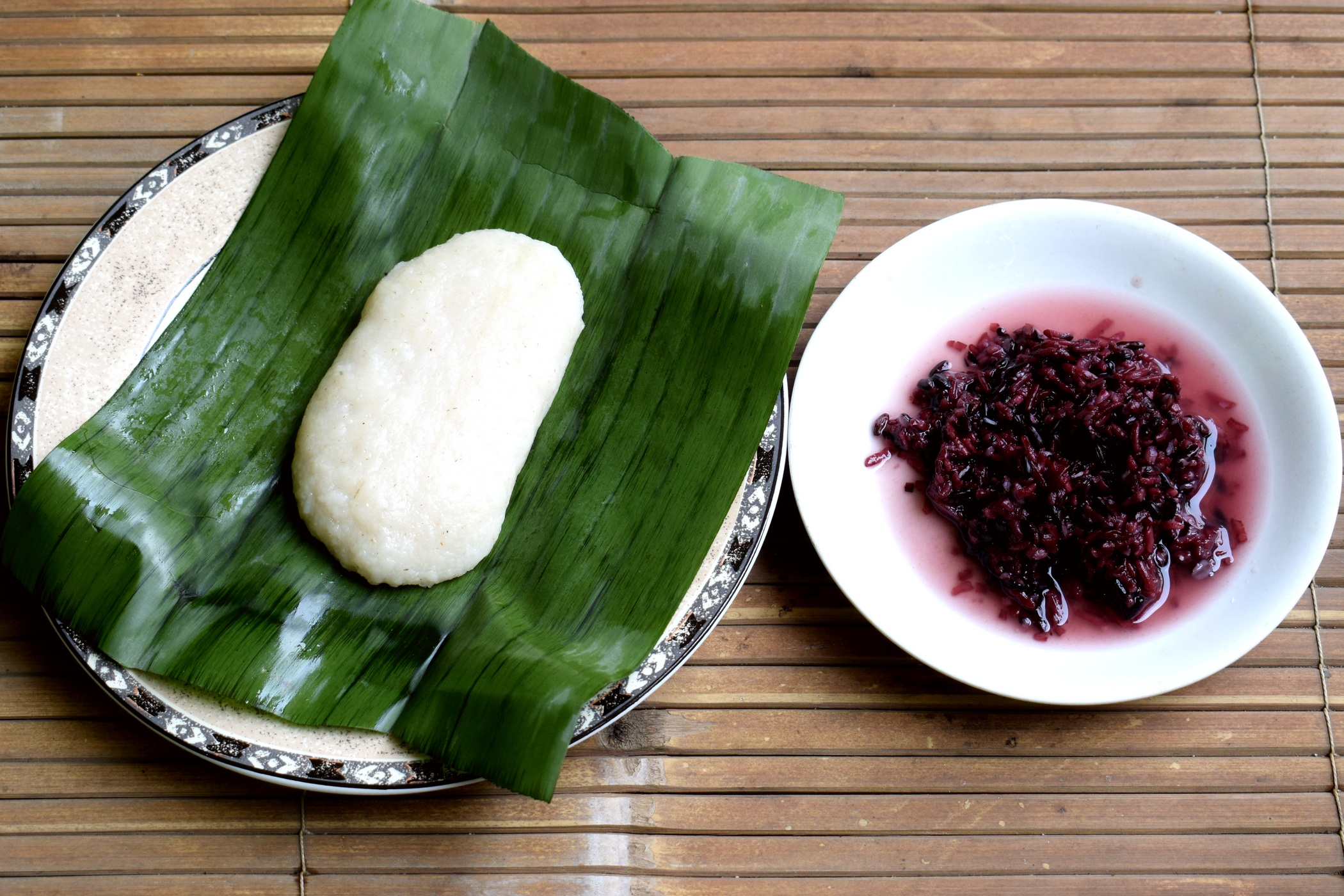
Tapai ketan (right) served with uli (glutinous rice cooked with grated coconut, and mashed; left)

=== Japan ===
Japanese glutinous rice dishes

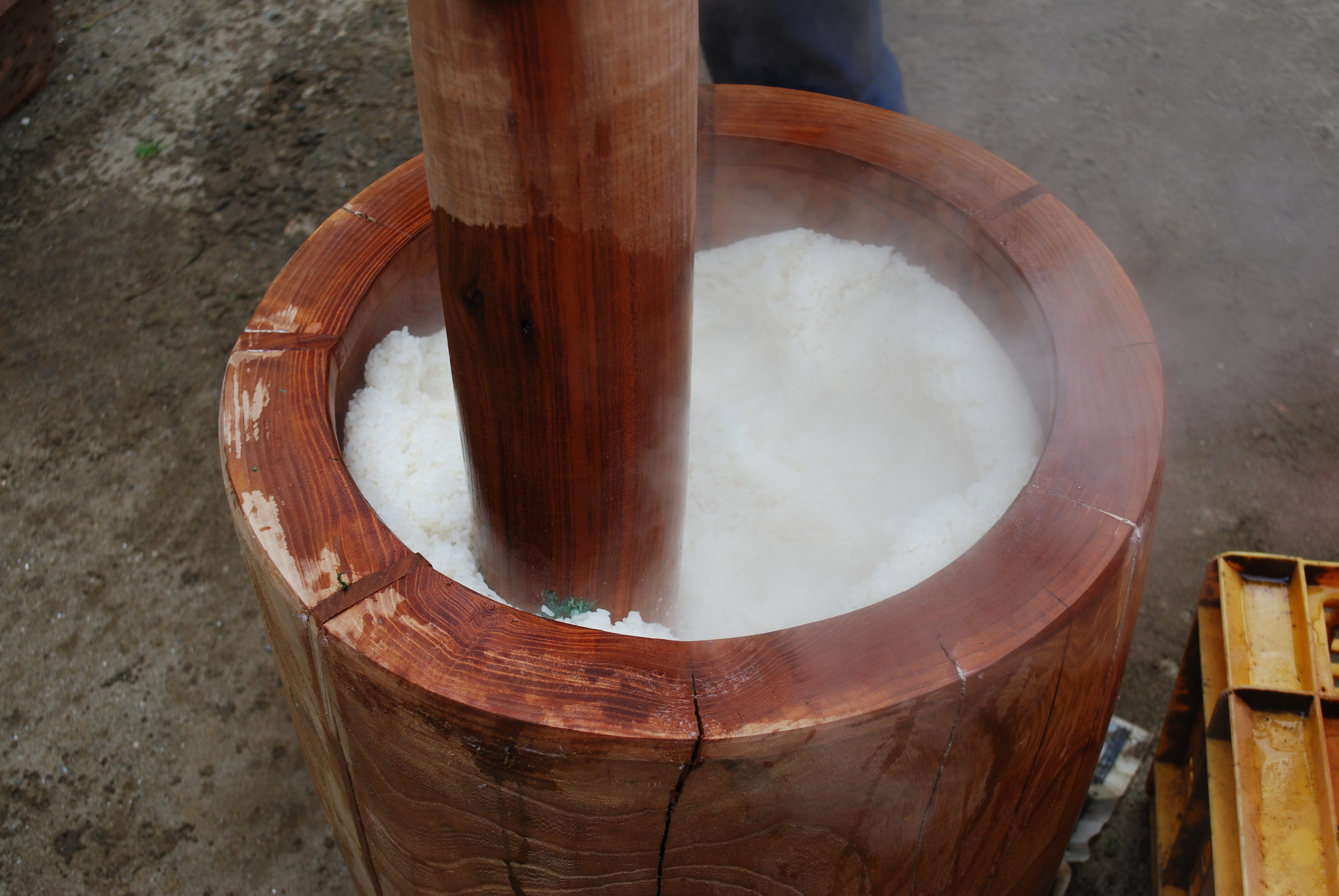
Preparation of mochi in Japan

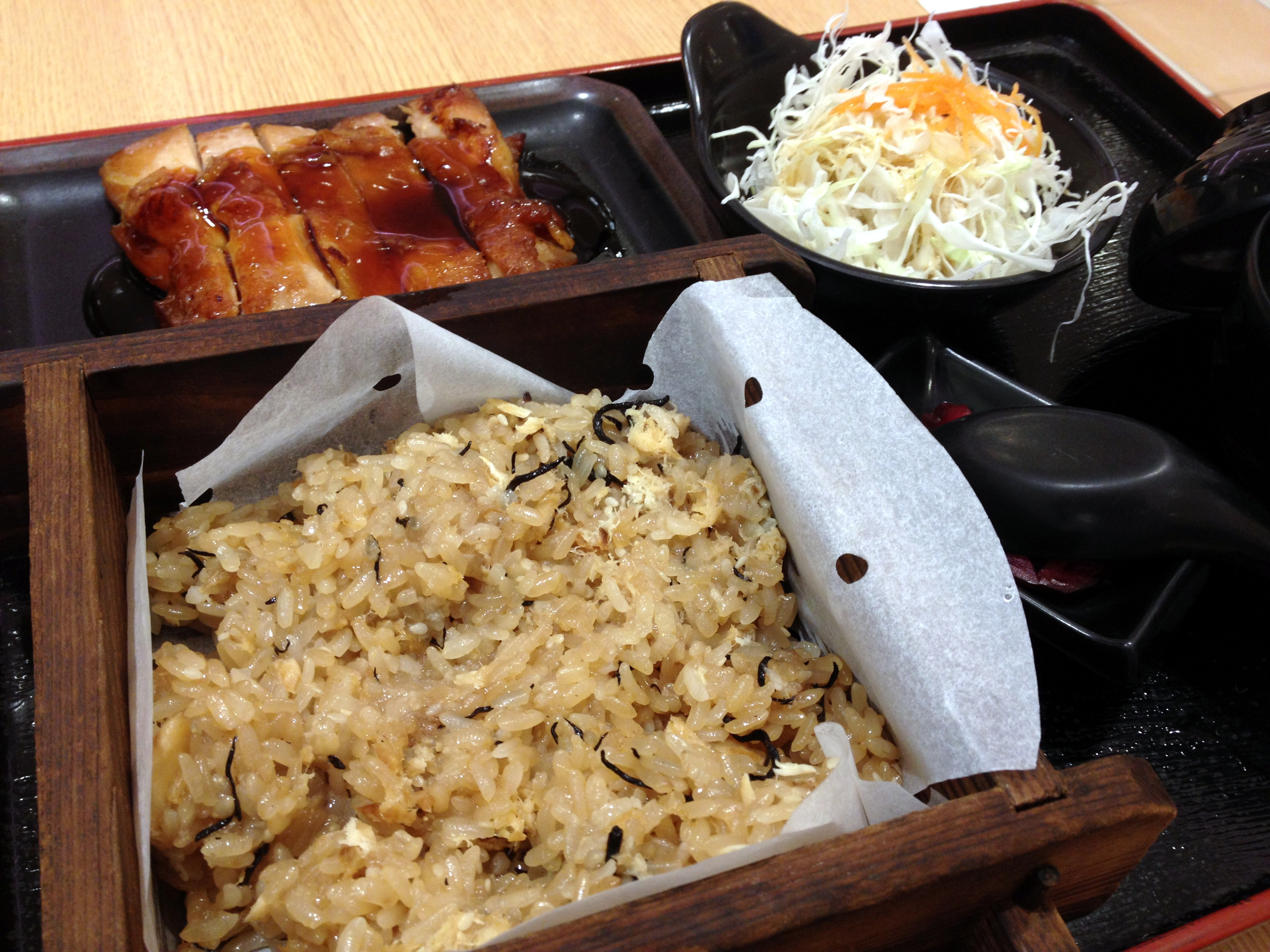
Okowa (おこわ), sticky glutinous rice mixed with all kinds of vegetables or meat and steamed

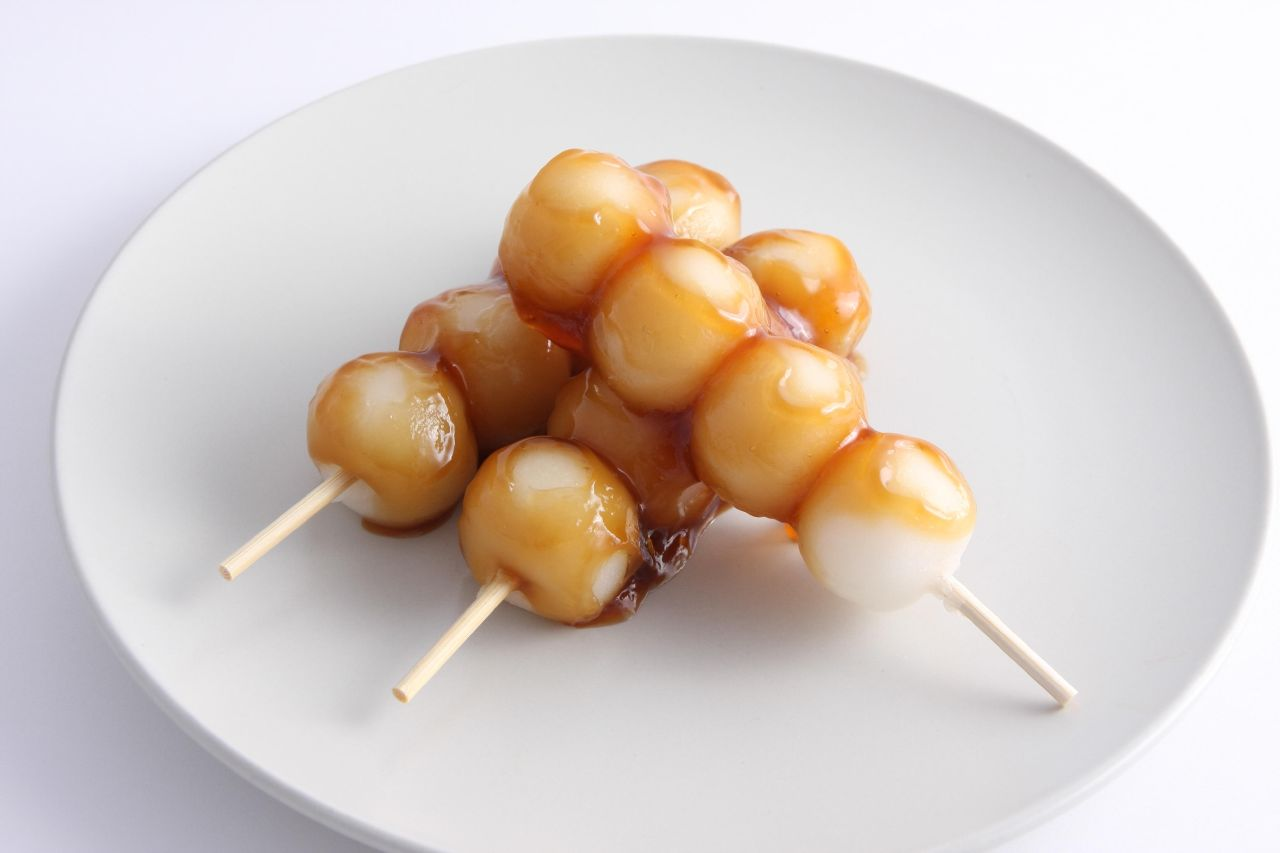
Dango, a common wagashi served with soy sauce

In Japan, glutinous rice is known as mochigome (Japanese: もち米). It is used in traditional dishes such as sekihan also known as Red bean rice, okowa, and ohagi. It may also be ground into mochiko (もち粉), a rice flour, used to make mochi (もち), a kind of sweet rice cake. Mochi is traditionally prepared for the Japanese New Year, but can also be eaten year-round. Many different types of mochi exist from different regions, and they are normally flavoured with traditional ingredients such as red beans, water chestnuts, green tea, and pickled cherry flowers. See also Japanese rice.

=== Korea ===
In Korea, glutinous rice is called chapssal (Korean: 찹쌀), and its characteristic stickiness is called chalgi (찰기). Cooked rice made of glutinous rice is called chalbap (찰밥) and rice cakes (떡; ddeok) are called chalddeok or chapssalddeok (찰떡; 찹쌀떡). Chalbap is used as stuffing in samgyetang (삼계탕).

Glutinous rice is the main ingredient of gochujang, which is frequently used in Korean cuisine.

=== Laos ===
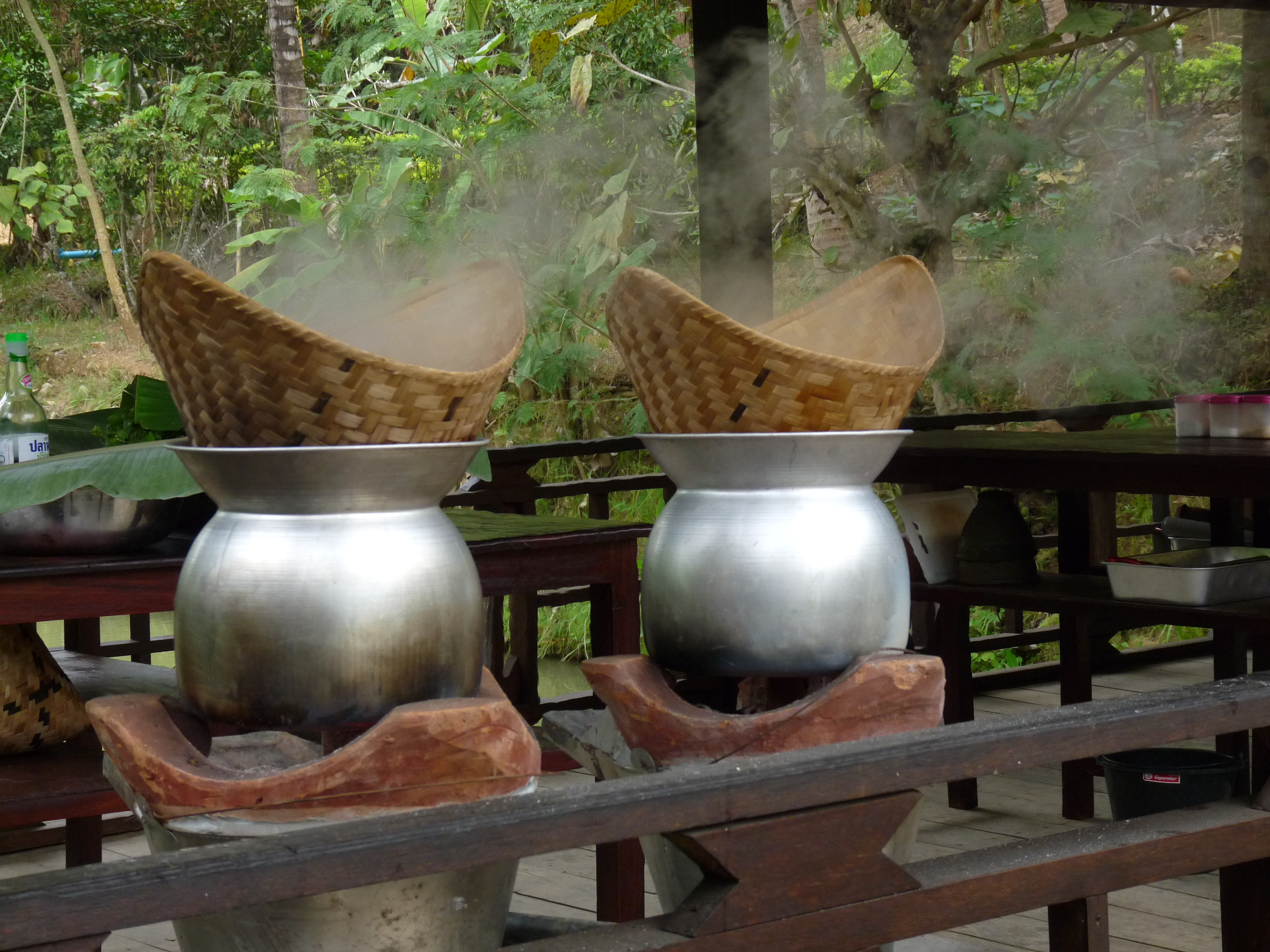
Steaming sticky rice in traditional baskets or houat

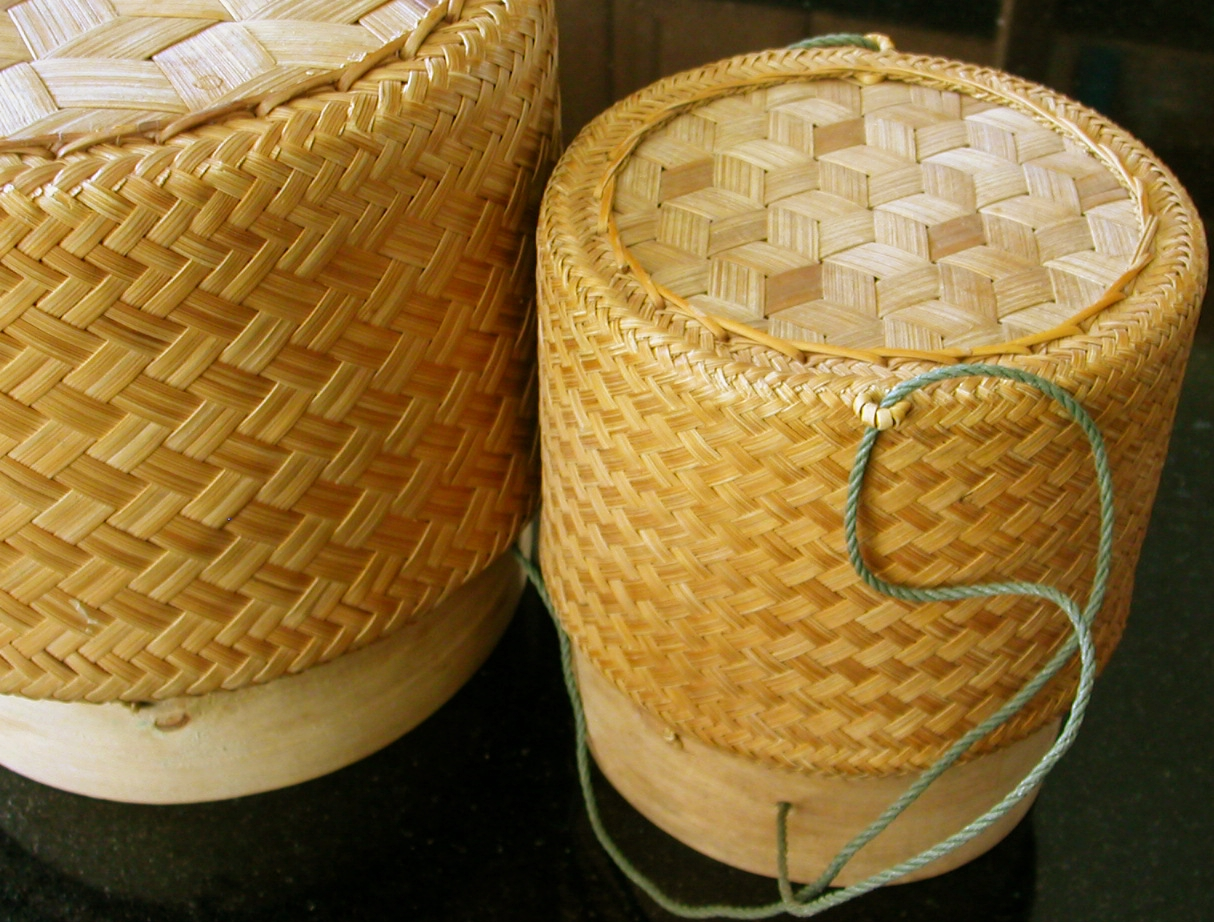
A Lao rice basket or thip khao

Along the Greater Mekong Sub-region, the Lao have been cultivating glutinous rice for approximately 4000 – 6000 years. Glutinous rice is the national dish of Laos. In Laos, a tiny landlocked nation with a population of approximately 7 million, per-capita sticky rice consumption is the highest on earth at 171 kg or 377 pounds per year. Sticky rice is deeply ingrained in the culture, religious tradition, and national identity of Laos (see Lao cuisine). Sticky rice is considered the essence of what it means to be Lao. It has been said that no matter where they are in the world, sticky rice will always be the glue that holds the Lao communities together, connecting them to their culture and to Laos. Lao people often identify themselves as the "children of sticky rice" and if they did not eat sticky rice, they would not be Lao.

Sticky rice is known as khao niao (Lao:ເຂົ້າໜຽວ): khao means rice, and niao means sticky. It is cooked by soaking for several hours and then steaming in a bamboo basket or houat (Lao: ຫວດ). After that, it should be turned out on a clean surface and kneaded with a wooden paddle to release the steam; this results in rice balls that will stick to themselves but not to fingers. The large rice ball is kept in a small basket made of bamboo or thip khao (Lao:ຕິບເຂົ້າ). The rice is sticky but dry, rather than wet and gummy-like non-glutinous varieties. Laotians consume glutinous rice as part of their main diet; they also use toasted glutinous rice khao khoua (Lao:ເຂົ້າຄົ່ວ) to add a nut-like flavour to many dishes. A popular Lao meal is a combination of larb (Lao:ລາບ), Lao grilled chicken ping gai (Lao:ປີ້ງໄກ່), spicy green papaya salad dish known as tam mak hoong (Lao:ຕຳໝາກຫູ່ງ), and sticky rice (khao niao).

- Khao lam (Lao:ເຂົ້າຫລາມ): sticky rice is mixed with coconut milk, red or black bean, or taro, and is filled in a bamboo tube. The tube is roasted until all the ingredients are cooked and blended together to give a sweet aromatic treat. Khao Lam is such a popular food for Laotians and is sold on the streets.
- Nam Khao (Lao:ແໝມເຂົ້າ): sticky rice has also been used for preparing a popular dish from Laos called Nam Khao (or Laotian crispy rice salad). It is made with a deep-fried mixture of sticky rice and jasmine rice balls, chunks of Lao-style fermented pork sausage called som moo, chopped peanuts, grated coconut, sliced scallions or shallots, mint, cilantro, lime juice, fish sauce, and other ingredients.
- Khao Khua (Lao:ເຂົ້າຂົ້ວ): sticky rice are toasted and crushed. Khao Khua is a necessary ingredient for preparing a national Laotian dish called Larb (Lao:ລາບ) and Nam Tok (Lao:ນ້ຳຕົກ) that are popular for ethnic Lao people living in both Laos and in the Northeastern region of Thailand called Isan.
- Khao tom (Lao:ເຂົ້າຕົ້ມ): a steamed mixture of khao niao with sliced fruits and coconut milk wrapped in banana leaf.
- Khao jee: Lao sticky rice pancakes with egg coating, an ancient Laotian cooking method of grilling glutinous rice or sticky rice over an open fire.
- Sai Krok (Lao:ໄສ້ກອກ): Lao sausage made from coarsely chopped fatty pork seasoned with lemongrass, galangal, kaffir lime leaves, shallots, cilantro, chillies, garlic, salt, and sticky rice.
- Or lam (Lao:ເອາະຫຼາມ): a mildly spicy and tongue-numbing stew originating from Luang Prabang, Laos.
- Lao-Lao (Lao:ເຫລົ້າລາວ): Laotian rice whisky produced in Laos.

Khao niao is also used as an ingredient in desserts. Khao niao mixed with coconut milk can be served with ripened mango or durian.

=== Malaysia ===
Malaysian glutinous rice dishes

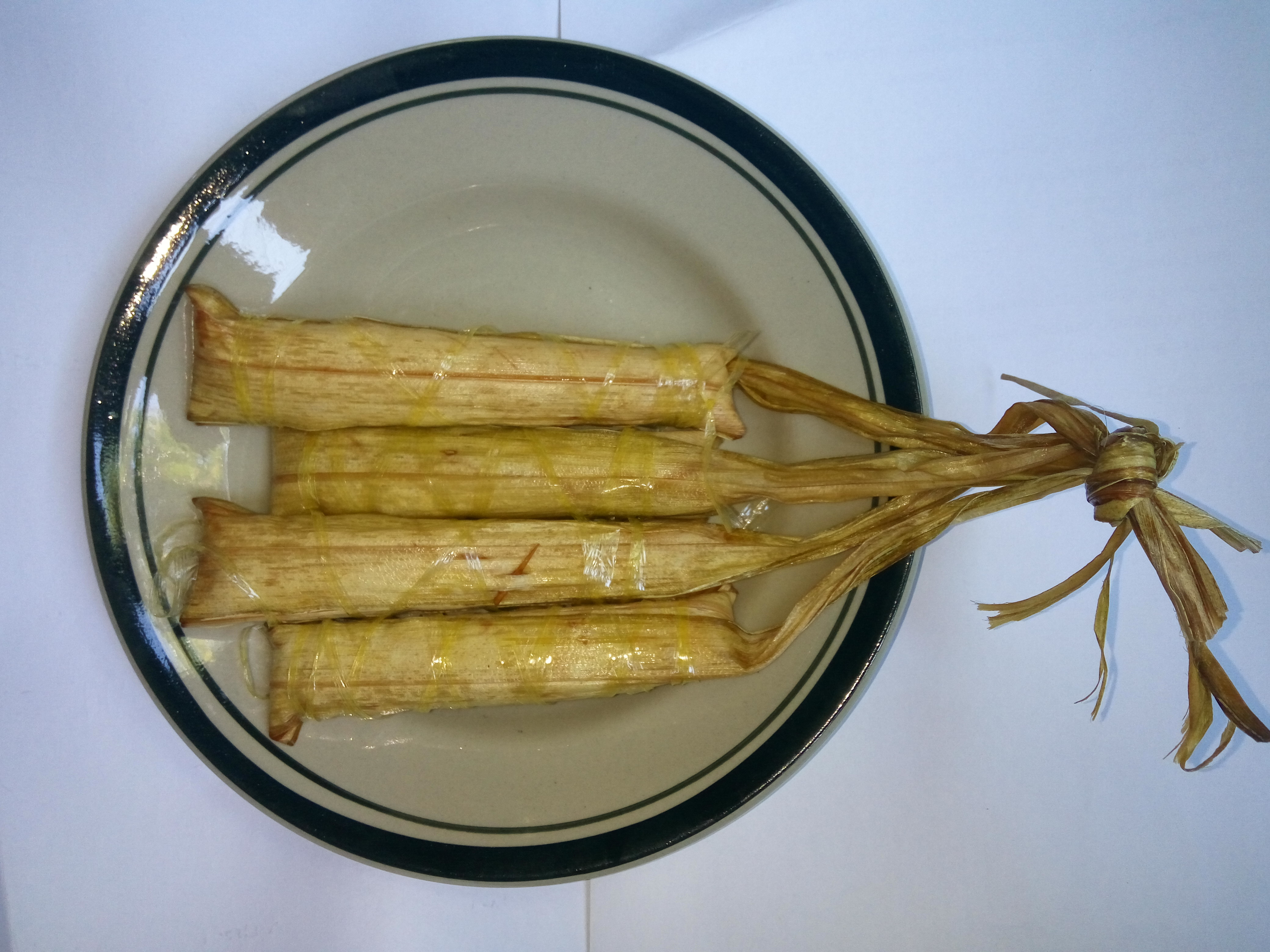
Kelupis

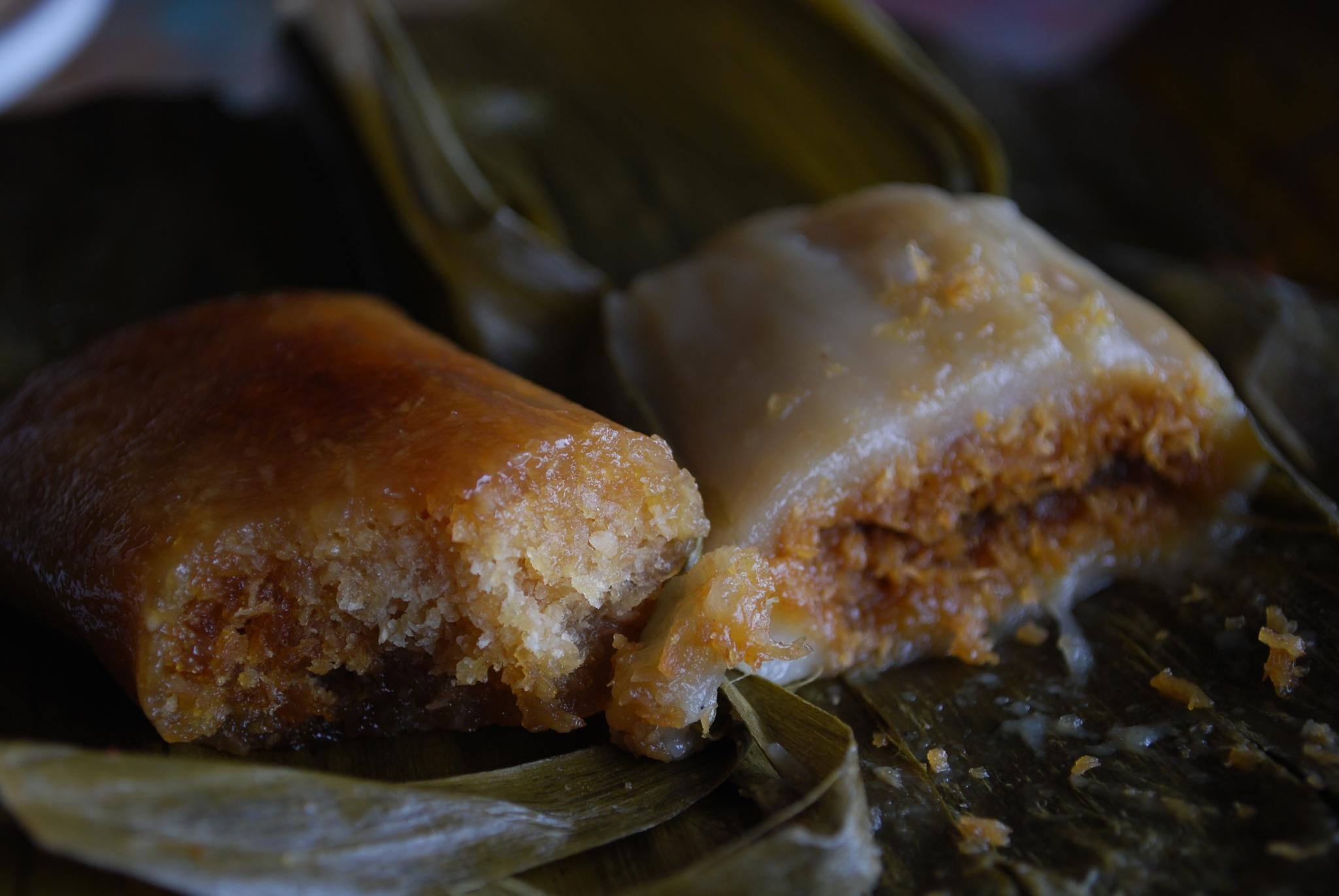
Kuih Kochi

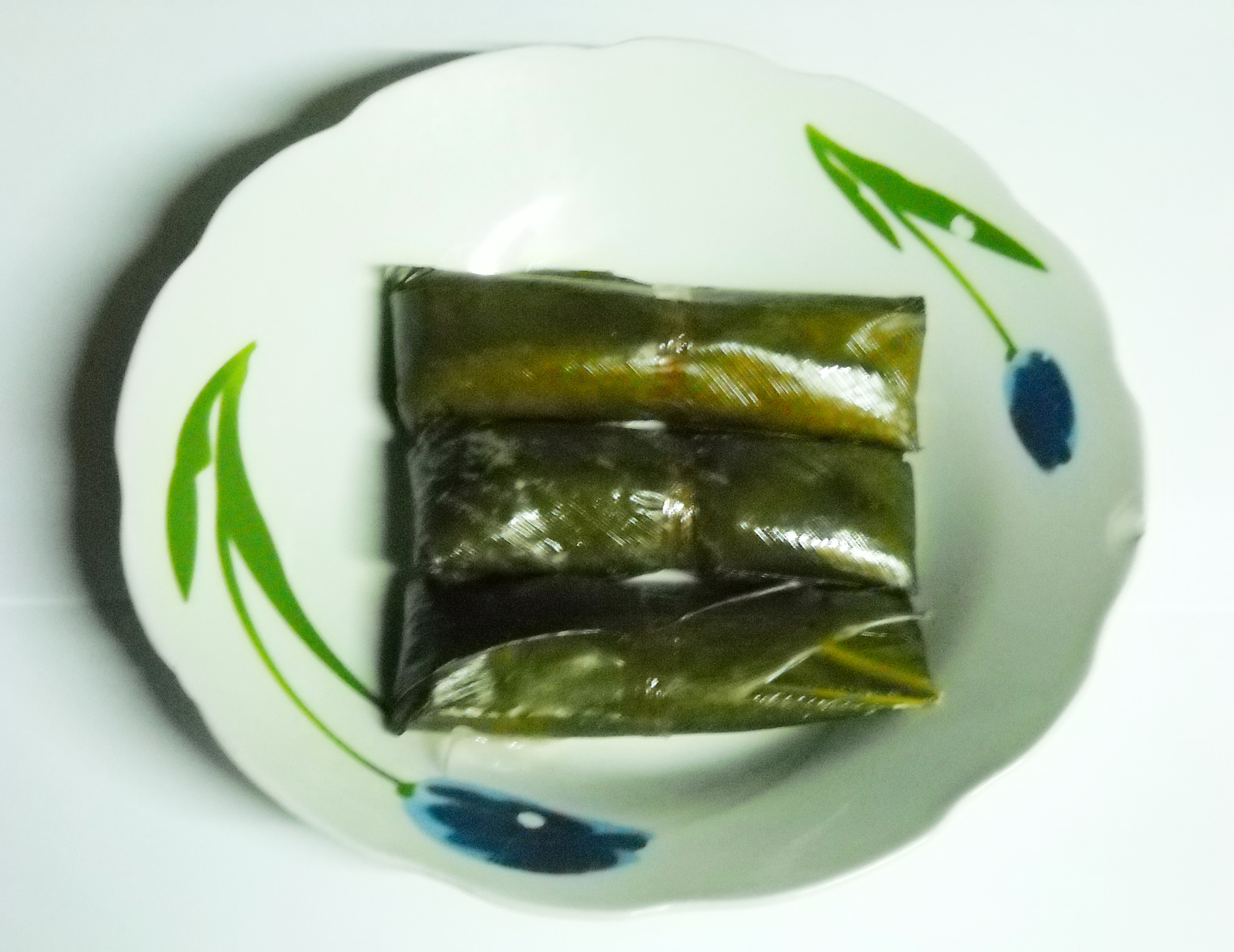
Lamban

In Malaysia, glutinous rice is known as pulut. It is usually mixed with santan (coconut milk) along with a bit of salt to add some taste. It is widely used during the Raya festive seasons as traditional food which is shared with certain parts of Indonesia, such as:

- Dodol – traditional sweets made of glutinous rice flour and coconut sugar. Similar variants are wajik (or wajit).
- Inang-inang – glutinous rice cracker. Popular in Melaka.
- Kelupis – a type of glutinous rice kuih in East Malaysia.
- Ketupat – square-shaped crafts made from the same local leaves as palas, but it is usually filled with regular rice grains instead of pulut, though it depends on the maker.
- Kochi – Malay-Peranakan sweet and sticky kuih.
- Lamban – another type of glutinous rice dessert in East Malaysia.
- Lemang – wrapped in banana leaves and inside a bamboo, and left to be barbecued/grilled on an open fire, to make the taste and texture tender and unique.
- Pulut inti – wrapped in banana leaf in the shape of a pyramid, this kuih consists of glutinous rice with a covering of grated coconut candied with palm sugar.
- Pulut panggang – glutinous rice parcels stuffed with a spiced filling, then wrapped in banana leaves and char-grilled. Depending on the regional tradition, the spiced filling may include pulverised dried prawns, caramelised coconut paste or beef floss. In the state of Sarawak, the local pulut panggang contains no fillings and is wrapped in pandan leaves instead.
- Tapai – cooked glutinous rice fermented with yeast, wrapped in banana, rubber tree or roseapple leaves.

=== Myanmar ===
Glutinous rice, called kao hnyin (ကောက်ညှင်း), is very popular in Myanmar (also known as Burma).

- Kao hnyin baung (ကောက်ညှင်းပေါင်း) is a breakfast dish with boiled peas (pèbyouk) or with a variety of fritters, such as urad dal (baya gyaw), served on a banana leaf. It may be cooked wrapped in a banana leaf, often with peas, and served with a sprinkle of salted toasted sesame seeds and often grated coconut.
- The purple variety, known as kao hynin ngacheik (ကောင်းညှင်းငချိမ့်), is equally popular cooked as ngacheik paung.
- They may both be cooked and pounded into cakes with sesame called hkaw bouk, another favourite version in the north among the Shan and the Kachin, and served grilled or fried.
- The Htamanè pwè festival (ထမနဲပွဲ) takes place on the full moon of Dabodwè(တပို့တွဲ) (February), when htamanè (ထမနဲ) is cooked in a huge wok. Two men, each with a wooden spoon the size of an oar, and a third man coordinate the action of folding and stirring the contents, which include kao hnyin, ngacheik, coconut shavings, peanuts, sesame and ginger in peanut oil.
- Si htamin (ဆီထမင်း) is glutinous rice cooked with turmeric and onions in peanut oil, and served with toasted sesame and crisp-fried onions; it is a popular breakfast like kao hnyin baung and ngacheik paung.
- Paung din (ပေါင်းတင်) or "Kao hyin kyi tauk" (ကောင်းညှင်းကျည်တောက်) is another ready-to-eat portable form cooked in a segment of bamboo. When the bamboo is peeled off, a thin skin remains around the rice and also gives off a distinctive aroma.

Glutinous rice (Paung din type) preparation in Myanmar.

- Mont let kauk (မုန့်လက်ကောက်) is made from glutinous rice flour; it is donut-shaped and fried like baya gyaw, but eaten with a dip of jaggery or palm sugar syrup.
- Nga pyaw douk (ငပျောထုပ်) or "Kao hynin htope" (ကောင်းညှင်းထုပ်), banana in glutinous rice, wrapped in banana leaf and steamed and served with grated coconut – another favourite snack, like kao hnyin baung and mont let kauk, sold by street hawkers.
- Mont lone yay baw (မုန့်လုံးရေပေါ်) are glutinous rice balls with jaggery inside, thrown into boiling water in a huge wok, and ready to serve as soon as they resurface. Their preparation is a tradition during Thingyan, the Burmese New Year festival.
- Htoe mont (ထိုးမုန့်), glutinous rice cake with raisins, cashews and coconut shavings, is a traditional dessert for special occasions. It is appreciated as a gift item from Mandalay.
Burmese glutinous rice dishes

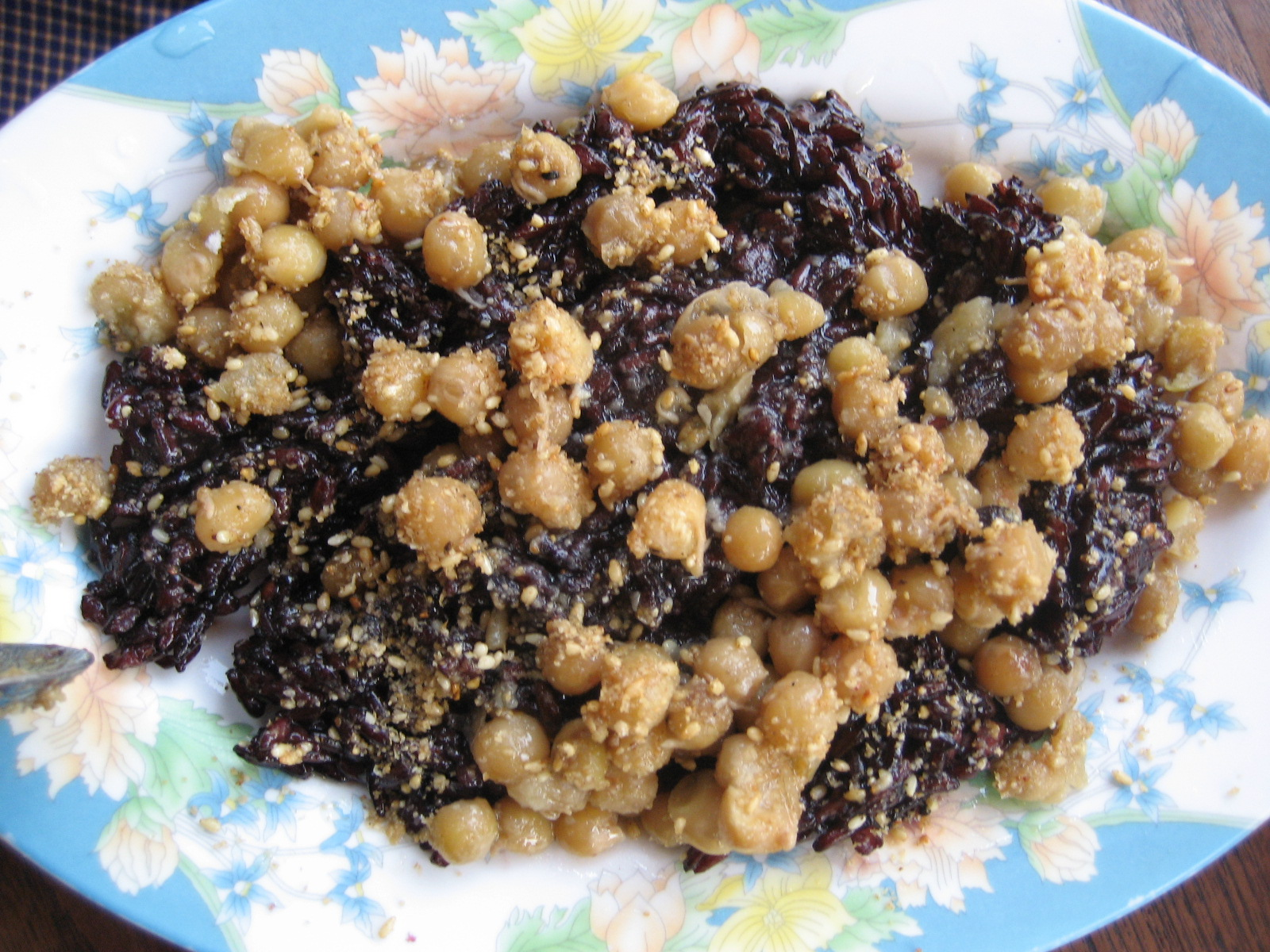
Ngacheik paung with pèbyouk (boiled peas) and salted toasted sesame

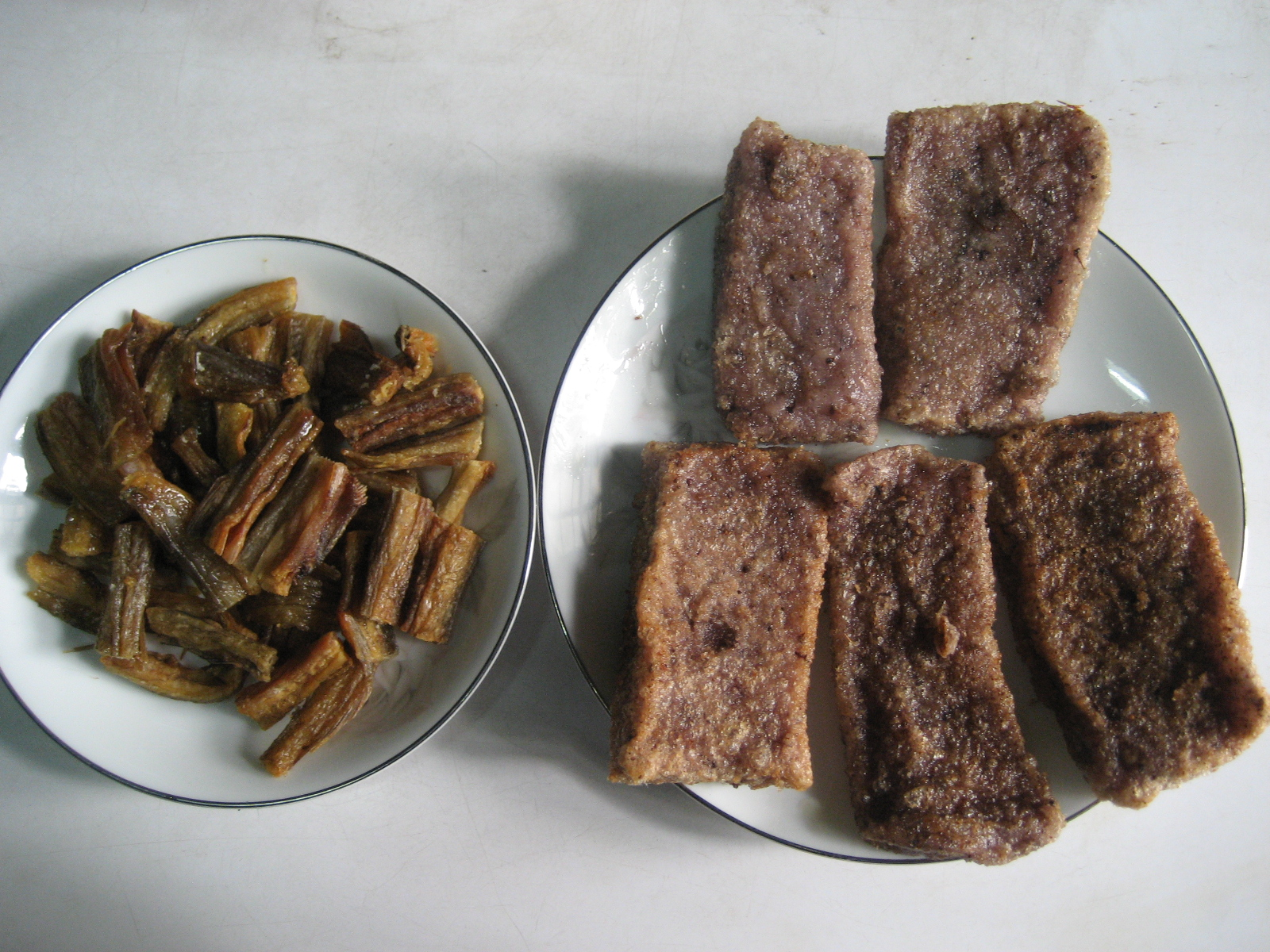
Hkaw bouk – dried cakes of ngacheik glutinous rice with Bombay duck, both fried

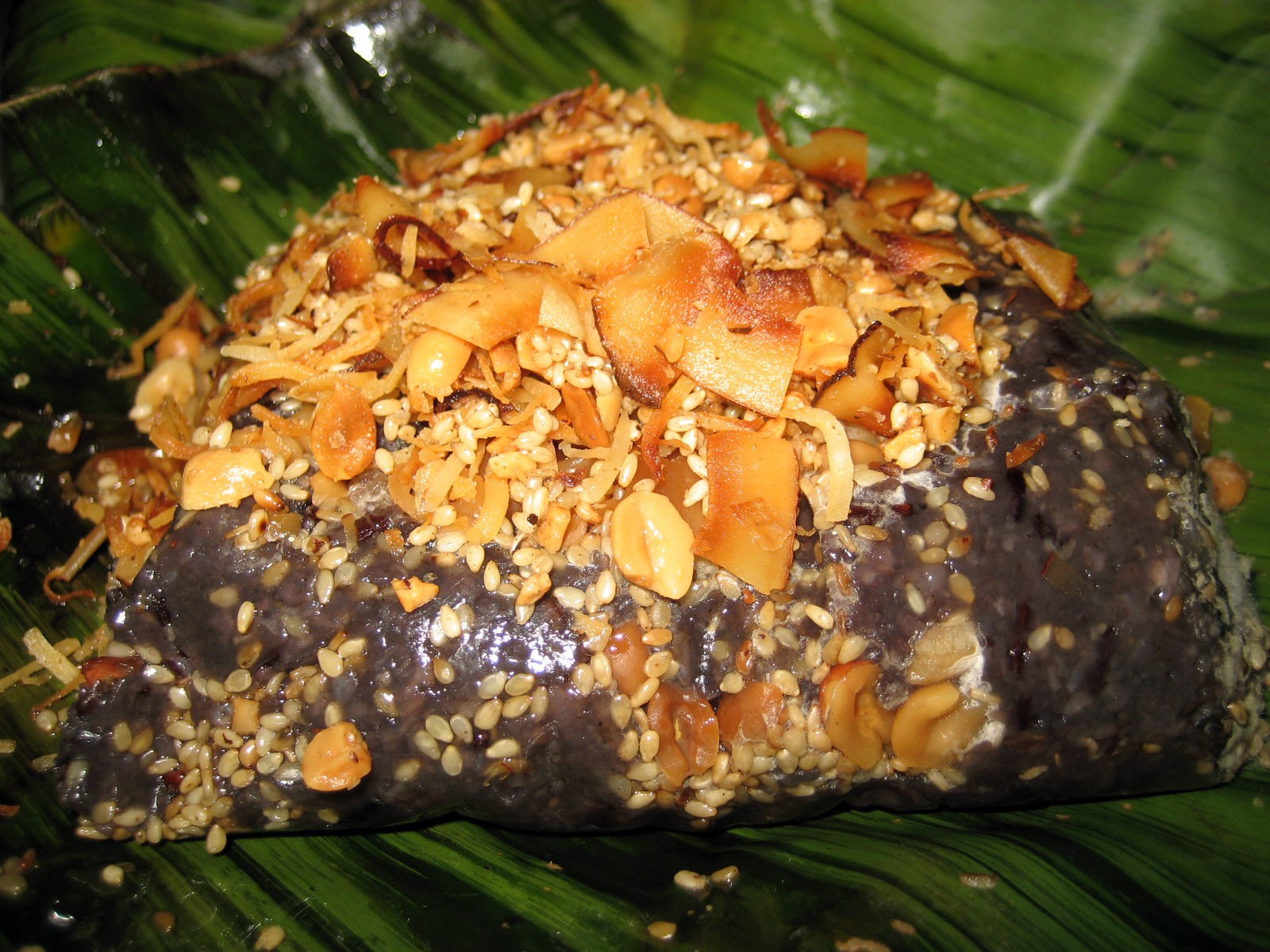
Htamanè – glutinous rice with fried coconut, roasted peanuts, sesame and ginger

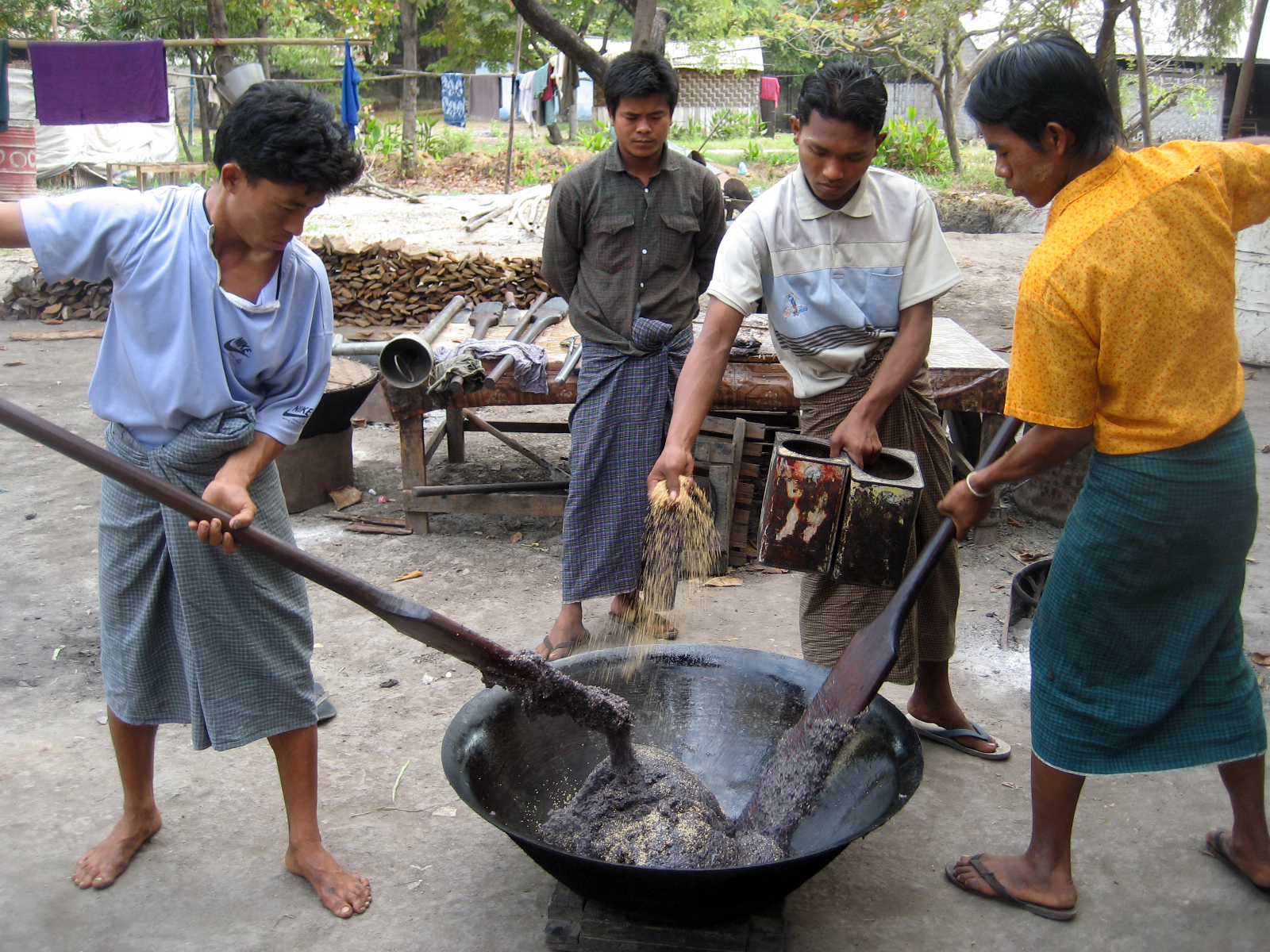
The traditional way of making special glutinous rice htamanè is still practiced

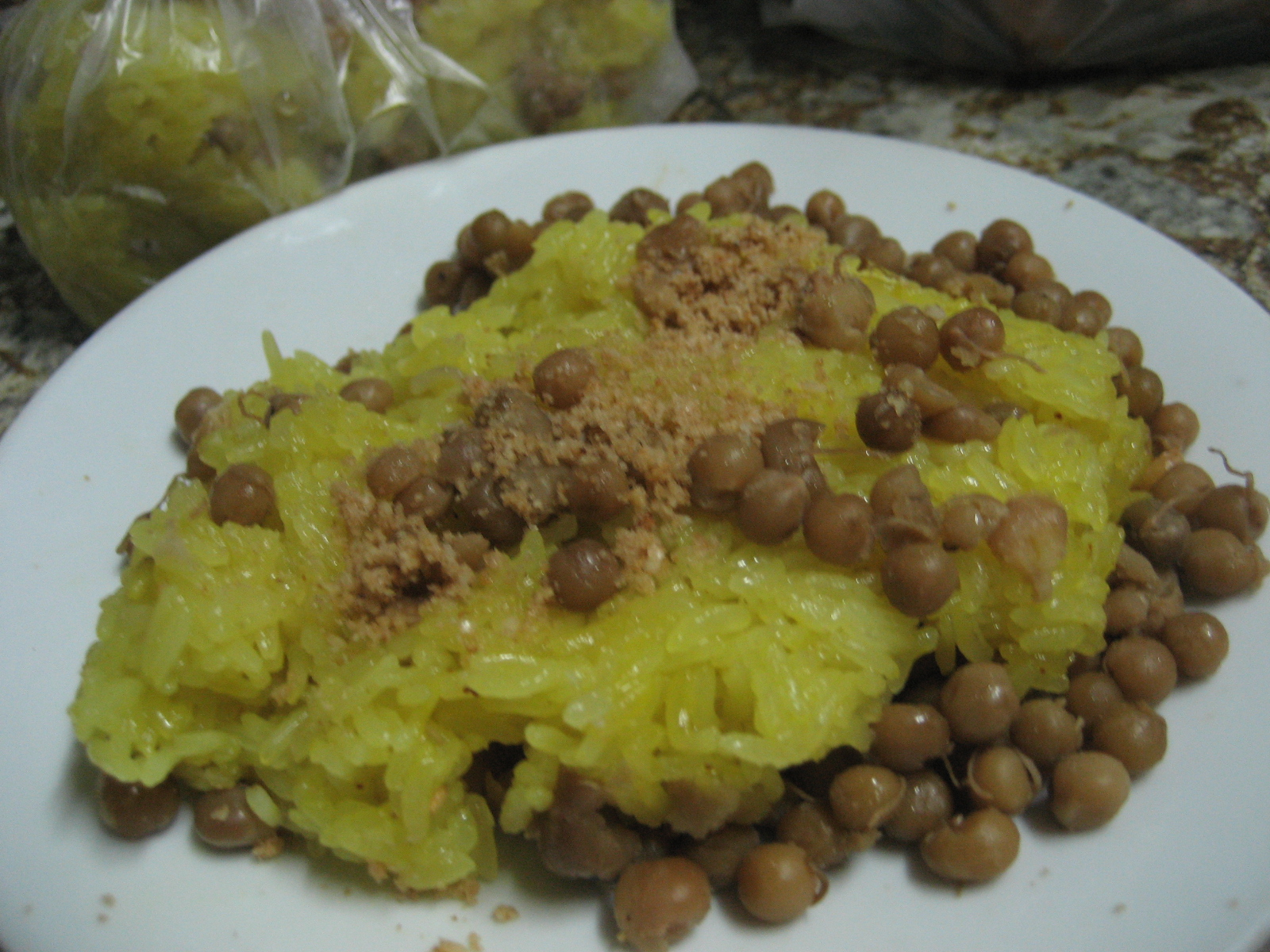
Si htamin – glutinous rice cooked in oil with turmeric and served with boiled peas and crushed salted sesame

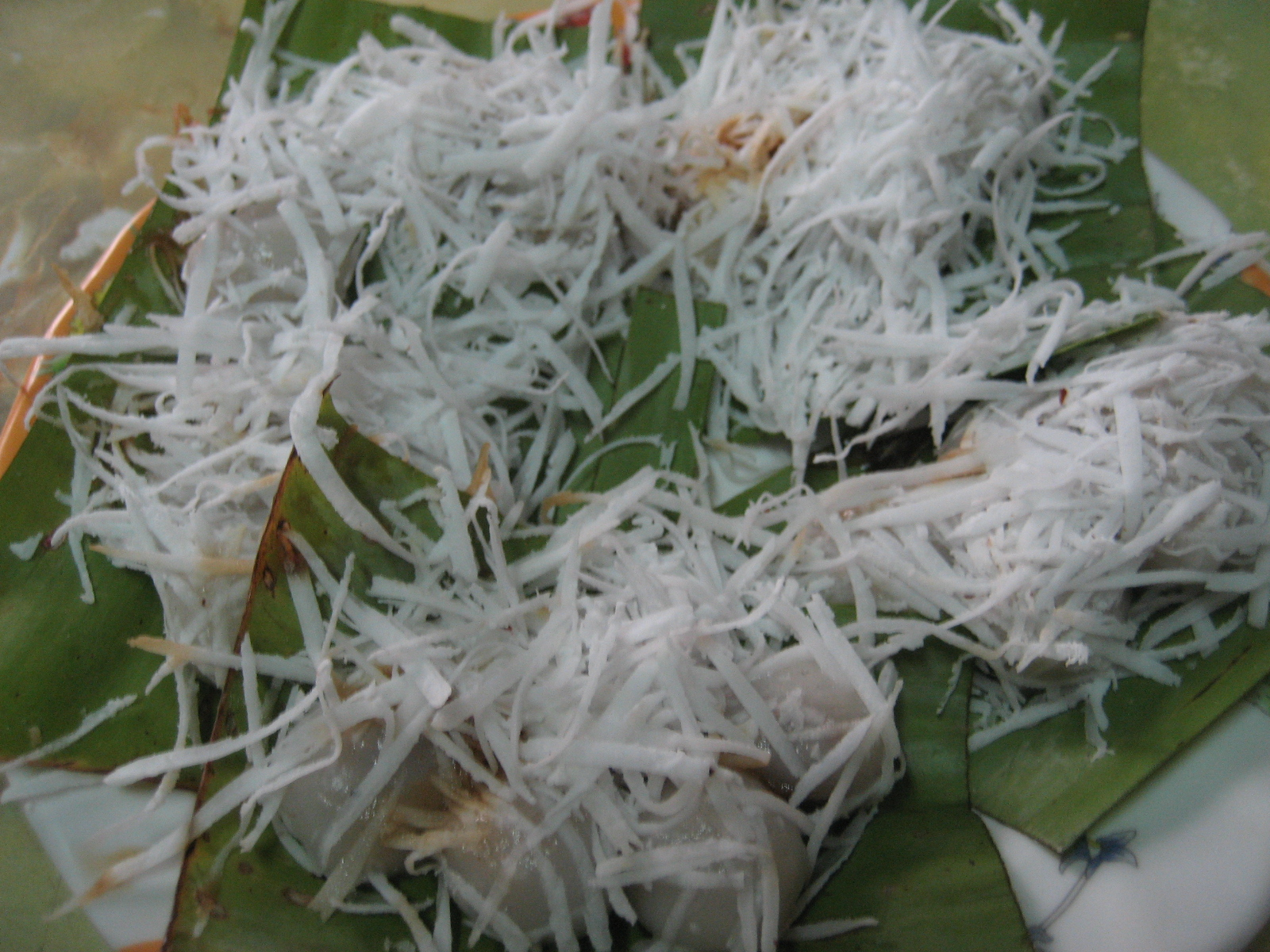
Mont lone yei baw – glutinous rice balls filled with jaggery, covered with shredded coconut – a New Year treat

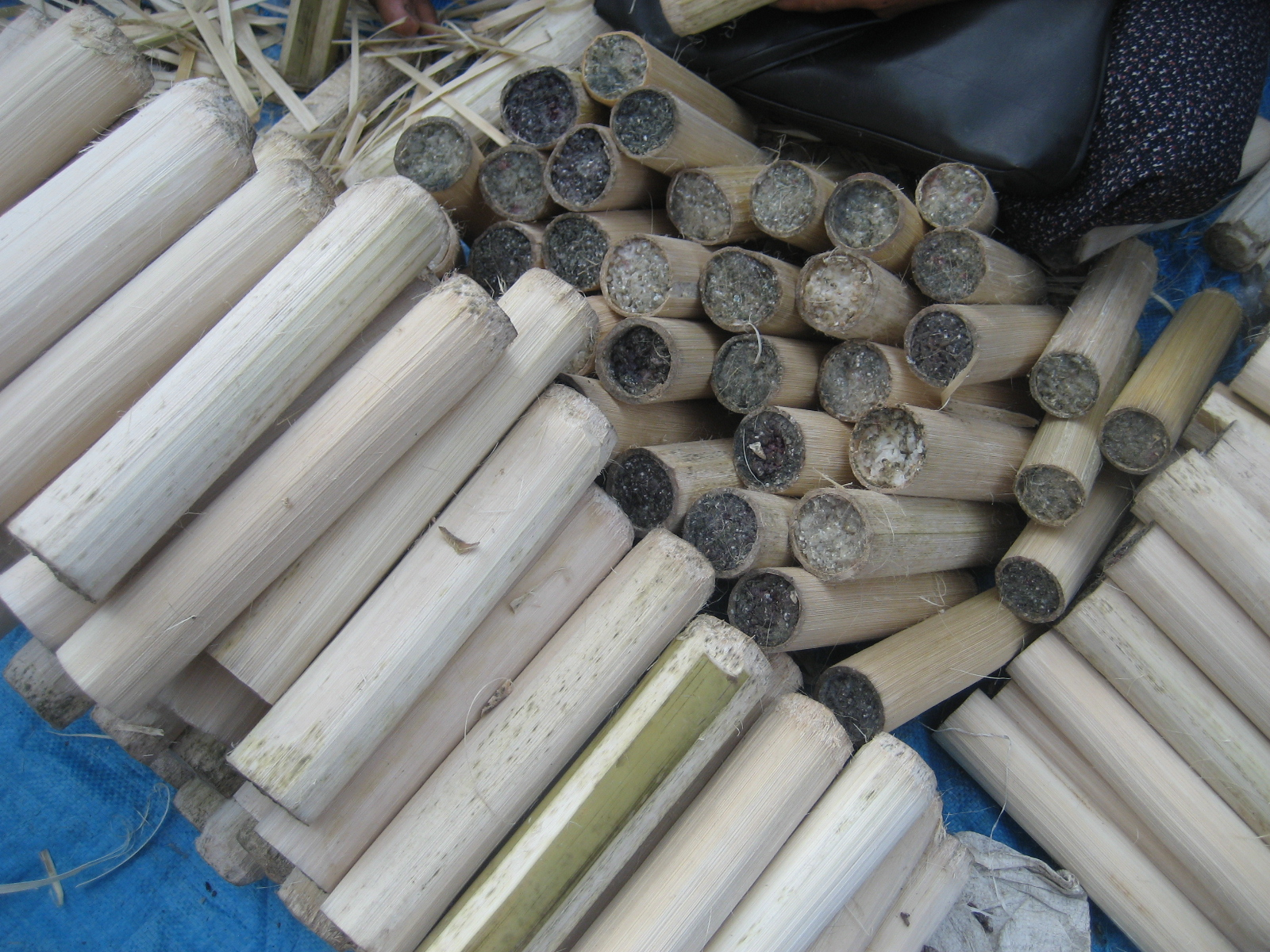
Paung din – glutinous rice, both purple and white varieties, cooked in bamboo tubes

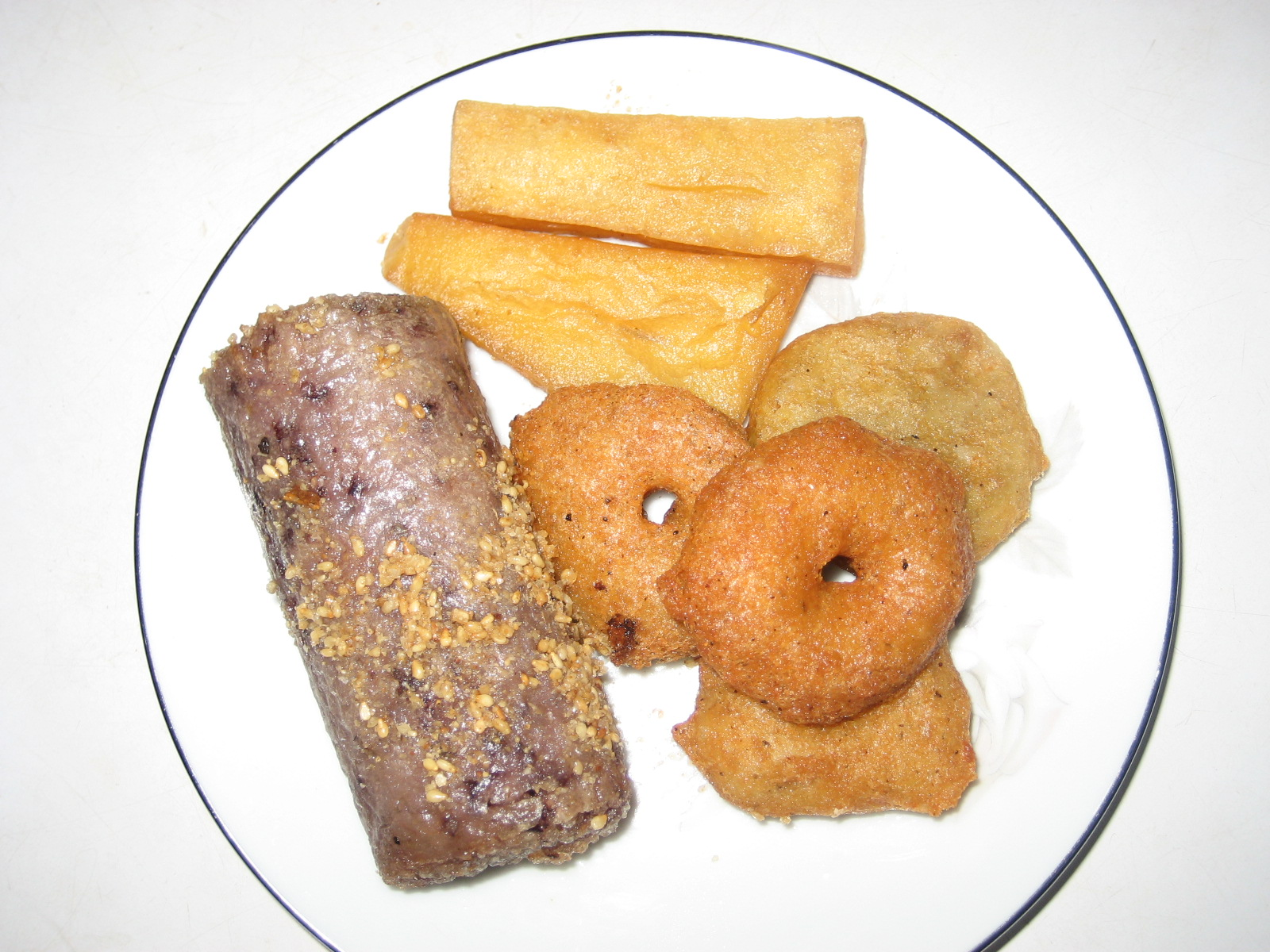
Paung din (ngacheik) with to hpu (Burmese tofu), mashed potato and black gram fritters

=== Nepal ===
In Nepal, Latte/Chamre is a popular dish made from glutinous rice during Teej festival.

Andik bhaat is often eaten by Tharu communities during Dashain and Tihar festivals.

=== Northeastern India ===
Sticky rice called bora saul is the core component of indigenous Assamese sweets, snacks, and breakfast. This rice is widely used in the traditional sweets of Assam, which are very different from the traditional sweets of India whose basic component is milk.

Such traditional sweets in Assam are Pitha (Narikolor pitha, Til pitha, Ghila pitha, Tel pitha, Keteli pitha, Sunga pitha, Sunga saul etc.). Also, its powder form is used as breakfast or other light meals directly with milk. They are called Pitha guri (if the powder was done without frying the rice, by just crushing it after soaking) or Handoh guri (if rice is dry fried first, and then crushed).

The soaked rice is also cooked with no added water inside a special kind of bamboo (called sunga saul bnaah). This meal is called sunga saul.

During religious ceremonies, indigenous Assamese communities make Mithoi (Kesa mithoi and Poka mithoi) using Gnud with it. Sometimes Bhog, Payokh are also made from it using milk and sugar with it.

Different indigenous Assamese communities make rice beer from sticky rice, preferring it over other varieties of rice for the sweeter and more alcoholic result. This rice beer is also offered to their gods and ancestors. Rice cooked with it is also taken directly as lunch or dinner on rare occasions. Similarly, other indigenous communities from NE India use sticky rice in various forms similar to the native Assamese style in their cuisine.

=== Philippines ===
In the Philippines, glutinous rice is known as malagkit in Tagalog or pilit in Visayan, among other names such as diket in Ilocano. Both mean "sticky". The most common way glutinous rice is prepared in the Philippines is by soaking uncooked glutinous rice in water or coconut milk (usually overnight) and then grinding it into a thick paste (traditionally with stone mills). This produces a rich and smooth viscous rice dough known as galapóng, which is the basis for numerous rice cakes in the Philippines. However, in modern preparation methods, galapong is sometimes made directly from dry glutinous rice flour (or from commercial Japanese mochiko), with poorer-quality results.

Galapong was traditionally allowed to ferment, which is still required for certain dishes. A small amount of starter culture of microorganisms (tapay or bubod) or palm wine (tubâ) may be traditionally added to rice being soaked to hasten the fermentation. These can be substituted with yeast or baking soda in modern versions. Other versions of galapong may also be treated with wood ash lye.

Aside from the numerous white and red glutinous rice cultivars, the most widely used glutinous rice heirloom cultivars in the Philippines are tapol rice, which is milky white in colour, and pirurutong rice, which ranges in colour from black to purple to reddish brown. However both varieties are expensive and becoming increasingly rare, thus some Filipino recipes nowadays substitute it with dyed regular glutinous rice or infuse purple yam (ube) to achieve the same colouration.

Dessert delicacies in the Philippines are known as kakanin (from kanin, "prepared rice"). These were originally made primarily from rice, but in recent centuries, the term has come to encompass dishes made from other types of flour, including corn flour (masa), cassava, wheat, and so on. Glutinous rice figures prominently in two main subtypes of kakanin: the puto (steamed rice cakes), and the bibingka (baked rice cakes). Both largely utilize glutinous rice galapong. A notable variant of puto is puto bumbong, which is made with pirurutong.

Other kakanin that use glutinous rice include suman, biko, and sapin-sapin among others. There is also a special class of boiled galapong dishes like palitaw, moche, mache, and masi. Fried galapong is also used to make various types of buchi, which are the local Chinese-Filipino versions of jian dui. They are also used to make puso, which are boiled rice cakes in woven leaf pouches.

Aside from kakanin, glutinous rice is also used in traditional Filipino rice gruels or porridges known as lugaw. They include both savory versions like arroz caldo or goto which are similar to Chinese-style congee; and dessert versions like champorado, binignit, and ginataang mais.

Filipino glutinous rice dishes

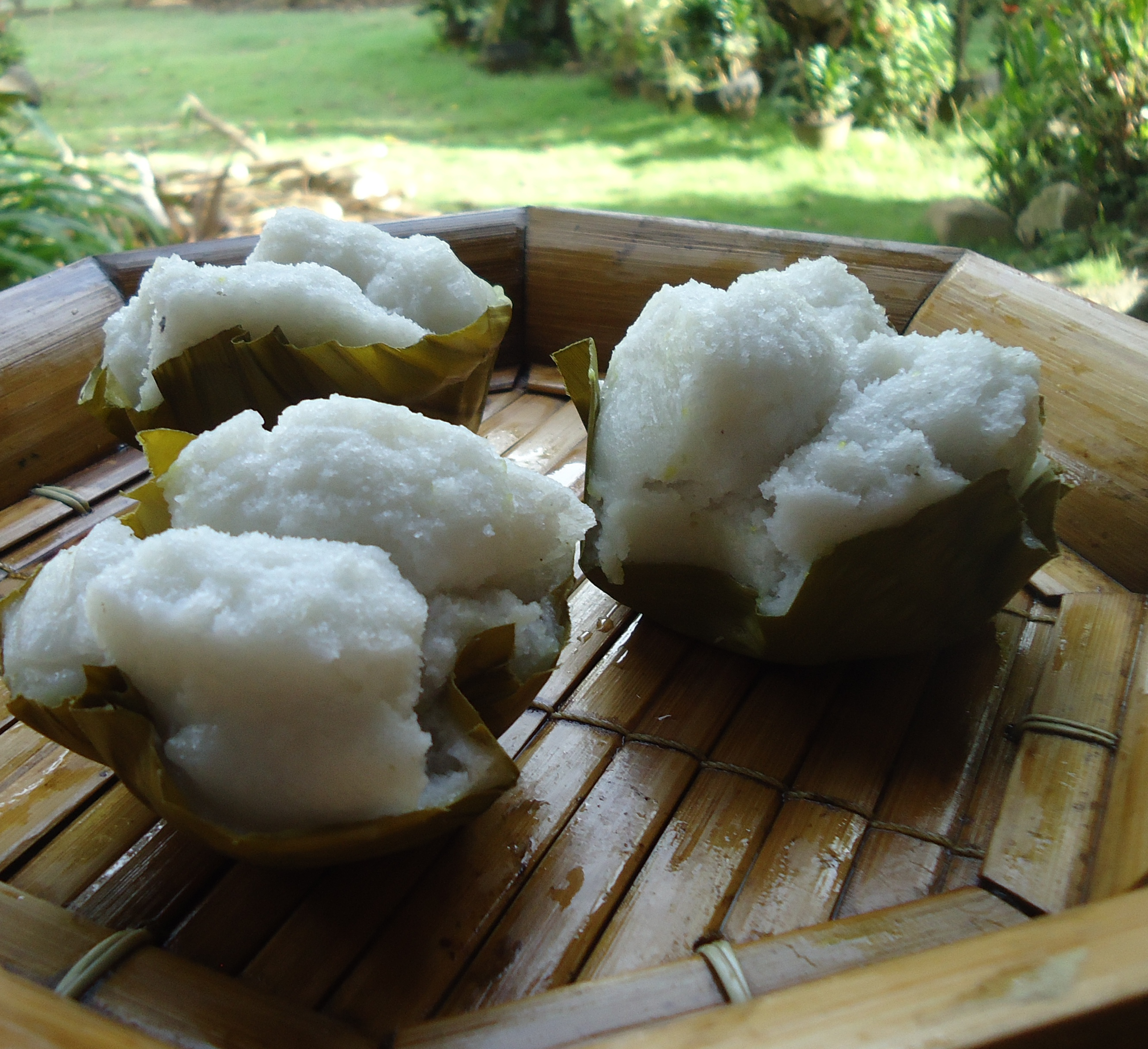
Puto, steamed rice cakes made with fermented galapong

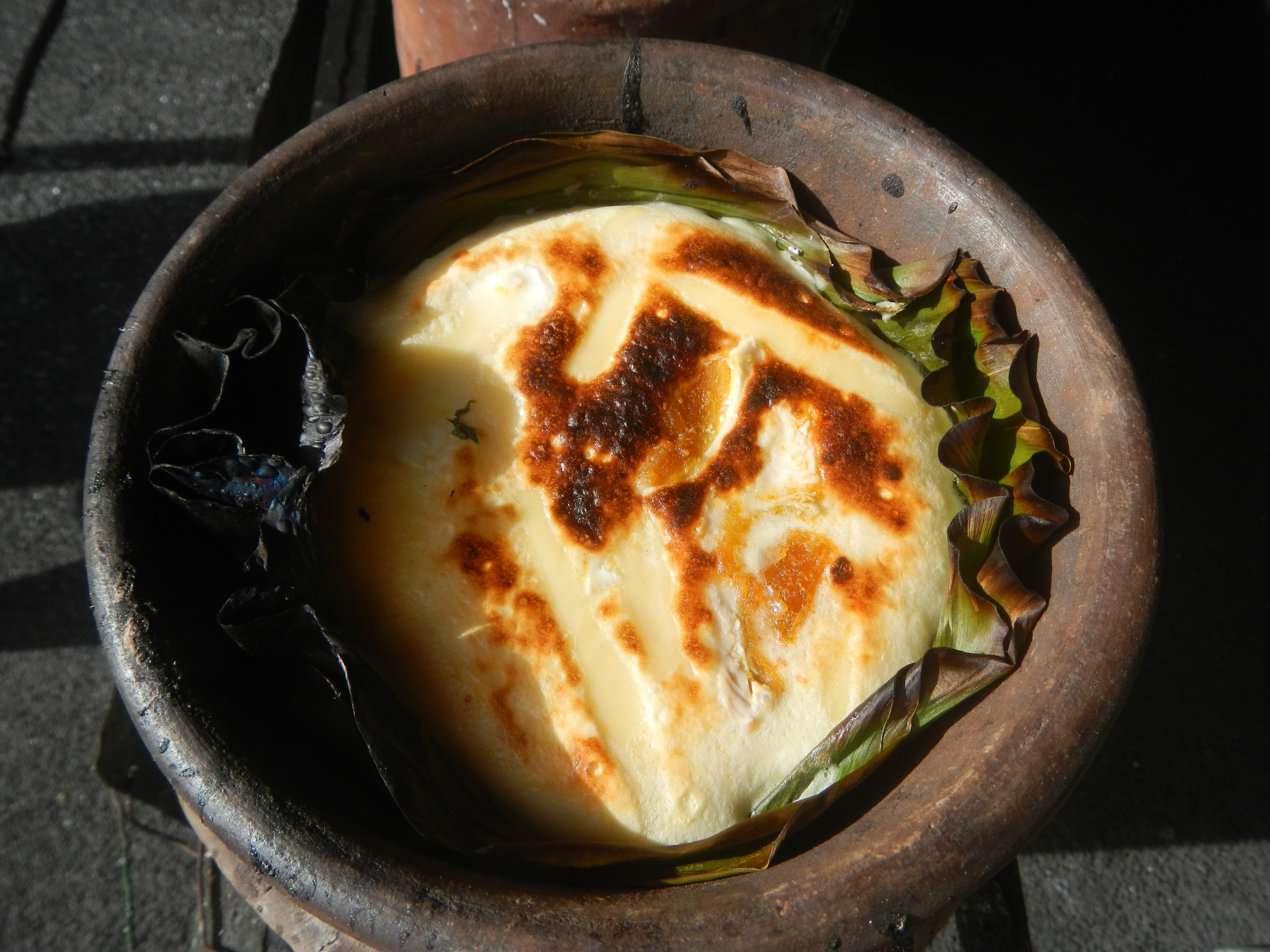
Bibingka, made from baked galapong with coconut milk

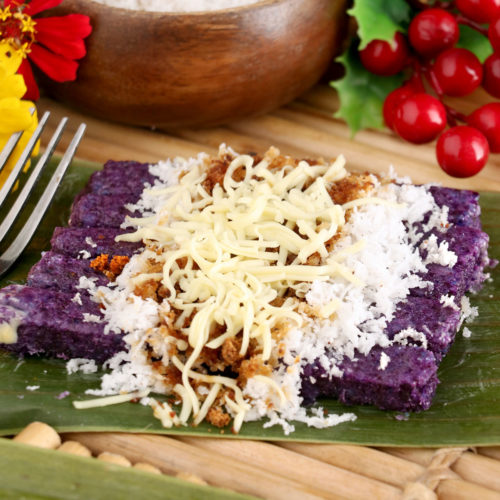
Puto bumbong, steamed rice cakes made with purple glutinous rice, steamed in bamboo tubes

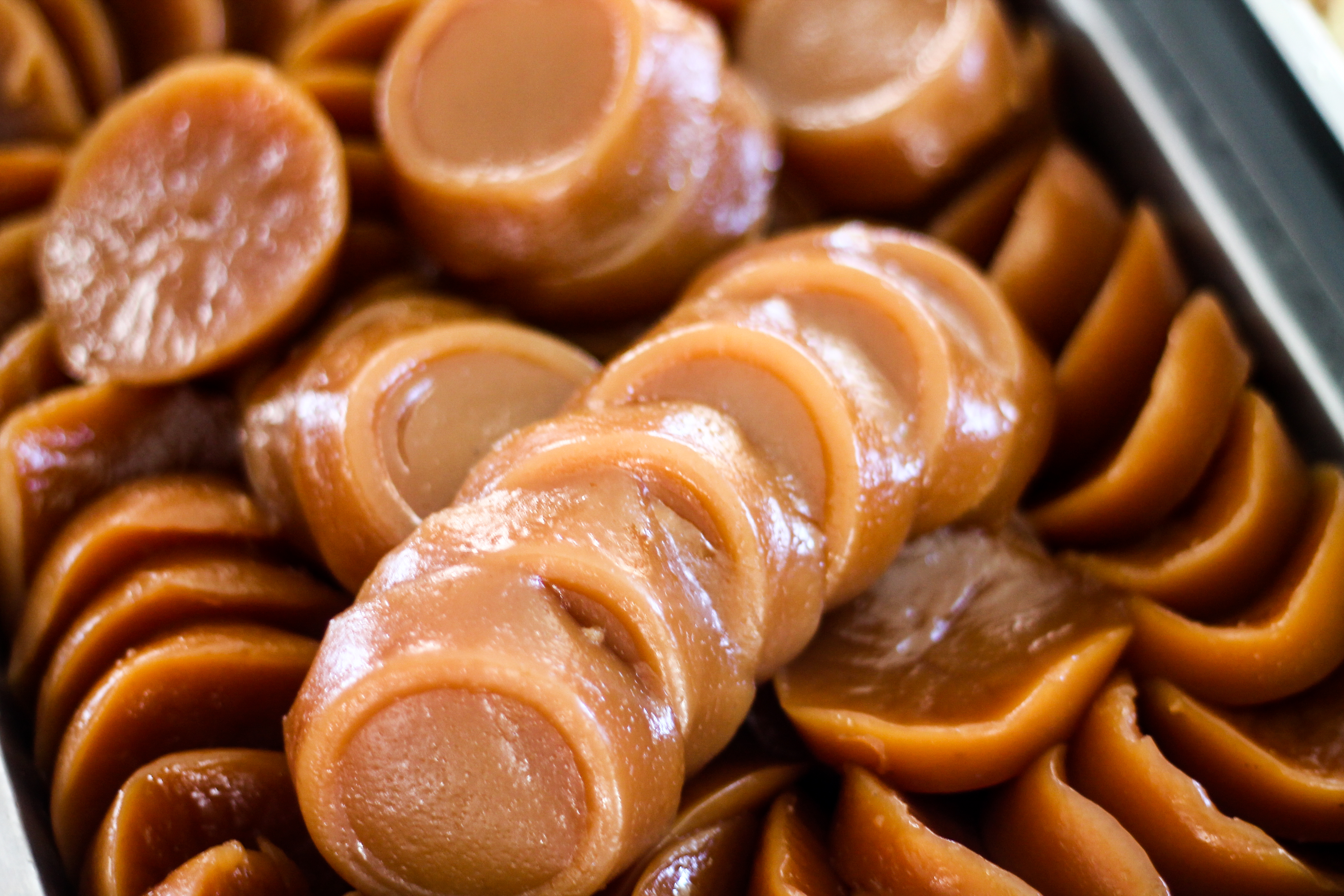
Cuchinta, glutinous rice cakes made with lye

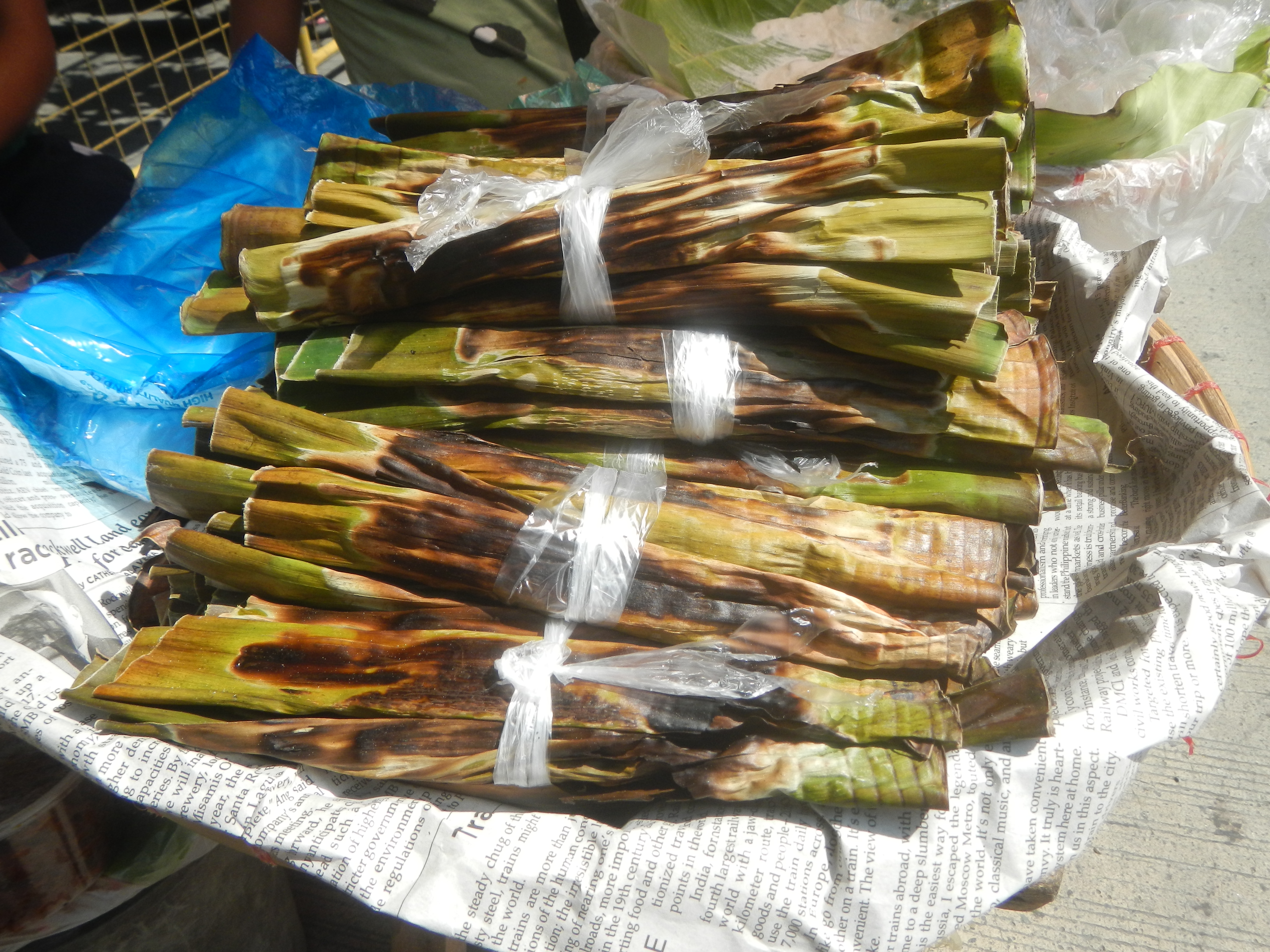
Tupig, made from ground glutinous rice, coconut strips, coconut milk, sugar, and wrapped in banana leaves

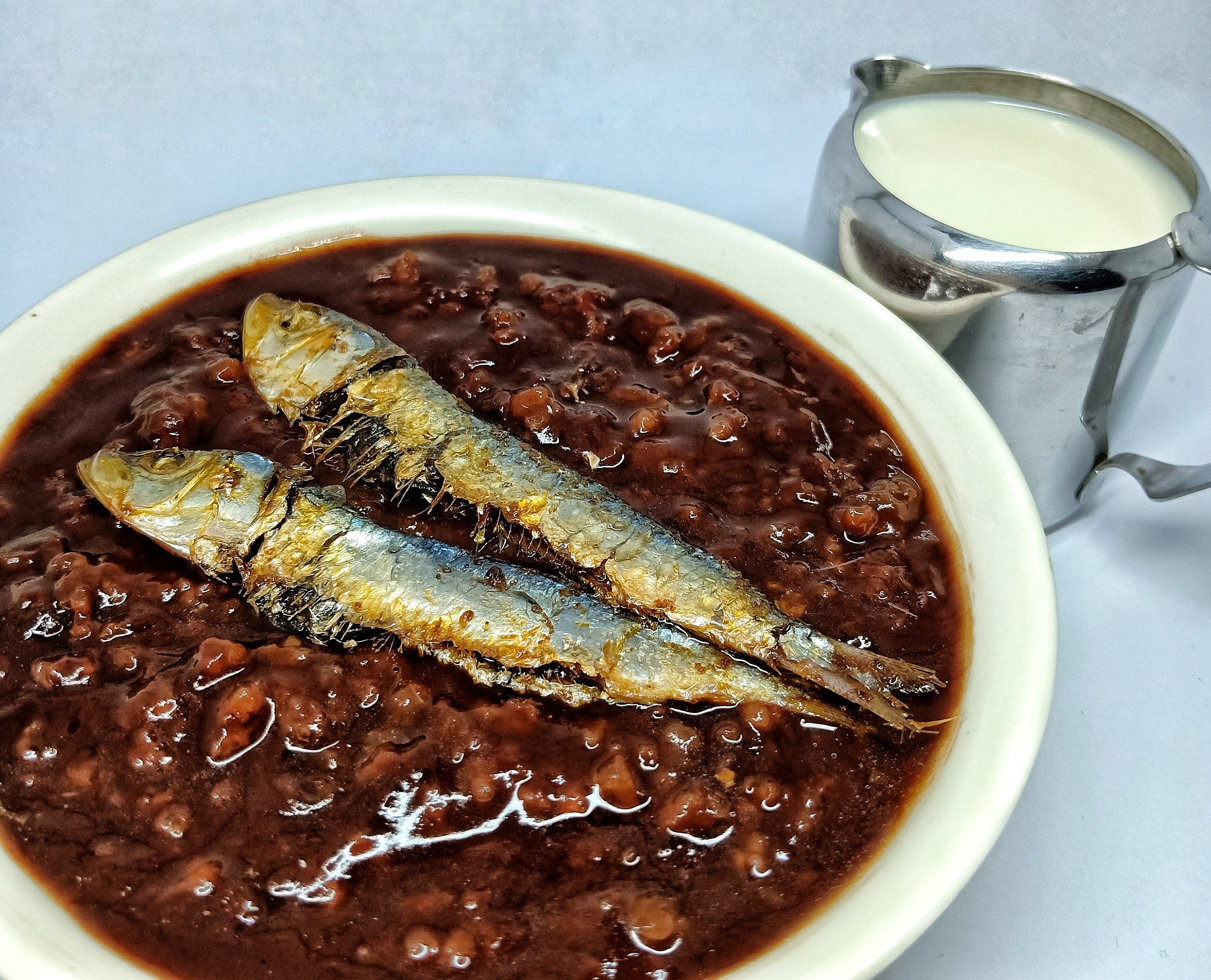
Champorado, dessert lugaw made from glutinous rice and chocolate

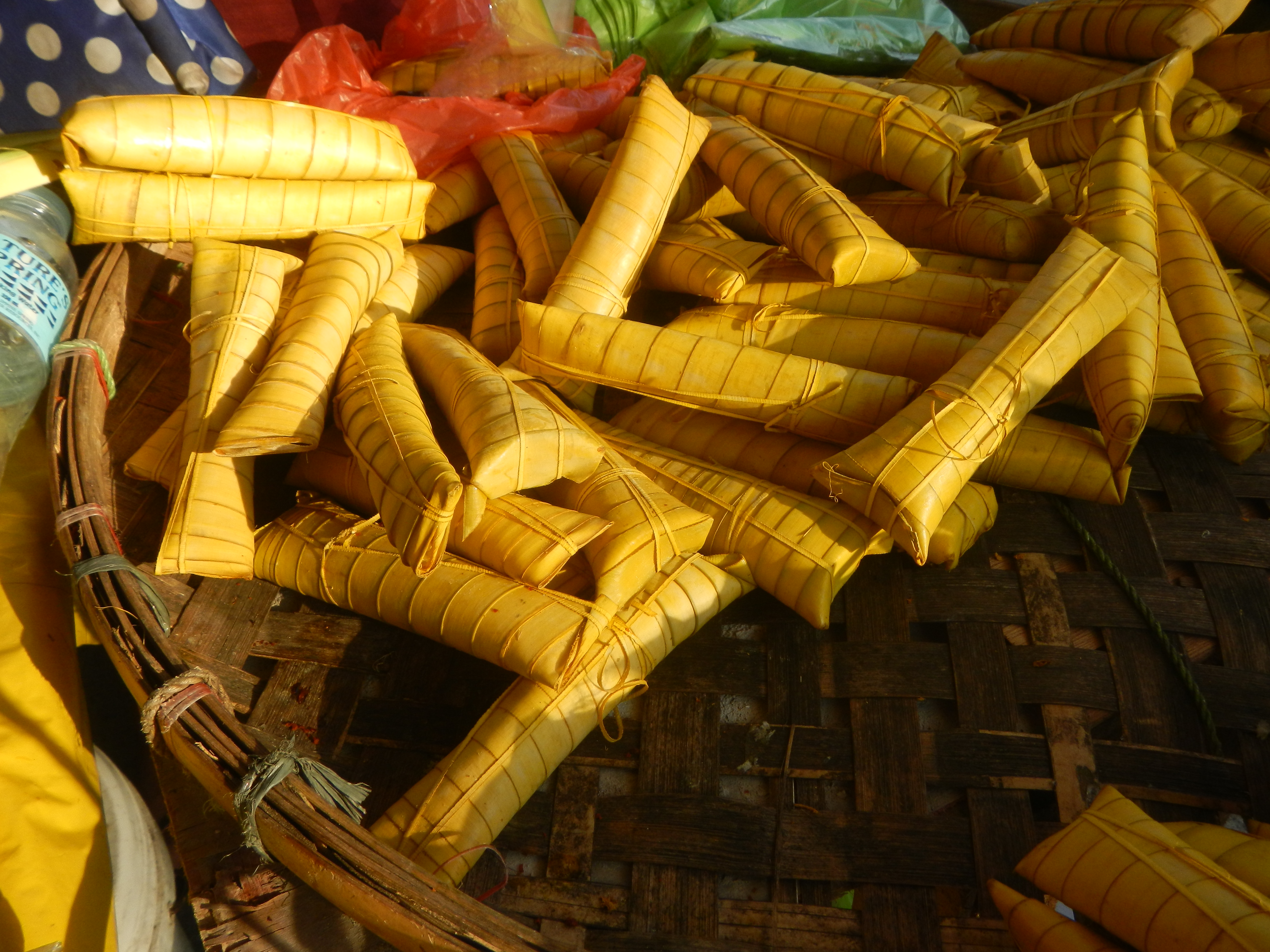
Suman sa ibus, a type of suman, steamed glutinous rice packaged in tagbak leaves

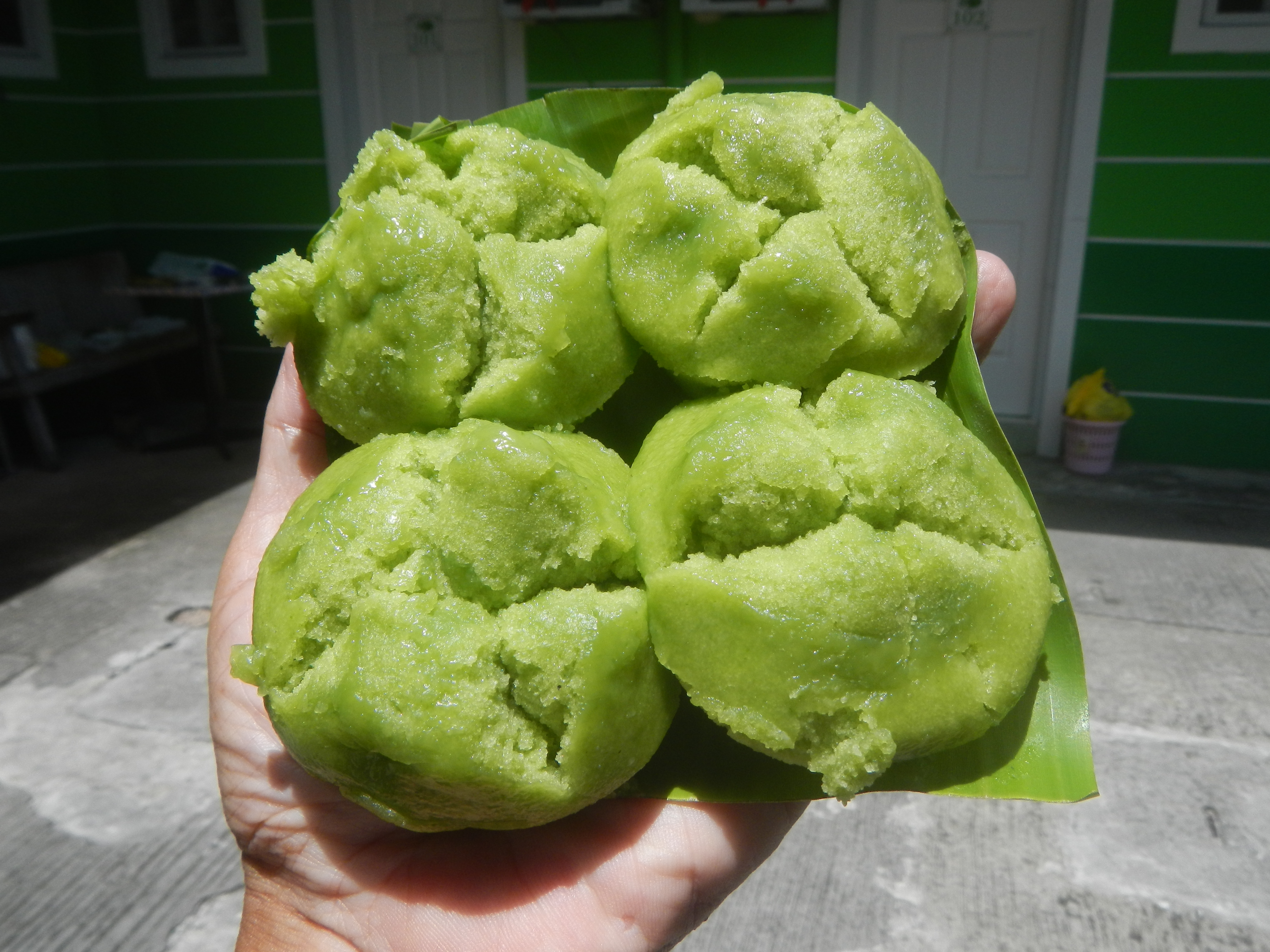
Puto pandan, a type of puto infused with pandan leaves, turning it light green

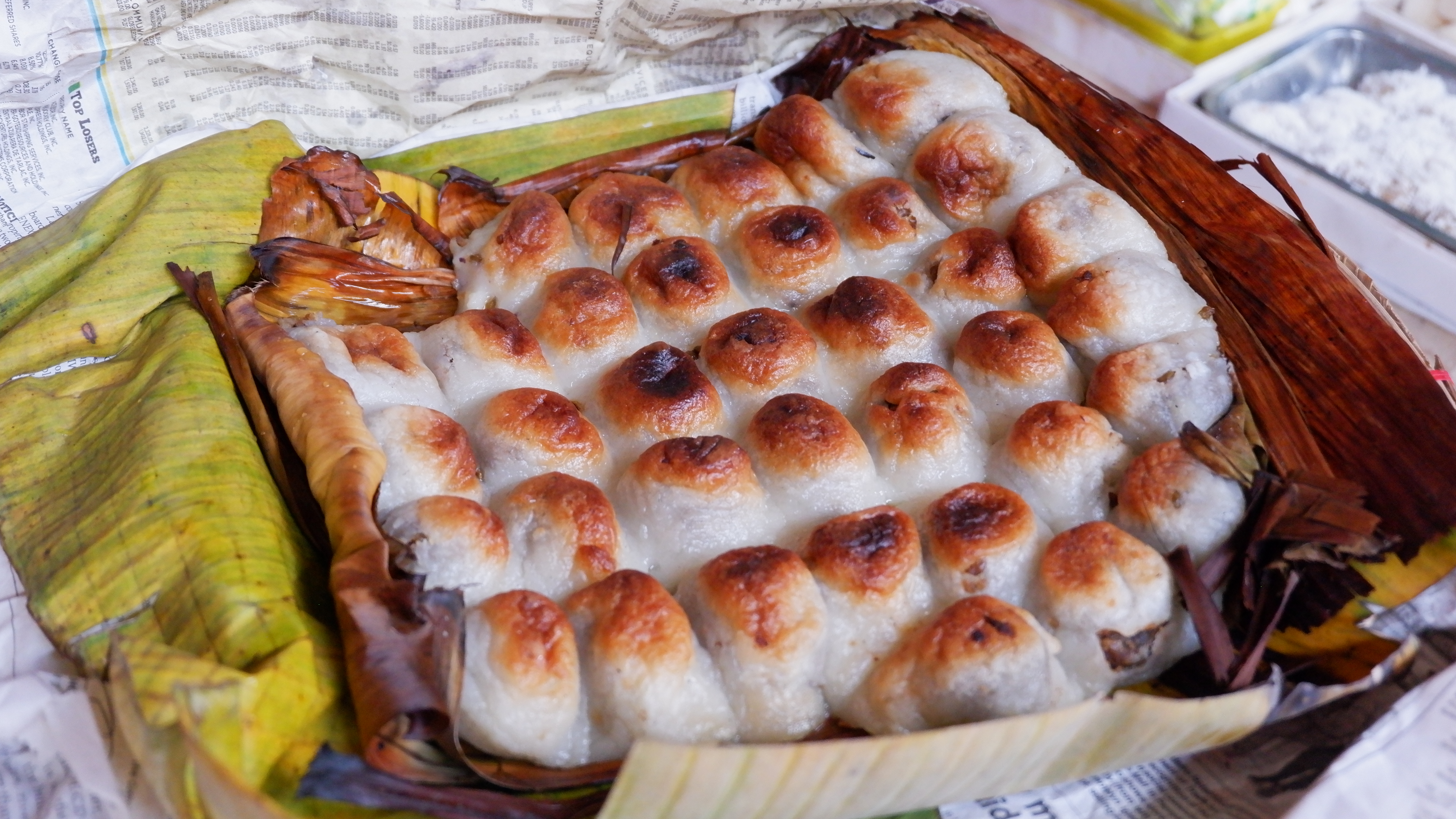
Bibingkoy, grilled glutinous rice dumpling filled with sweetened mung bean paste

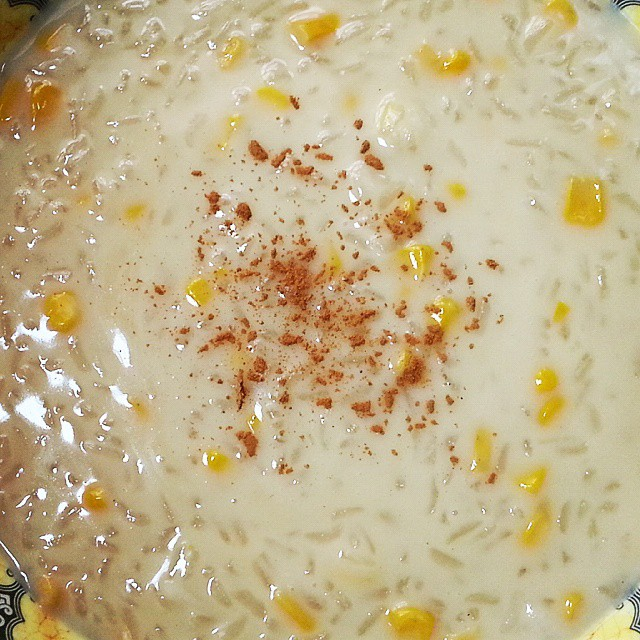
Ginataang mais, a dessert lugaw (rice gruel) with coconut milk and sweet corn

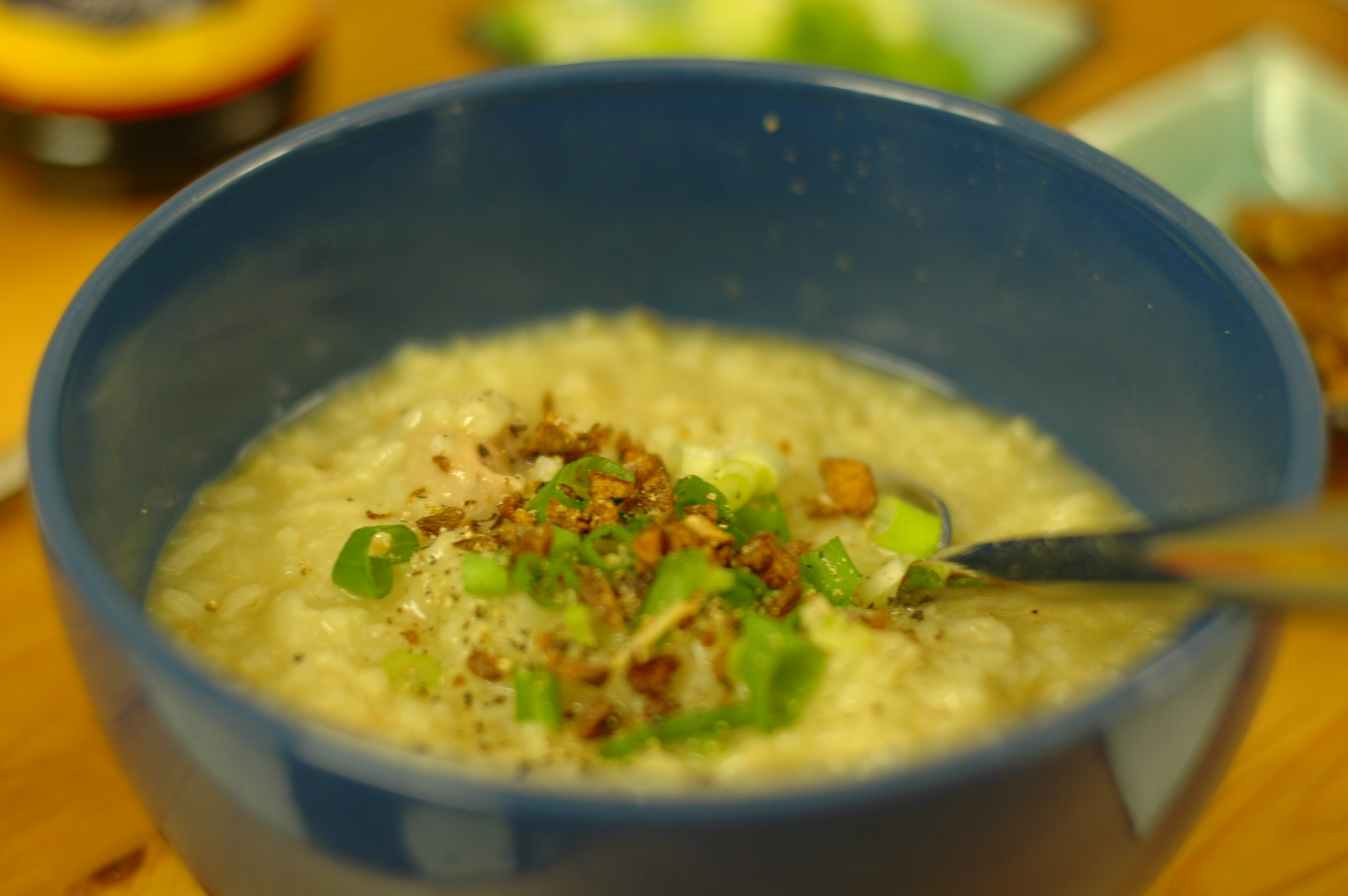
Arroz caldo, savoury lugaw with chicken, ginger, toasted garlic, scallions, and safflower

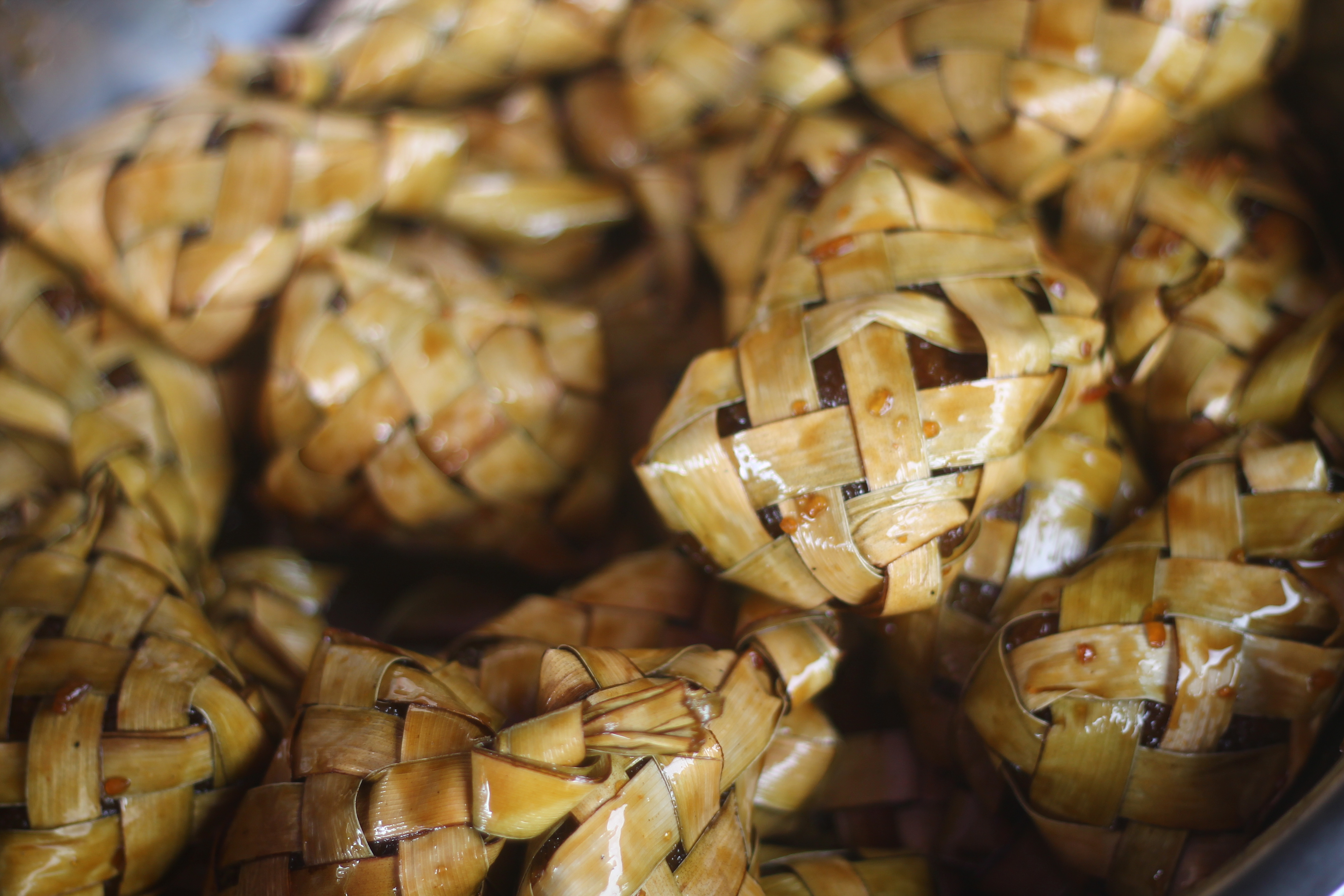
Patupat or Sinambong, made from glutinous rice, cooked in woven buri leaves and sugarcane juice

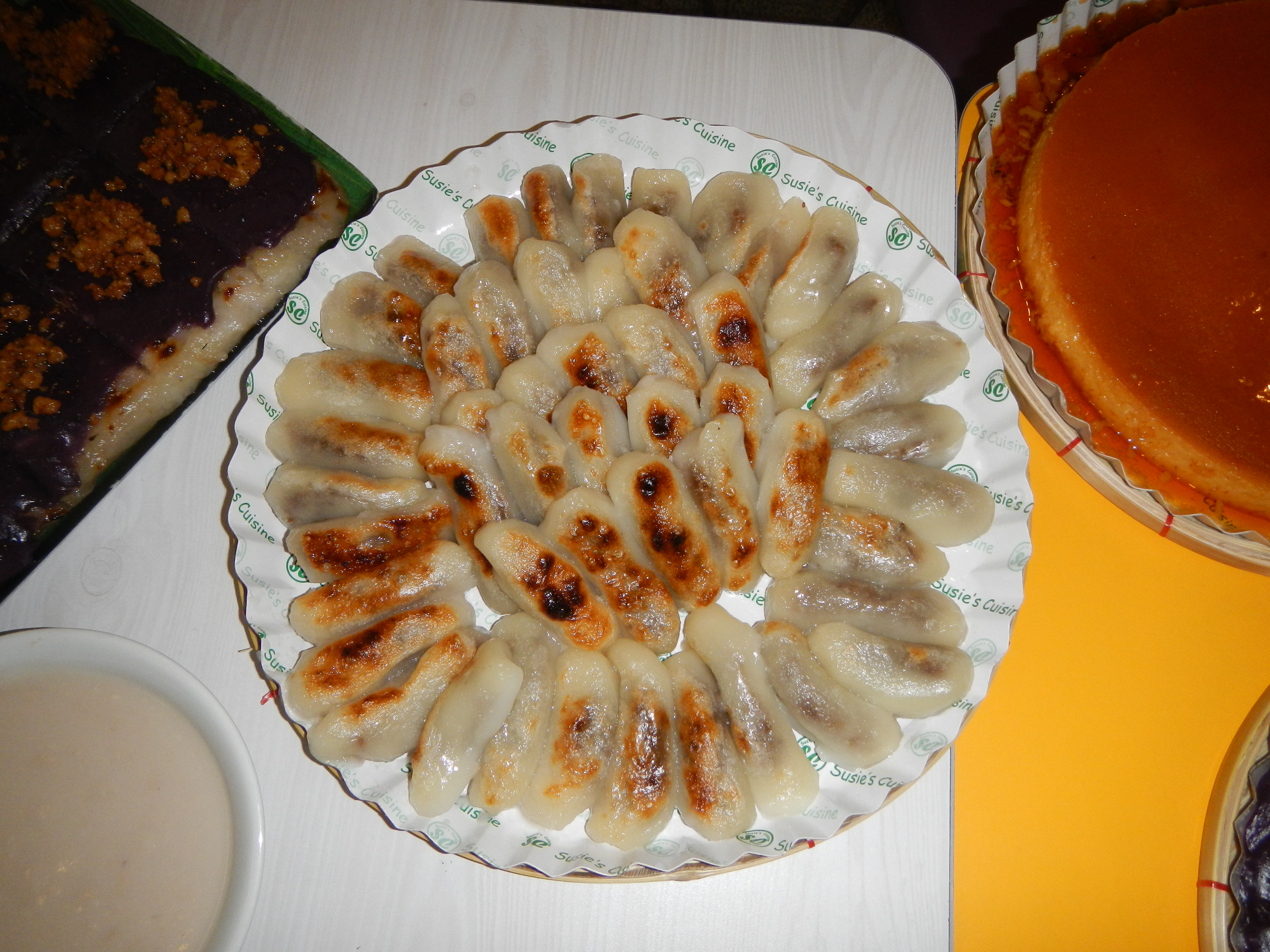
Moche, boiled glutinous rice filled with bean paste

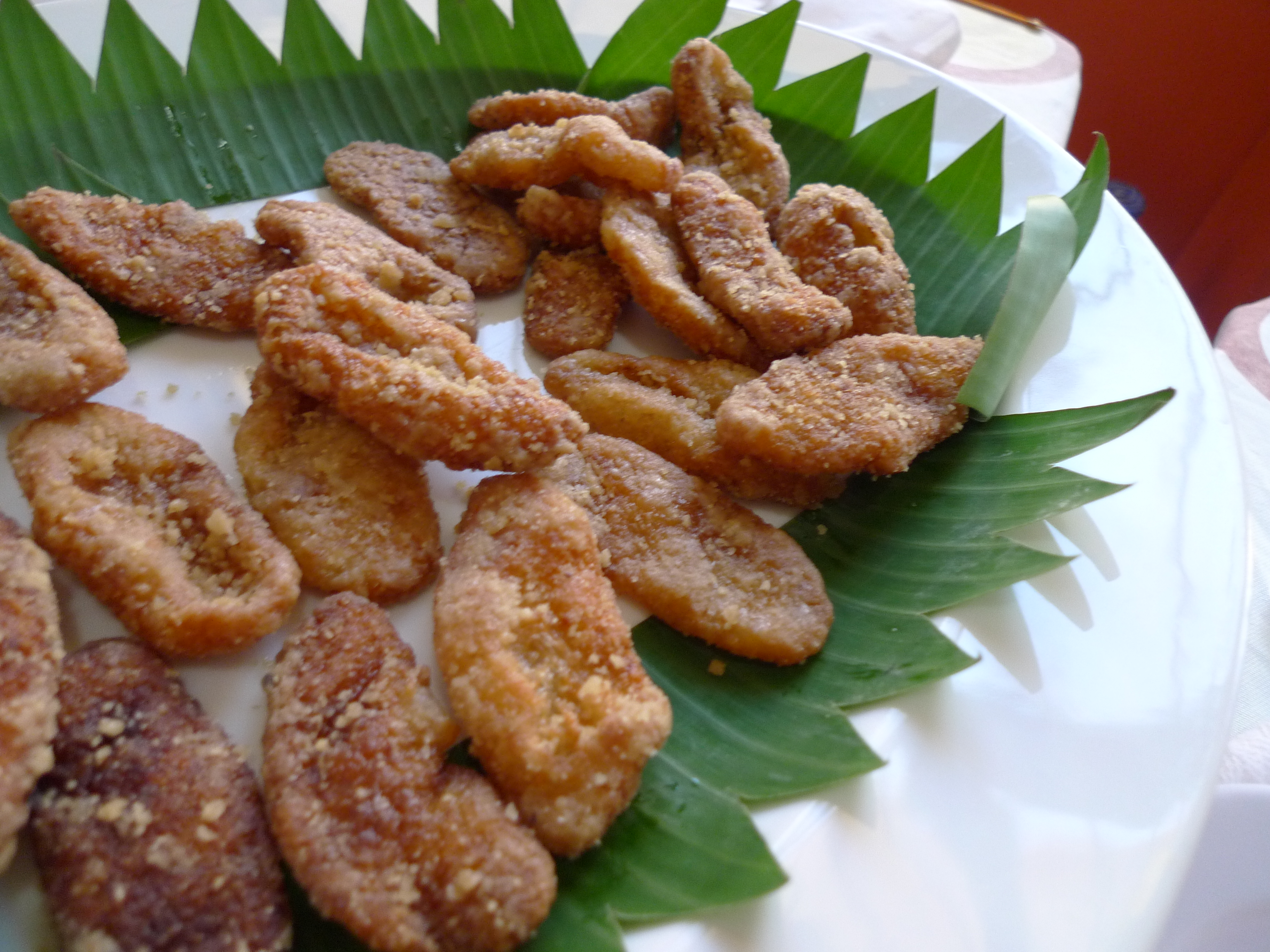
Pinakufu, a variant of cascaron doughnuts made with glutinous rice

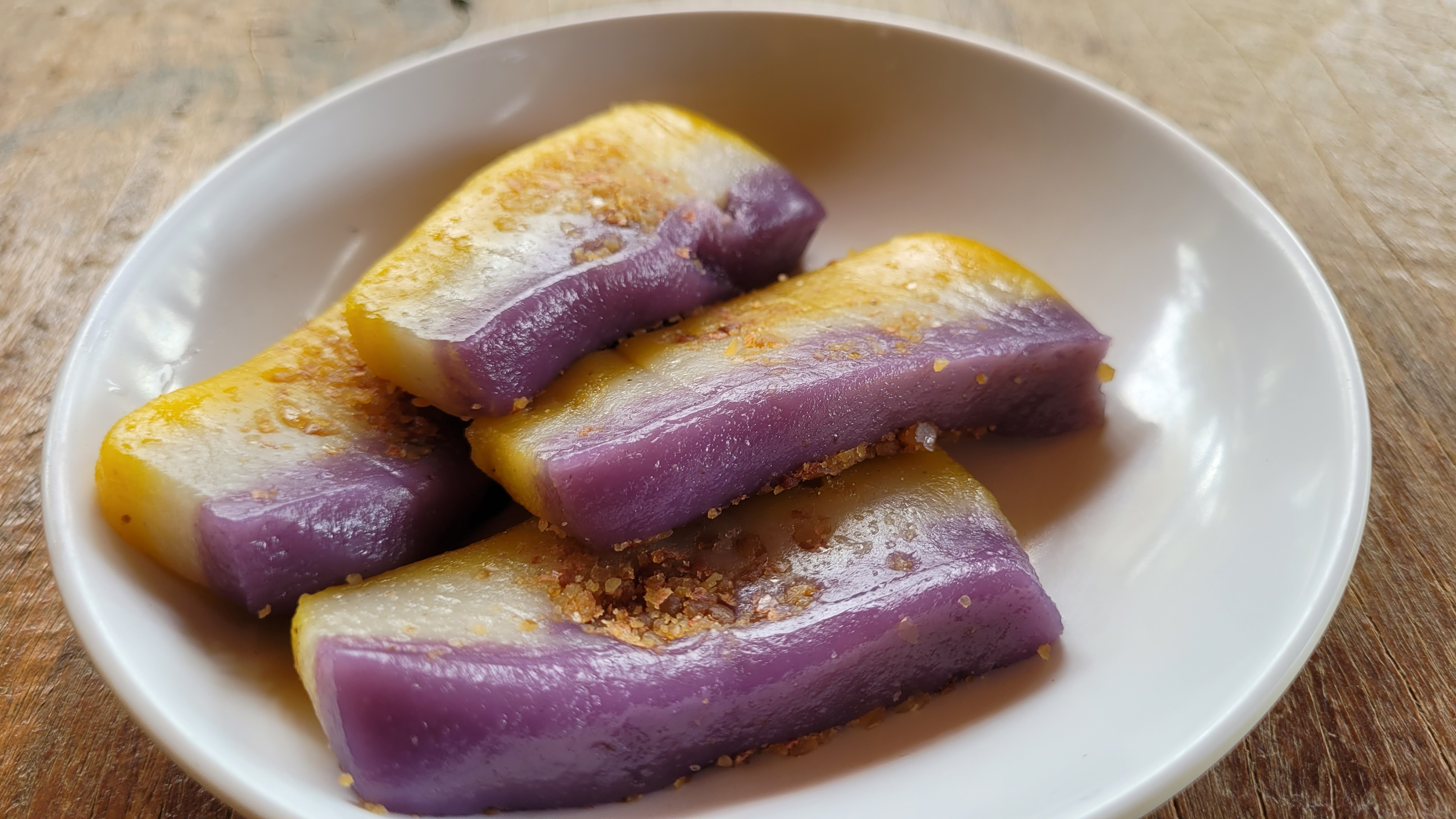
Sapin-sapin, a colourful dessert made with multiple layers of glutinous rice, each with a different flavour and texture

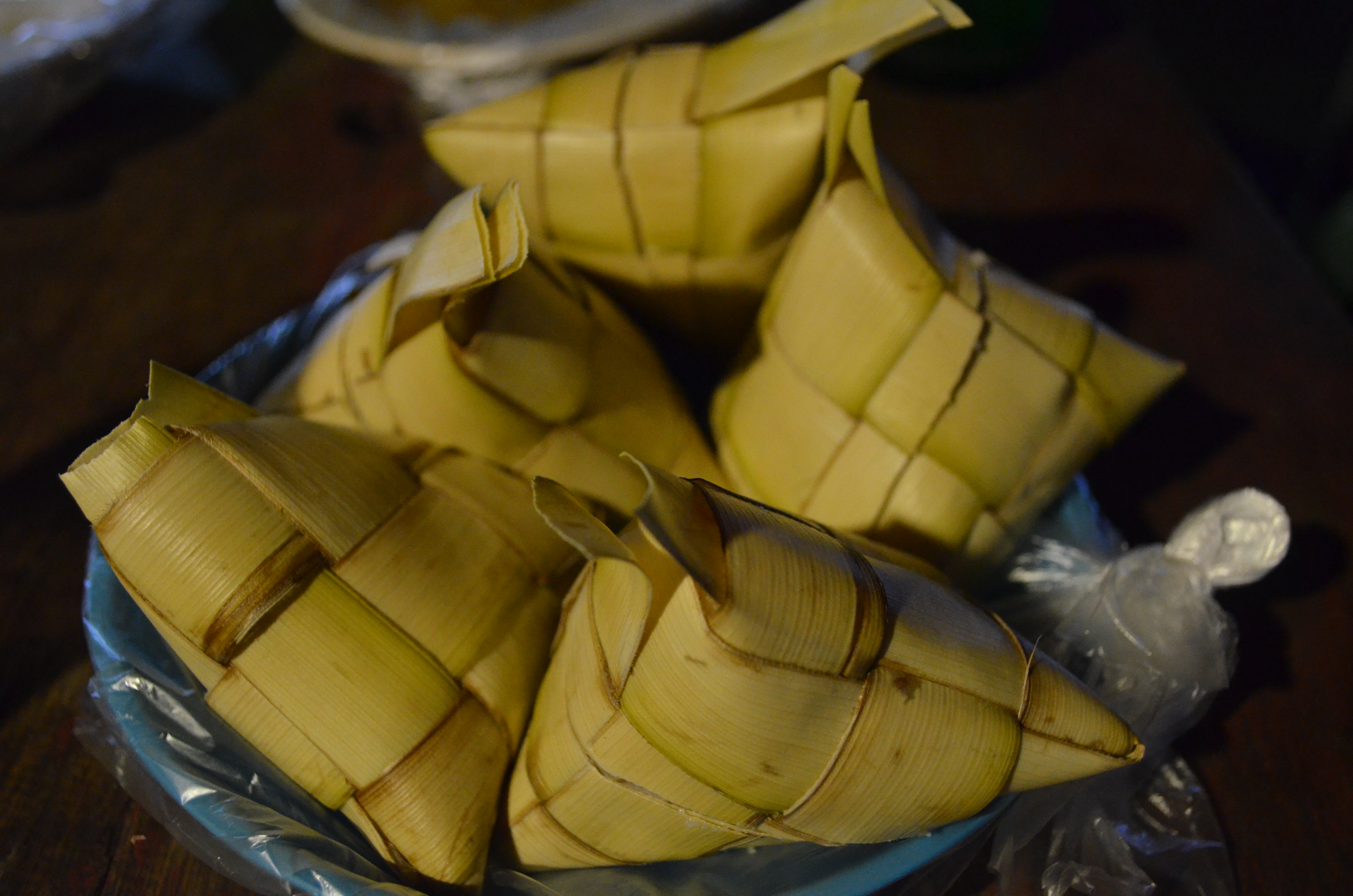
Pusô, made from glutinous rice cooked in pouches of woven coconut leaves

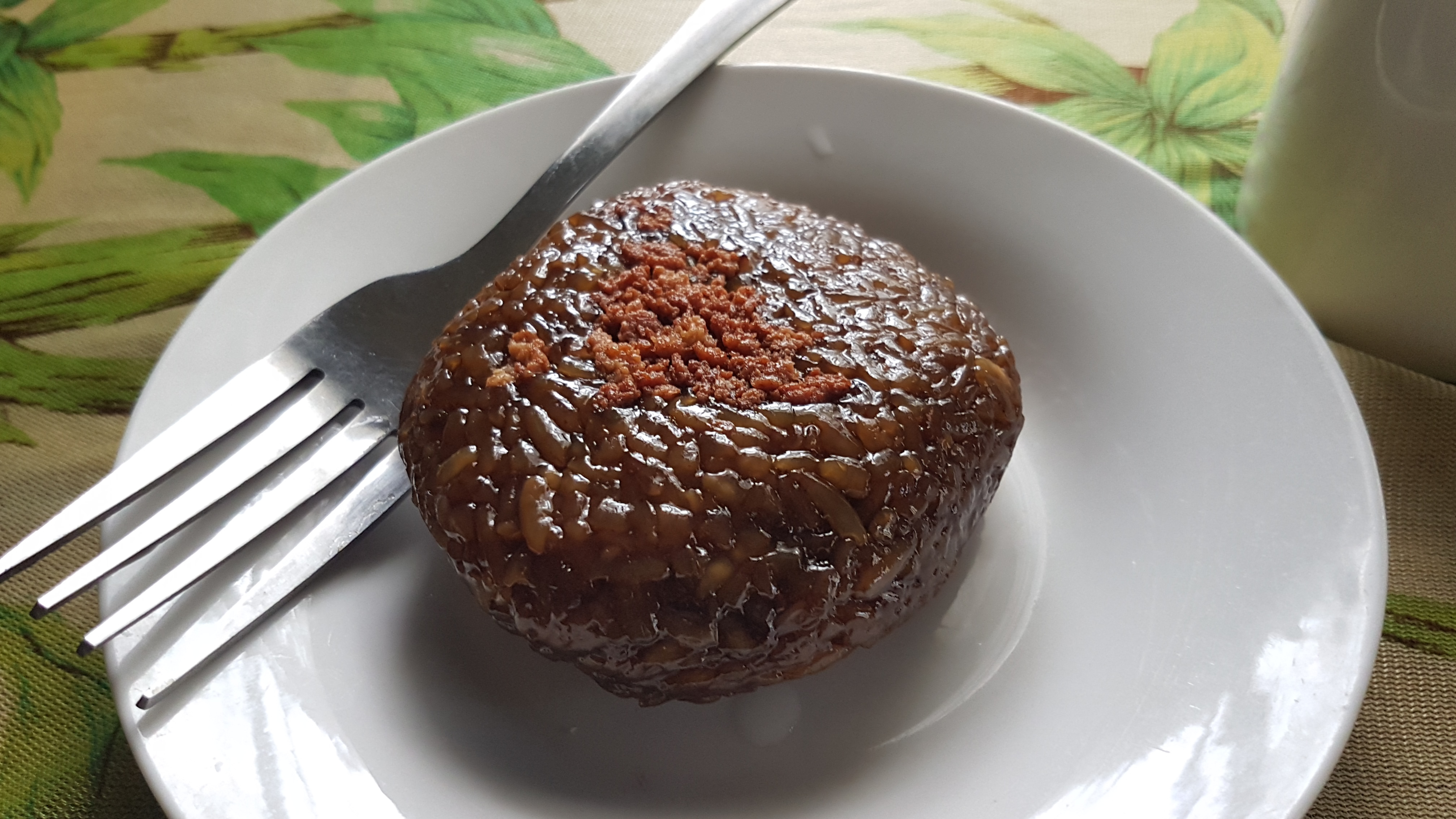
Puto maya made with pirurutong rice

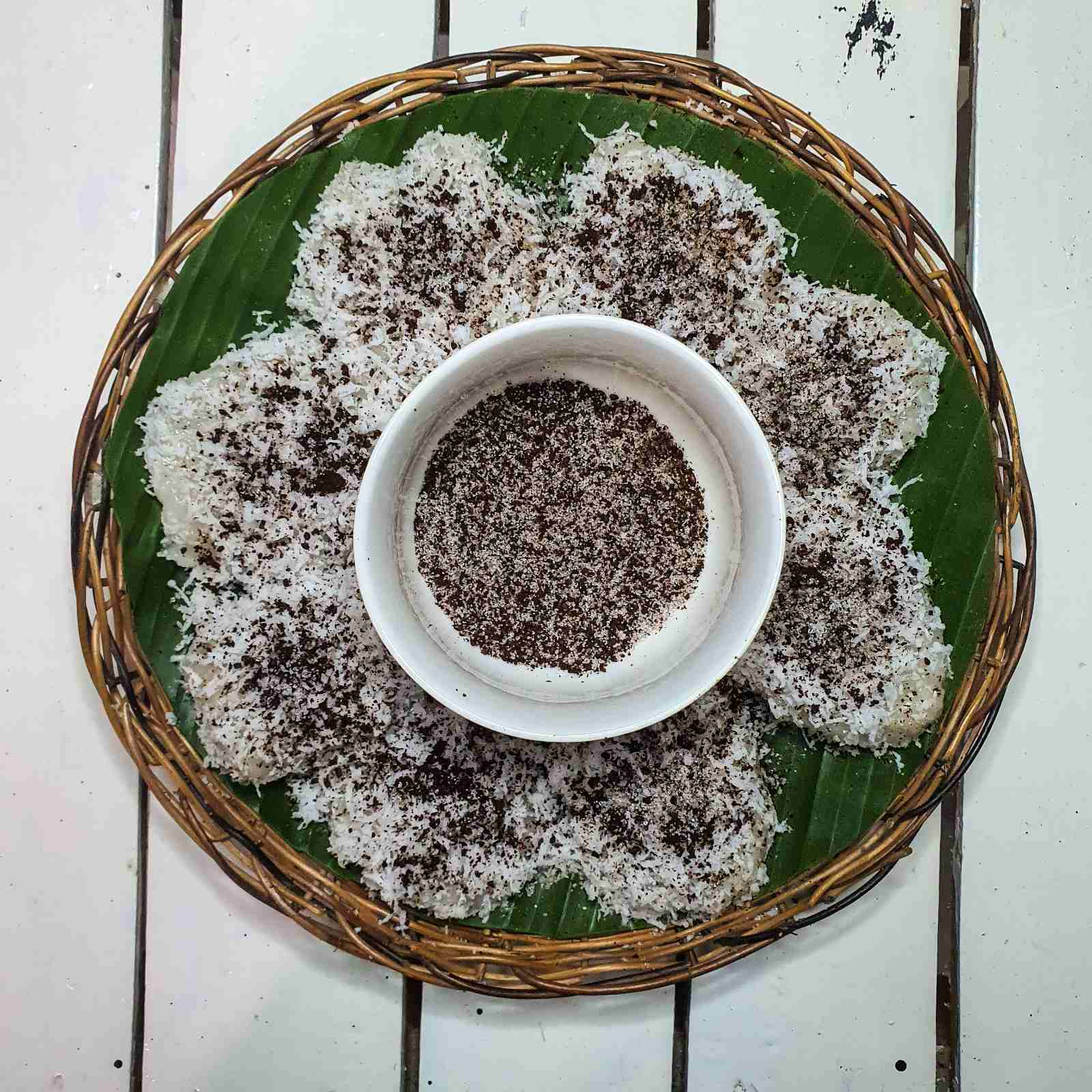
Palitaw, made from galapong, grated coconut, mix of sugar and toasted sesame seeds

=== Thailand ===
In Thailand, glutinous rice is known as khao niao (Thai: ข้าวเหนียว; lit. 'sticky rice') in central Thailand and Isan, and as khao nueng (Thai: ข้าวนึ่ง; lit. 'steamed rice') in northern Thailand. Sticky rice at the table is typically served individually in a small woven basket (Thai: กระติบข้าว, RTGS: kratip khao).

- Steamed glutinous rice is one of the main ingredients in making the sour-fermented pork skinless sausage called naem, or its northern Thai equivalent chin som, which can be made from pork, beef, or water buffalo meat. It is also essential for the fermentation process in the northeastern Thai sausage called sai krok Isan. This latter sausage is made, in contrast to the first two, with a sausage casing.
- Sweets and desserts: Famous among tourists in Thailand is khao niao mamuang (Thai: ข้าวเหนียวมะม่วง): sweet coconut sticky rice with mango, while khao niao tat, sweet sticky rice with coconut cream and black beans, Khao niao na krachik (Thai: ข้าวเหนียวหน้ากระฉีก), sweet sticky rice topped with caramelized roasted grated coconut, khao niao kaeo, sticky rice cooked in coconut milk and sugar and khao tom hua ngok, sticky rice steamed with banana with grated coconut and sugar, are traditional popular desserts.
- Khao lam (Thai: ข้าวหลาม) is sticky rice with sugar and coconut cream cooked in specially prepared bamboo sections of different diameters and lengths. It can be prepared with white or dark purple (khao niao dam) varieties of glutinous rice. Sometimes a few beans or nuts are added and mixed in. Thick khao lam containers may have a custard-like filling in the centre made with coconut cream, egg and sugar.
- Khao chi (Thai: ข้าวจี่) are cakes of sticky rice having the size and shape of a patty and a crunchy crust. In order to prepare them, the glutinous rice is laced with salt, often also lightly coated with beaten egg, and grilled over a charcoal fire. They were traditionally made with leftover rice and given in the early morning to the children, or to passing monks as an offering.
- Khao niew tua dum is a sticky with sugar, thickened coconut milk and black beans.
- Khao pong (Thai: ข้าวโป่ง) is a crunchy preparation made of leftover steamed glutinous rice that is pounded and pressed into thin sheets before being grilled.
- Khao tom mat (Thai: ข้าวต้มมัด), cooked sticky rice mixed with banana and wrapped in banana leaf, khao ho, sticky rice moulded and wrapped in a conical shape, khao pradap din, kraya sat and khao thip are preparations based on glutinous rice used as offerings in religious festivals and ceremonies for merit-making or warding off evil spirits.
- Khao niao ping (Thai: ข้าวเหนียวปิ้ง), sticky rice mixed with coconut milk and taro (khao niao ping pheuak), banana (khao niao ping kluai) or black beans (khao niao ping tua), wrapped in banana leaf and grilled slowly over a charcoal fire. Glutinous rice is traditionally eaten using the right hand
- Khao khua (Thai: ข้าวคั่ว), roasted ground glutinous rice, is indispensable for making the northeastern Thai dishes larb, nam tok, and nam chim chaeo. Some recipes also ask for khao khua in certain northern Thai curries. It imparts a nutty flavour to the dishes in which it is used.
- Naem khluk (Thai: ยำแหนม) or yam naem khao thot is a salad made from crumbled deep-fried, curried-rice croquettes, and naem sausage
- Chin som mok is a northern Thai speciality made with grilled, banana leaf-wrapped pork skin that has been fermented with glutinous rice
- Sai krok Isan: grilled, fermented pork sausages, a speciality of northeastern Thailand
- Glutinous rice is also used as the basis for the brewing of sato (Thai: สาโท), an alcoholic beverage also known as "Thai rice wine".
Thai glutinous rice dishes

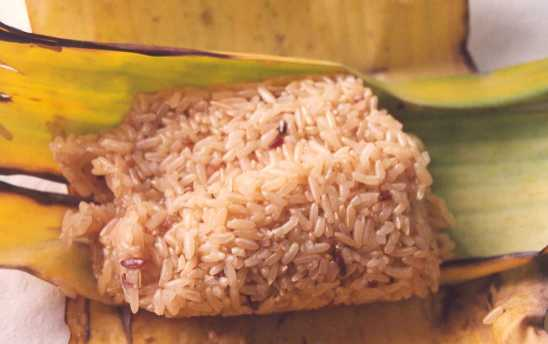
A packet of glutinous rice in a traditional Isan banana-leaf wrapper

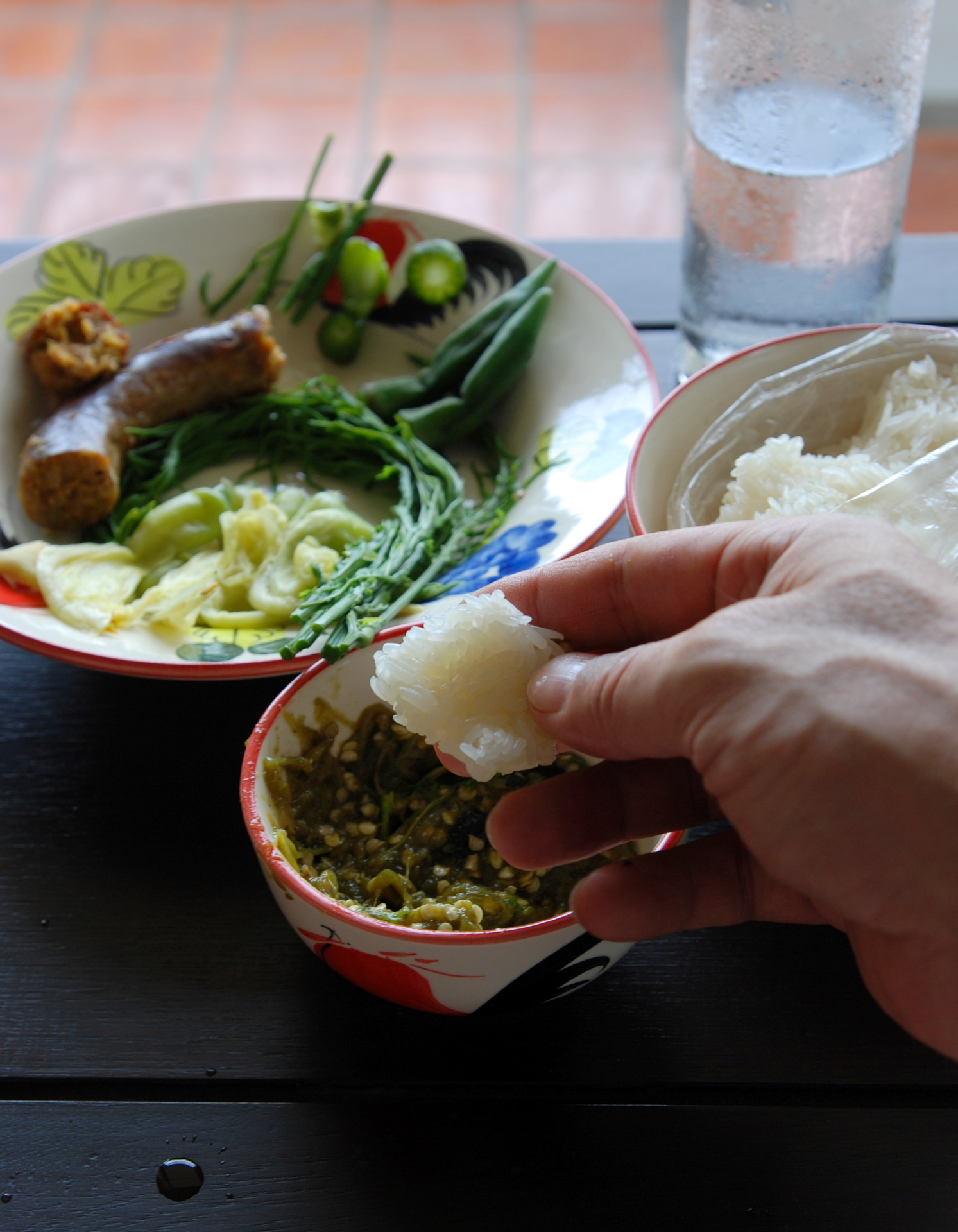
Kin khao niao

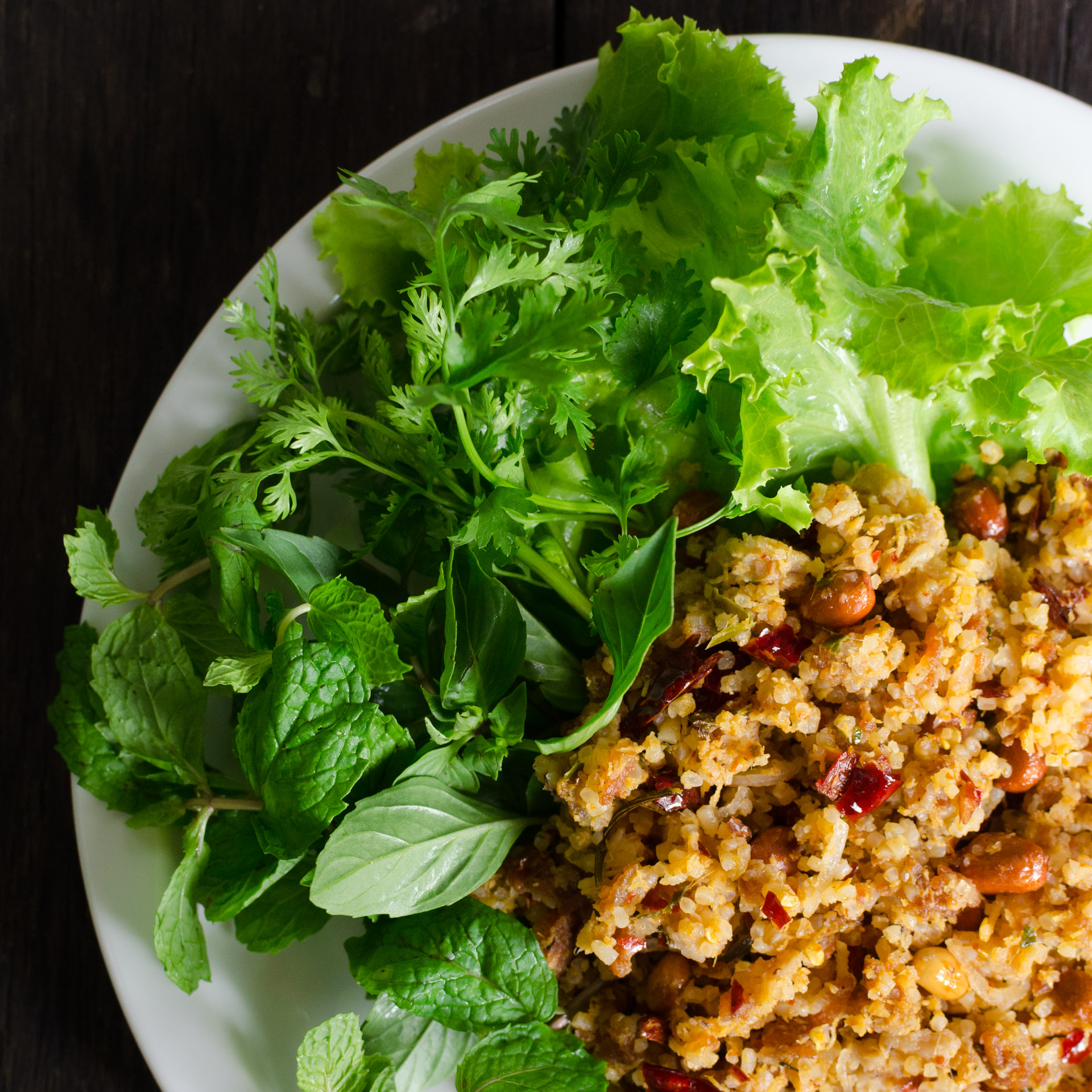
Naem khluk or yam naem khao thot

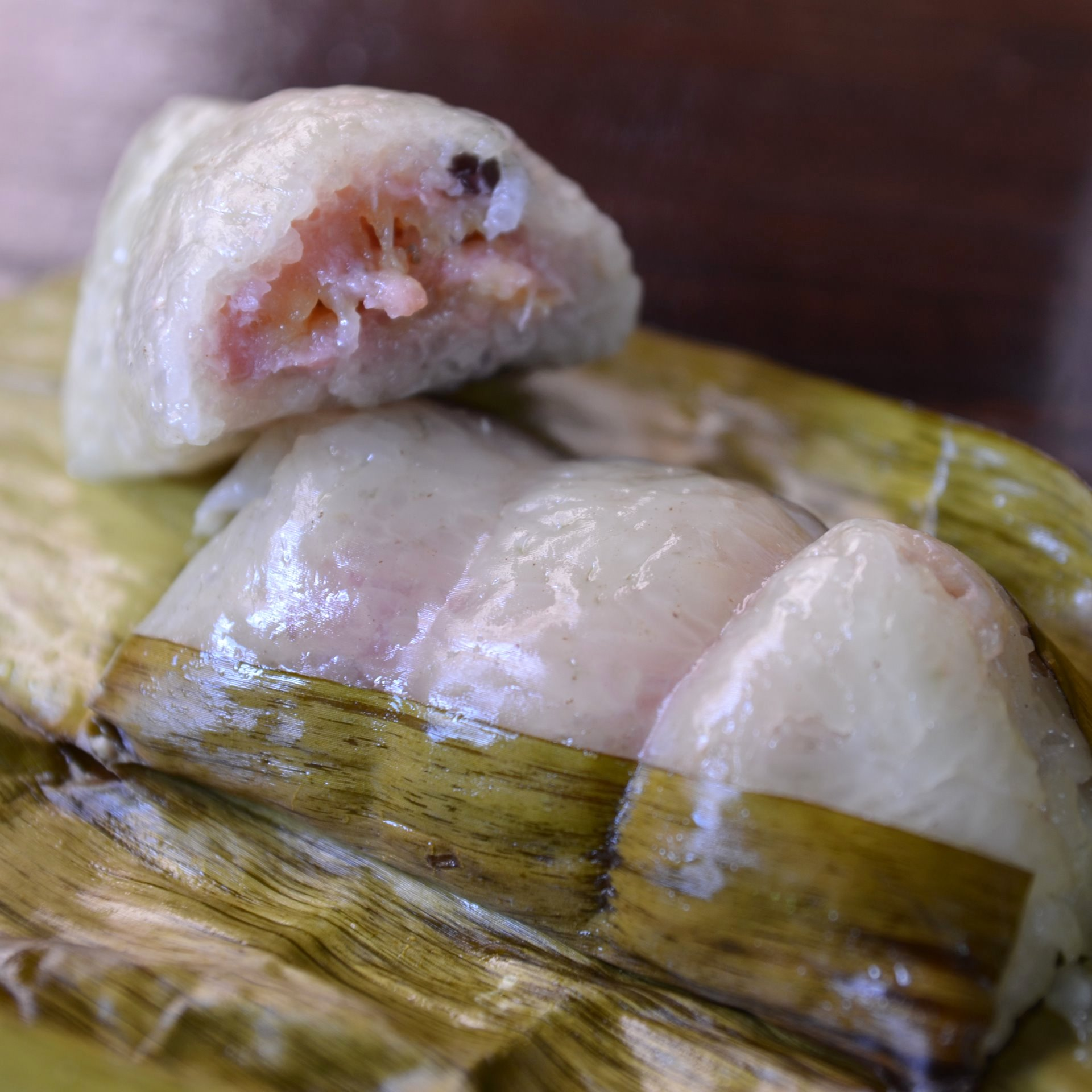
Khao tom mat, sticky rice and banana steamed inside a banana leaf

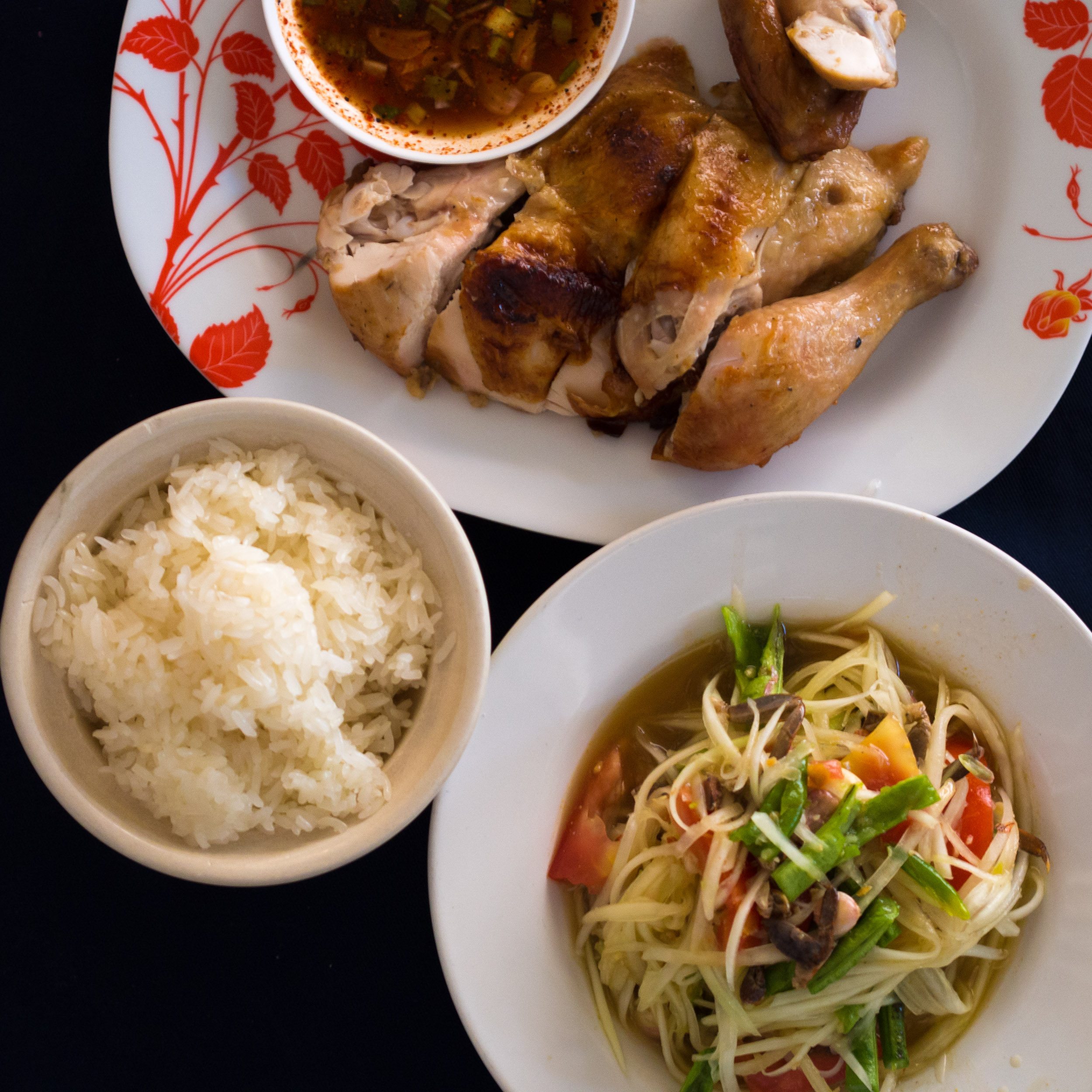
Som tam (papaya salad), khao niao (sticky rice) and kai yang (grilled chicken)

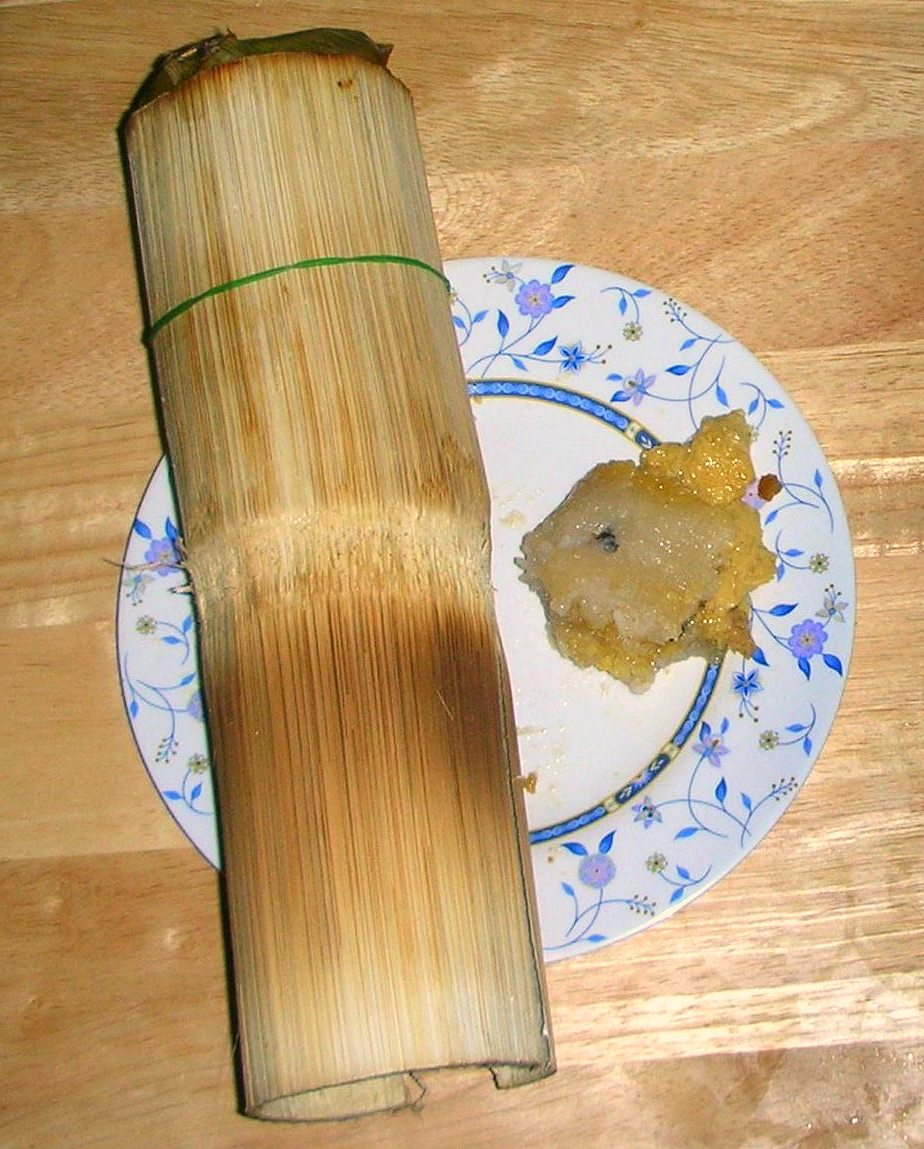
Khao lam in a section of bamboo

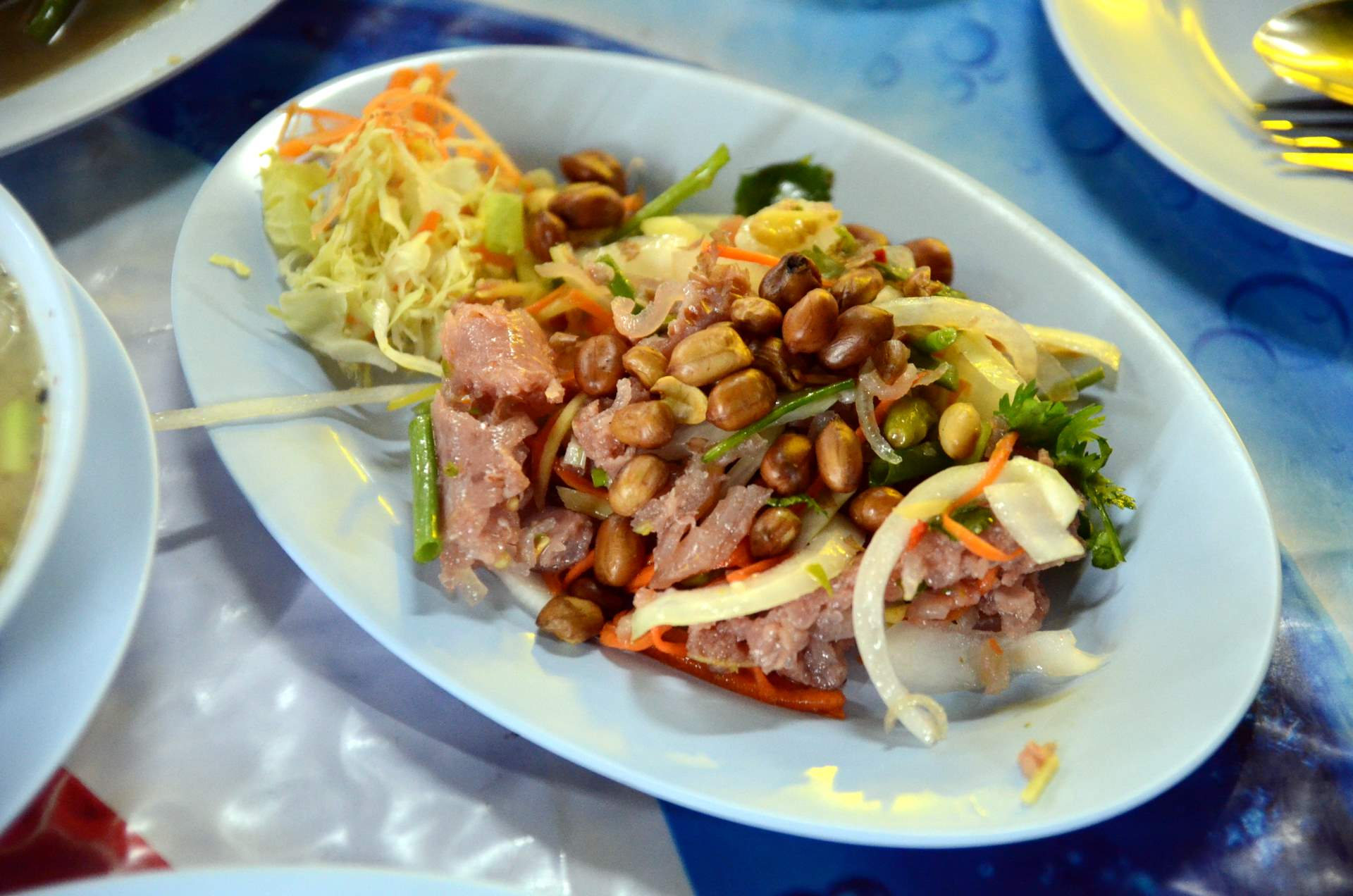
Yam naem, a salad with naem sausage made from raw pork fermented with glutinous rice

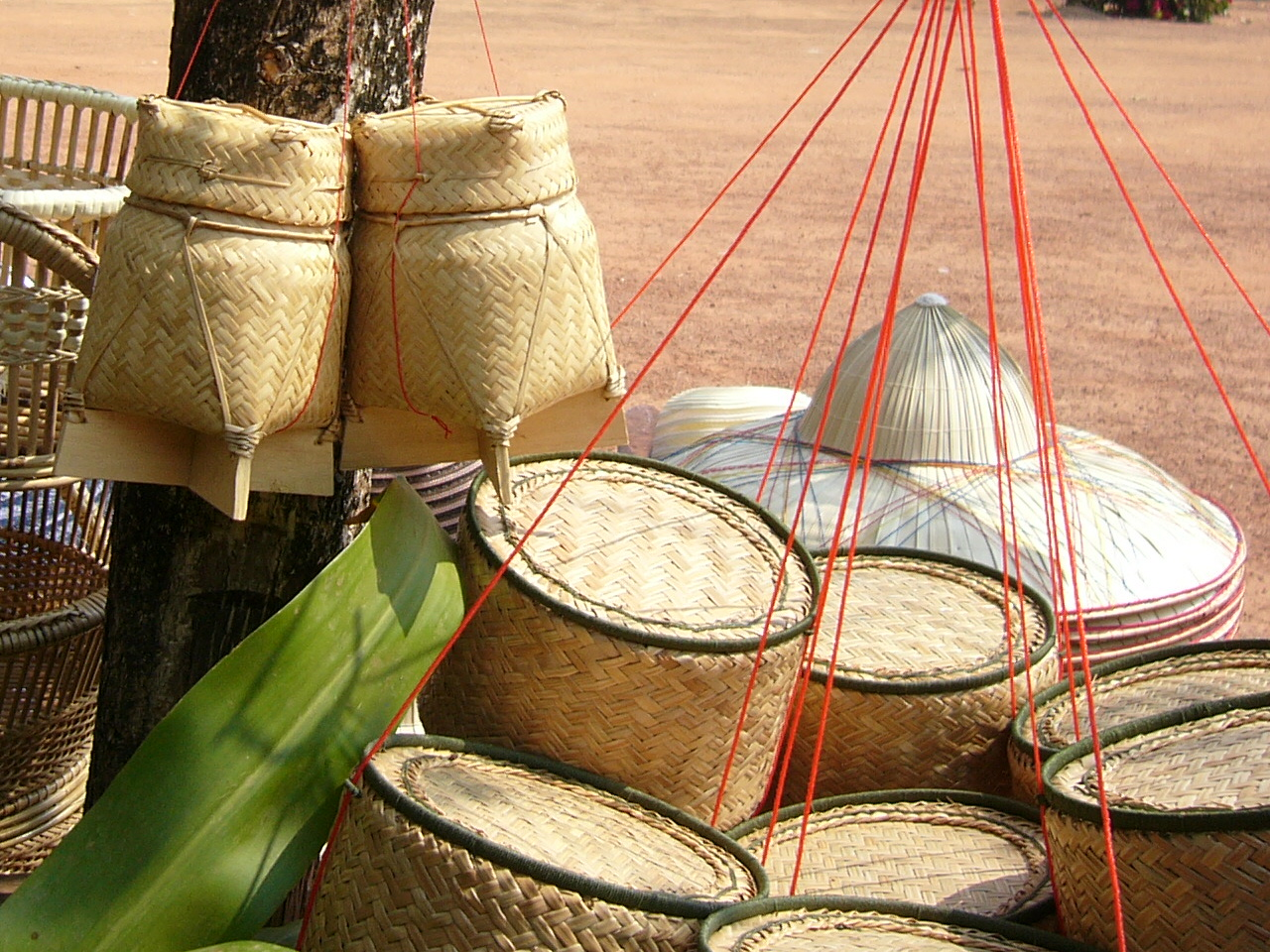
Kratip (Thai: กระติบ) are used by northern and northeastern Thais as containers for sticky rice

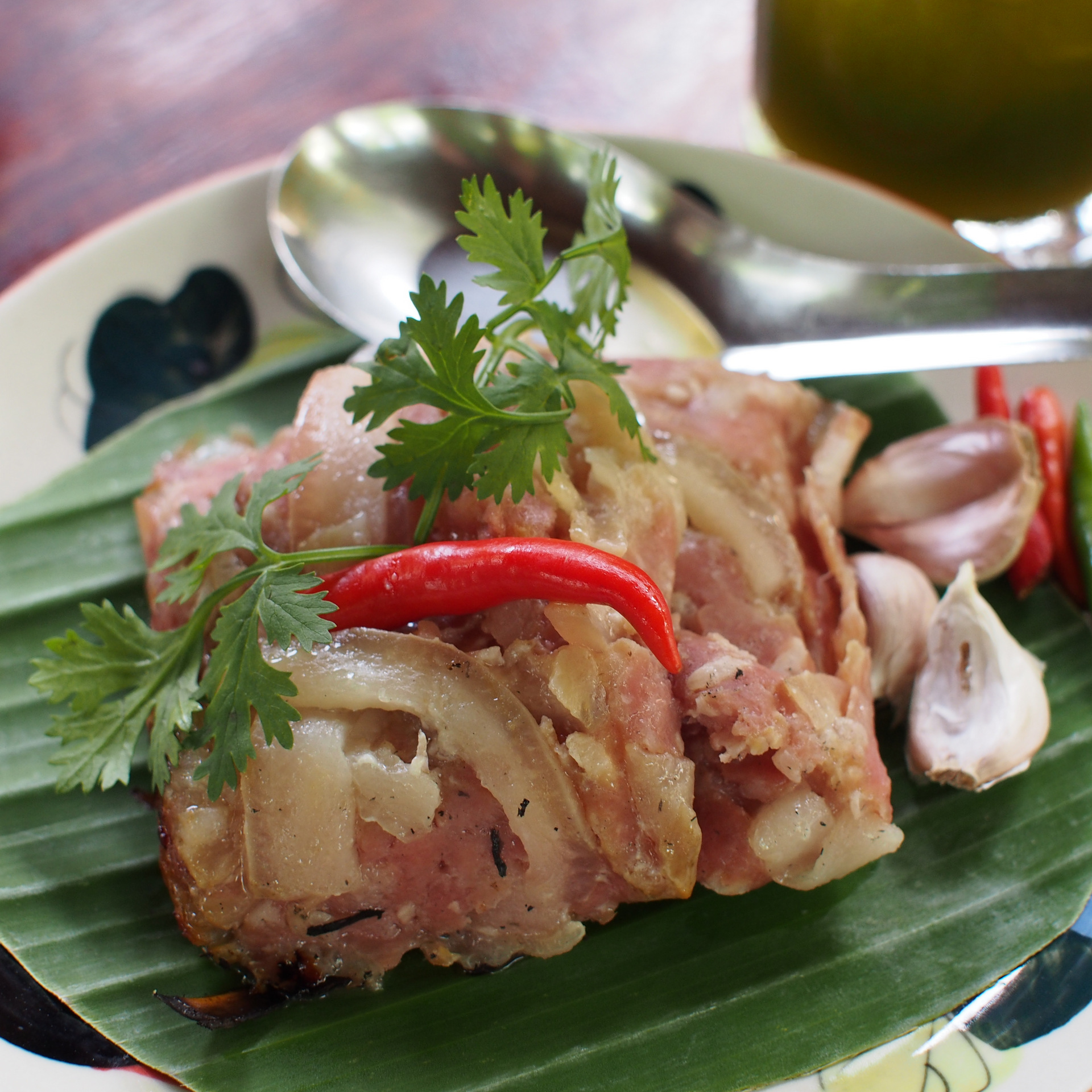
Chin som mok, northern Thai speciality, grilled pork skin fermented with glutinous rice

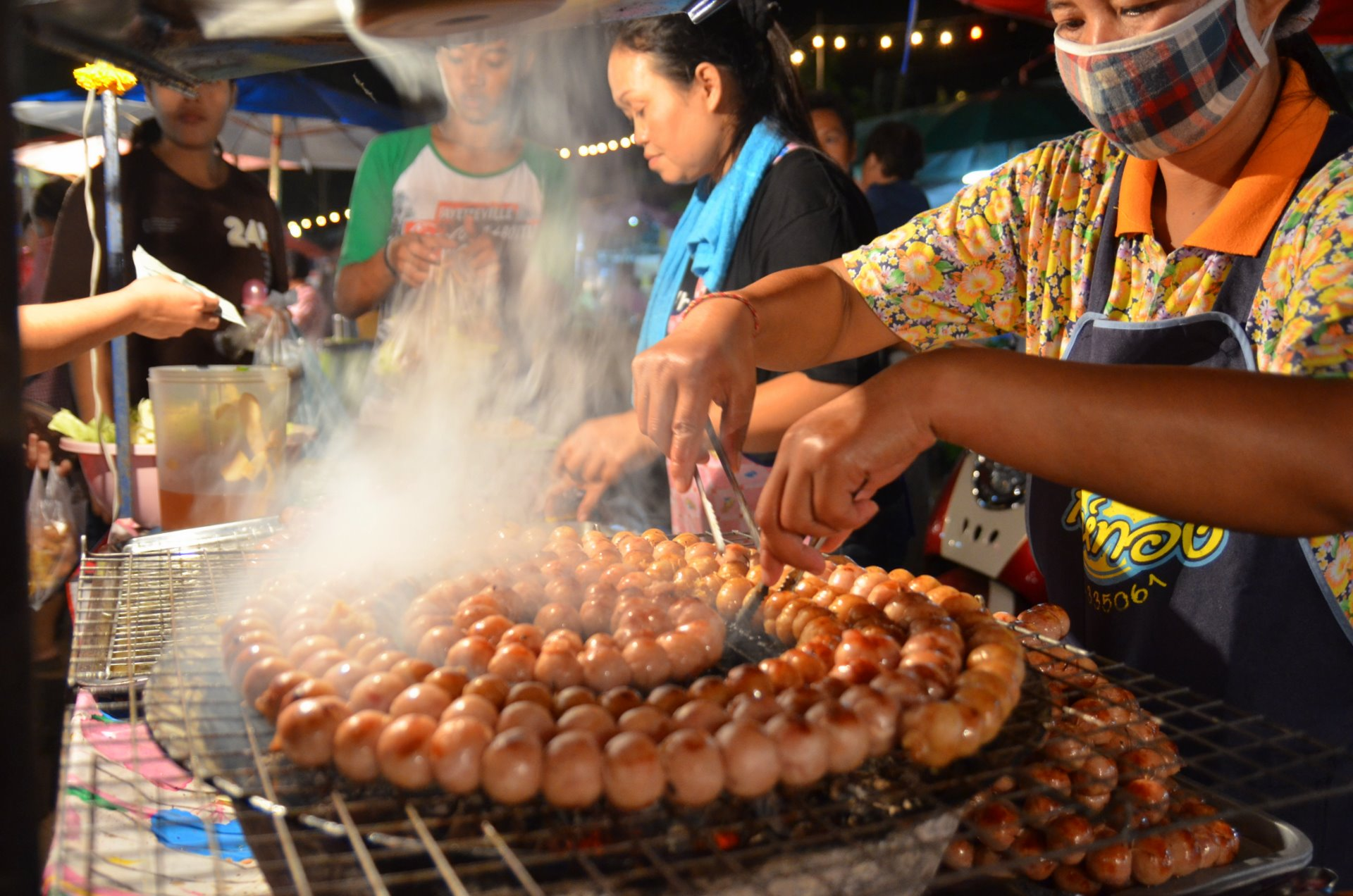
Sai krok Isan specialty of northeastern Thailand

=== Vietnam ===
Glutinous rice is called gạo nếp in Vietnamese. The term for the cooked rice is called xôi. Dishes made from glutinous rice in Vietnam are typically served as desserts or side dishes, but some can be served as main dishes. There is a wide array of glutinous rice dishes in Vietnamese cuisine, the majority of them can be categorized as follows:

- Bánh, the most diverse category, refers to a wide variety of sweet or savoury, distinct cakes, buns, pastries, sandwiches, and food items from Vietnamese cuisine, which may be cooked by steaming, baking, frying, deep-frying, or boiling. Some, but not all bánh are made from glutinous rice. They can also be made from ordinary rice flour, cassava flour, taro flour, or tapioca starch. The word "bánh" is also used to refer to certain varieties of noodles in Vietnam, and absolutely not to be confused with glutinous rice dishes. Some bánh dishes that are made from glutinous rice include:
  - Bánh chưng: a square-shaped, boiled glutinous rice dumpling filled with pork and mung bean paste, wrapped in a dong leaf, usually eaten in Vietnamese New Year.
  - Bánh giầy: white, flat, round glutinous rice cake with a tough, chewy texture filled with mung bean or served with Vietnamese sausage (chả), usually eaten during Vietnamese New Year with bánh chưng.
  - Bánh dừa: glutinous rice mixed with black bean paste cooked in coconut juice, wrapped in a coconut leaf. The filling can be mung bean stir-fried in coconut juice or banana.
  - Bánh rán: a northern Vietnamese dish of deep-fried glutinous rice balls covered with sesame, scented with a jasmine flower essence, filled with either sweetened mung bean paste (the sweet version) or chopped meat and mushrooms (the savoury version).
  - Bánh cam: a southern Vietnamese version of bánh rán. Unlike bánh rán, bánh cam is coated with a layer of sugary liquid and has no jasmine essence.
  - Bánh trôi: made from glutinous rice mixed with a small portion of ordinary rice flour (the ratio of glutinous rice flour to ordinary rice flour is typically 9:1 or 8:2) filled with sugarcane rock candy.
  - Bánh gai: made from the leaves of the "gai" tree (Boehmeria nivea) dried, boiled, ground into small pieces, then mixed with glutinous rice, wrapped in banana leaf. The filling is made from a mixture of coconut, mung bean, peanuts, winter melon, sesame, and lotus seeds.
  - Bánh cốm: the cake is made from young glutinous rice seeds. The seeds are put into a water pot, stirred on fire, and juice extracted from the pomelo flower is added. The filling is made from steamed mung bean, scraped coconut, sweetened pumpkin, and sweetened lotus seeds.
  - Other bánh made from glutinous rice are bánh tro, bánh tét, bánh ú, bánh măng, bánh ít, bánh khúc, bánh tổ, bánh in, bánh dẻo, bánh su sê, bánh nổ...
- Xôi are sweet or savoury dishes made from steamed glutinous rice and other ingredients. Sweet xôi are typically eaten as breakfast. Savoury xôi can be eaten as lunch. Xôi dishes made from glutinous rice include:
  - Xôi lá cẩm: made from the magenta plant.
  - Xôi lá dứa: made from pandan leaf extract for the green colour and a distinctive pandan flavour.
  - Xôi gấc: made from gấc fruit for the red colour.
  - Xôi nếp than: made from black rice.
  - Xôi ngũ sắc: five colours xôi, is the traditional food of the Thái, Dao and Tày people.
  - Xôi chiên phồng: deep-fried glutinous rice patty
  - Xôi gà: made with coconut juice and pandan leaf served with fried or roasted chicken and sausage.
  - Xôi thập cẩm: made with dried shrimp, chicken, Chinese sausage, Vietnamese sausage (chả), peanuts, coconut, onion, fried garlic, and potentially other ingredients.
  - Other xôi dishes made from glutinous rice include xôi lạc, xôi bắp, xôi đậu xanh, xôi vò, xôi sắn, xôi sầu riêng, xôi khúc, xôi xéo, and xôi vị.
- Chè refers to any traditional Vietnamese sweetened soup or porridge. Though chè can be made using a wide variety of ingredients, some chè dishes made from glutinous rice include:
  - Chè đậu trắng: made from glutinous rice and black-eyed peas.
  - Chè con ong: made from glutinous rice, ginger root, honey, and molasses.
  - Chè cốm: made from young glutinous rice seeds, kudzu flour, and juice from the pomelo flower.
  - Chè xôi nước: balls made from mung bean paste in a shell made of glutinous rice flour; served in a thick clear or brown liquid made of water, sugar, and grated ginger root.
- Cơm nếp: glutinous rice that is cooked in the same way as ordinary rice, except that the water used is flavoured by adding salts or by using coconut juice, or soups from chicken broth or pork broth.
- Cơm rượu: Glutinous rice balls cooked and mixed with yeast, served in a small amount of rice wine.
- Cơm lam: Glutinous rice cooked in a tube of bamboo of the genus Neohouzeaua and often served with grilled pork or chicken.

Glutinous rice can also be fermented to make Vietnamese alcoholic beverages, such as rượu nếp, rượu cần and rượu đế.

Vietnamese glutinous rice dishes

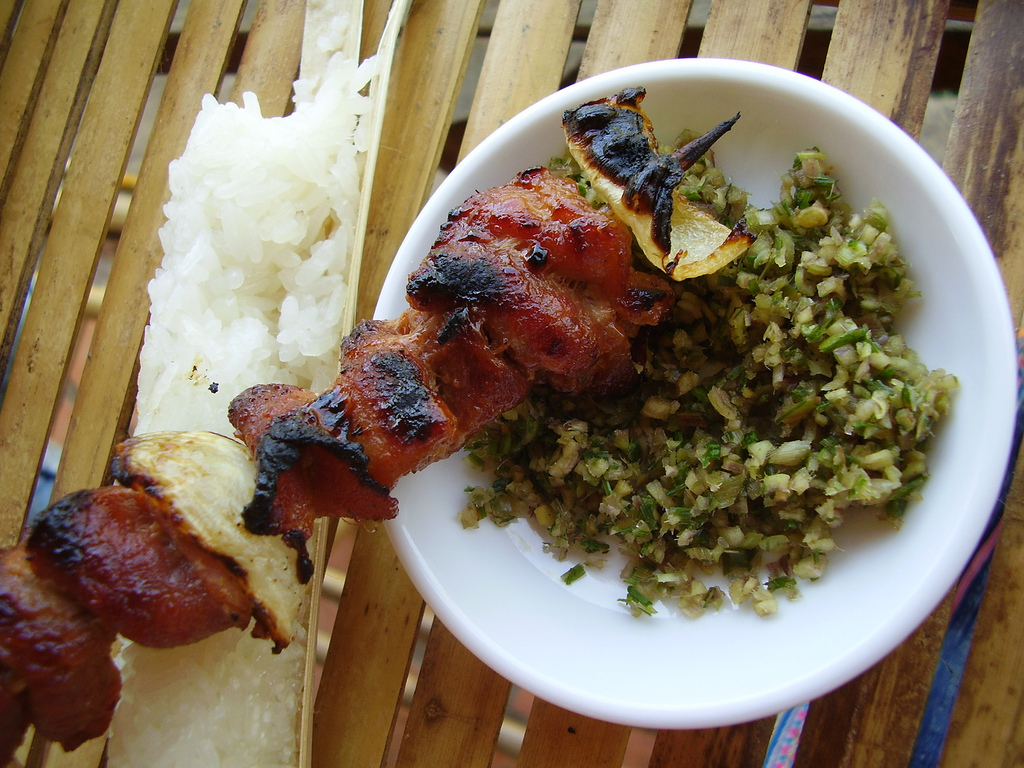
Cơm lam, rice cooked in a bamboo tube

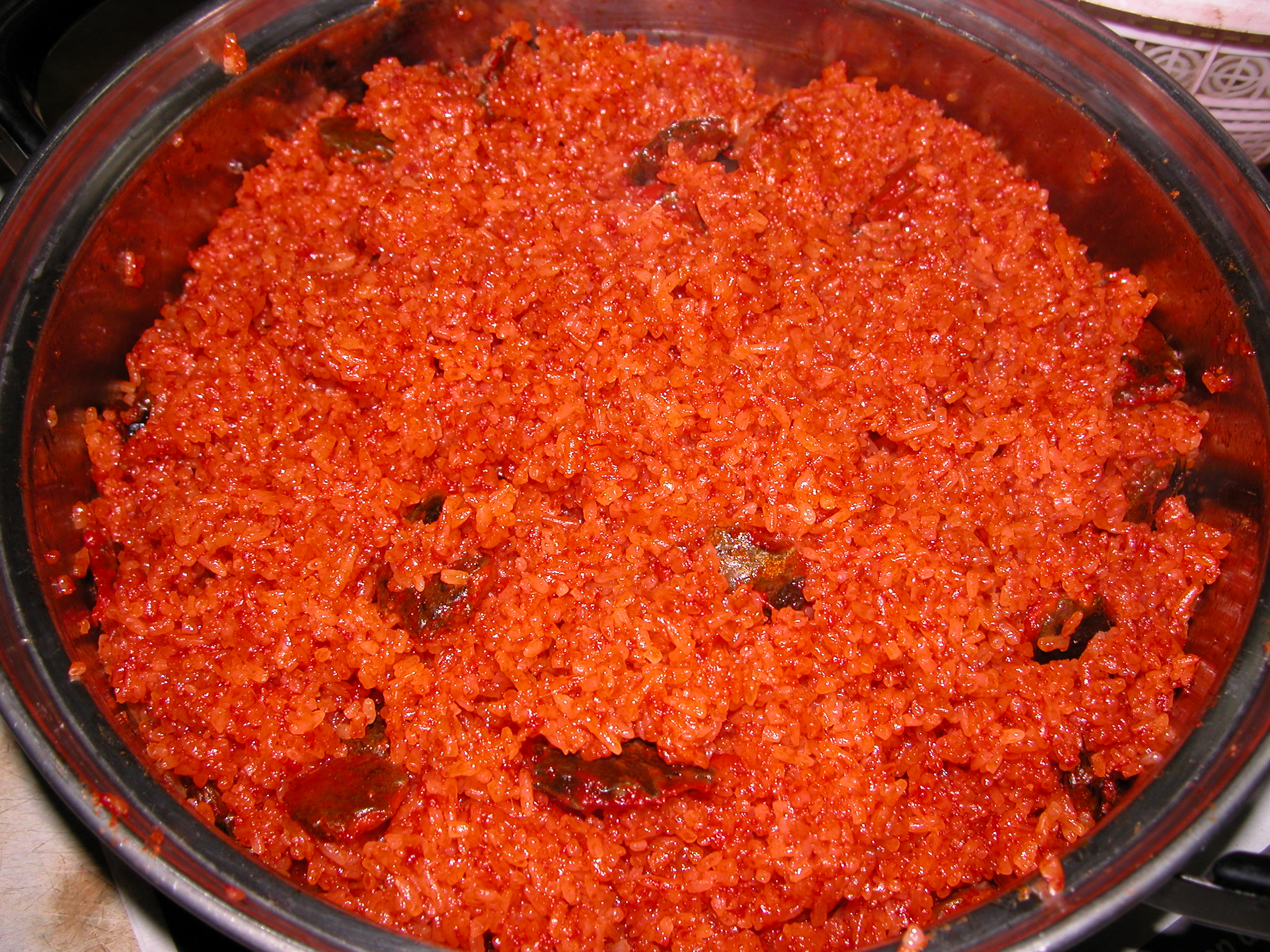
Xôi gấc, glutinous rice cooked with Gac fruit

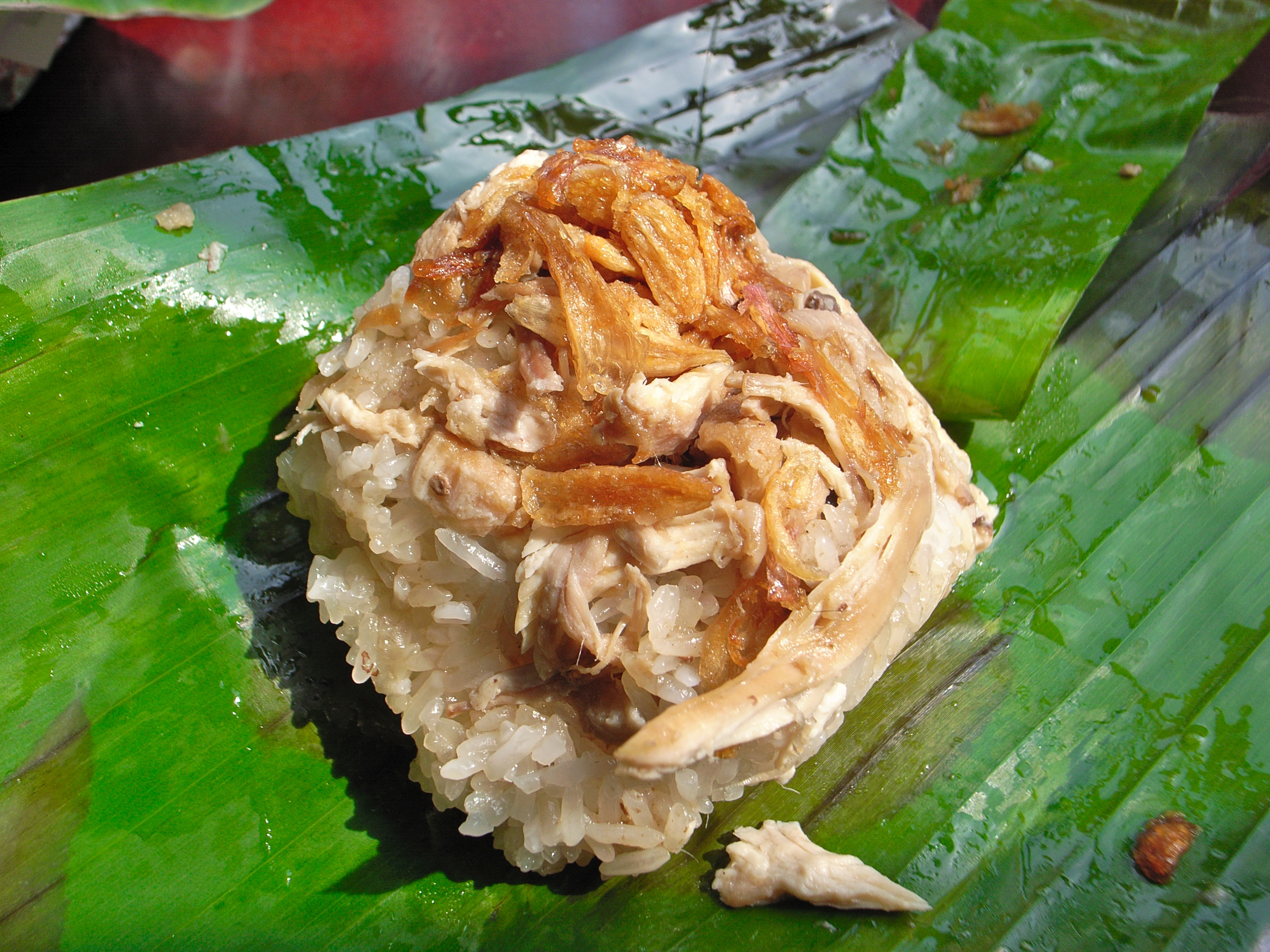
Xôi gà or chicken xôi

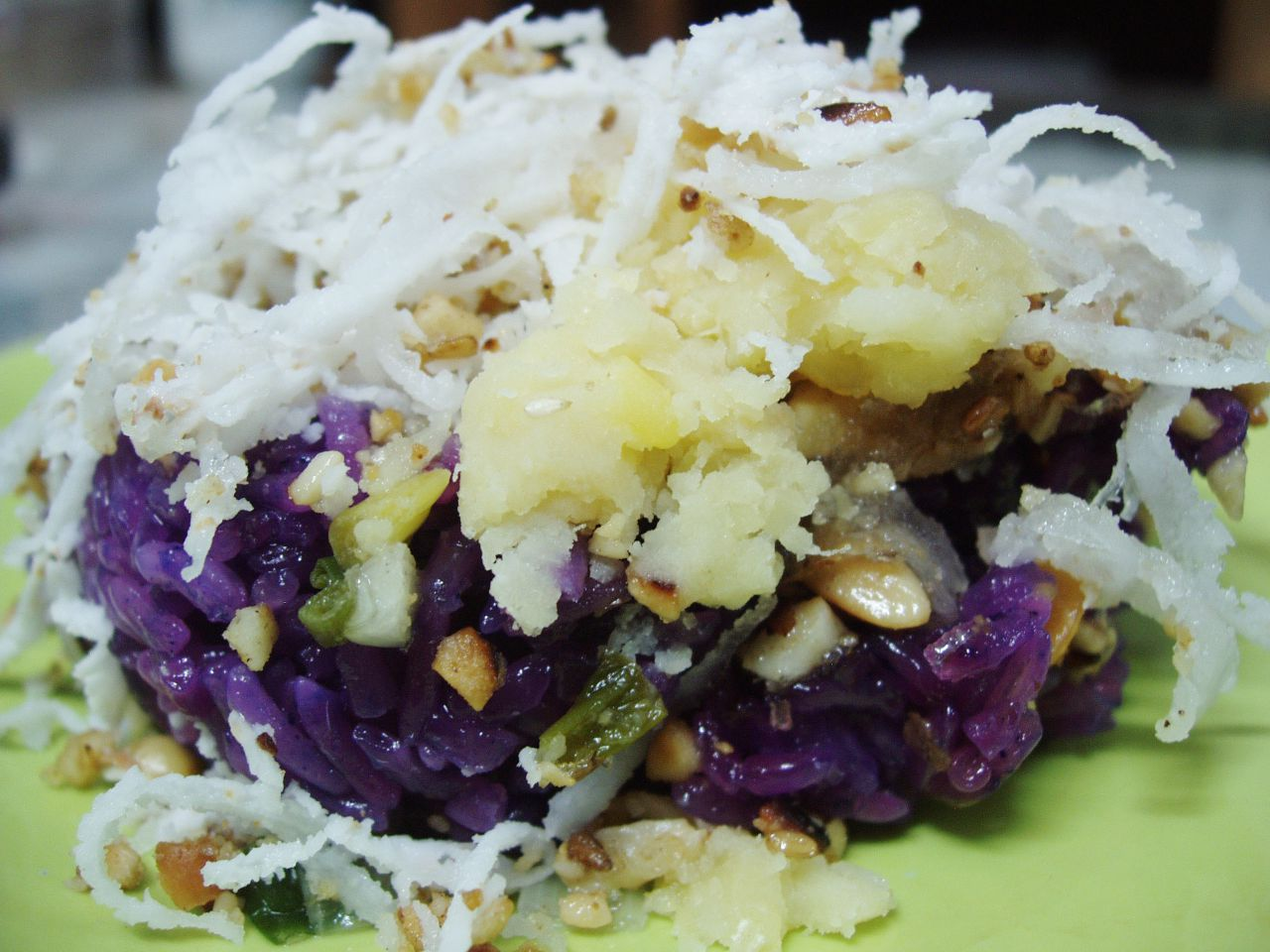
Xôi lá cẩm, sticky rice coloured with magenta leaves and shredded coconut

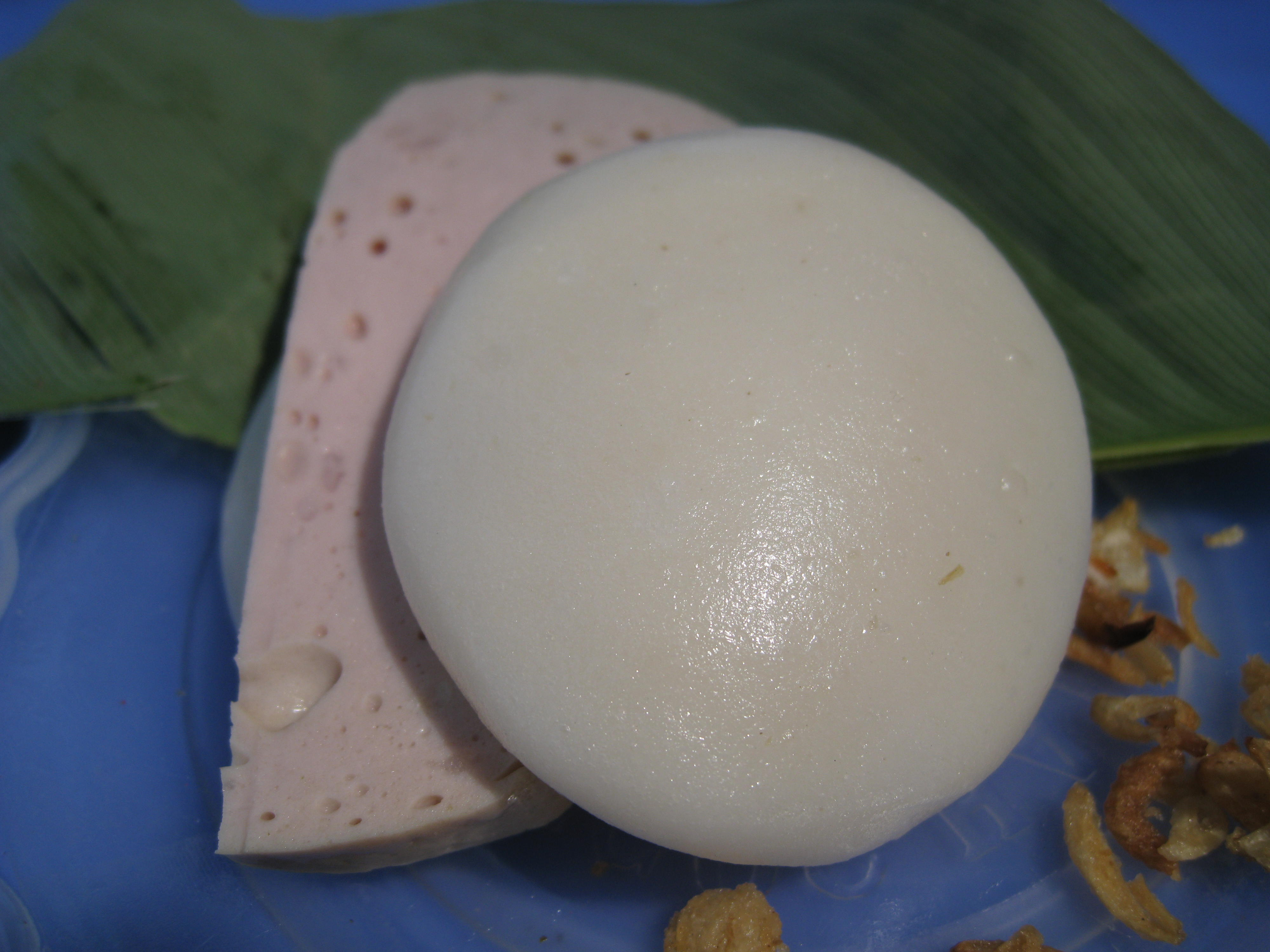
Bánh giầy, pounded rice cake

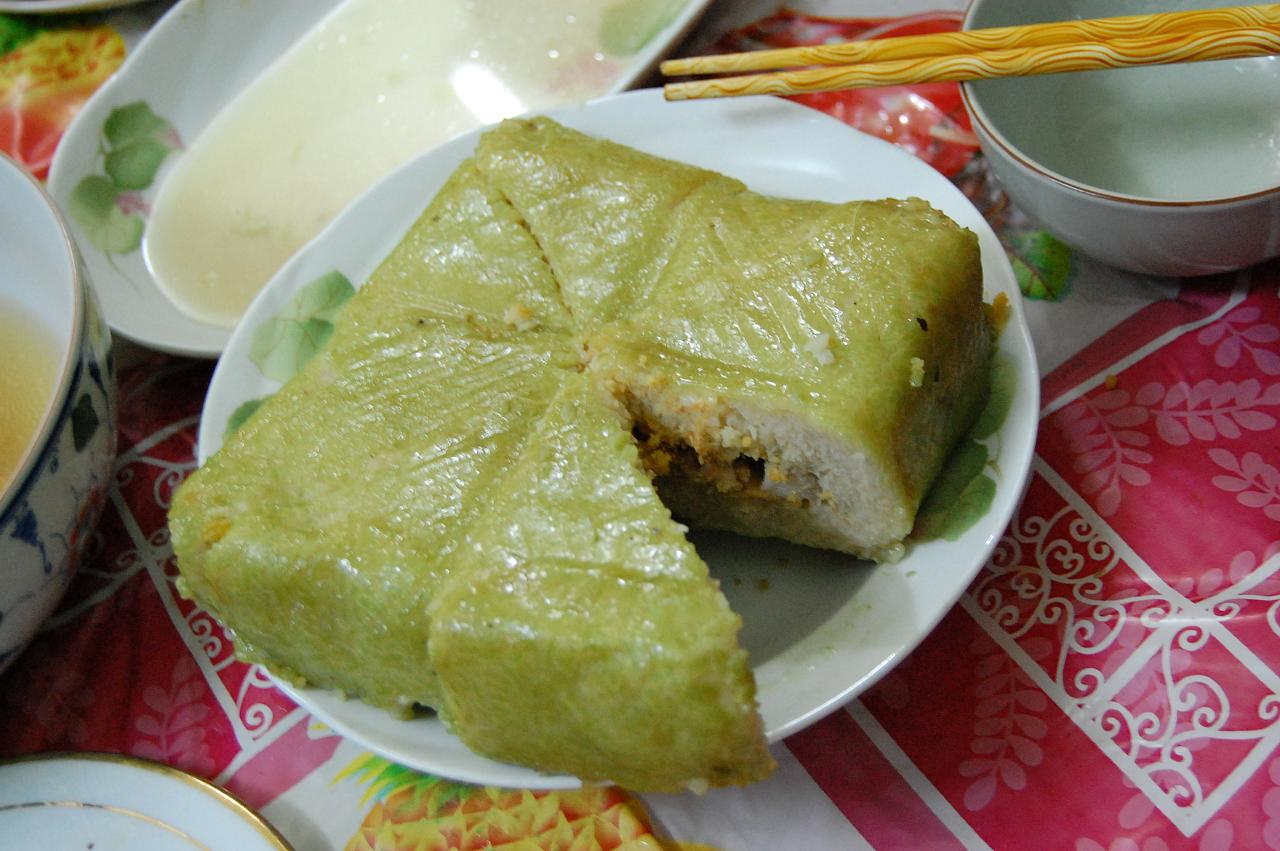
Bánh chưng a savoury rice cake with mung beans and pork fillings, usually consumed during Tết

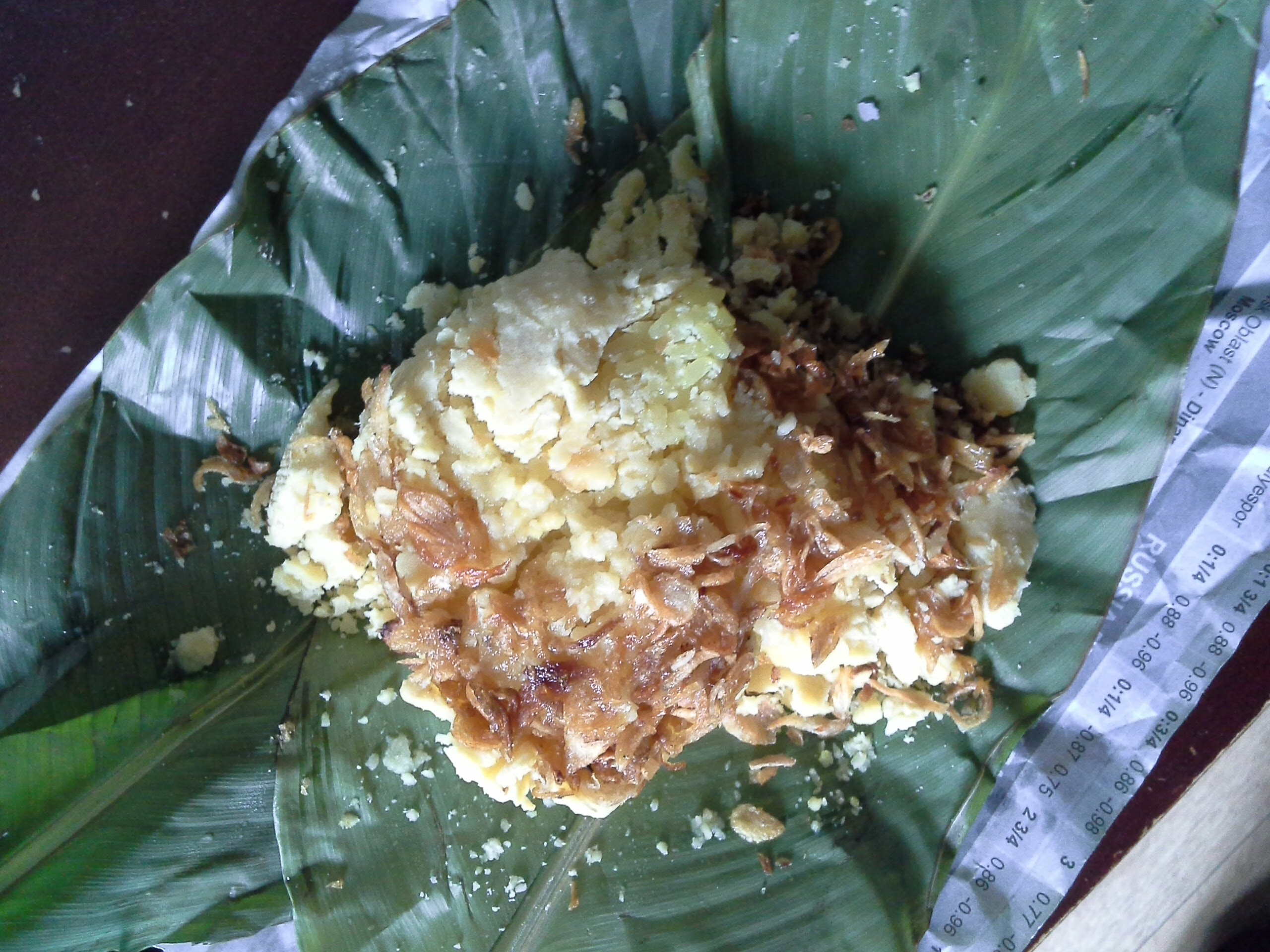
Xôi xéo, glutinous rice with mung beans and fried shallots

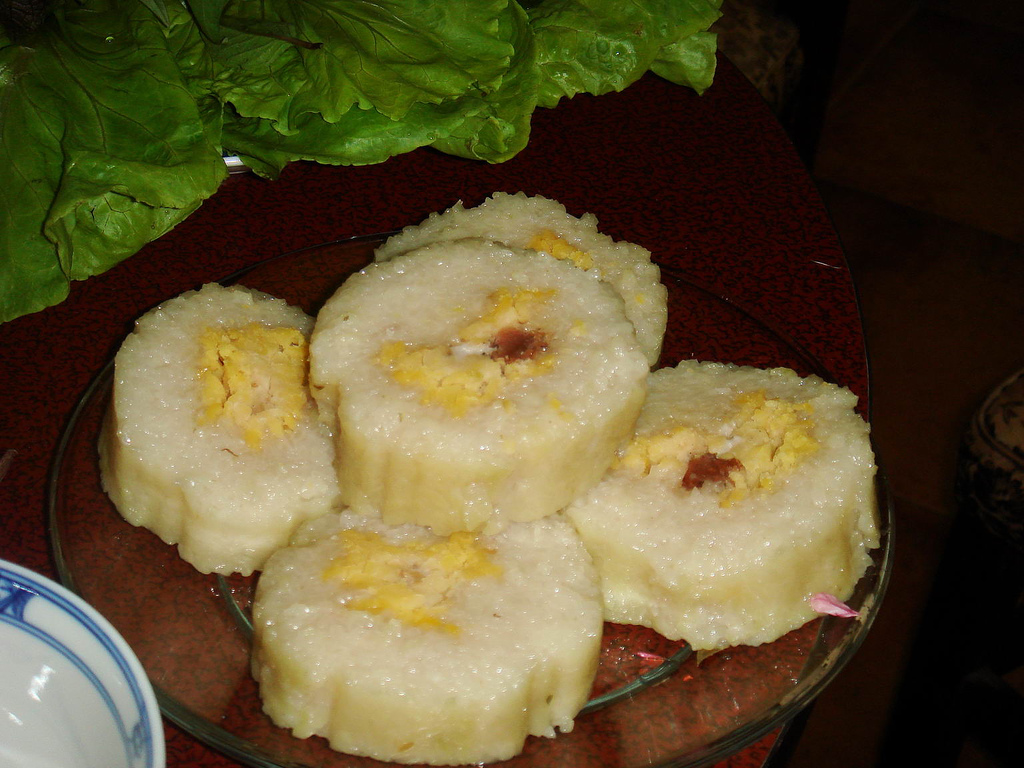
Bánh tét

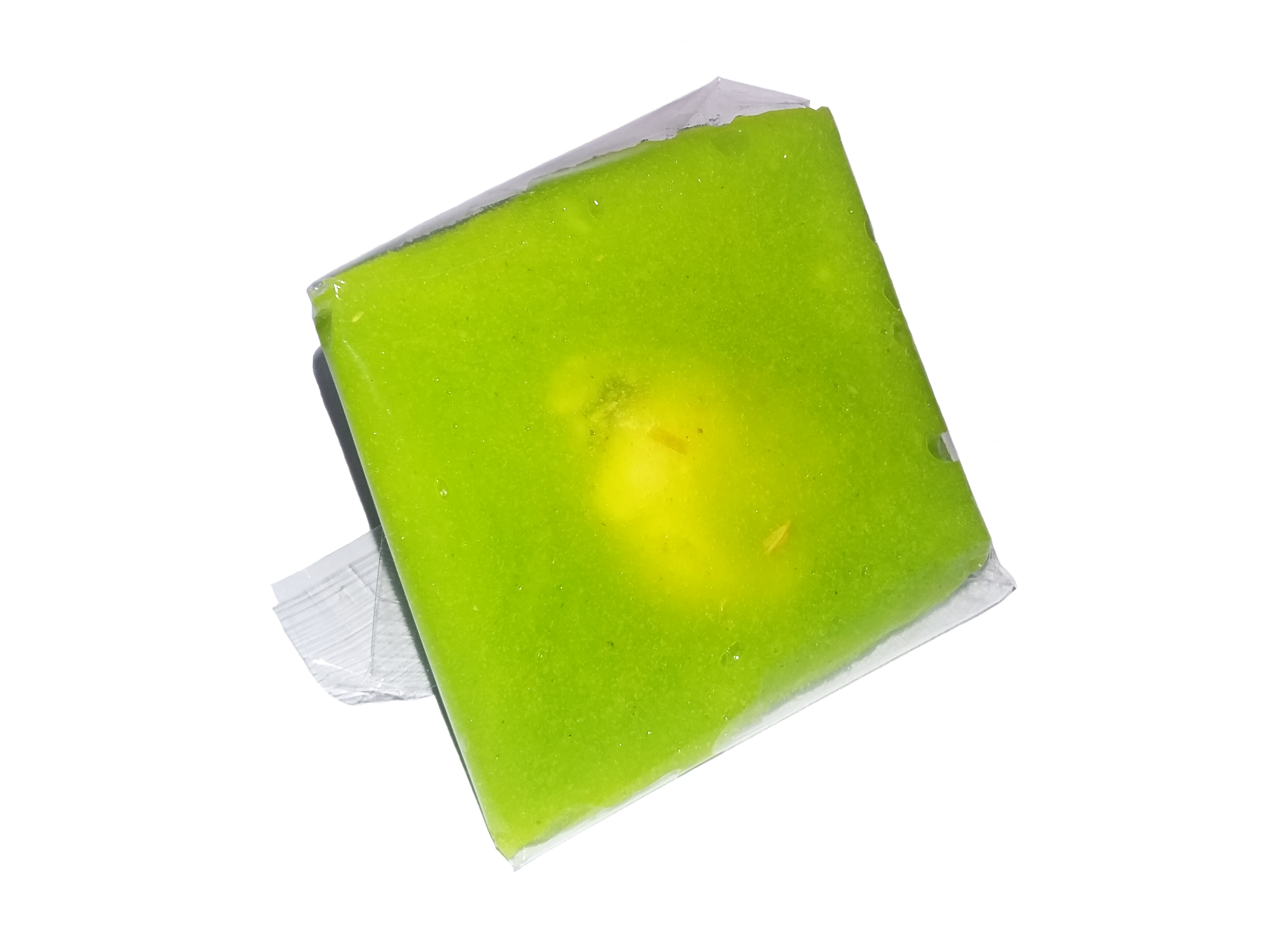
Bánh cốm, made from young glutinous rice paste

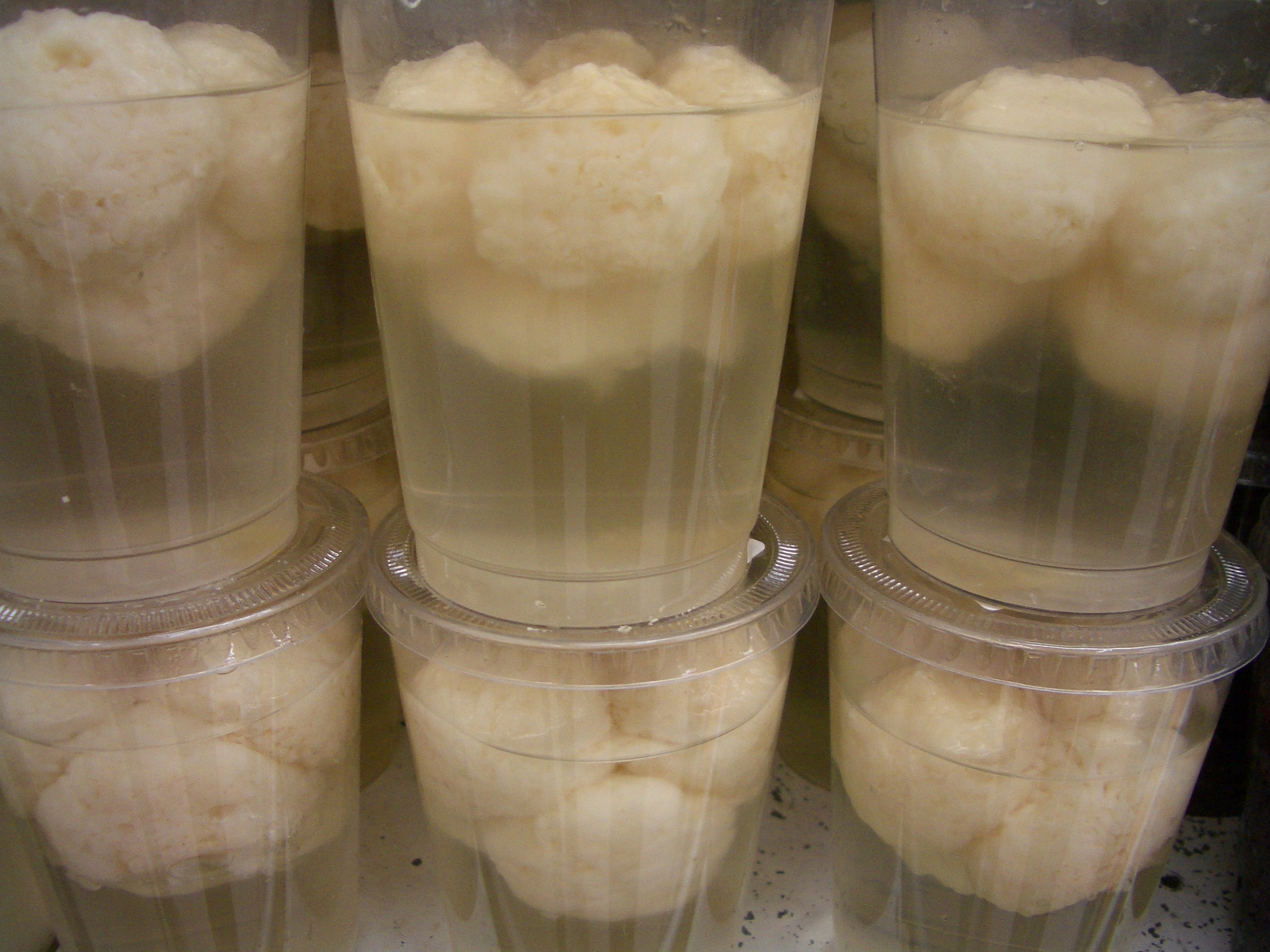
Cơm rượu, fermented glutinous rice as dessert

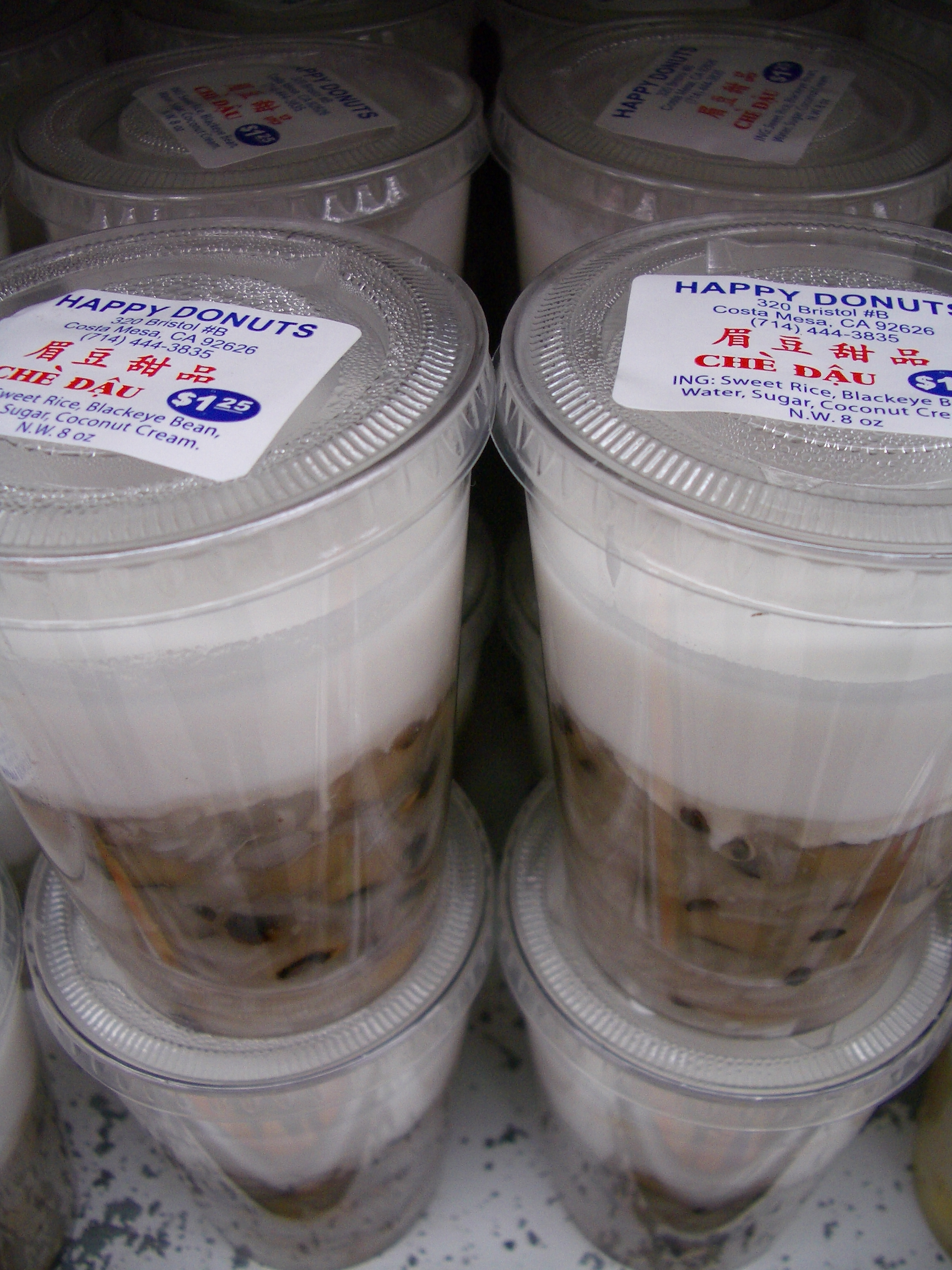
Chè đậu trắng, glutinous rice and black-eyed peas

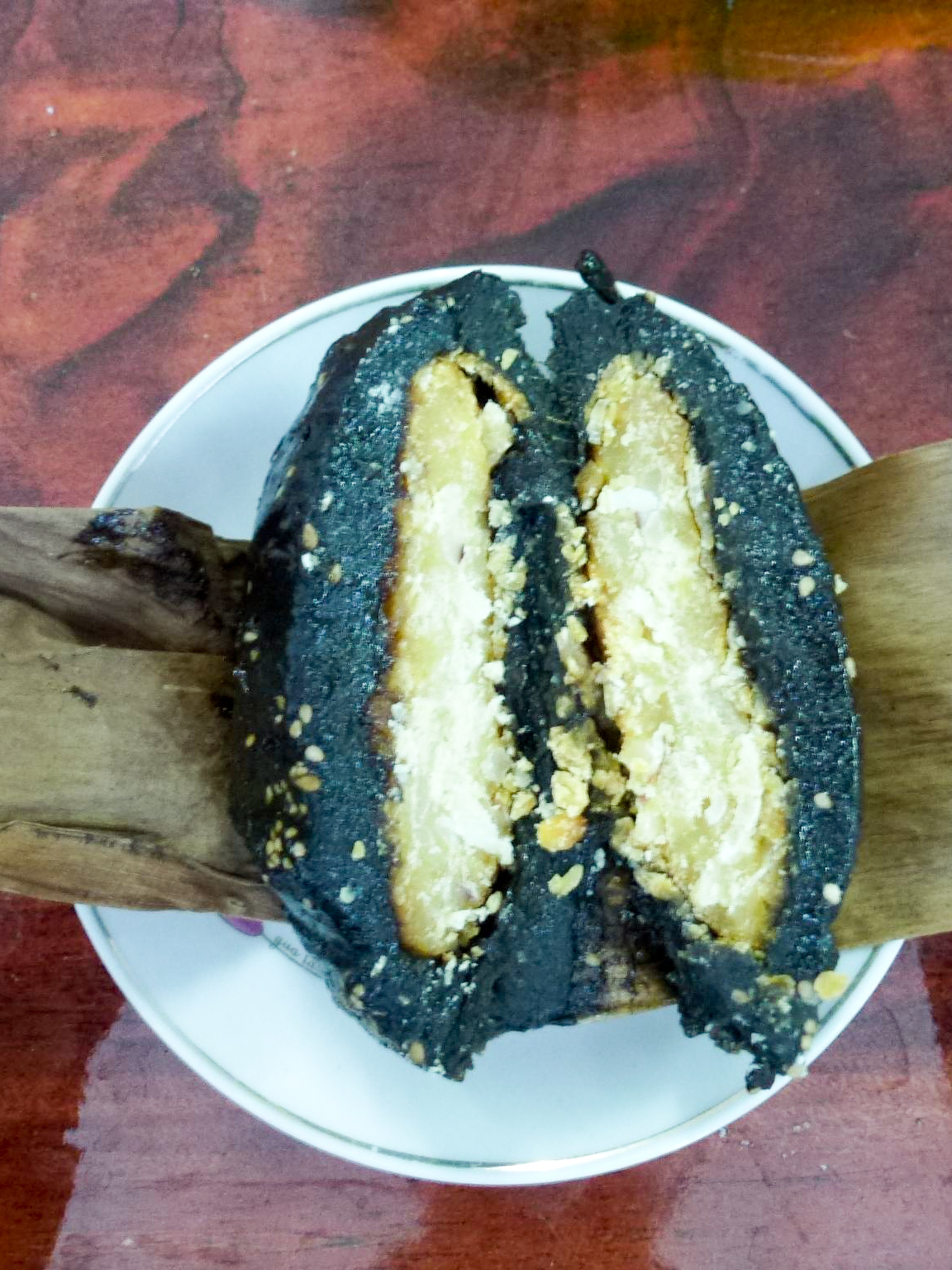
Bánh gai, made with the paste of boehmeria nivea plant

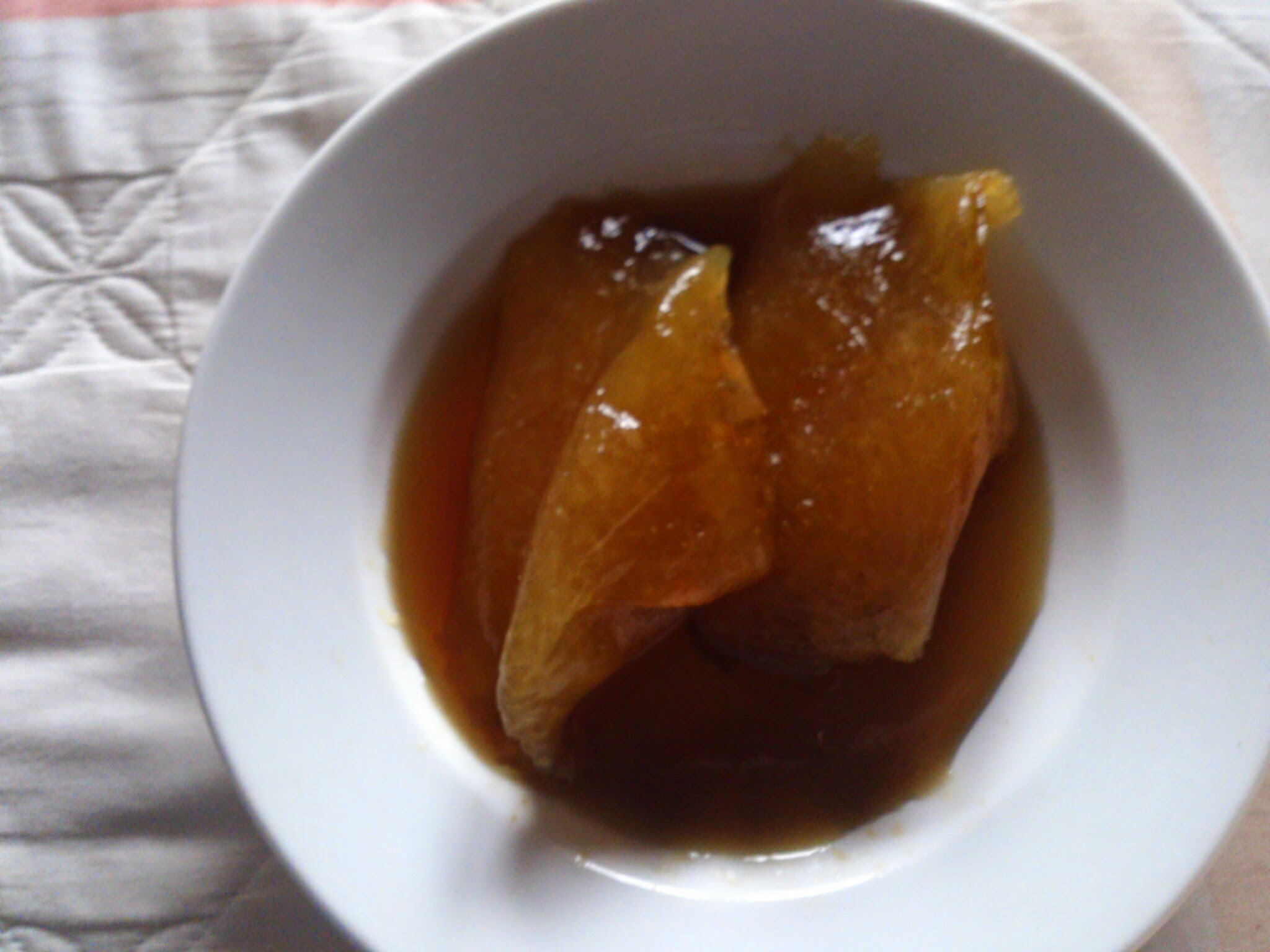
Bánh tro made by glutinous rice soaked overnight in lye

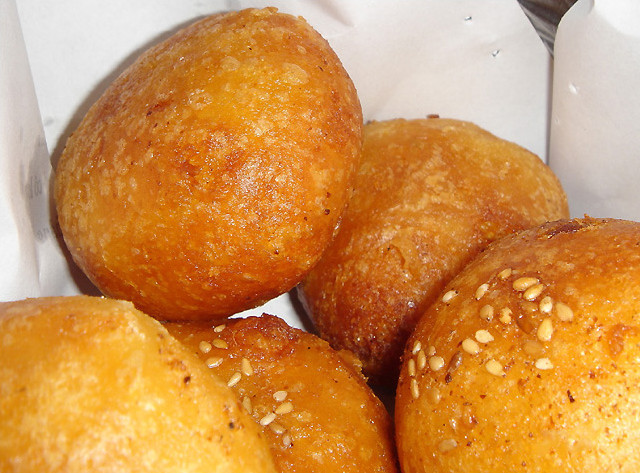
Bánh rán, deep-fried glutinous ball

== Beverages ==
- Choujiu
- Sato (rice wine)
- Home brew sato kits
- Rượu nếp
- Rượu cần

== Non-food uses ==
In construction, glutinous rice is a component of sticky rice mortar for use in masonry. Chemical tests have confirmed that this is true for the Great Wall of China and the city walls of Xi'an. In Assam also, this rice was used for building palaces during Ahom rule.

Glutinous rice starch may also be used to create wheatpaste, an adhesive material.

In Vietnam, glutinous rice is made into flour and used to make tò he, a figurine.

== See also ==
- Cuisine of Assam
- Cuisine of Burma
- Cuisine of Cambodia
- Cuisine of China
  - Hakka cuisine
- Cuisine of Indonesia
- Cuisine of Japan
- Cuisine of Korea
- Cuisine of Laos
- Cuisine of Malaysia
- Cuisine of the Philippines
- Cuisine of Thailand
- Cuisine of Vietnam
