= Palitaw =

Rice cake eaten in the Philippines

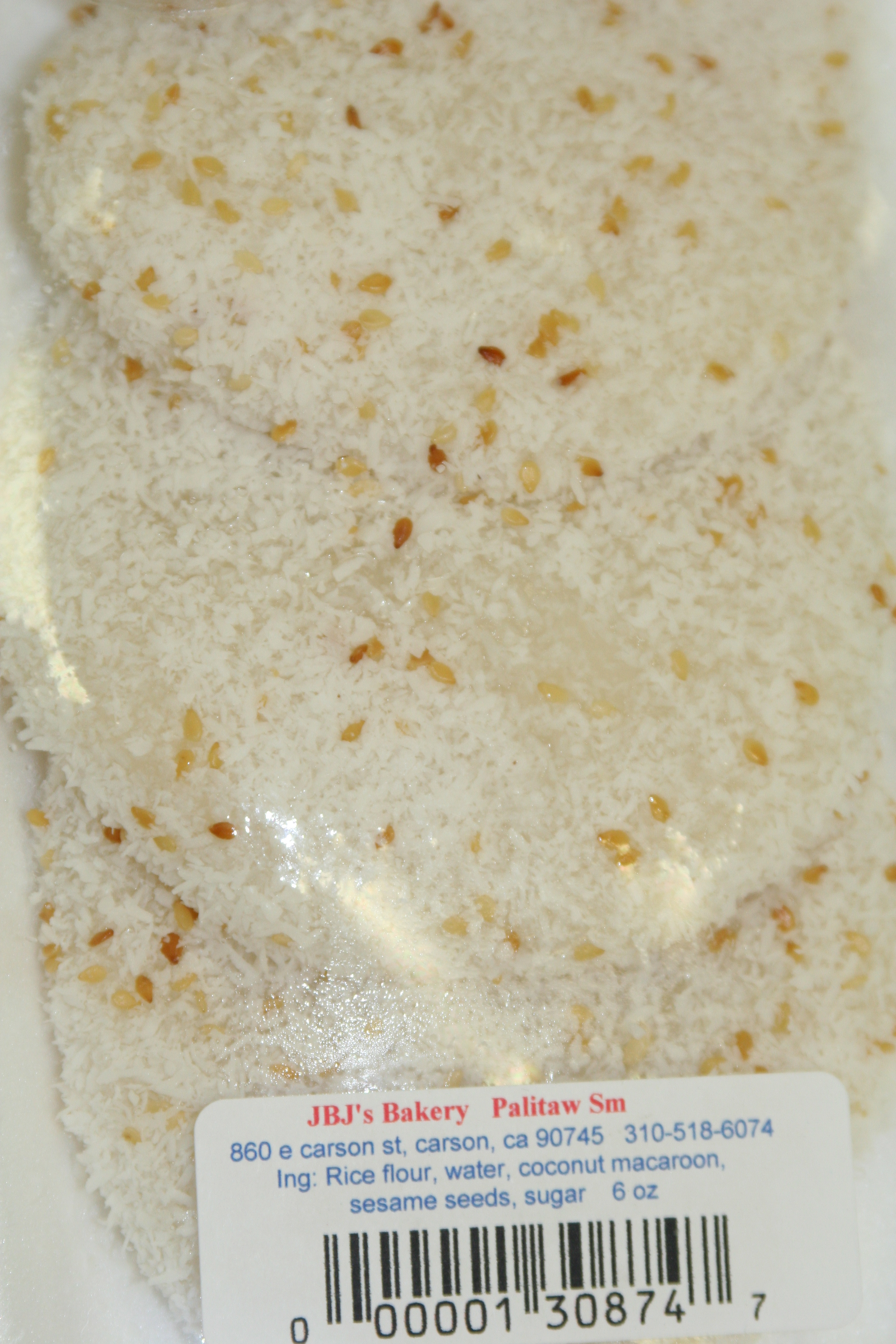
- Package of Palitaw
- Type: Rice cake
- Place of origin: Philippines
- Main ingredients: Glutinous rice, coconut, mascobado, sesame seeds
- Similar dishes: Buchi, Mache, Masi, Moche

Palitaw (from litaw, the Tagalog word for "float" or "rise") is a small, flat, sweet rice cake eaten in the Philippines. They are made from galapong - washed, soaked, and ground malagkit (sticky rice). After excess water is let out from the grinding process, scoops of the batter are rolled and flattened to a circular shape and cooked by dropping into boiling water; floating to the surface is an indication that they are done. Before serving, they are dipped in grated coconut, and presented with a separate mix of sugar and toasted sesame seeds. There are many different kinds of Palitaw including Chocolate Palitaw, which is made like a regular one but with an added flavor of chocolate. There are many small businesses in the industry that sell chocolate Palitaw.

== See also ==
- Buchi
- Mache
- Masi
- Moche
- Pichi-pichi
