= An-doughnut =

Doughnut with red bean paste

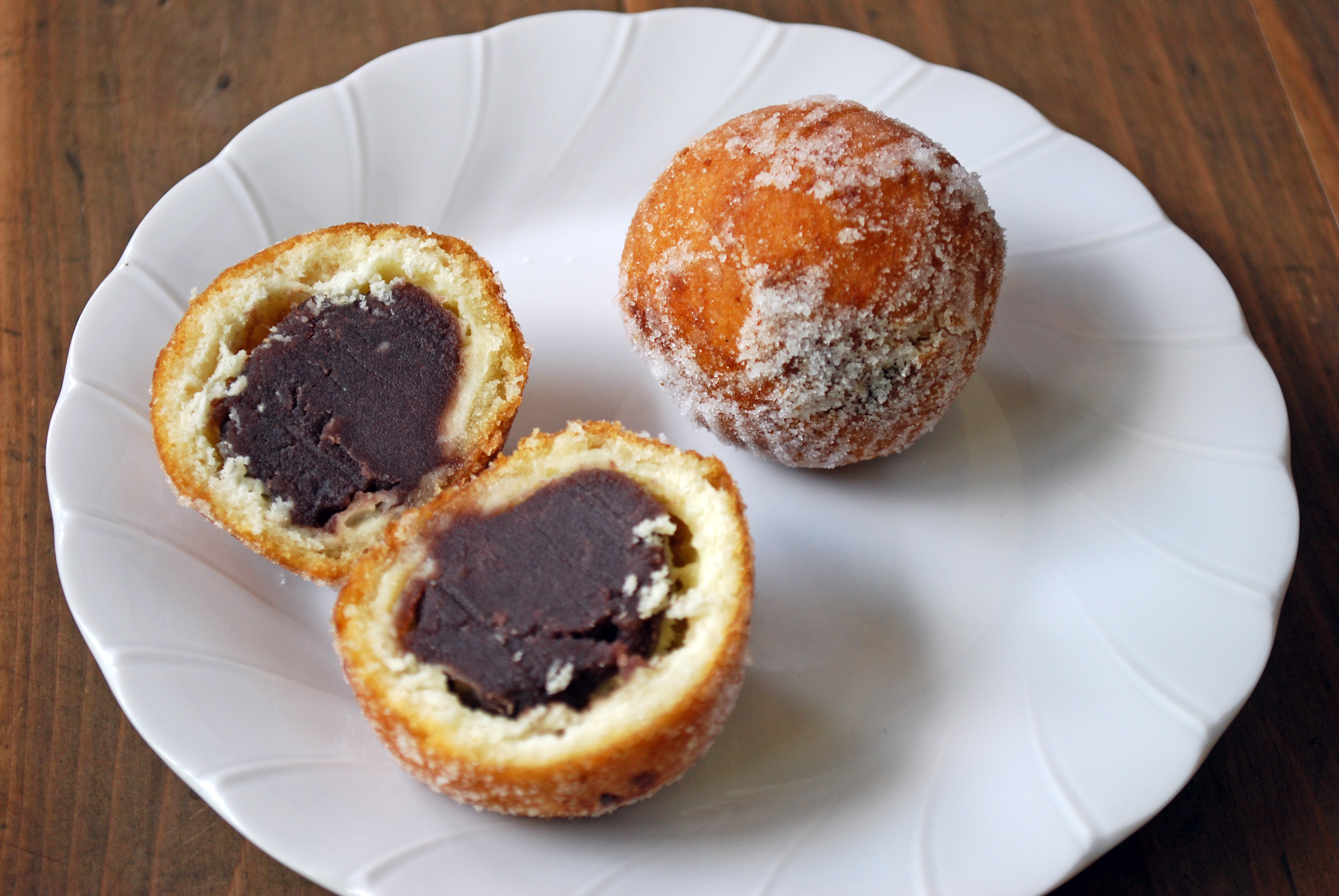
- Type: Doughnut
- Course: Dessert
- Place of origin: Japan
- Main ingredients: red bean paste

An-doughnut (Japanese: あんドーナツ, Romaji: an-dōnatsu) is a Japanese doughnut filled with red bean paste. It is a confection created in Japan, along with anpan, Jam pan, cream pan, curry bread, and many others. It is unknown when an-doughnut was created in Japan. However, Mister Donut in Japan added an-doughnuts to its menu in December 1983. Besides red bean paste, other ingredients include wheat flour, sugar, and eggs. An-doughnuts can be bought in stores such as 7-Eleven and are popular among Japanese people and foreign tourists.

== See also ==
- Chapssal doughnut
- Jelly doughnut
- List of doughnut varieties
