= Bánh rán =

Deep-fried glutinous rice ball Vietnamese dish

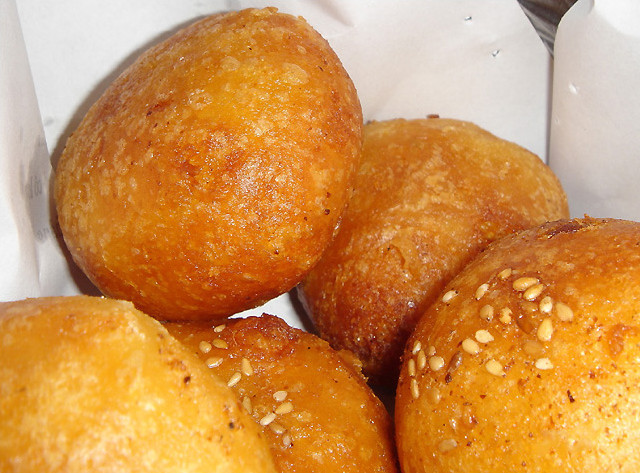
- A container of bánh rán upon being fried with hot cooking oil.
- Type: Deep-fried glutinous rice ball
- Course: Tea, Snack
- Place of origin: Vietnam
- Region or state: North Vietnam

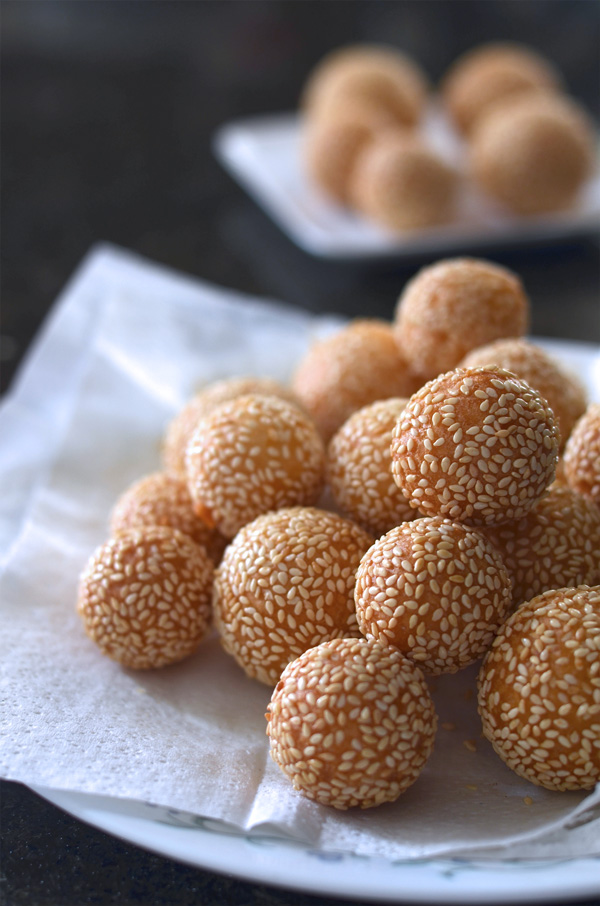
Southern Vietnamese bánh cam

Bánh rán is a deep-fried glutinous rice ball Vietnamese dish from northern Vietnam. In Vietnamese, bánh is a category of food including cakes, pies, and pastries, while rán means "fried."

Its outer shell is made from glutinous rice flour, and sometimes covered with white sesame seeds. Its filling is made from sweetened mung bean paste. Traditionally, the filling should be separated from the shell so that if one shakes the bánh rán, one can feel the filling rattle against the inside of the shell.

In southern Vietnam, a similar dish, called bánh cam, is nearly identical to bánh rán, but the filling does not need to be separated from the shell. In Southern Vietnam, bánh cam is different from bánh rán as the Northern version is traditionally eaten with a sugary syrup that is poured over the pastry.

The savory version of the Northern "bánh rán" usually consists of minced pork, wood-ear mushroom, dry vermicelli, carrot, salt and pepper. This mixture then blend with raw egg to create a soft, salty filling. It usually serves with sweet and sour chili sauce with sliced radish/papaya.

Bánh rán is also the Vietnamese translation of the Japanese confection dorayaki, made famous in Vietnam by the manga Doraemon.

== See also ==
- Chapssal doughnut
- Zin dou
- List of deep fried foods
