= Masi (food) =

Philippine rice dish

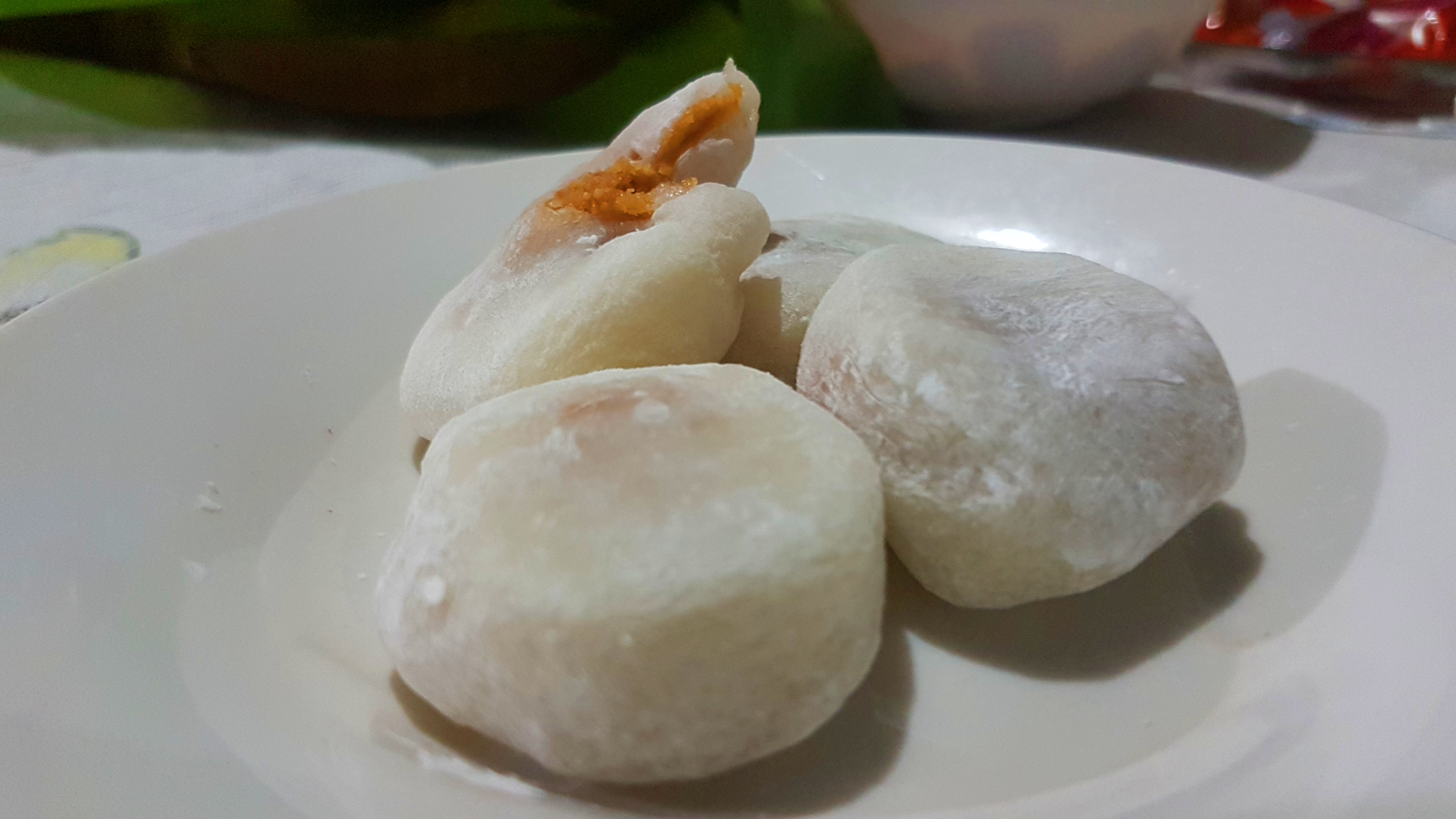
- Masi with peanut butter filling
- Alternative names: Peanut rice ball Macy / Maci
- Course: Dessert or snack
- Place of origin: Philippines
- Region or state: Liloan, Cebu
- Serving temperature: Room temperature
- Main ingredients: Glutinous rice, brown sugar or muscovado, chopped roasted peanuts
- Similar dishes: Moche, Mache, Buchi, Palitaw

Masi or Maci or Macy (Hokkien Chinese: 麻糍; Pe̍h-ōe-jī: môa-chî; Mandarin Chinese: 麻糍; pinyin: mácí) is a dish of glutinous rice balls with a peanut and muscovado filling from Cebu, Philippines. It is made from sweetened galapong (ground-soaked glutinous rice) shaped into little balls with a filling of chopped roasted peanuts and muscovado or brown sugar. It is then boiled in water until it floats. It can also be steamed. It is traditionally sold wrapped in banana leaves. Masi can be modified to use different fillings, like chocolate or peanut butter. Coconut milk may also be used to give the dough a creamier flavor.

Masi is sometimes anglicized as peanut rice balls. Masi is related to the Tagalog mache and the Kapampangan moche, which are prepared similarly.

== See also ==
- Kakanin
- Palitaw
- Sapin sapin
- Tangyuan
- Mochi
