= Chapssal doughnut =

Korean glutinous rice doughnuts

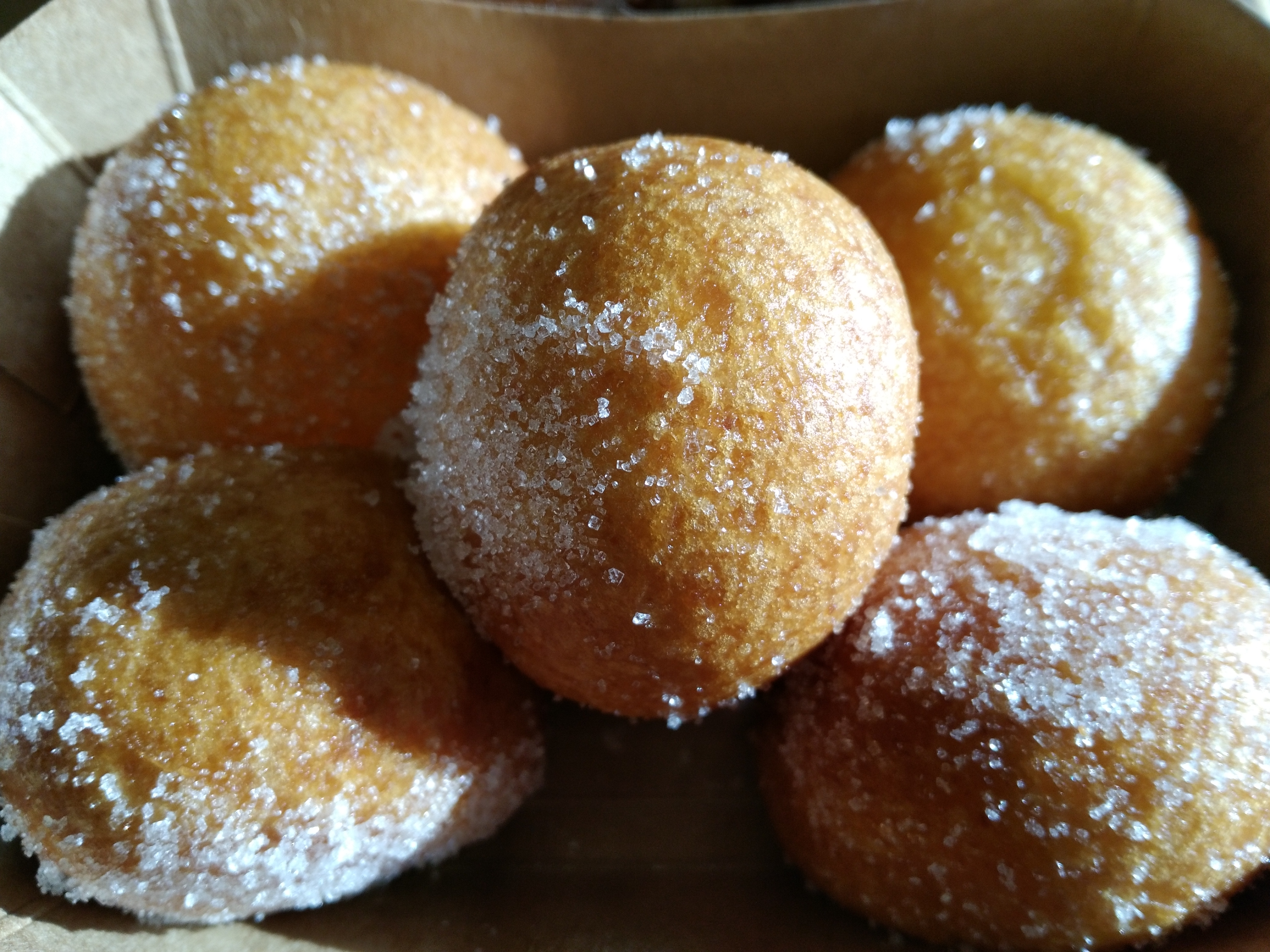
- Alternative names: Glutinous rice doughnut
- Type: Doughnut
- Course: Snack
- Place of origin: Korea
- Associated cuisine: Korean cuisine
- Main ingredients: Dough; glutinous rice flour; wheat flour; sugar; salt; baking powder; red bean paste; adzuki beans; sugar

Korean name
- Hangul: 찹쌀도넛
- RR: chapssal-doneot
- MR: ch'apssal-donŏt
- IPA: tɕʰap̚.s͈al.do.nʌt̚

Chapssal doughnuts (Korean: 찹쌀도넛) are Korean doughnuts made with chapssal flour (glutinous rice flour). The mildly sweet doughnuts are often filled with sweetened red bean paste and coated with the mixture of sugar and cinnamon powder.

== Etymology ==
The Korean compound chapssal-doneot (찹쌀도넛) literally means "glutinous rice doughnut", as chapssal (찹쌀) refers to "glutinous rice" and doneot (도넛) is a loanword from the English word "doughnut".

== Description ==
Glutinous rice flour dough creates the crunchy outside texture and chewy inside texture. Beside food stalls in traditional markets, the doughnuts are also sold through franchise bakeries such as Dunkin' Donuts Korea and Paris Baguette.

== Gallery ==
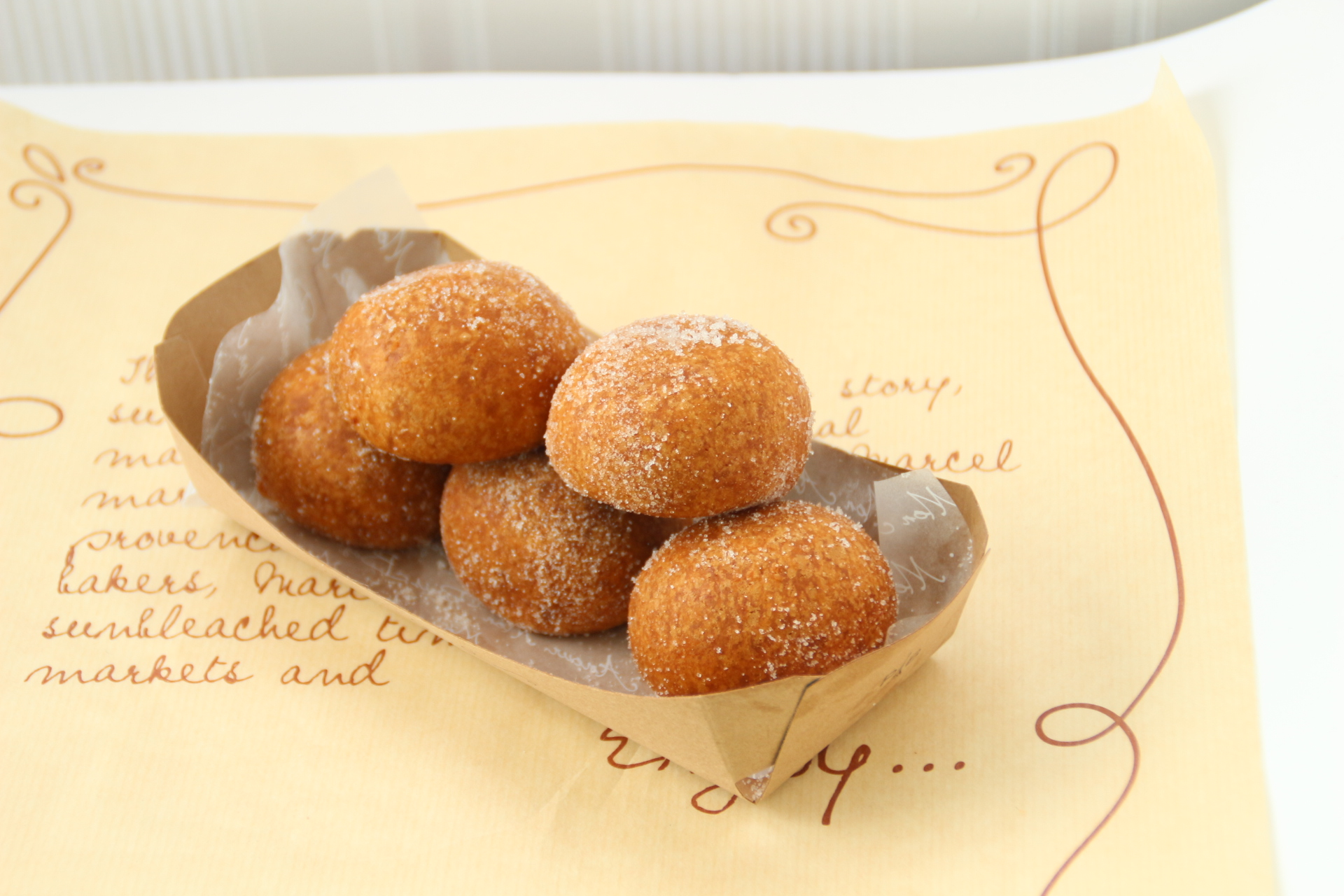

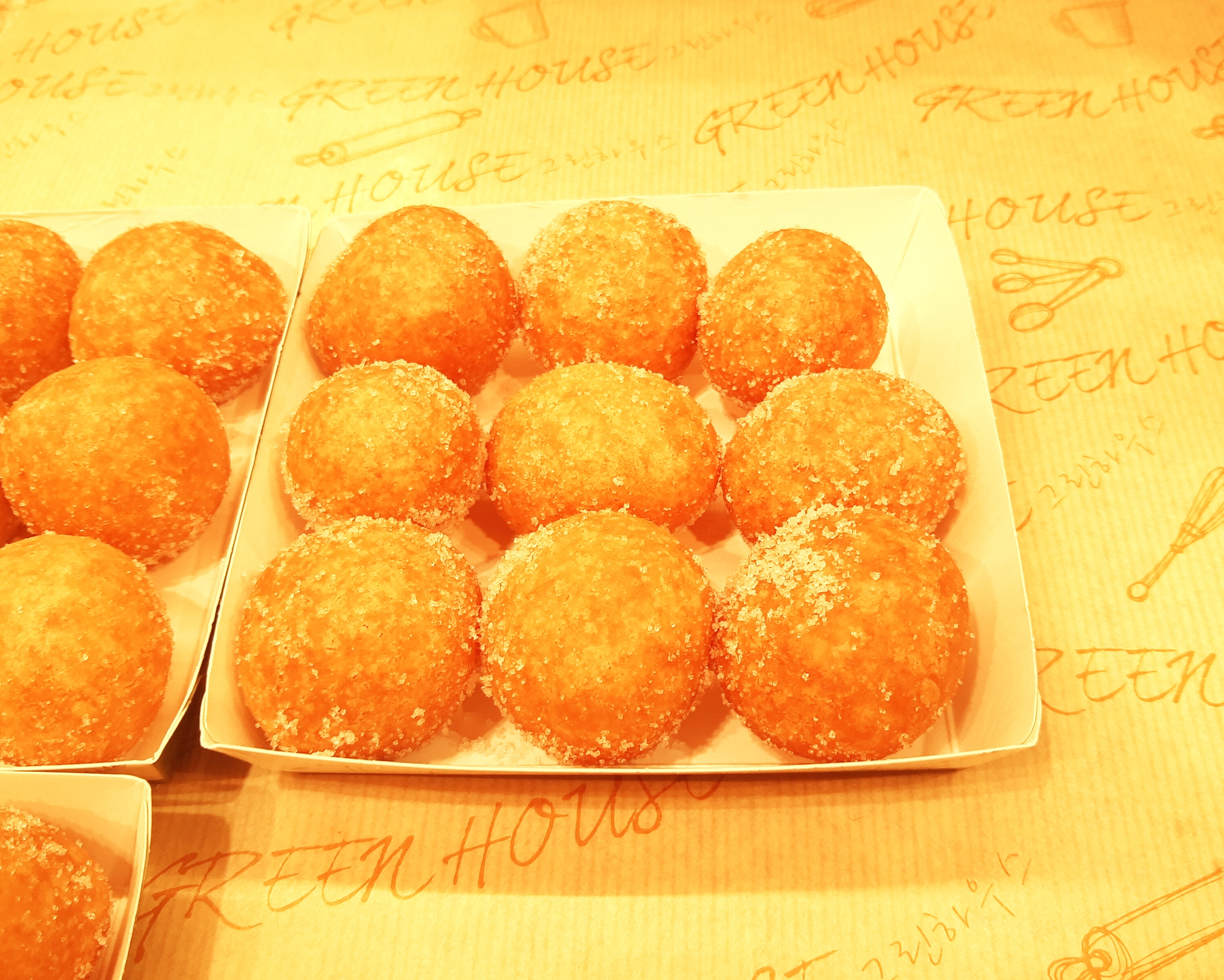

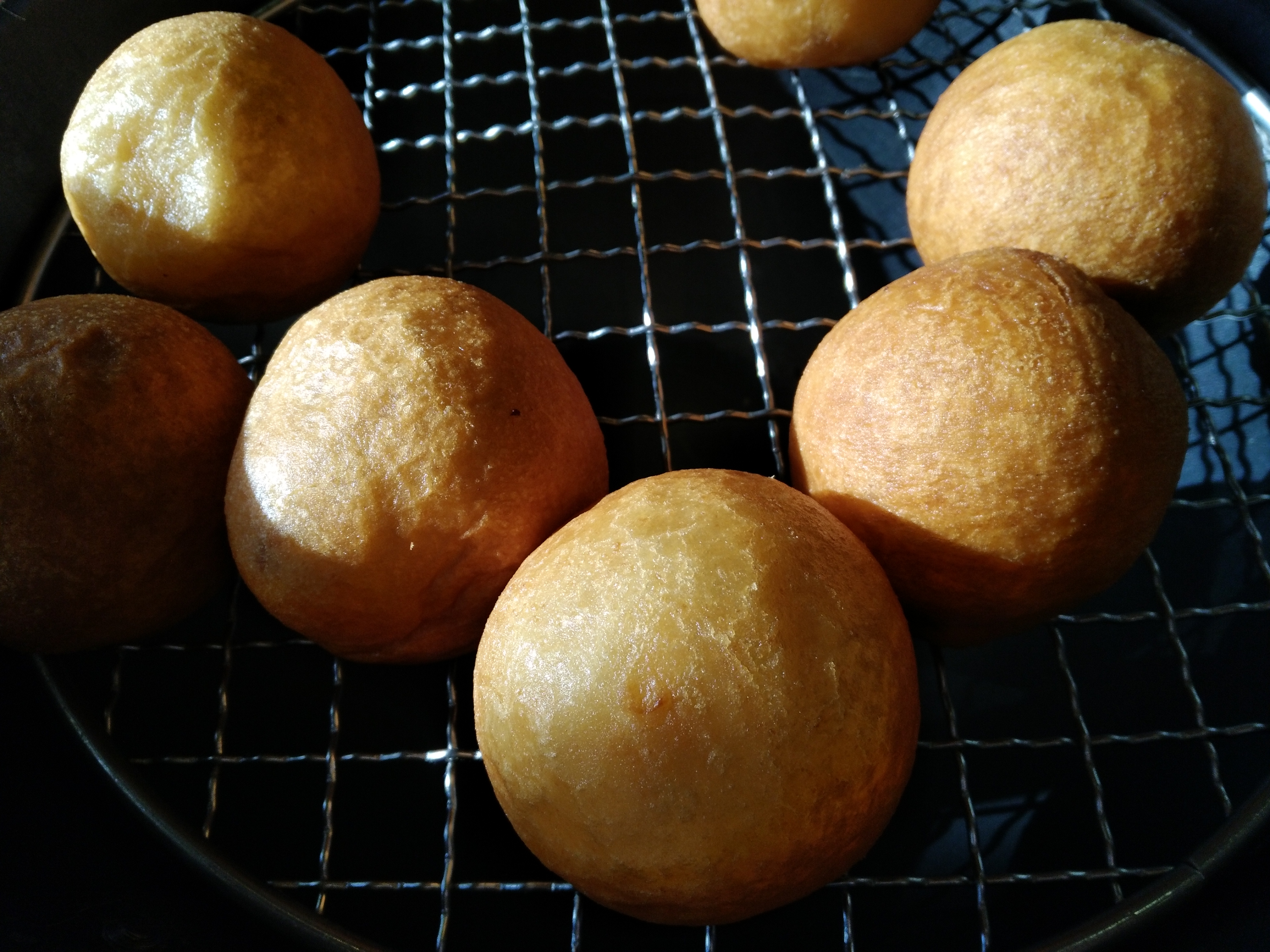

== See also ==
- An-doughnut
- Bánh rán
- Jian dui
- Twisted doughnut
- List of doughnut varieties
- List of fried dough foods
- Oliebol
