= Mache (food) =

Filipino rice dish

- Alternative names: Matse
- Course: Dessert or snack
- Place of origin: Philippines
- Region or state: Santa Rosa and Biñan, Laguna
- Serving temperature: Room temperature
- Main ingredients: Glutinous rice, sugar, pandan, grated coconut
- Similar dishes: Moche, Masi, Buchi, Palitaw

Mache or matse are glutinous rice balls originally plain or flavored with coconut and pandan from the province of Laguna, Philippines. It is made from boiled galapong (ground soaked glutinous rice) usually plain or with pandan flavoring. It is then filled with toasted sesame seeds and sugar and rolled in more glutinous rice flour or powdered sugar for more sweetness. The resulting dish is characteristically white in color or green due to the pandan extracts.

Other versions of the dish do not use pandan and are very similar to the Kapampangan moche and Cebuano masi.

== See also ==
- Kakanin
- Moche
- Palitaw
- Sapin sapin
