= Moche (food) =

Pampangan sweet

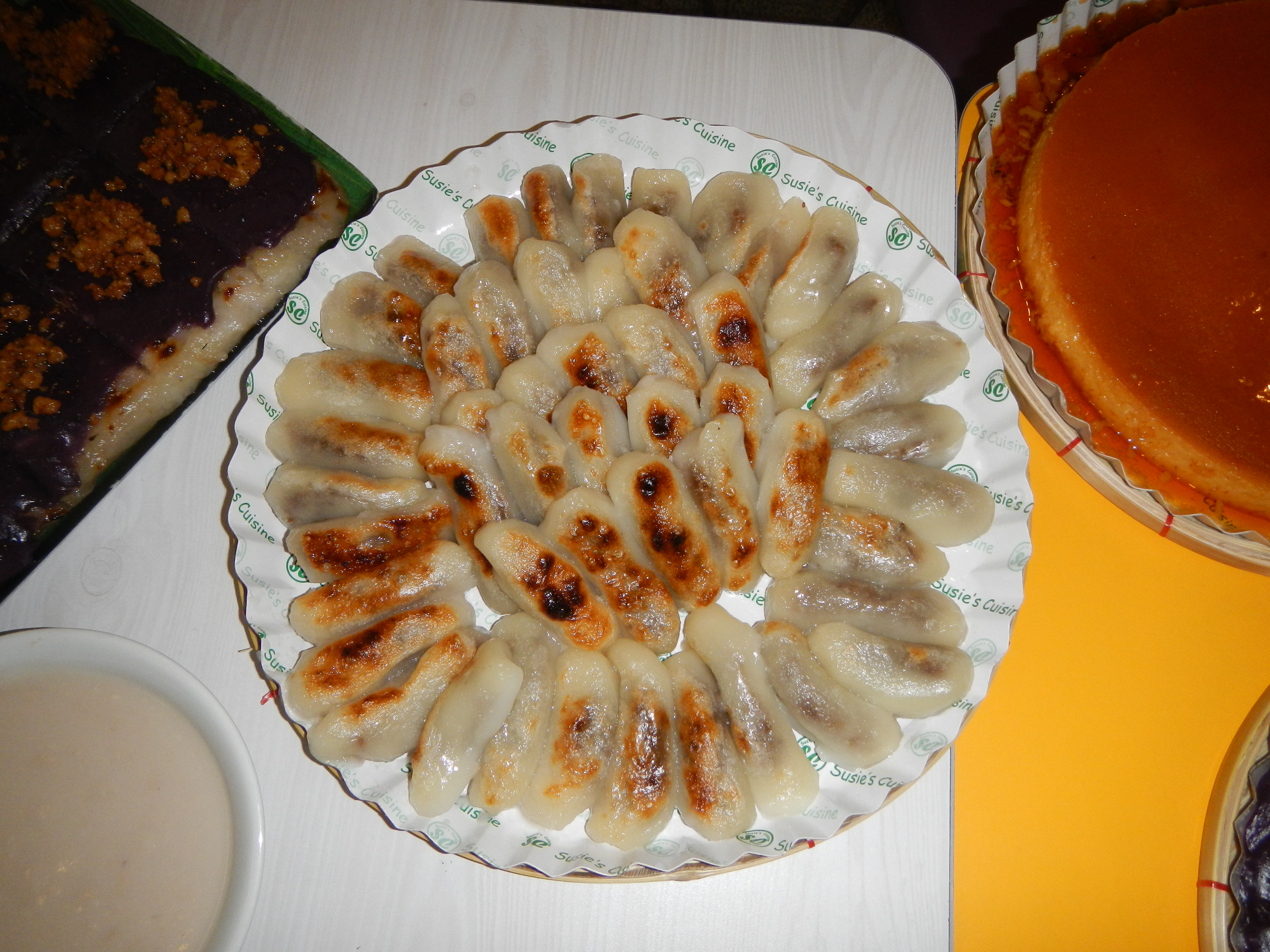
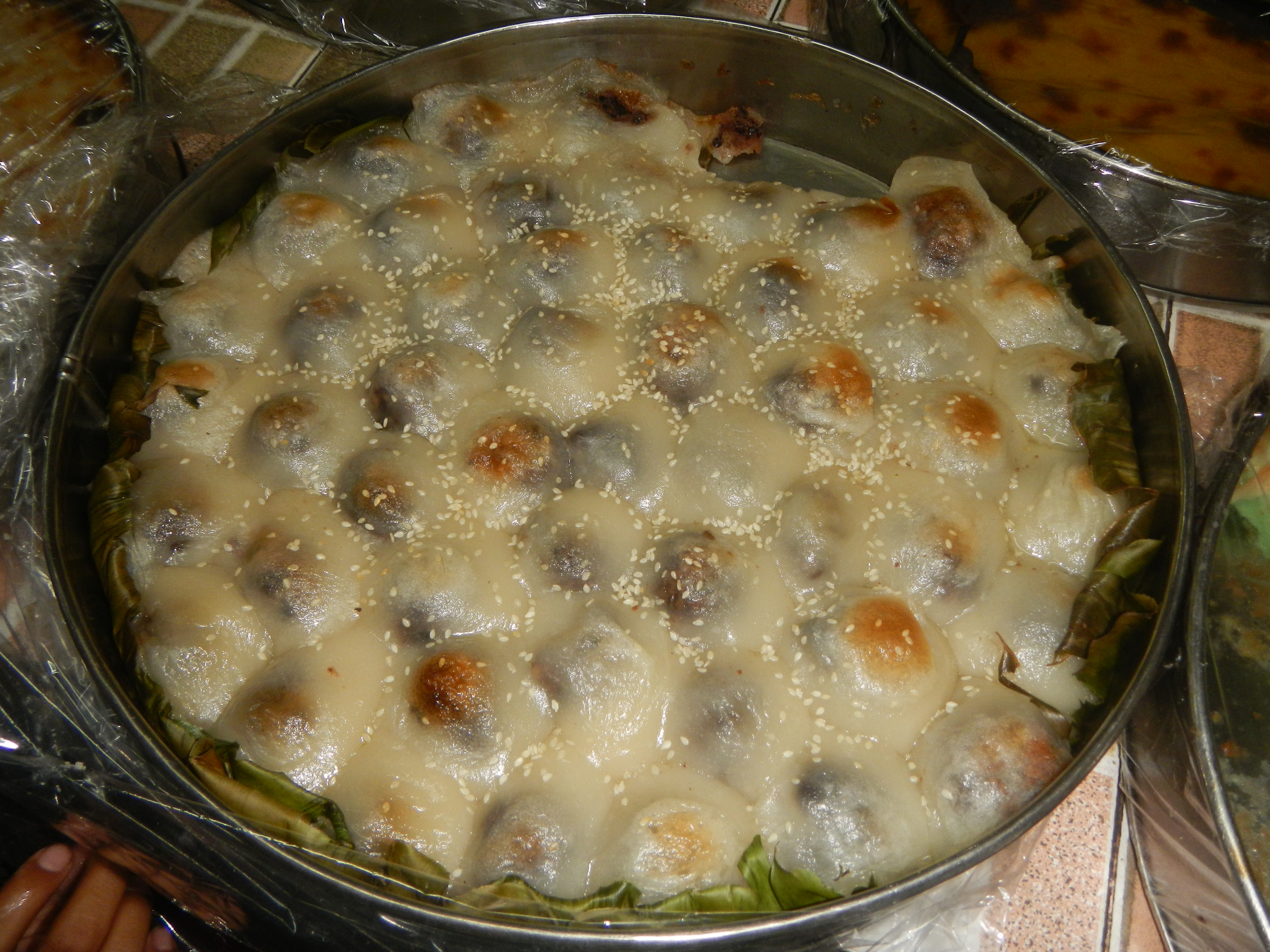
- Alternative names: moche, muchi, moche balls
- Course: Dessert or snack
- Place of origin: Philippines
- Region or state: Pampanga
- Serving temperature: Hot
- Main ingredients: Glutinous rice, coconut milk, mung bean paste/red bean paste/bukayo, sesame seeds
- Similar dishes: Mache, Buchi, Palitaw

Moche (also spelled mochi or muchi; Kapampangan: mutsi) are Pampangan glutinous rice balls with a bean paste filling. Made from galapong (ground-soaked glutinous rice) and filled with mung- or red bean paste, it is shaped into balls or ovals. Bukayo (caramelised grated coconut) may also be used. It is then boiled in water until it floats. It is then sprinkled with sesame seeds or crushed peanuts and served hot with a sauce made from sweetened coconut milk (gata).

Despite the similarity in name and ingredients, moche is not derived from the Japanese mochi or Ryukyu Islands' muchi. It is derived from buchi (or butsi), the Chinese-Filipino version of jian dui. Unlike Chinese buchi, the surface of moche is not browned. This dessert is closely related to the Tagalog mache and Cebuano masi.

== See also ==
- Kakanin
- Palitaw
- Sapin sapin
- Media related to Moche (Kakanin) at Wikimedia Commons
