= Jian dui =

Chinese fried pastry

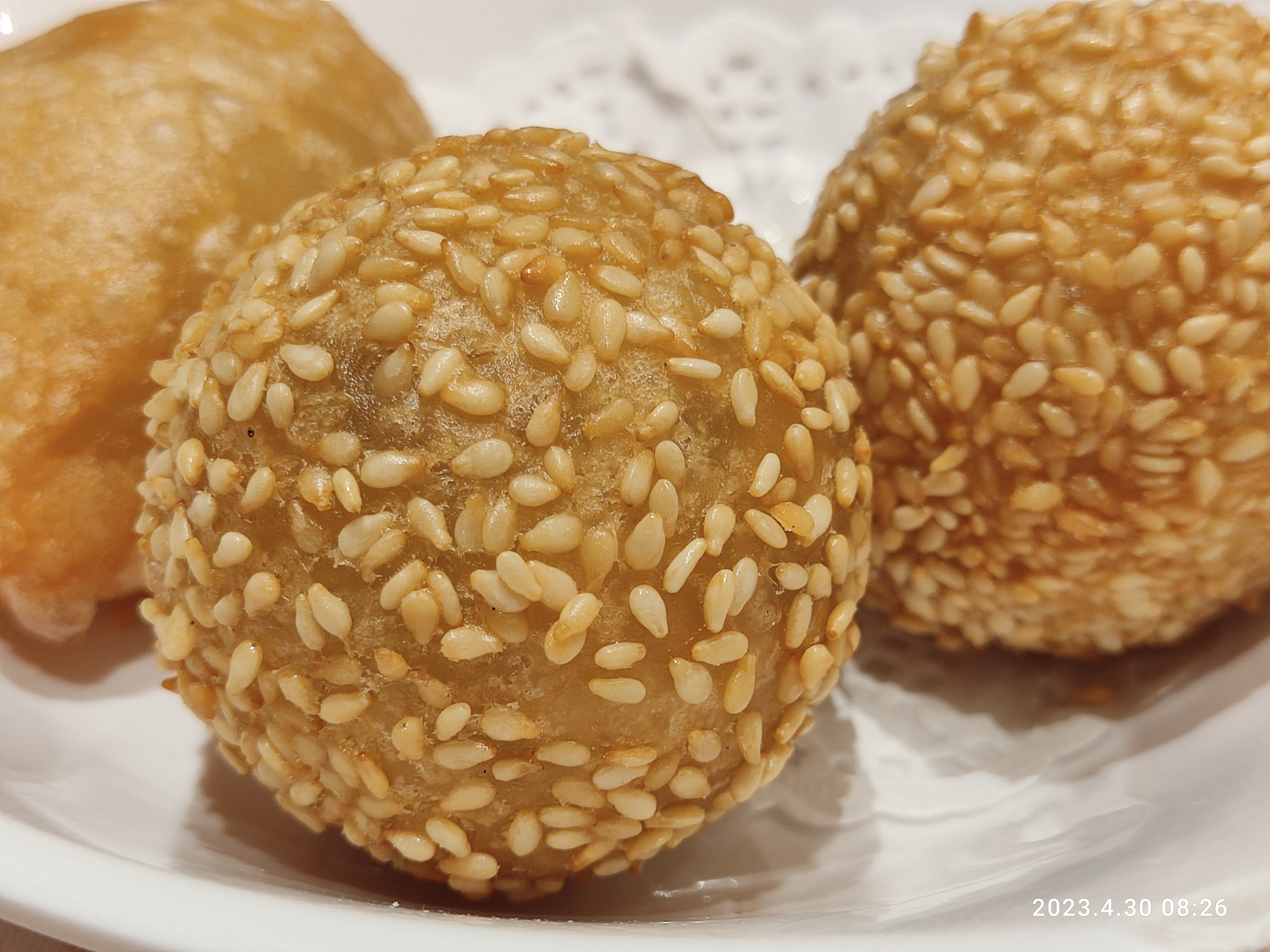
- Alternative names: Matuan, mayuan, zhendai, buchi, onde-onde, sesame ball, sesame seed ball,
- Course: Tea, snack
- Place of origin: Chang'an (now Xi'an), Tang dynasty (China)
- Region or state: East Asia
- Main ingredients: Glutinous rice flour, sesame seeds, various fillings (lotus seed, black bean, red bean, mung bean pastes)

Jian dui
- Chinese: 煎䭔/煎堆
- Hanyu Pinyin: jiānduī
- Jyutping: zin^{1}deoi^{1}
- Literal meaning: fried dumpling/pile
Transcriptions
Standard Mandarin
- Hanyu Pinyin: jiānduī
- Bopomofo: ㄐㄧㄢ ㄉㄨㄟ
- IPA: [tɕjɛ́ntwéi]
Yue: Cantonese
- Yale Romanization: jīndēui
- Jyutping: zin^{1}deoi^{1}
- Sidney Lau: jin1deui1
- IPA: [tsíːntɵ́y]
Southern Min
- Hokkien POJ: tsuann-tui

Sesame ball
- Chinese: 芝麻球
- Hanyu Pinyin: zhīmáqiú
- Jyutping: zi^{1}maa^{4}kau^{4}
- Literal meaning: sesame ball
Transcriptions
Standard Mandarin
- Hanyu Pinyin: zhīmáqiú
- Bopomofo: ㄓ ˙ㄇㄚ ㄑㄧㄡˊ
- IPA: [ʈʂímǎtɕʰjǒu]
Yue: Cantonese
- Yale Romanization: jīmàkàu
- Jyutping: zi^{1}maa^{4}kau^{4}
- Sidney Lau: ji1ma4kau4
- IPA: [tsíːmȁːkʰɐ̏u]

Matuan
- Traditional Chinese: 麻糰
- Simplified Chinese: 麻团
- Hanyu Pinyin: mátuán
- Jyutping: maa^{4}tyun^{4}
- Literal meaning: sesame dumpling
Transcriptions
Standard Mandarin
- Hanyu Pinyin: mátuán
- Bopomofo: ㄇㄚˊ ㄊㄨㄢˊ
- IPA: [mǎtʰwǎn]
Yue: Cantonese
- Yale Romanization: màtyùn
- Jyutping: maa^{4}tyun^{4}
- Sidney Lau: ma4tuen4
- IPA: [mȁːtʰy̏ːn]
Southern Min
- Hokkien POJ: mâ-thn̂g

Jian dui or sesame balls are a type of fried Chinese pastry made from glutinous rice flour. The pastry is coated with sesame seeds on the outside and is crisp and chewy after immediately being cooked. Inside the pastry is a large hollow, caused by the expansion of the dough. The hollow of the pastry is filled with a filling usually consisting of lotus paste, or alternatively, sweet black bean paste, or red bean paste.

Depending on the region and cultural area, jiandui are known as matuan (麻糰) in North and Northwest China, mayuan (麻圆) in Northeast China, and zhendai (珍袋) in Hainan.

== Origin ==
The origins of jian dui can be traced back to the Tang dynasty as a royal food in Chang'an, known as lüdui (碌䭔). This food item was also recalled in a poem by the Tang poet Wang Fanzhi. With the southward migration of many peoples from central China since the An–Shi Rebellion, the jian dui was brought along and hence became part of southern Chinese cuisine.

== Across Asia ==
=== East Asia ===
In Hong Kong, it is one of the most standard pastries. It can also be found in most Chinatown bakery shops overseas.

In Japan, it is known as goma dango (ごま団子; sesame dumpling). It is often sold at street fairs, in Chinese districts, and at various restaurants.

In Korea, it is called jungguksik chamkkaegyeongdan (중국식 참깨경단, "Chinese-style sesame rice ball cake"), to avoid confusion with the Korean-style sesame rice ball cake (chamkkae-gyeongdan) with sesame coating. As the Chinese jian dui is first coated with sesame seeds then deep-fried, while the Korean gyeongdan is first boiled then coated with toasted sesame seeds, jian dui is also called twigin chamkkaegyeongdan (튀긴 참깨경단, "deep-fried sesame rice ball cake").

=== Southeast Asia ===
==== Cambodia ====
The pastry is called num kroch or nom kroch (Khmer: នំក្រូច, lit. 'orange cake' due to its shape resembling the fruit) in Khmer and was introduced in Cambodia by Chinese migrants.

==== Indonesia and Malaysia ====
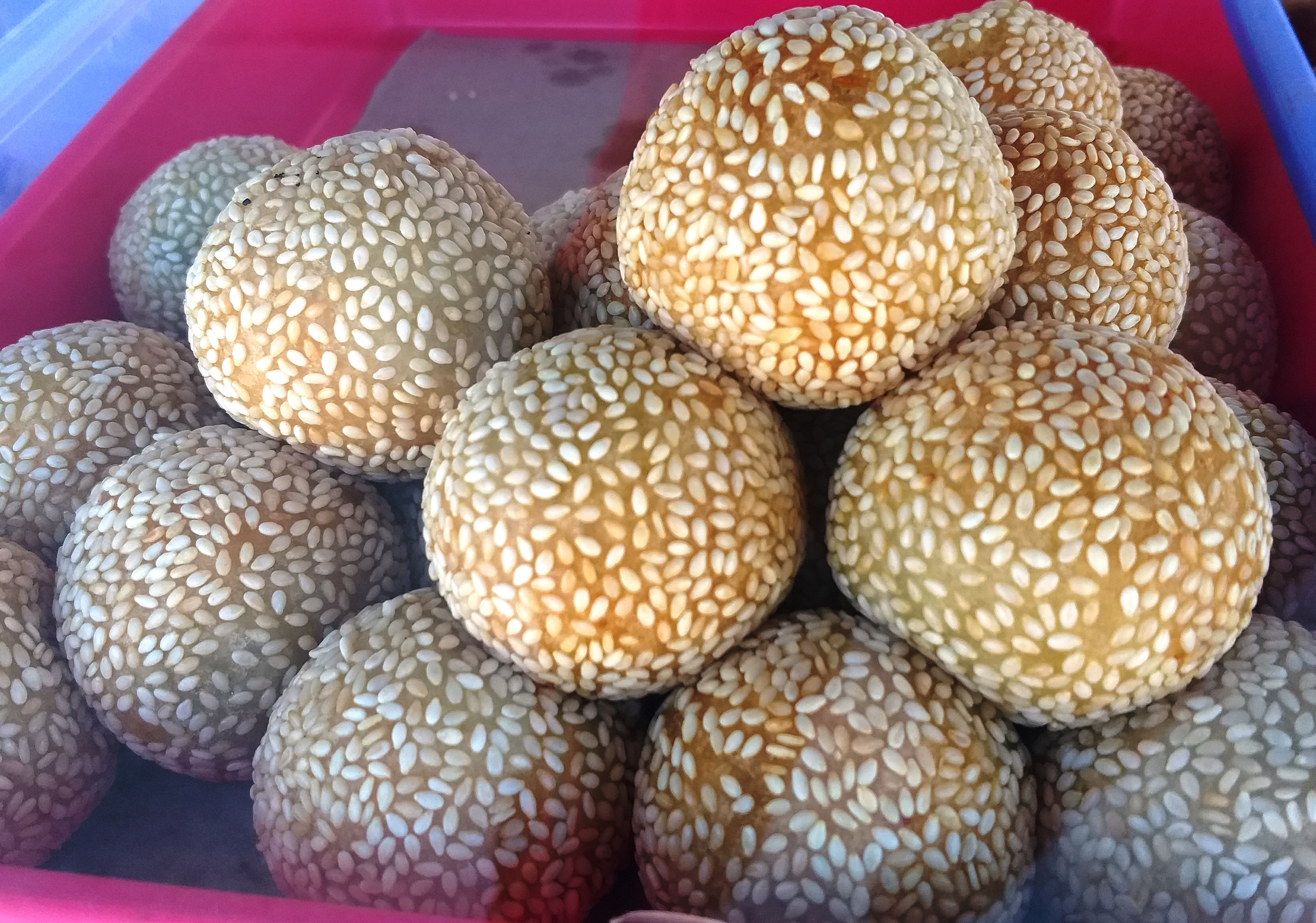
Indonesian onde-onde

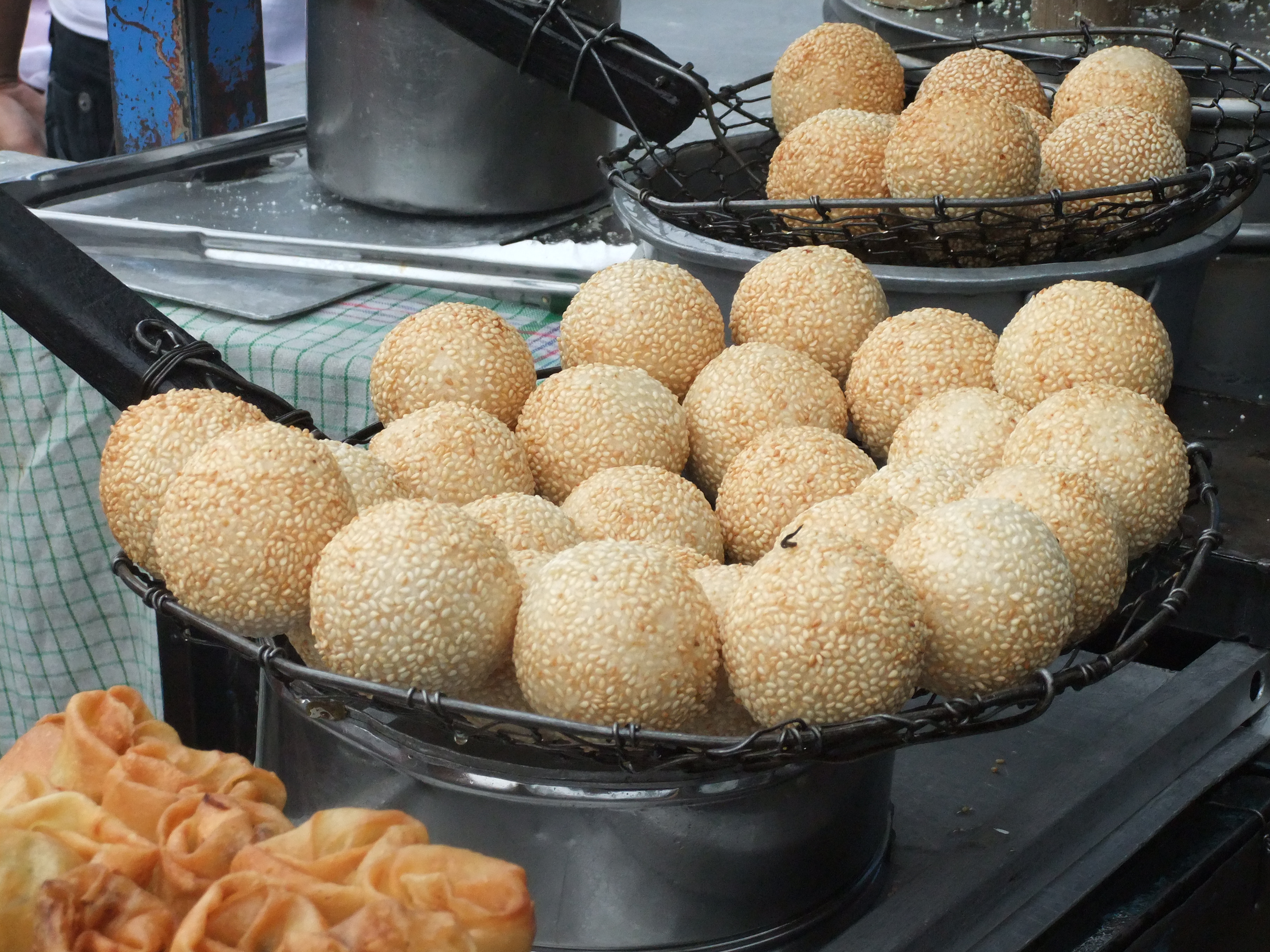

In Indonesian cuisine, it is called onde-onde or kue moci, filled with sweetened mung bean paste. People usually eat it as a snack. This pastry is also popular and widely available in Indo (Eurasian), Indonesian, and Vietnamese outlets in the Netherlands.

In Malaysia, it is known as kuih bom, which is usually filled with shredded sweetened coconut, or nuts. Occasionally, it may be filled with red bean paste. Among the mainly Hakka-speaking ethnic Chinese in the state of Sabah, jian dui is more commonly known as you chi.

==== Philippines ====
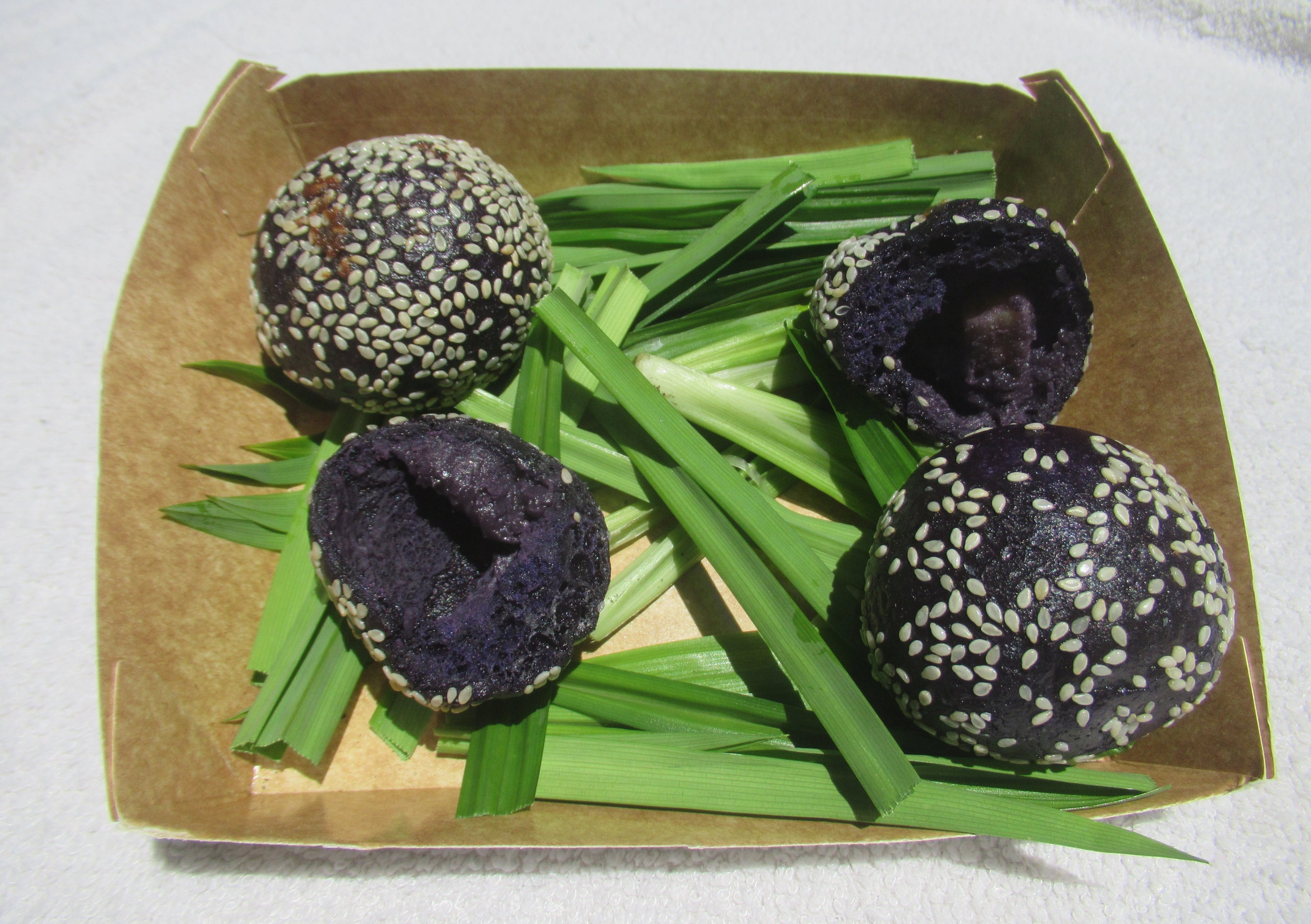
Ube-flavored Filipino butsi

In the Philippines, jian dui is called butsi (Spanish: buchi). Due to hundreds of years of Chinese settlement in the Philippines, the integration of Chinese cuisine (particularly Cantonese and Fujian) to local dishes has made buchi quite popular. To an extent, it has already been considered an icon of Chinese Filipino culinary tradition, sometimes associated with auspiciousness. As it is well known among ethnic Chinese and other Filipinos alike, local restaurants which are sometimes not even Chinese and fastfood chains such as Chowking have added the delicacy to the menu. Aside from the usual lotus and red bean paste, non-Chinese and indigenous ingredients have also been used for variety, such as ube-flavored butsi. Unlike jian dui, Filipino buchi and derivates (like mache, masi, moche, and palitaw) can also be boiled or steamed, in addition to being deep fried.

==== Vietnam ====
In Vietnamese cuisine, two very similar dishes are called bánh cam (from southern Vietnam) and bánh rán (from northern Vietnam), both of which have a somewhat drier filling that is made from sweetened mung bean paste. Bánh rán is scented with jasmine flower essence (called mali in Thai).

Bánh rán can be sweet or savory. It is typically made with red bean. The sweet one is filled with mung bean. The savory one is filled with chopped meat, cassava vermicelli, mushroom, and a variety of other typically Vietnamese ingredients. It is usually served with vegetable and dipping sauce.

== Outside Asia ==
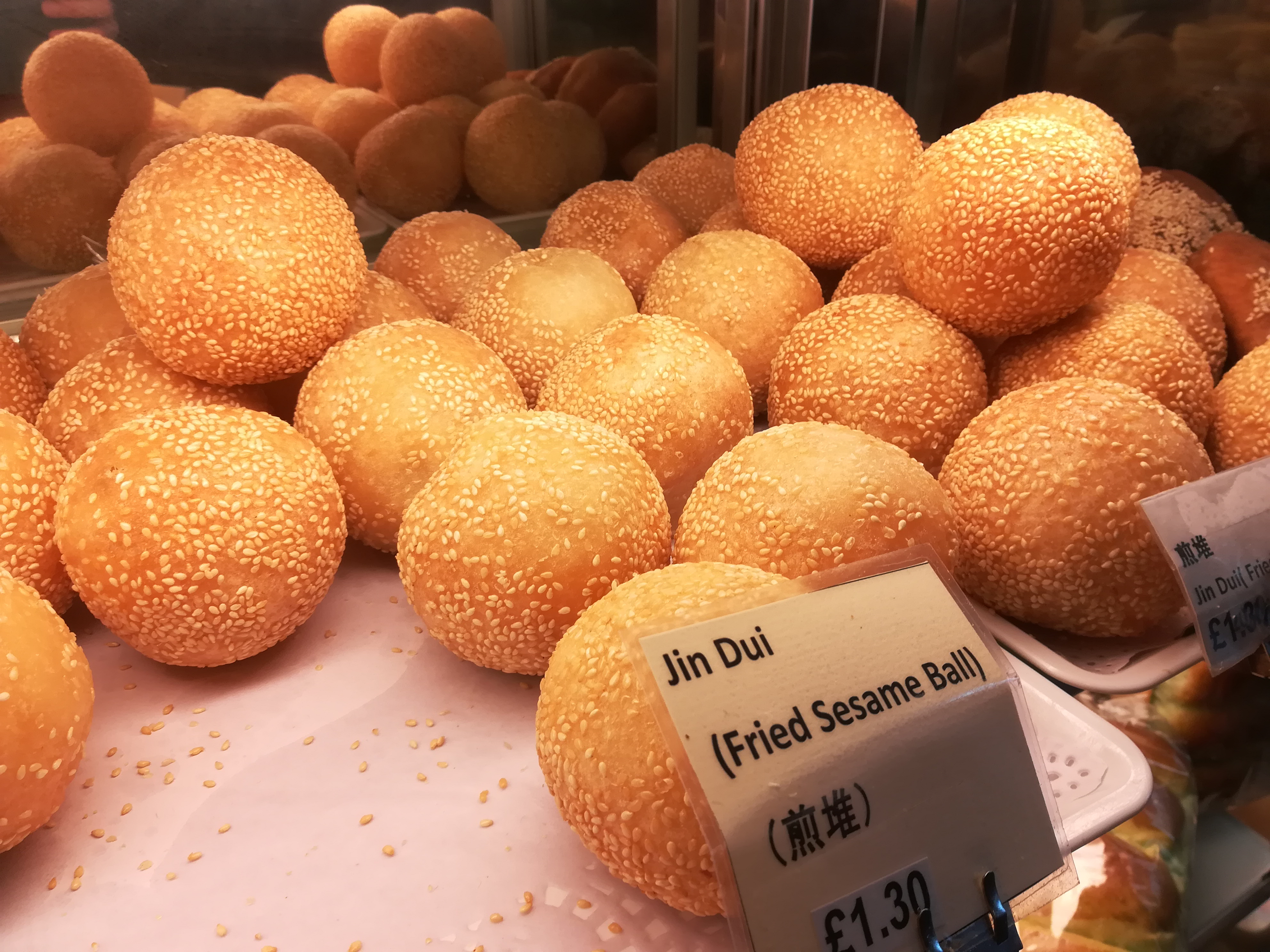
Jian dui in London's Chinatown

=== Mauritius ===
In Mauritius, jian dui is called jien-yan-e (Chinese: 煎丸欸) by the local Chinese community, but it is more commonly known as gato zinzli (also written as gato zingli or gato zinli) in creole. It can literally be translated as "sesame cake". It is one of the Mauritian snacks which was influenced by the presence of Sino-Mauritians on the island. The gato zinzli originated from China and was introduced in Mauritius by the Chinese migrants from Guangzhou and Guangdong in the 18th or 19th century. It is deep fried until it is slightly chewy and crispy outside before being coated with sesame seeds; it is made of sweet potato, glutinous rice, and sometimes, with red bean paste. They are typically eaten as snacks; but they are especially eaten during Chinese New Year as a traditional snack by Sino-Mauritians. The gato zinzli are also shared to family members and acquaintances on Chinese New Year by Sino-Mauritians as part of their customary tradition in order to accentuate the sharing and spirit of friendship.

=== United States ===
In American Chinese restaurants and pastry shops, jian dui are known as sesame seed balls.

== Gallery ==
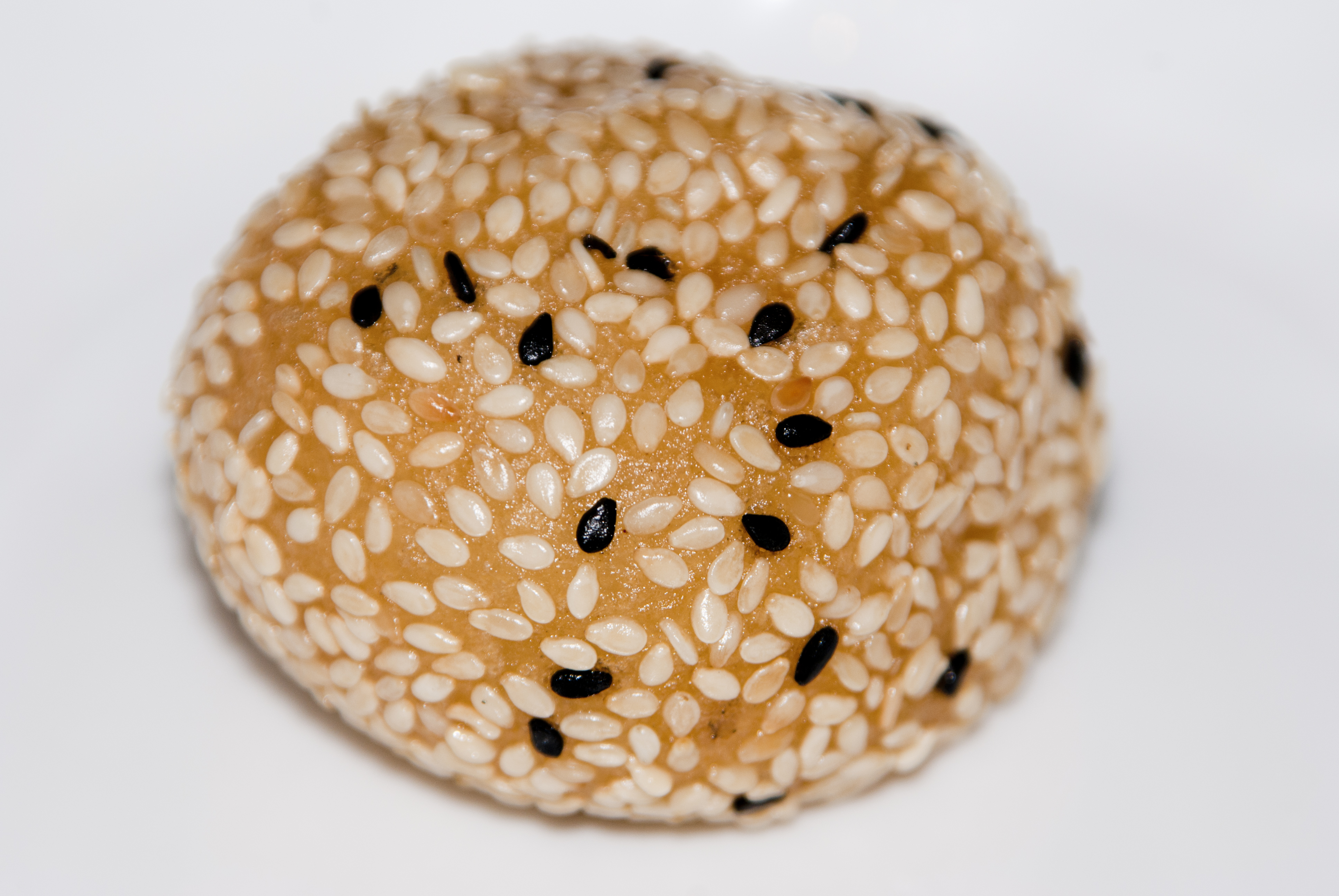
Chinese jian dui with black and white sesame

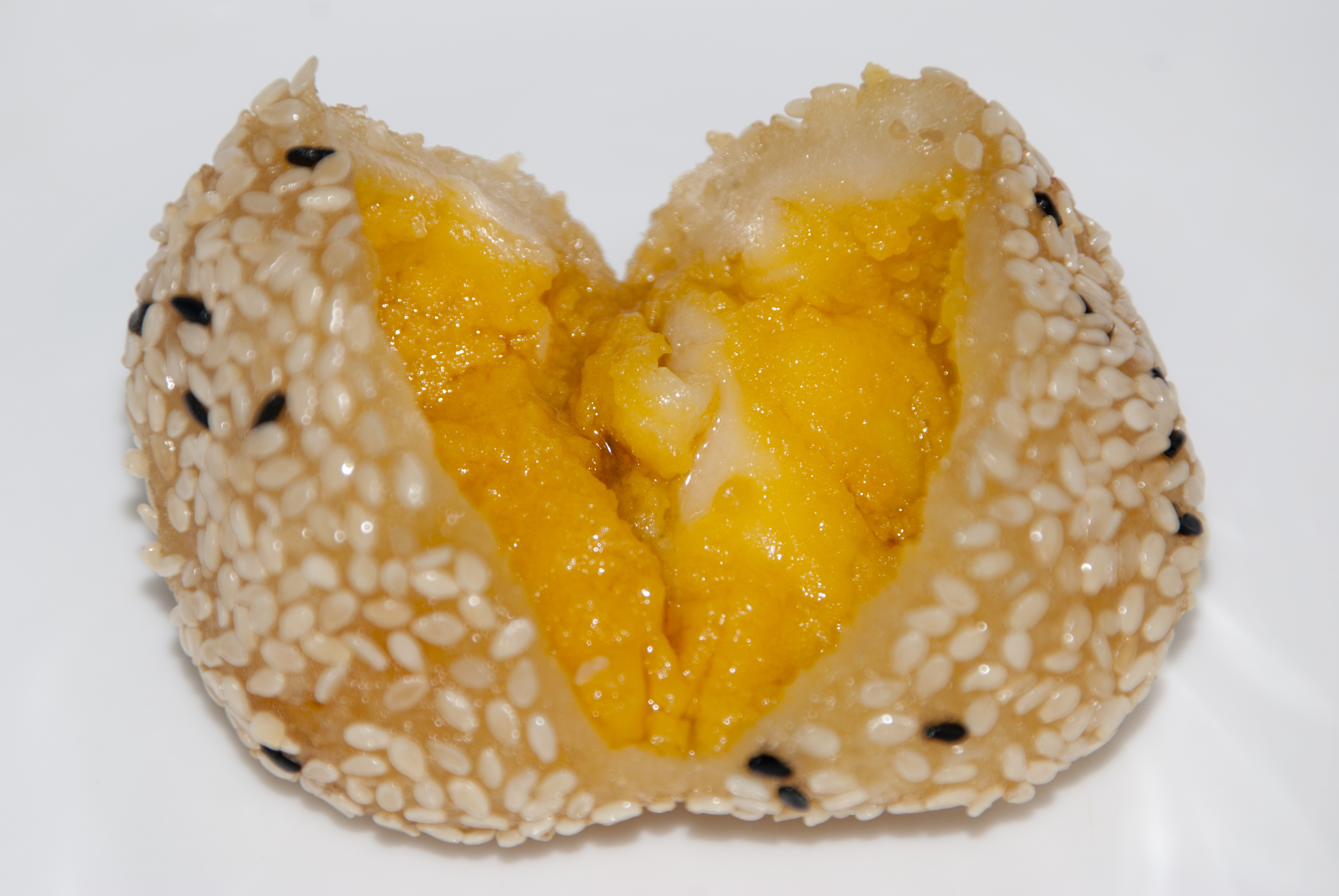
Chinese jian dui with fillings and black and white sesame

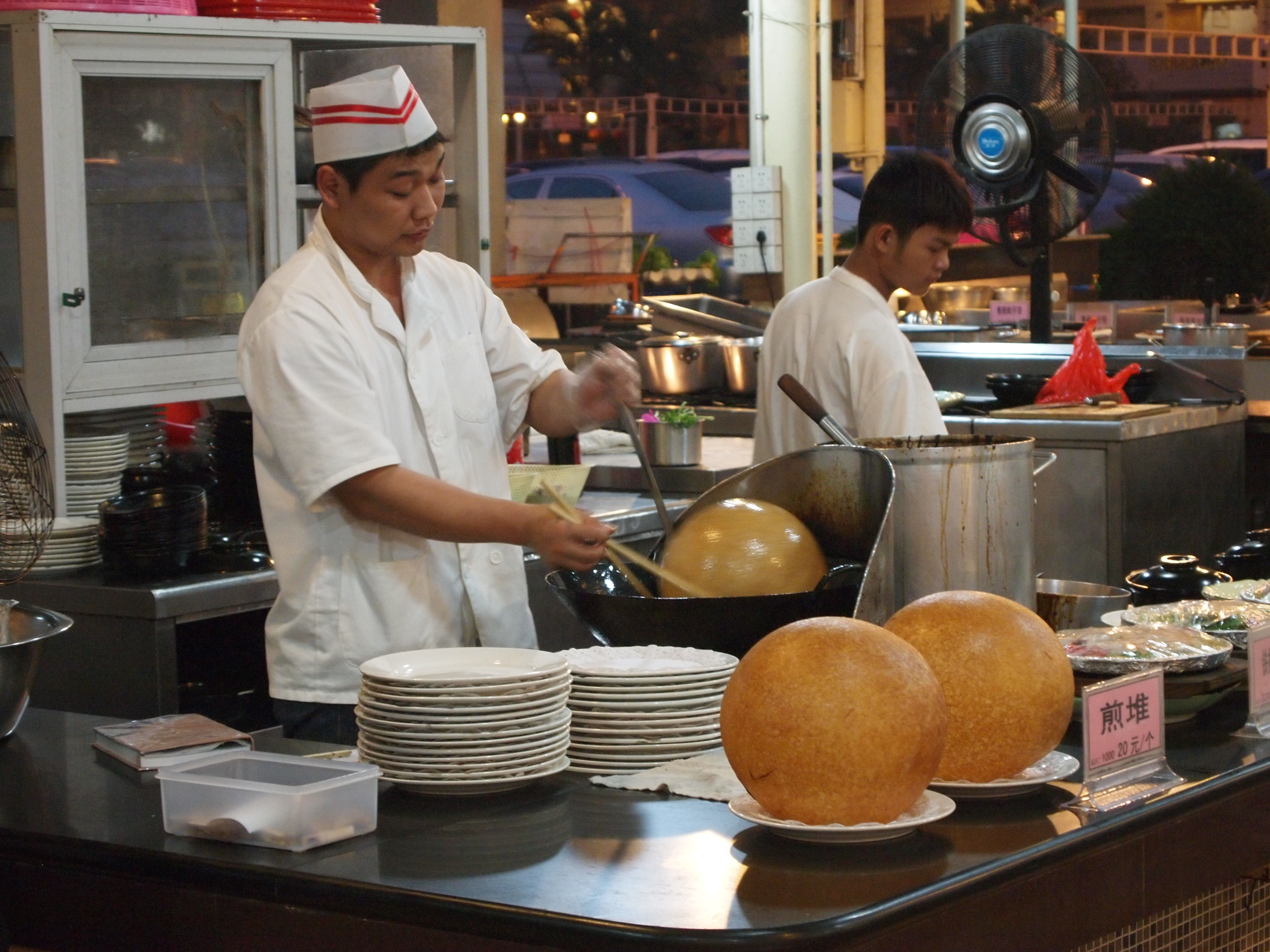
Jian dui can be fried to great sizes. The common misspelling 煎堆 can be seen on the sign in the photo.

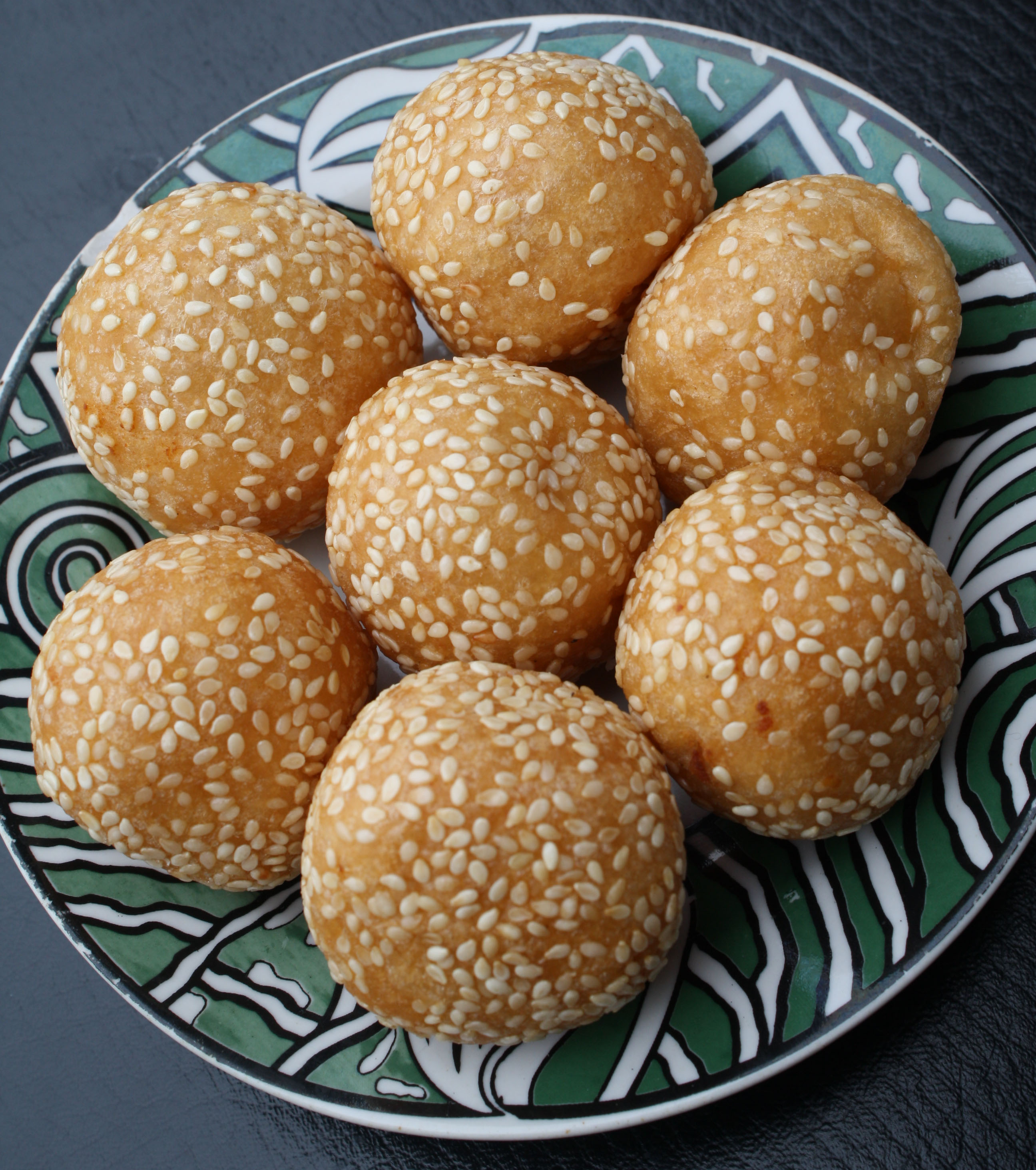

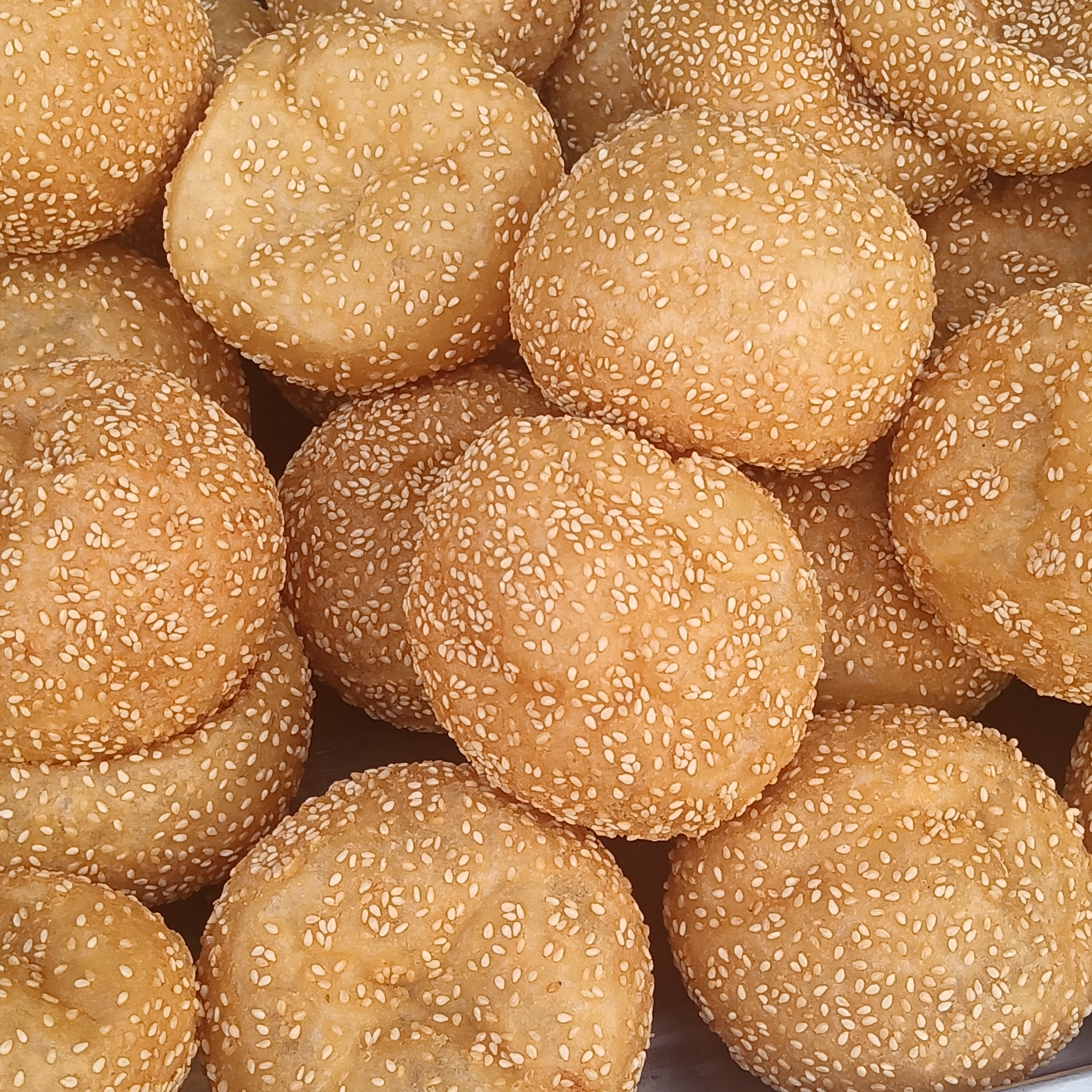

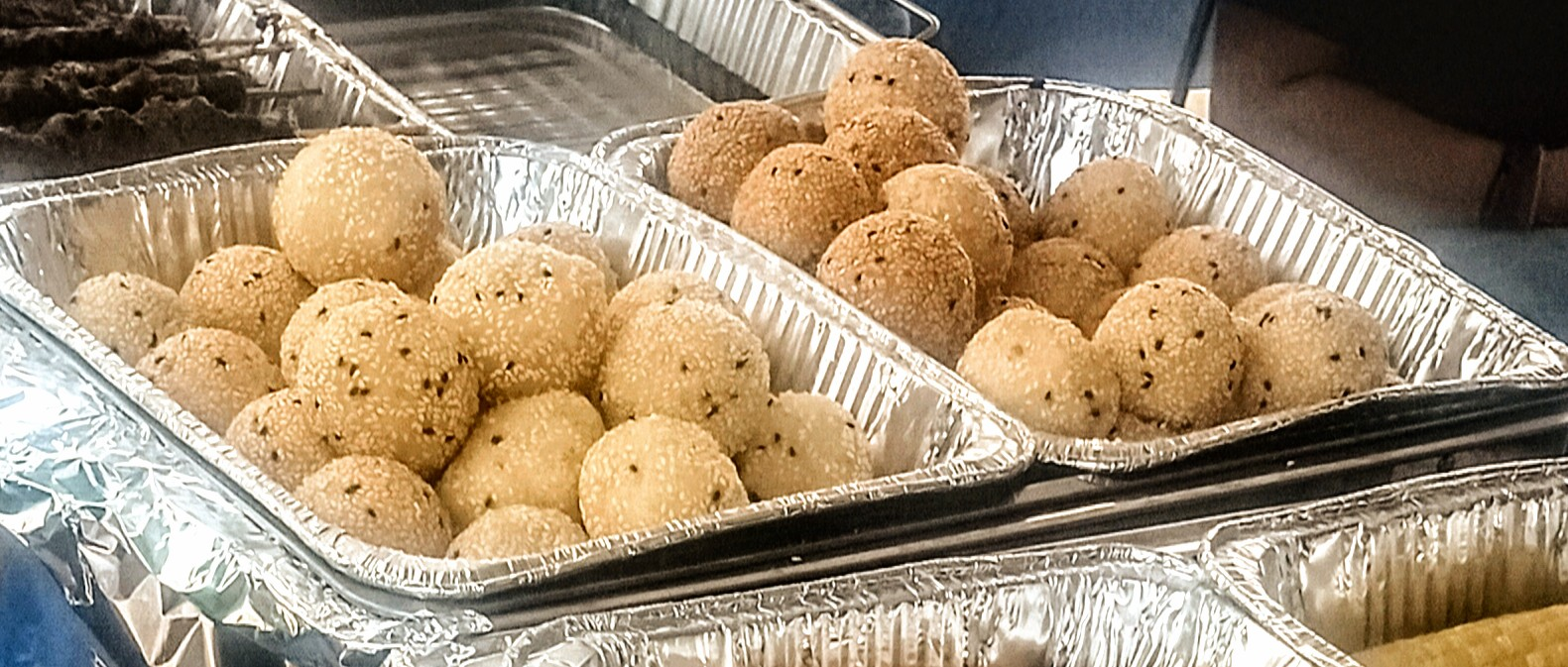
Cambodian num kroch at a market.

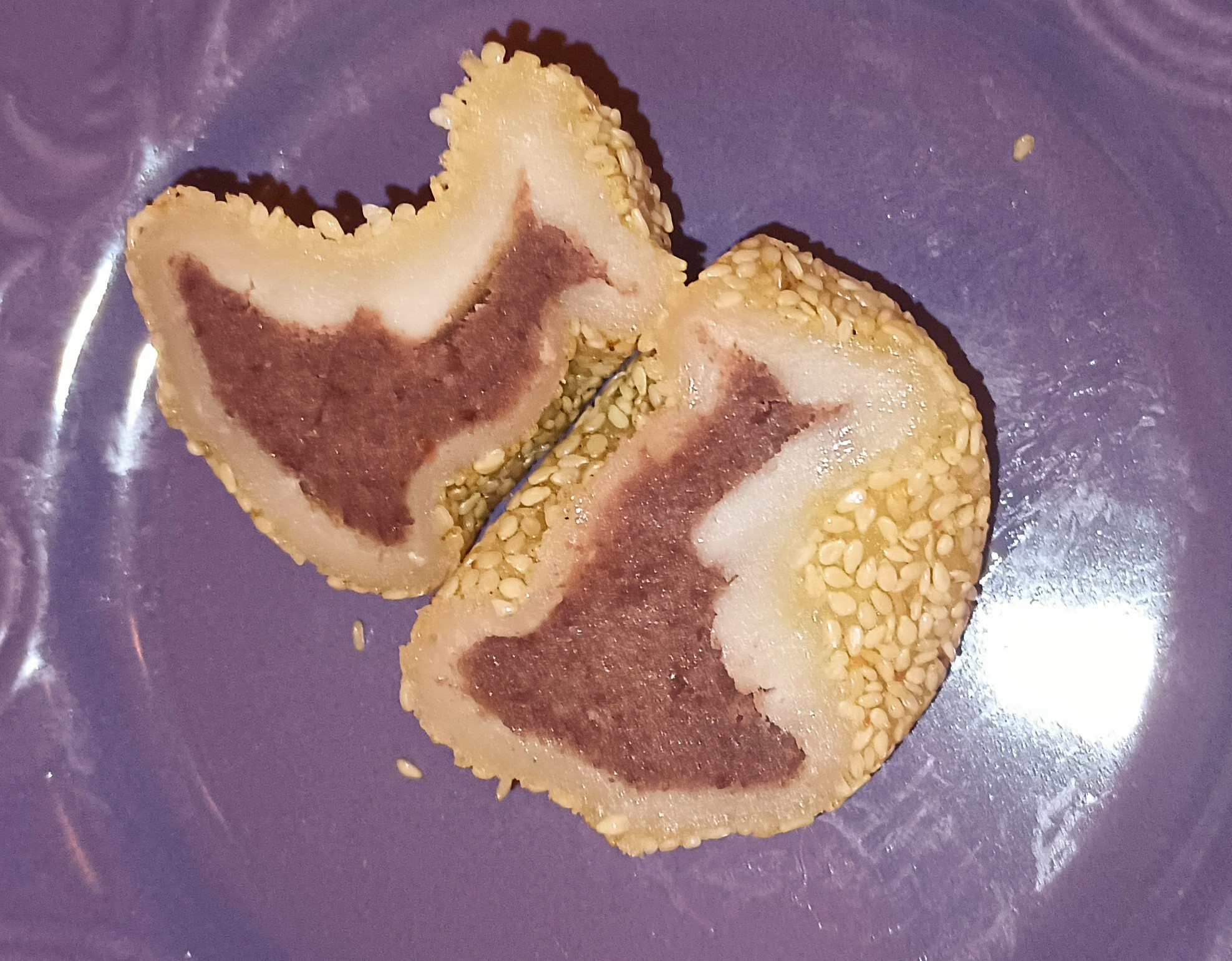
Mung bean filling inside Cambodian num kroch.

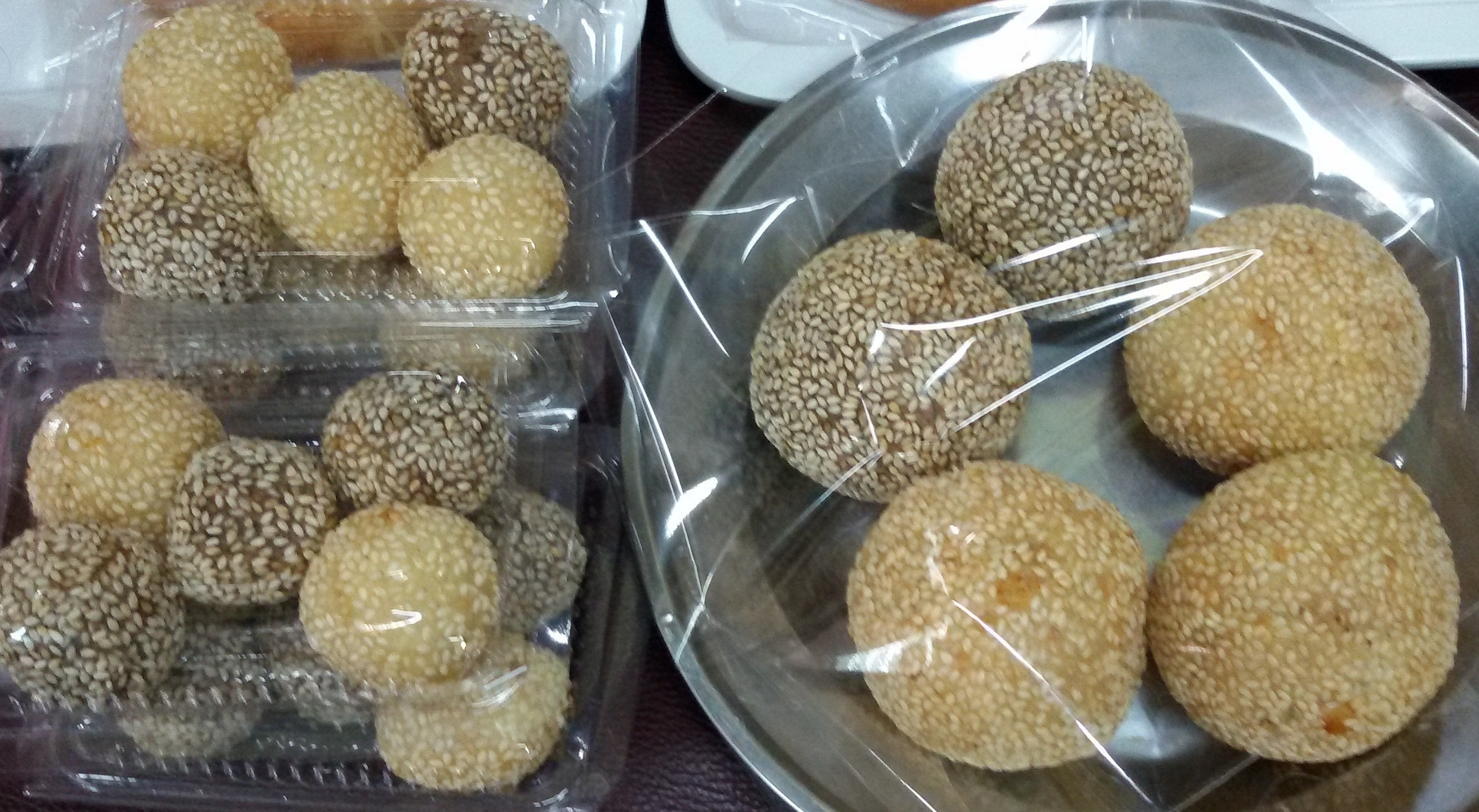
Onde-onde from Surabaya, Indonesia. The yellow ones were made from white glutinous rice flour while the black ones from black glutinous rice flour.

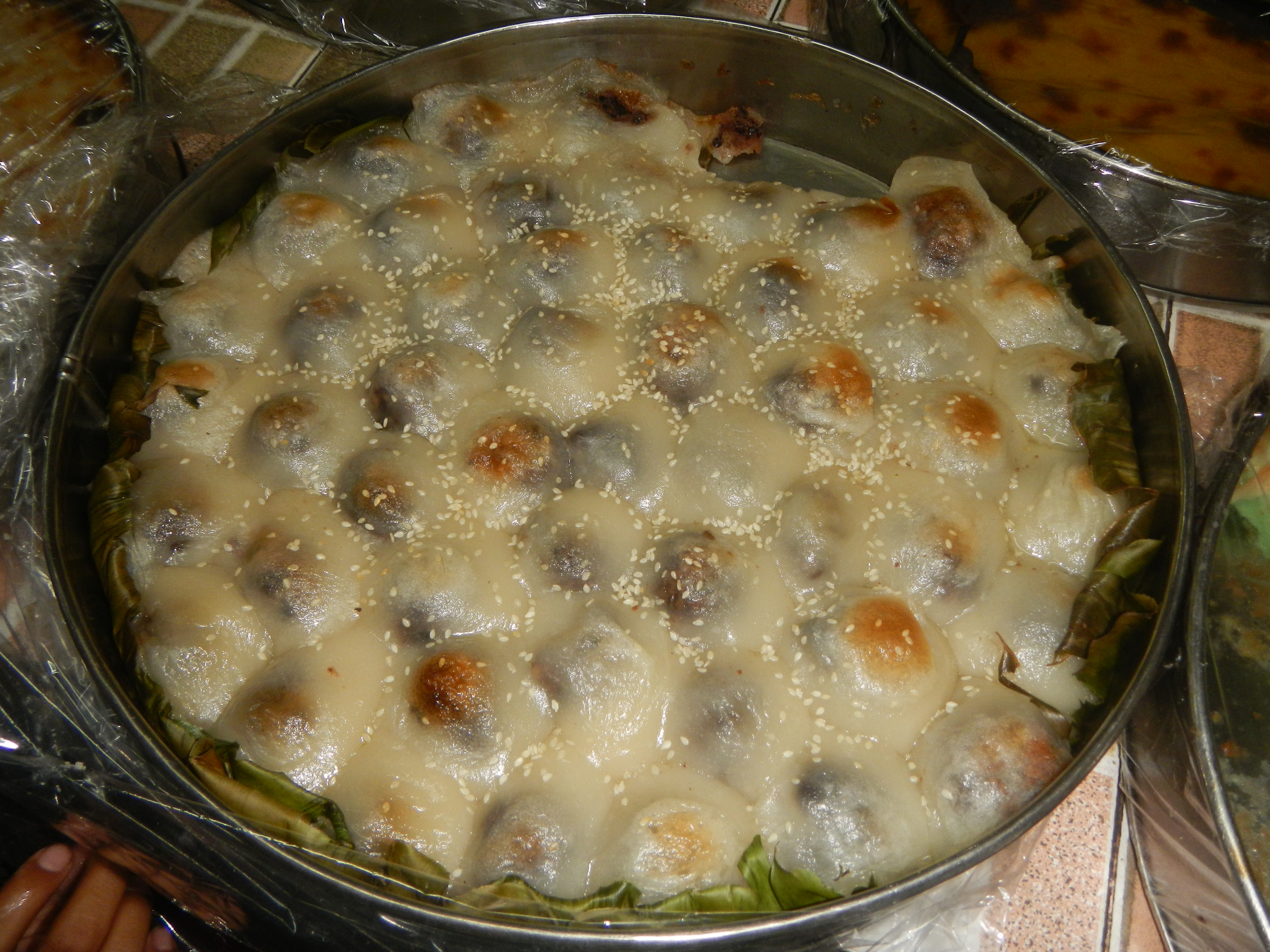
Moche from the Philippines, a boiled buchi variant with bean paste filling served with sweetened coconut milk sauce

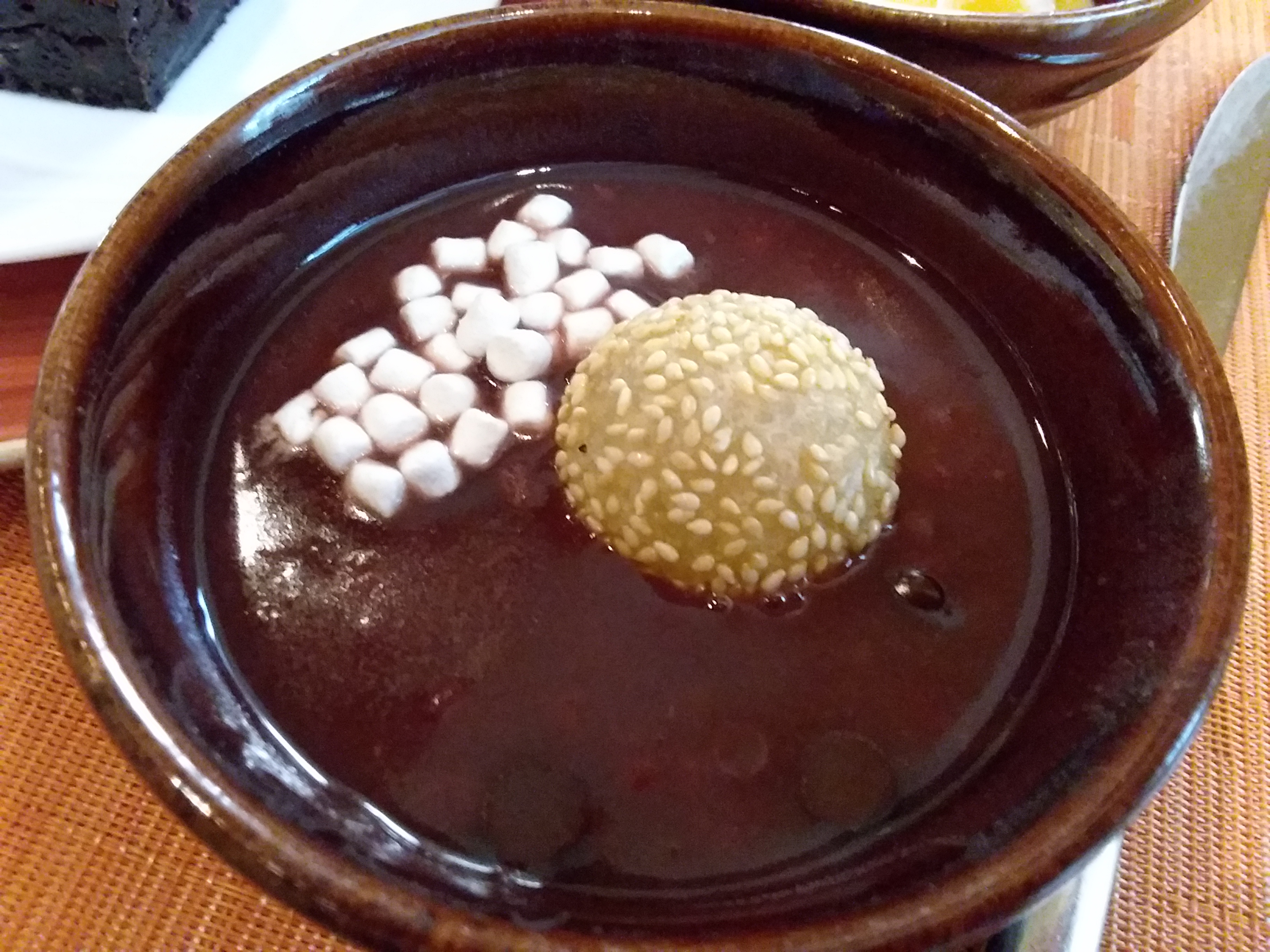
Jian dui with hong dou tang

== See also ==
- Bánh rán
- Benne ball
- Chapssal doughnut
- Dango
- Danja
- Dim sum
- List of sesame seed dishes
