= New Orleans =

Consolidated city-parish in Louisiana, US

New Orleans La Nouvelle-Orléans (French) Nouvèl-Òrléan (Louisiana Creole)
- Consolidated city-parish
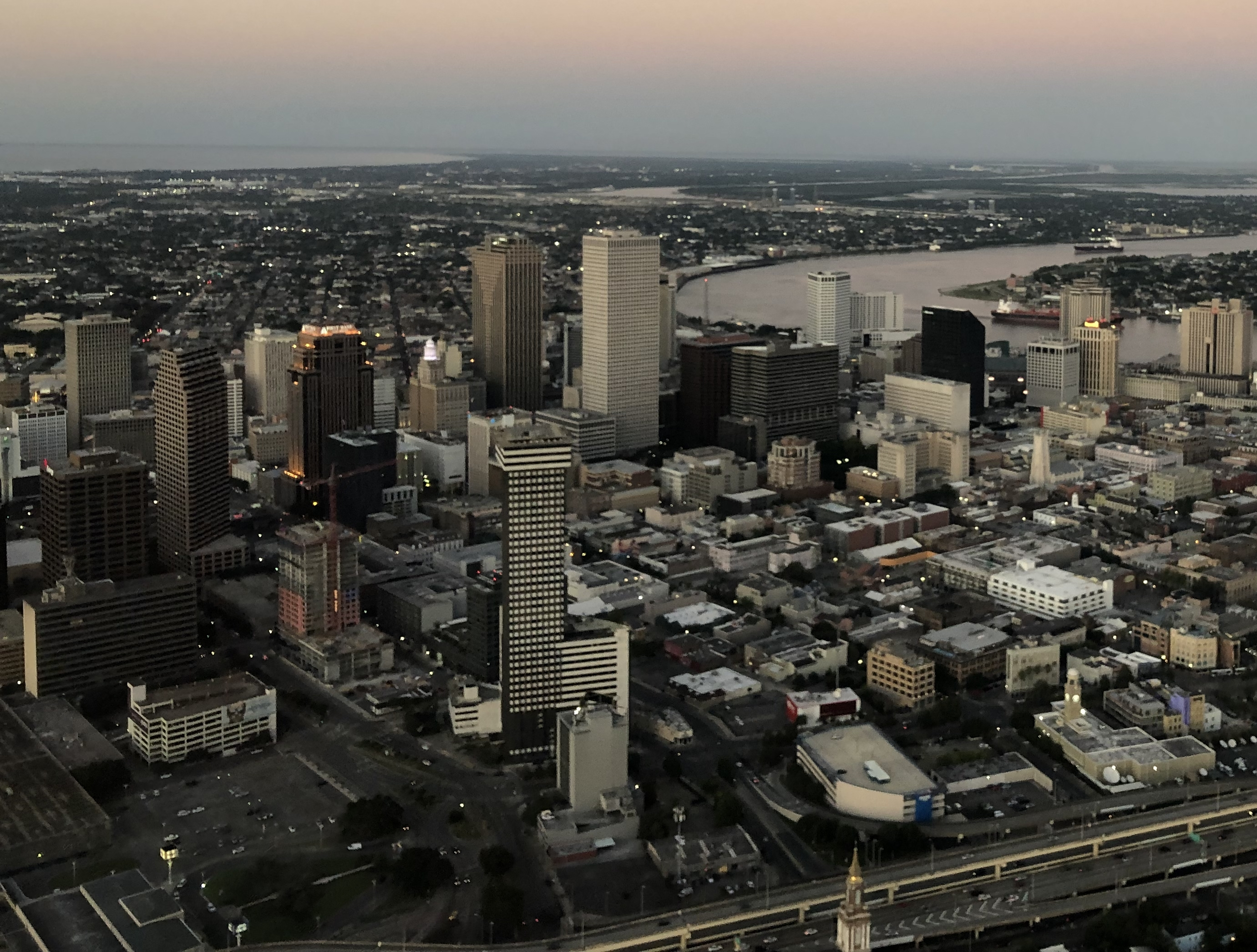
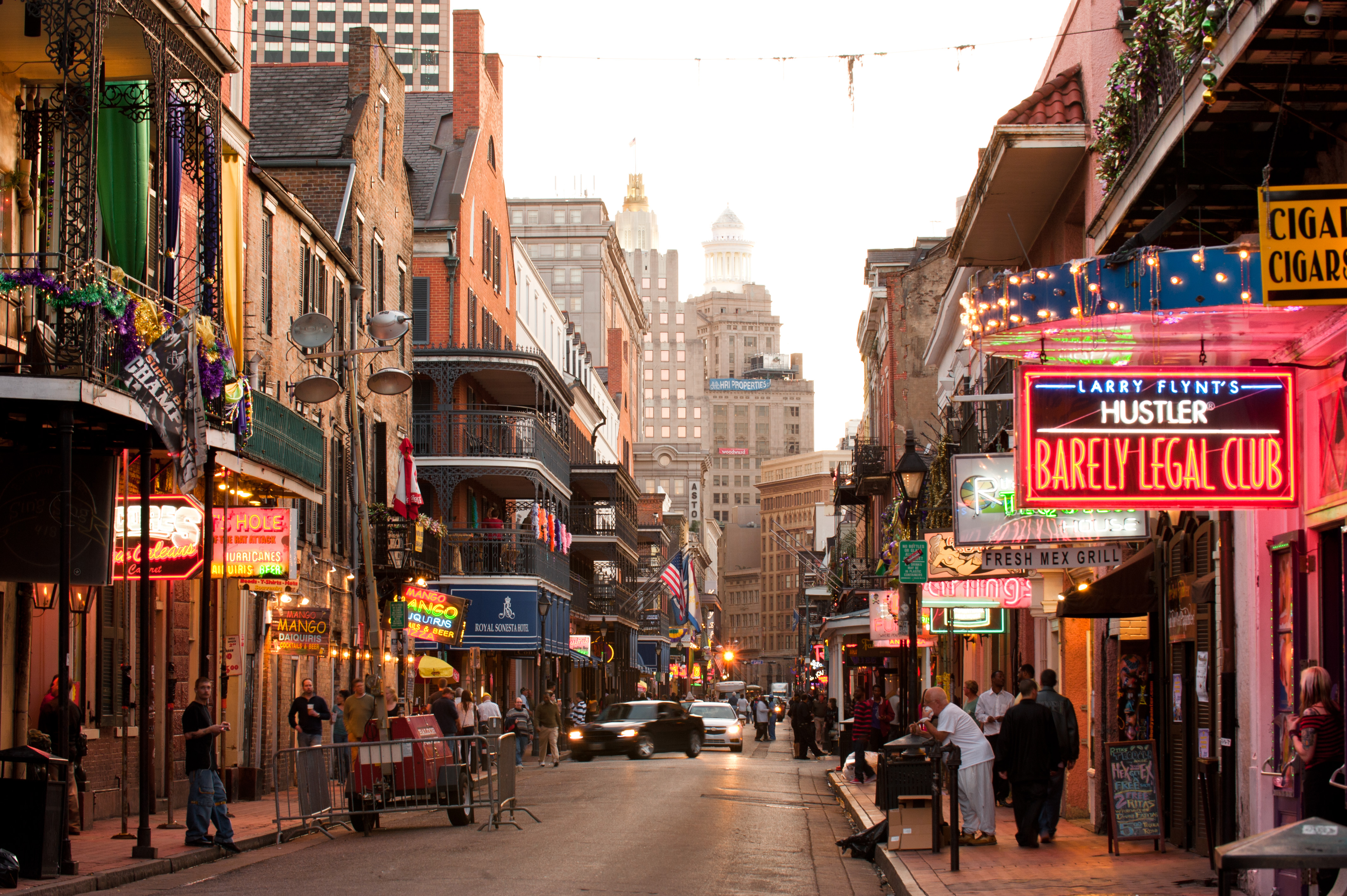
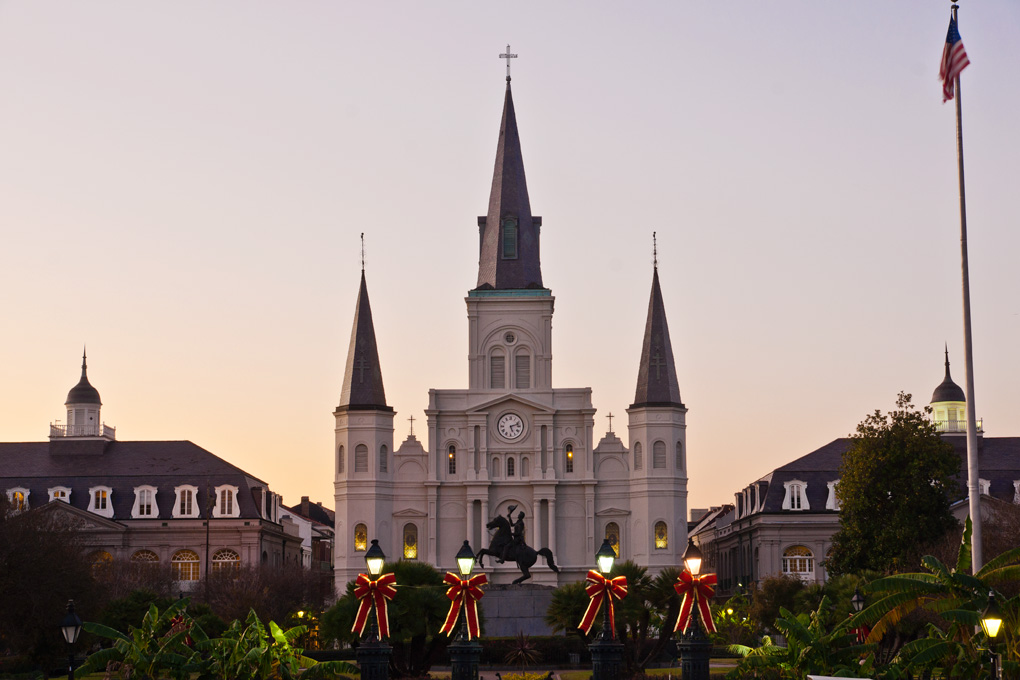
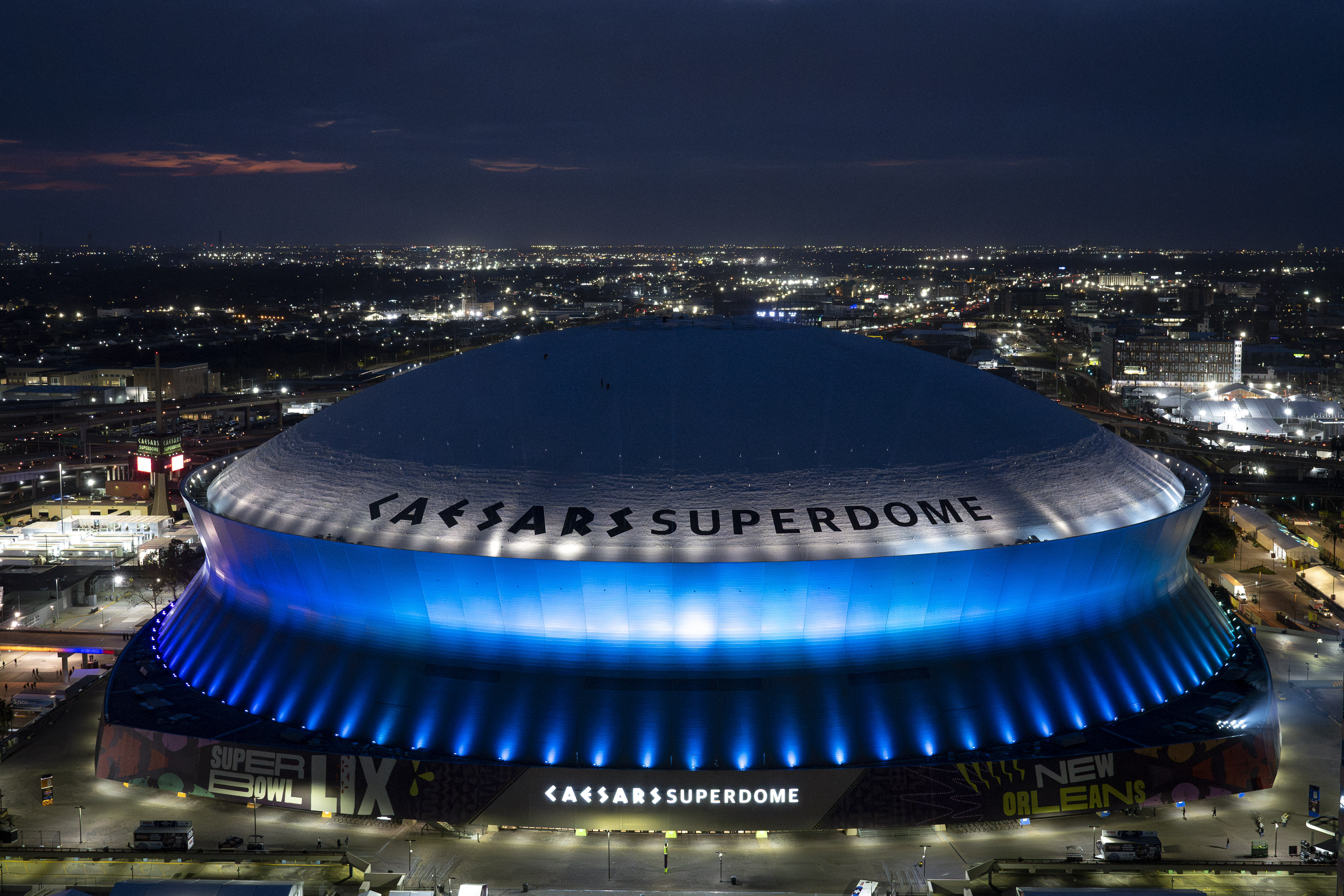
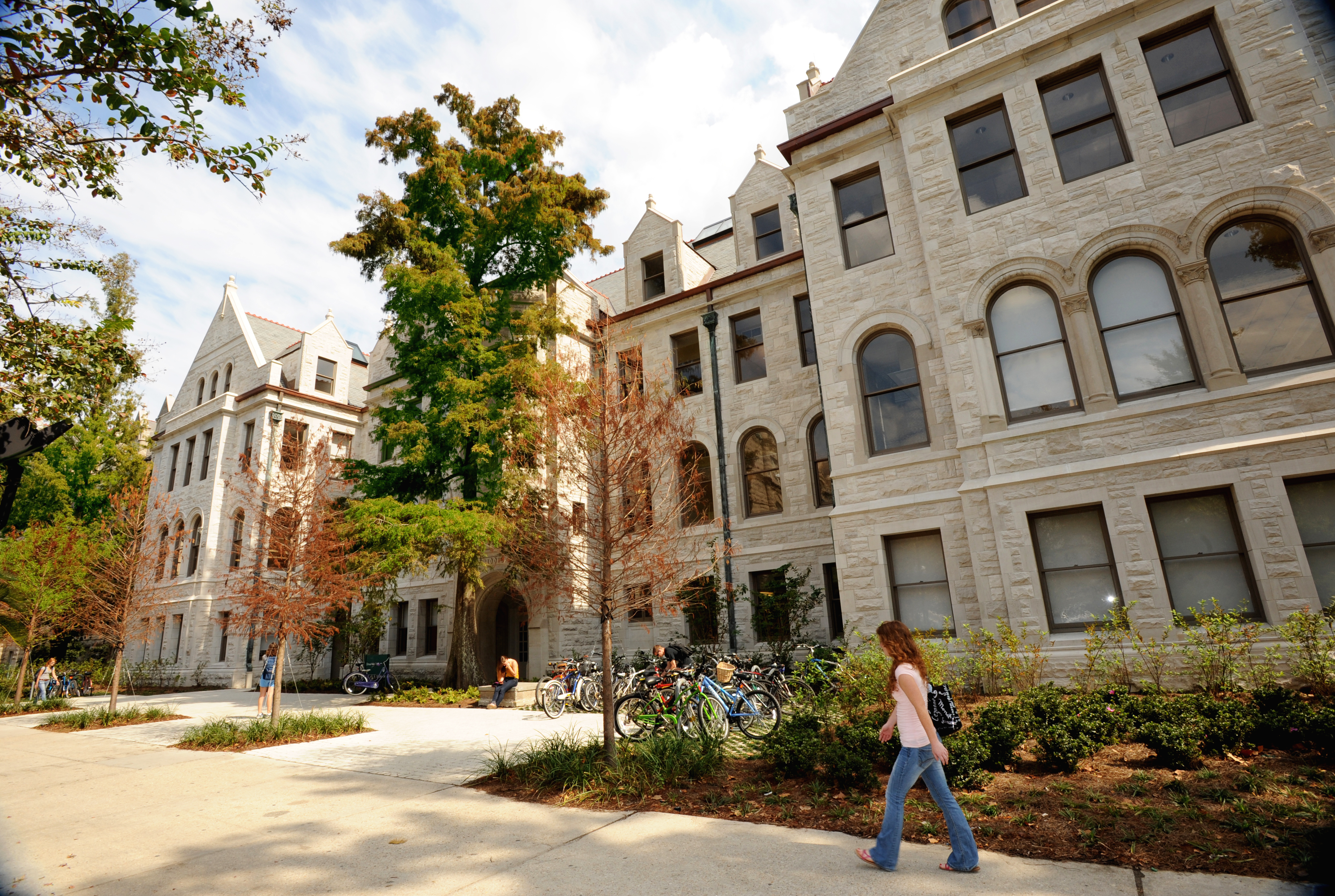
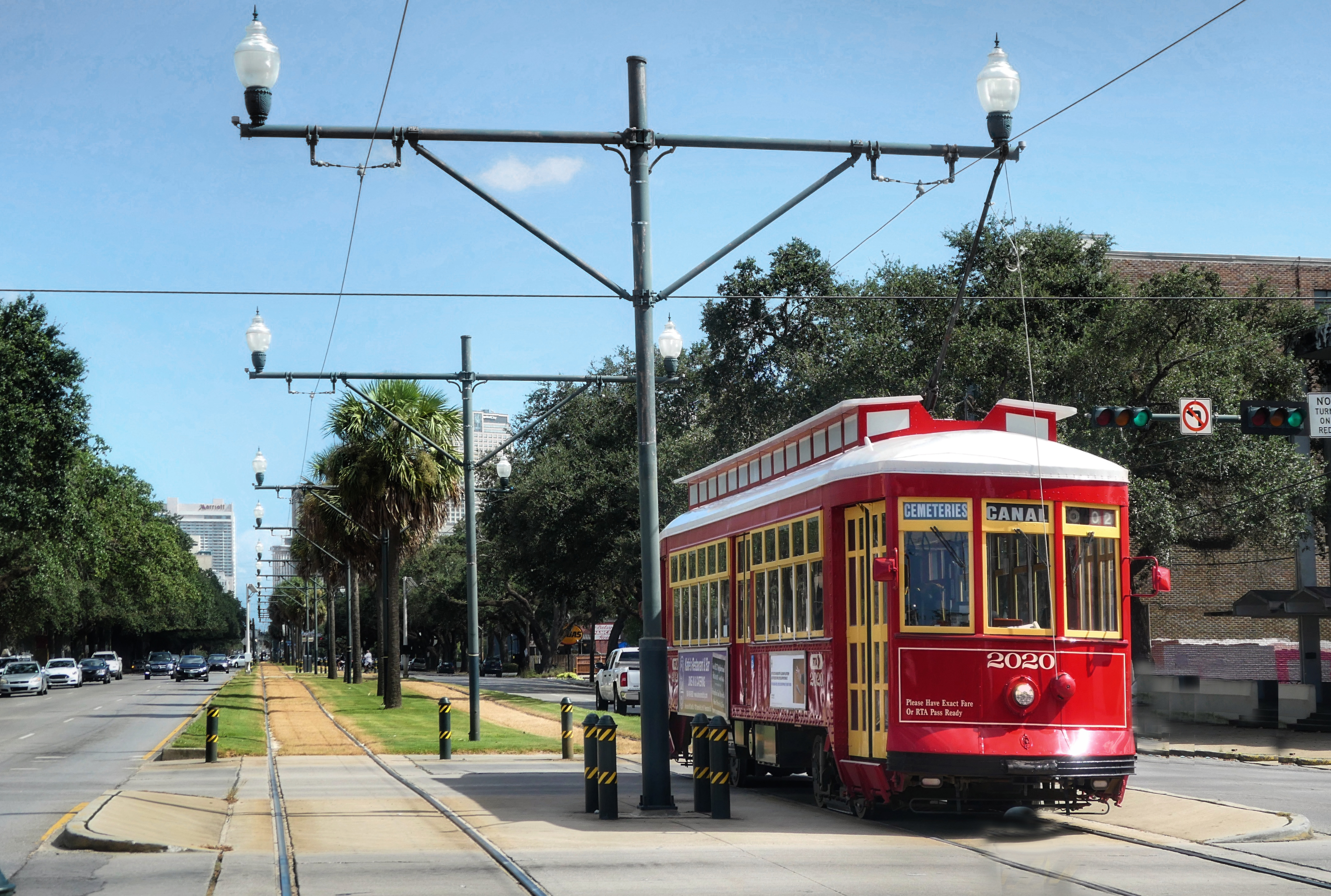
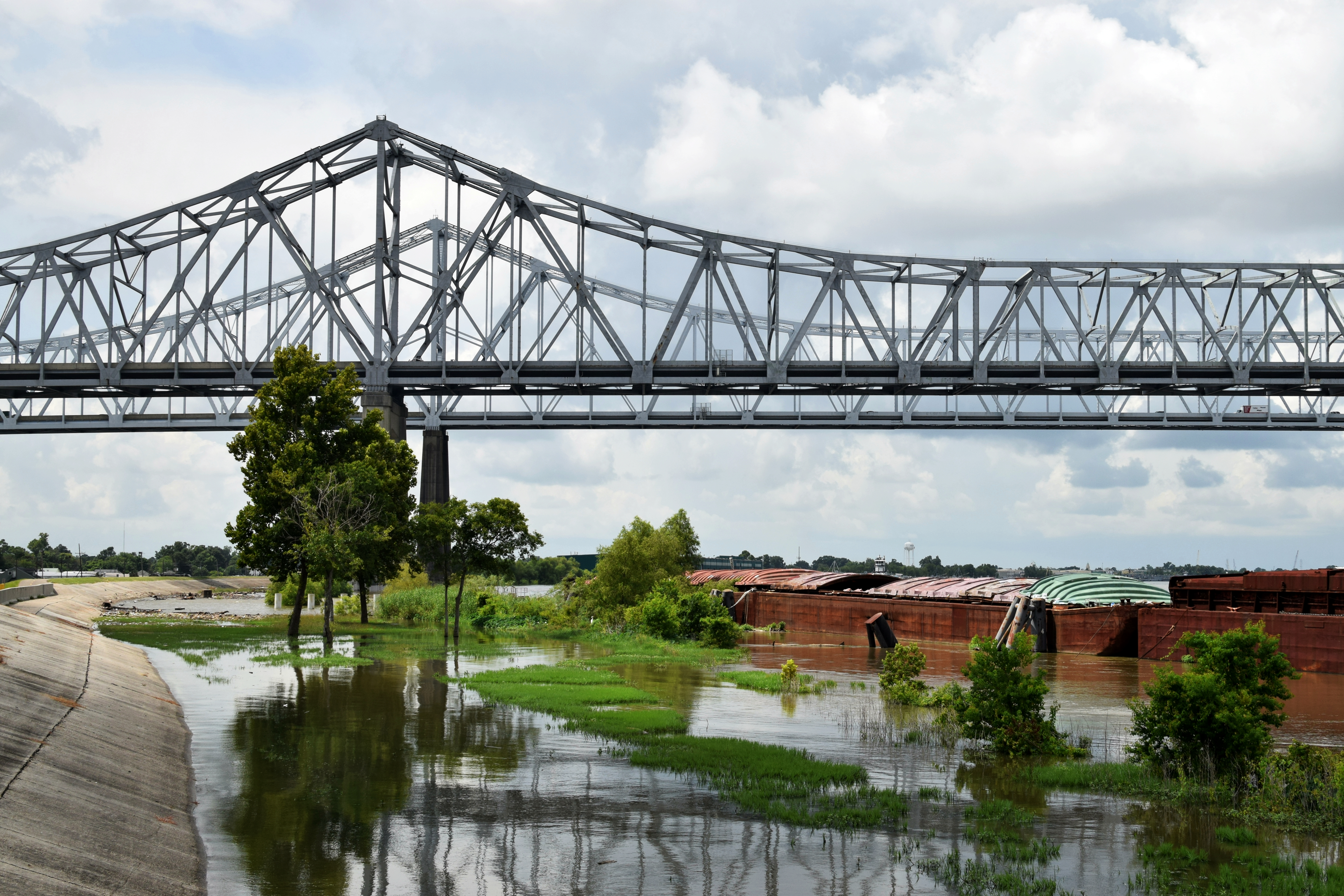
- Central Business District Bourbon Street St. Louis Cathedral Caesars Superdome Tulane University New Orleans streetcar Crescent City Connection

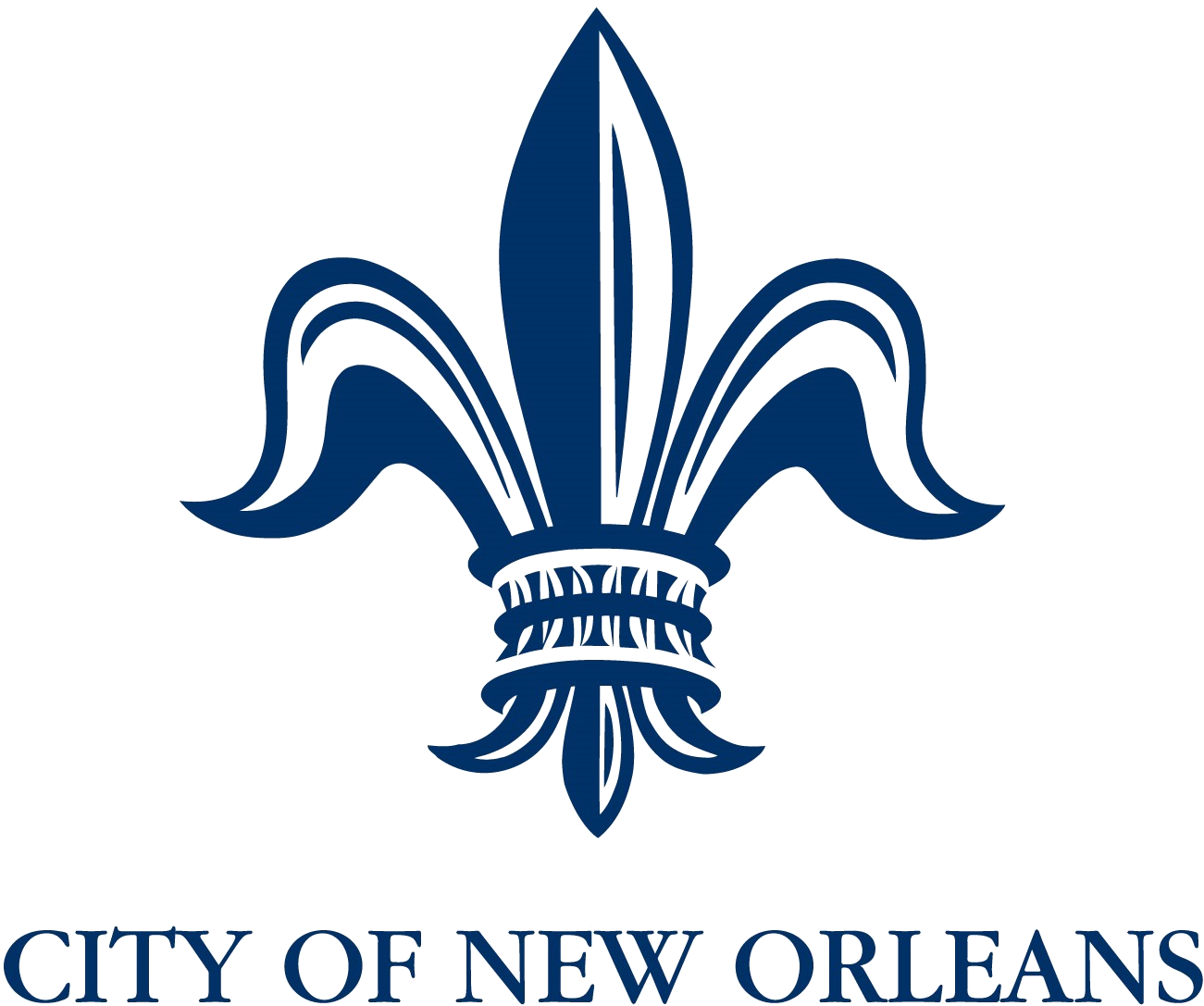
- Flag Seal Logo
- Nicknames: The Crescent City, The Big Easy, The City That Care Forgot, NOLA, The City of Yes, Hollywood South, The Creole City
- Interactive map of New Orleans
- Location within Louisiana Location within the United States
- Coordinates: 29°58′34″N 90°04′42″W
- Country: United States
- State: Louisiana
- Parish: Orleans (coterminous)
- Founded: 1718; 308 years ago
- Founder: Jean-Baptiste Le Moyne de Bienville
- Named for: Philippe II, Duke of Orléans (1674–1723)

Government
  - Type: Mayor–council
  - Mayor: Helena Moreno (D)
  - Council: New Orleans City Council

Area
  - Consolidated city-parish: 349.85 sq mi (906.10 km^{2})
  - Land: 169.42 sq mi (438.80 km^{2})
  - Water: 180.43 sq mi (467.30 km^{2}) 52%
  - Metro: 3,755.5 sq mi (9,726.6 km^{2})
- Elevation: −6.6 to 19.7 ft (−2 to 6 m)

Population (2020)
  - Consolidated city-parish: 383,997
  - Estimate (2025): 362,154 ▼
  - Density: 2,267/sq mi (875/km^{2})
  - Urban: 963,212 (US: 49th)
  - Urban density: 3,560/sq mi (1,376/km^{2})
  - Metro: 1,007,275 (US: 59th)
- Demonym: New Orleanian

GDP
  - Consolidated city-parish: $30.835 billion (2024)
  - Metro: $102.437 billion (2023)
- Time zone: UTC−6 (CST)
  - Summer (DST): UTC−5 (CDT)
- Area code: 504
- FIPS code: 22-55000
- GNIS feature ID: 1629985
- Website: nola.gov

New Orleans (Note: American English: /nuˈɔːrl(i)ənz/ noo OR-l(ee)ənz, /nuɔːrˈliːnz/ noo or-LEENZ, locally /nuˈɔːrlənz/ noo OR-lənz; French: La Nouvelle-Orléans, pronounced [la nuvɛlɔʁleɑ̃], (Louisiana) la Ville; Louisiana Creole: Nouvèl-Òrléan, Lavil, Envil; Spanish: Nueva Orleans) (commonly known as NOLA or The Big Easy, among other nicknames) is a consolidated city-parish located along the Mississippi River in the U.S. state of Louisiana. With a population of 383,997 at the 2020 census, New Orleans is the most populous city in Louisiana, the second-most populous in the Deep South (after Atlanta), and the twelfth-most populous in the Southeastern United States; the New Orleans metropolitan area, with about 1 million residents, is the 59th-most populous metropolitan area in the United States. New Orleans serves as a major port and commercial hub for the broader Gulf Coast region. The city is coextensive with Orleans Parish.

New Orleans is renowned for its distinctive music, Creole cuisine, unique dialects, and its annual celebrations and festivals, most notably Mardi Gras. The historic heart of the city is the French Quarter, known for its French and Spanish Creole architecture and vibrant nightlife along Bourbon Street.

Founded in 1718 by French colonists, New Orleans was once the territorial capital of French Louisiana before becoming part of the United States in the Louisiana Purchase of 1803. New Orleans in 1840 was the third most populous city in the United States, and it was the largest city in the American South from the Antebellum era until after World War II. The city has historically been very vulnerable to flooding, due to its high rainfall, low-lying elevation, poor natural drainage, and proximity to multiple bodies of water. State and federal authorities have installed a complex system of levees and drainage pumps in an effort to protect the city.

New Orleans was severely affected by Hurricane Katrina in late August 2005, which flooded more than 80% of the city, killed more than 1,300 people, and displaced thousands of residents, causing a population decline of over 50%. Since Katrina, major redevelopment efforts have led to a slight rebound in the city's population. Concerns have been expressed about gentrification and consequent displacement.

== Etymology and nicknames ==
Before the arrival of European colonists, the indigenous Choctaw people called the area of present-day New Orleans Bulbancha, which translates as "land of many tongues". It appears to have been a contraction of balbáha a̱shah, which means "there are foreign speakers". In his book Histoire de la Louisiane, Antoine-Simon Le Page du Pratz wrote that the indigenous name referred to the Mississippi River and that the use of the same name for the settlement relates to Native American concepts of the close interaction between rivers and their surrounding land.

The name of New Orleans derives from the original French name, La Nouvelle-Orléans, which was given to the city in honor of Philippe II, Duke of Orléans, who served as Louis XV's regent from 1715 to 1723. The French city of Orléans itself was originally known as civitas Aurelianorum, possibly named after one of the many Roman Emperors bearing the nomen gentilicum around that time, which later evolved into Orléans.

Following the defeat in the Seven Years' War, France formally transferred the possession of Louisiana to Spain, with which France had secretly signed the Treaty of Fontainebleau a year earlier, in the Treaty of Paris of 1763. The Spanish renamed the city Nueva Orleans (pronounced [ˌnweβa oɾleˈans]), which was used until 1800. The United States, which had acquired possession from France in 1803, anglicized the French name to New Orleans.

New Orleans has several nicknames, including these:

- Crescent City, alluding to the course of the Lower Mississippi River around and through the city.
- The Big Easy, possibly a reference by musicians in the early 20th century to the relative ease of finding work there.
- The City that Care Forgot, used since at least 1938, referring to the outwardly easygoing, carefree nature of the residents.
- NOLA, the acronym for New Orleans, Louisiana.

== History ==
=== French–Spanish colonial era ===
Historical claims

Kingdom of France 1718–1762
Spanish Empire 1762–1801
First French Empire 1801–1803
United States 1803–present

La Nouvelle-Orléans (New Orleans) was founded in the spring of 1718 by the French Mississippi Company under Jean-Baptiste Le Moyne de Bienville, on land traditionally inhabited by the Chitimacha people. The city was named for Philippe II, Duke of Orléans, then-regent of the Kingdom of France whose title derived from the French city of Orléans. As a colony, French Louisiana faced conflict with Native American tribes navigating rival European powers. In 1729, the Natchez revolt erupted with an attack on Fort Rosalie, resulting in the deaths of over 200 French colonists. Governor Étienne Perier launched a retaliatory campaign that effectively destroyed the Natchez people, but it soured relations between France and the territory's Native Americans leading directly into the Chickasaw Wars of the 1730s.

Native resistance continued into the 1740s under governor Pierre de Rigaud, marquis de Vaudreuil-Cavagnial, as tribes including the Chickasaw and Choctaw leveraged competing colonial interests. Raids intensified as French economic instability weakened colonial defenses, with some Chickasaw attacks reaching as far south as Baton Rouge. Meanwhile, labor shortages led the French colonists to turn to the Atlantic slave trade. By the early 1720s, enslaved Africans were arriving in significant numbers, and in 1724, the Code Noir formalized harsh laws governing their lives. A distinct Afro-Creole culture began to develop, blending African traditions with Catholicism and French language, giving rise to practices such as Louisiana Voodoo and the Louisiana Creole language.

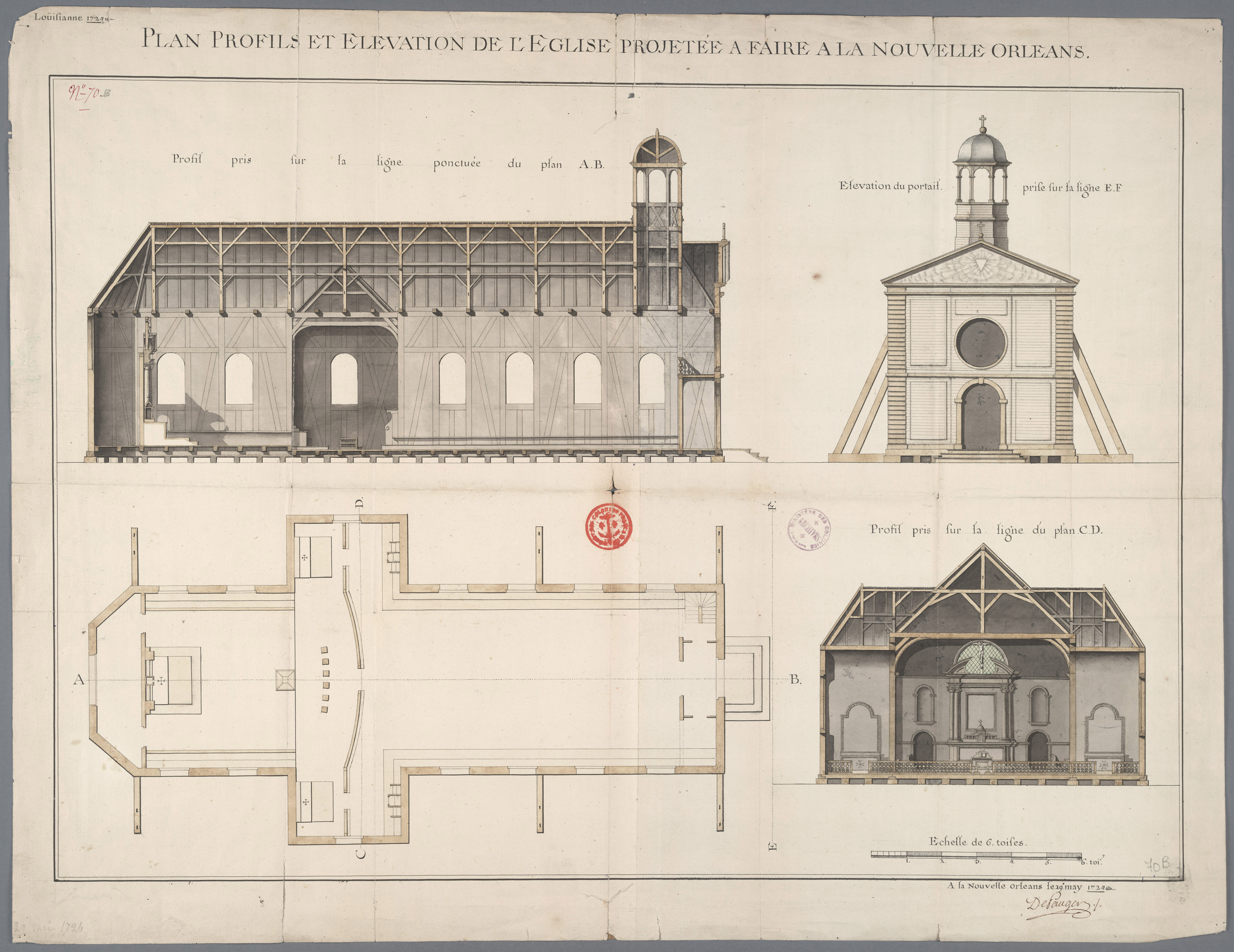
1724 plan for Saint Louis Parish Church, New Orleans, Louisiana, by Adrien de Pauger

New Orleans quickly emerged as a cultural and commercial hub in French Louisiana. Its position as a key port made it the gateway for goods moving between the interior of North America and the Atlantic world. Institutions like the Ursuline sisters, founded in 1727 by nuns sponsored by the Company of the Indies, reflected the city's integration into French religious and educational networks. The convent educated girls and remains foundational to several modern schools in the city. Early city planning and architecture were shaped by military engineers like Pierre Le Blond de Tour and Adrien de Pauger, whose designs laid out the enduring street grid and fortifications. By the 1740s, public works programs under engineer Ignace François Broutin transformed the city's architecture, blending colonial governance with a distinct Creole character.

After France ceded Louisiana to the Spanish Empire in the 1763 Treaty of Paris, New Orleans residents resisted Spanish rule. Local residents staged the Louisiana Rebellion of 1768, briefly seizing control of the city and sending a delegation to France to appeal for renewed French authority. Their efforts failed, and King Louis XV reaffirmed Spanish sovereignty. Nearly all of the surviving 18th-century architecture of the Vieux Carré (French Quarter) dates from the Spanish period, notably excepting the Old Ursuline Convent. During the American Revolutionary War, New Orleans played a key role as a supply hub for the American cause, particularly under Spanish governor Bernardo de Gálvez y Madrid, Count of Gálvez, who led a campaign against the British from the city in 1779. From the 1760s onward, Filipinos also began settling in the region.

=== United States territorial era ===
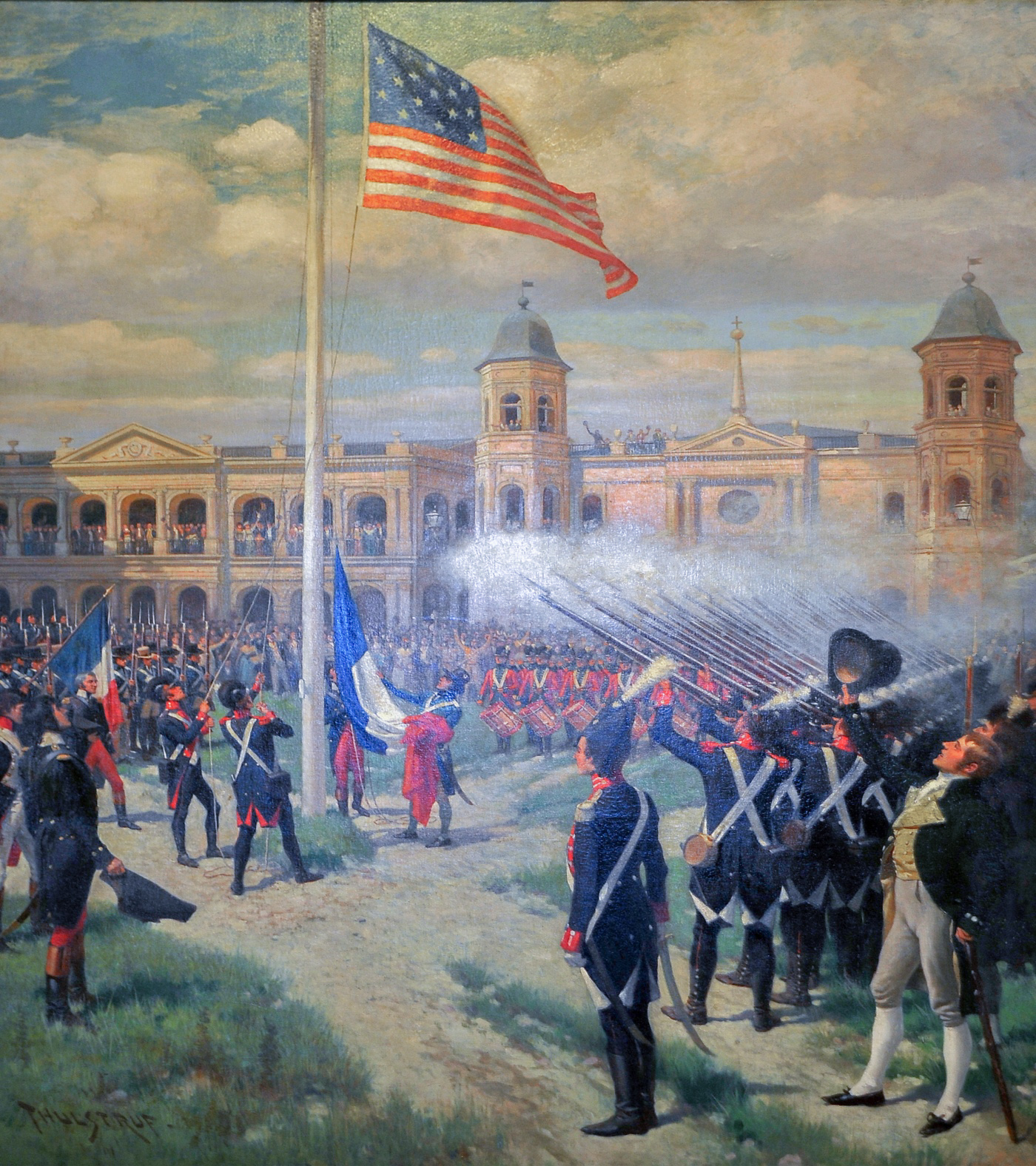
Flag raising in the Place d'Armes (now Jackson Square), New Orleans, after the Louisiana Purchase, marking the transfer of sovereignty over French Louisiana to the United States, December 20, 1803

The Third Treaty of San Ildefonso in 1800 restored French control of New Orleans and Louisiana, but Napoleon sold both to the United States in the Louisiana Purchase in 1803. Thereafter, the city grew rapidly with influxes of Americans, French, Creoles and Africans. Later immigrants were Irish, Germans, Poles and Italians. Major commodity crops of sugar and cotton were cultivated with slave labor on nearby large plantations.

Between 1791 and 1810, thousands of St. Dominican refugees from the Haitian Revolution, both whites and free people of color (affranchis or gens de couleur libres), arrived in New Orleans; a number brought their slaves with them, many of whom were native Africans or of full-blood descent. While Governor Claiborne and other officials wanted to keep out additional free black people, the French Creoles wanted to increase the French-speaking population. In addition to bolstering the territory's French-speaking population, these refugees had a significant impact on the culture of Louisiana, including developing its sugar industry and cultural institutions.

As more refugees were allowed into the Territory of Orleans, St. Dominican refugees who had first gone to Cuba also arrived. Many of the white Francophones had been deported by officials in Cuba in 1809 as retaliation for Bonapartist schemes. Nearly 90 percent of these immigrants settled in New Orleans. The 1809 migration brought 2,731 whites, 3,102 free people of color (of mixed-race European and African descent), and 3,226 slaves of primarily African descent, doubling the city's population. The city became 63 percent black, a greater proportion than Charleston, South Carolina's 53 percent at that time.

==== Slave rebellion ====
On January 8–11, 1811, about 500 enslaved Africans in St. Charles and St. John the Baptist parishes rose up in the German Coast rebellion against their enslavers, killing two white men in the process. They proceeded to march south toward New Orleans and were eventually controlled by the local militia, with numerous casualties on both sides. The uprising has been called the "largest slave rebellion in US history."

=== Battle of New Orleans and antebellum period ===
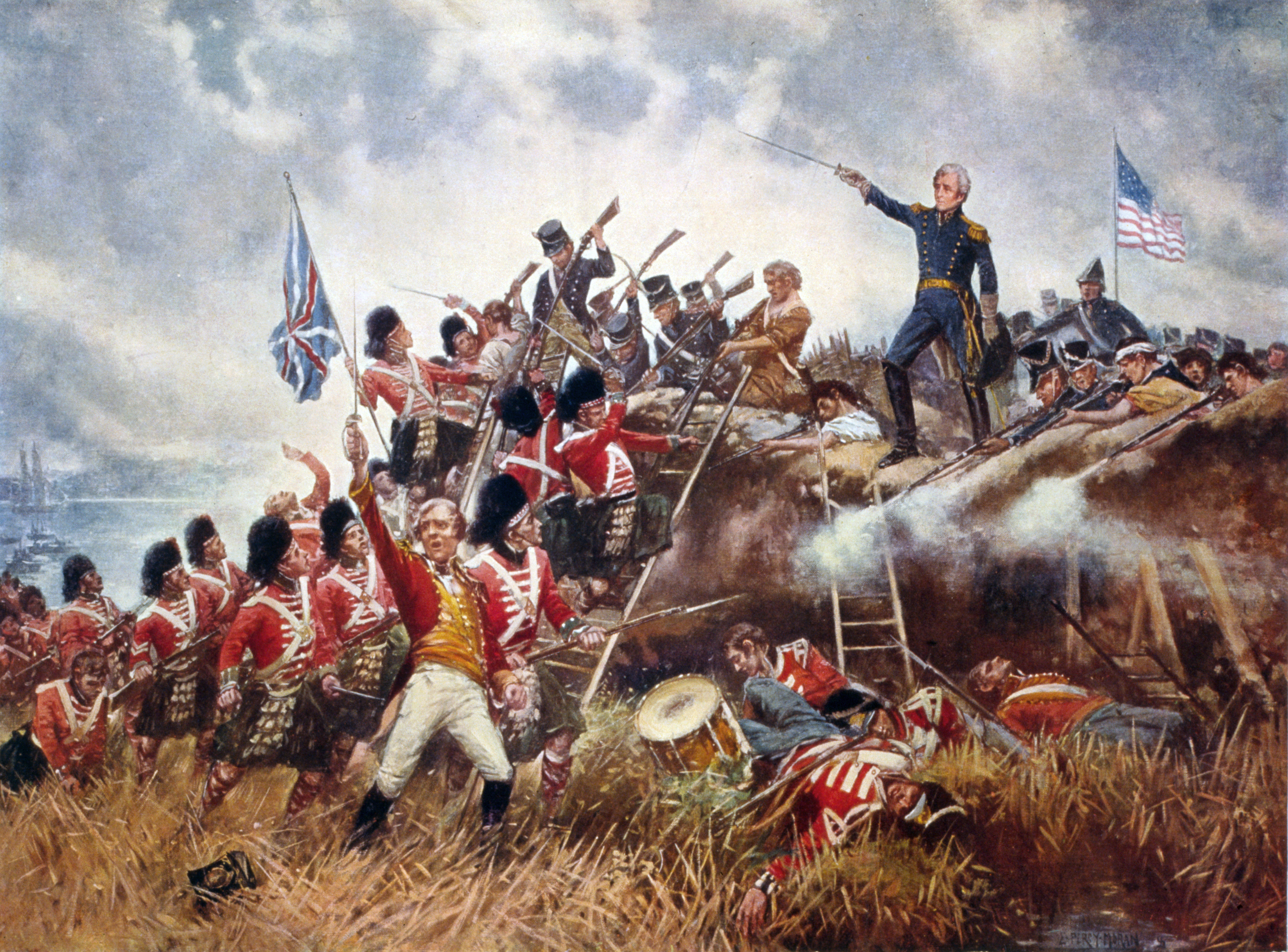
The Battle of New Orleans

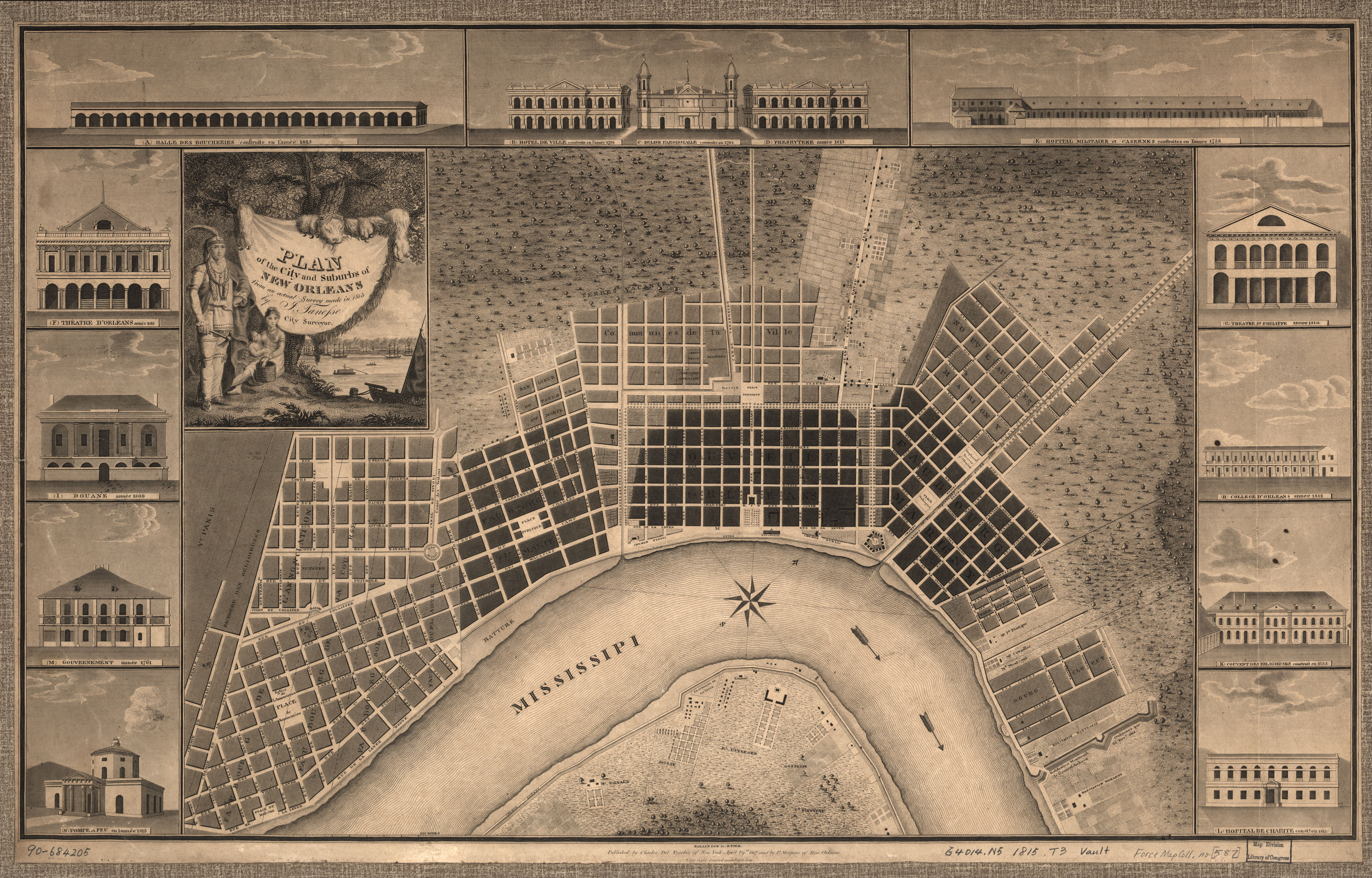
Plan of the city and suburbs of New Orleans: from a survey made in 1815

During the final campaign of the War of 1812, the British sent a force of 11,000 in an attempt to capture New Orleans. Despite great challenges, General Andrew Jackson, with support from the U.S. Navy, successfully cobbled together a force of militia from Louisiana and Mississippi, U.S. Army regulars, a large contingent of Tennessee state militia, Kentucky frontiersmen and local privateers (the latter led by the pirate Jean Lafitte), to decisively defeat the British in the Battle of New Orleans on January 8, 1815. The armies had not learned of the Treaty of Ghent, which had been signed on December 24, 1814 (although not ratified by the U.S. government until February 16, 1815). The fighting in Louisiana began in December 1814 and did not end until late January, after the Americans held off the Royal Navy during a ten-day siege of Fort St. Philip.

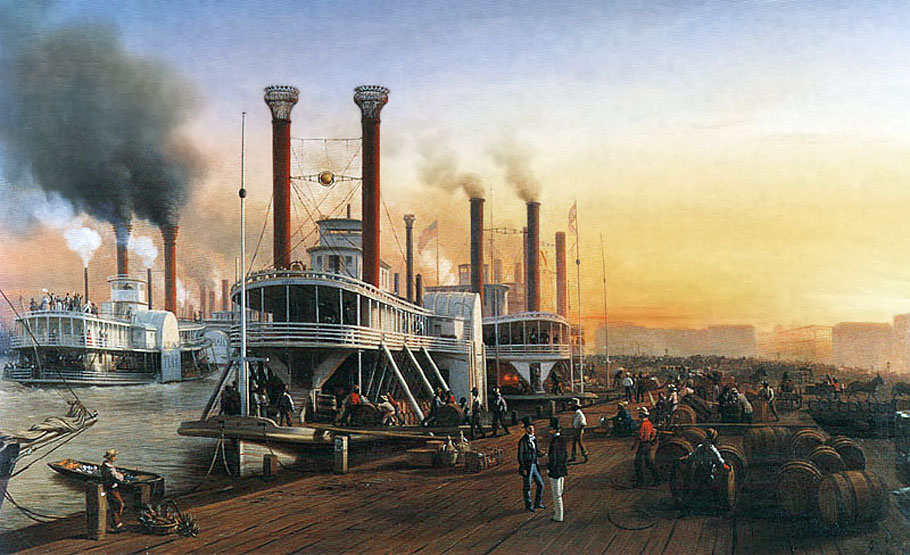
Mississippi River steamboats at New Orleans, 1853

As a port, New Orleans played a major role during the antebellum period in the Atlantic slave trade. The port handled commodities for export from the interior and imported goods from other countries, which were warehoused and transferred in New Orleans to smaller vessels and distributed along the Mississippi River watershed. The river was filled with steamboats, flatboats and sailing ships. Despite its role in the slave trade, New Orleans at the time also had the largest and most prosperous community of free persons of color in the nation, who were often educated, middle-class property owners.

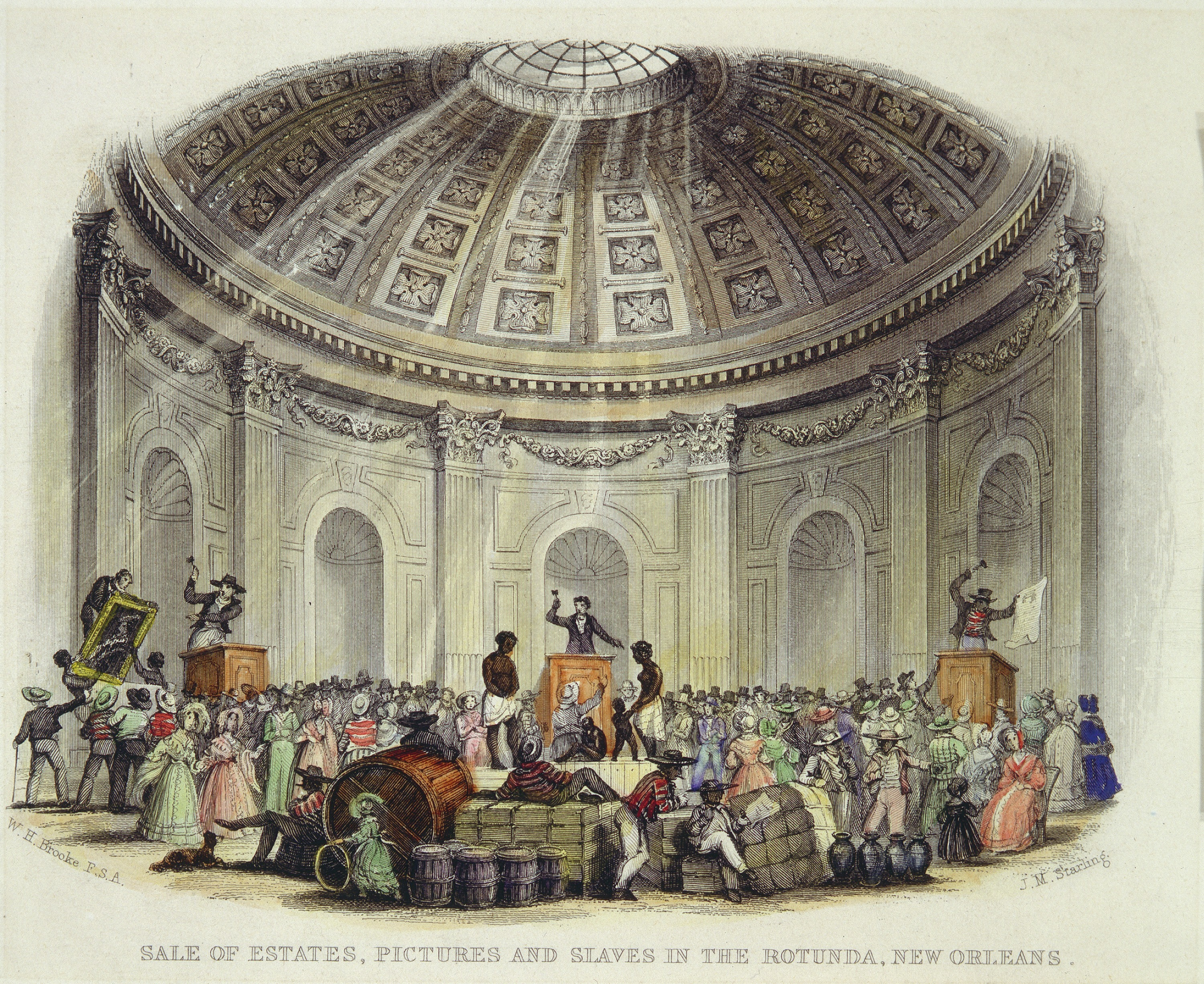
Sale of Estates, Pictures and Slaves in the Rotunda at New Orleans, 1842

New Orleans housed the largest slave market in the country, particularly after the U.S. ended the international slave trade in 1808. The domestic trade surged, with two-thirds of more than a million enslaved people forcibly relocated to the Deep South. The trade's economic value was immense as slaves were collectively valued at half a billion dollars, and the broader economy surrounding the trade, including transport and services, generated billions more. As a result, New Orleans benefited significantly, both financially and commercially, from this system.

Following the Louisiana Purchase, Anglo-Americans and later German and Irish immigrants migrated to the city, contributing to its rapid growth. By 1840, New Orleans was the wealthiest and third-most populous city in the U.S. The white Francophone population remained influential, with French still used in some schools. Free people of color (gens de couleur libres), mostly of mixed race and largely Francophone, formed a distinct artisan and professional class, even as the majority of black residents remained enslaved. The city's prosperity was shadowed by repeated epidemics of yellow fever and other tropical and infectious diseases, which killed over 150,000 residents in the 19th century. By 1860, the city's population had reached nearly 170,000, its per capita income was the second highest in the nation, and it was the third-largest U.S. port by import tonnage.

=== Civil War–Reconstruction era ===
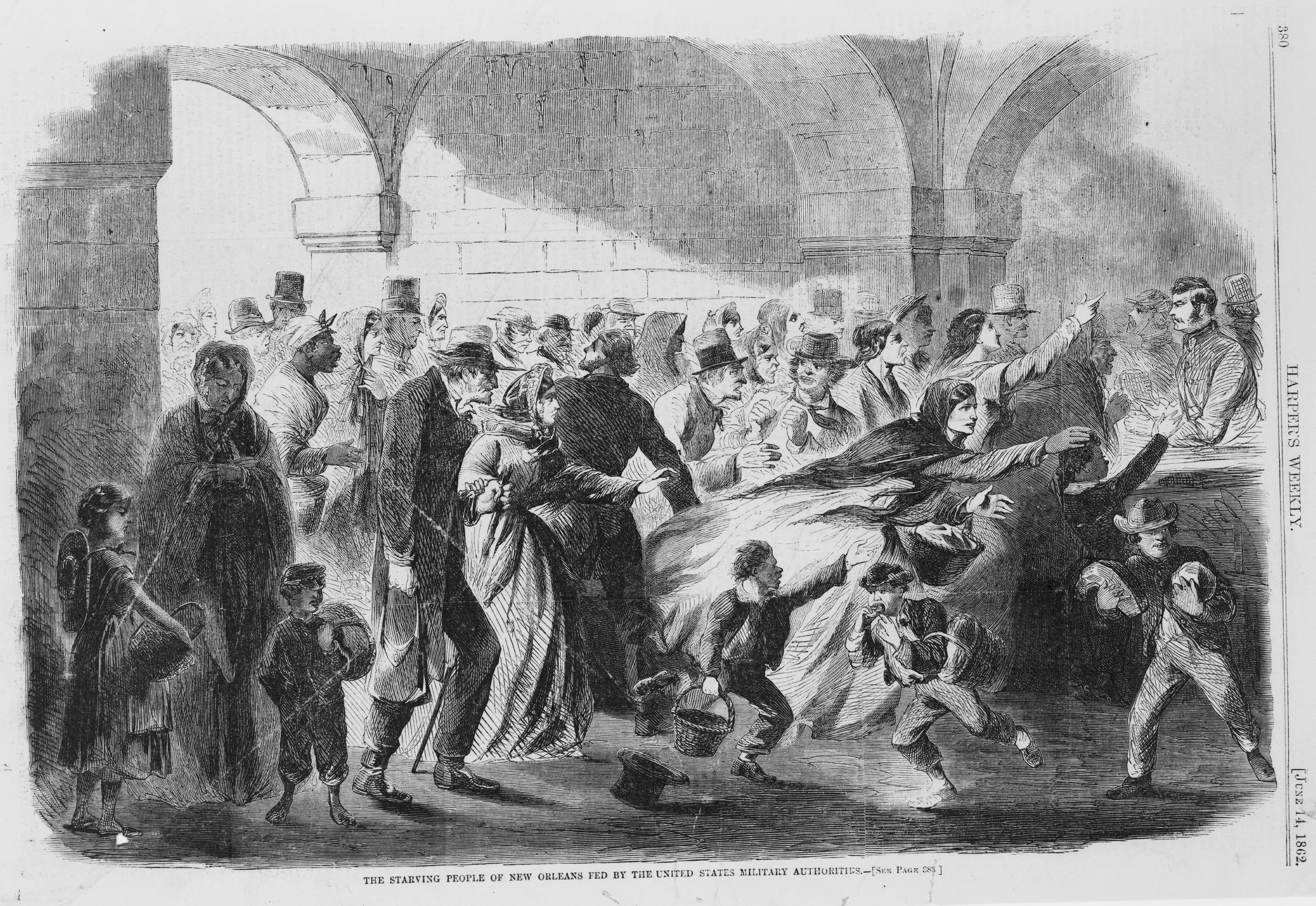
The starving people of New Orleans under Union occupation during the Civil War, 1862

As the Creole elite feared, the American Civil War changed their world. In April 1862, following the city's occupation by the Union Navy after the Battle of Forts Jackson and St. Philip, Gen. Benjamin F. Butler – a respected Massachusetts lawyer serving in that state's militia – was appointed military governor. New Orleans residents supportive of the Confederacy nicknamed him "Beast" Butler, because of an order he issued. After his troops had been assaulted and harassed in the streets by women still loyal to the Confederate cause, his order warned that such future occurrences would result in his men treating such women as those "plying their avocation in the streets", implying that they would treat the women like prostitutes. Accounts of this spread widely. He also came to be called "Spoons" Butler because of the alleged looting that his troops did while occupying the city, during which time he himself supposedly pilfered silver flatware.

Significantly, Butler abolished French-language instruction in city schools. Statewide measures in 1864 and, after the war, 1868 further strengthened the English-only policy imposed by federal representatives. With the predominance of English speakers, that language had already become dominant in business and government. By the end of the 19th century, French usage had faded. It was also under pressure from Irish, Italian and German immigrants. However, as late as 1902 "one-fourth of the population of the city spoke French in ordinary daily intercourse, while another two-fourths was able to understand the language perfectly," and as late as 1945, many elderly Creole women spoke no English. The last major French language newspaper, L'Abeille de la Nouvelle-Orléans (New Orleans Bee), ceased publication on December 27, 1923, after 96 years. According to some sources, Le Courrier de la Nouvelle Orléans continued until 1955.

As the city was captured and occupied early in the war, it was spared the destruction through warfare suffered by many other cities of the American South. The Union Army eventually extended its control north along the Mississippi River and along the coastal areas. As a result, most of the southern portion of Louisiana was originally exempted from the liberating provisions of the 1863 Emancipation Proclamation issued by President Abraham Lincoln. Large numbers of rural ex-slaves and some free people of color from the city volunteered for the first regiments of Black troops in the War. Led by Brigadier General Daniel Ullman (1810–1892), of the 78th Regiment of New York State Volunteers Militia, they were known as the "Corps d'Afrique". While that name had been used by a militia before the war, that group was composed of free people of color. The new group was made up mostly of former slaves. They were supplemented in the last two years of the War by newly organized United States Colored Troops, who played an increasingly important part in the war.

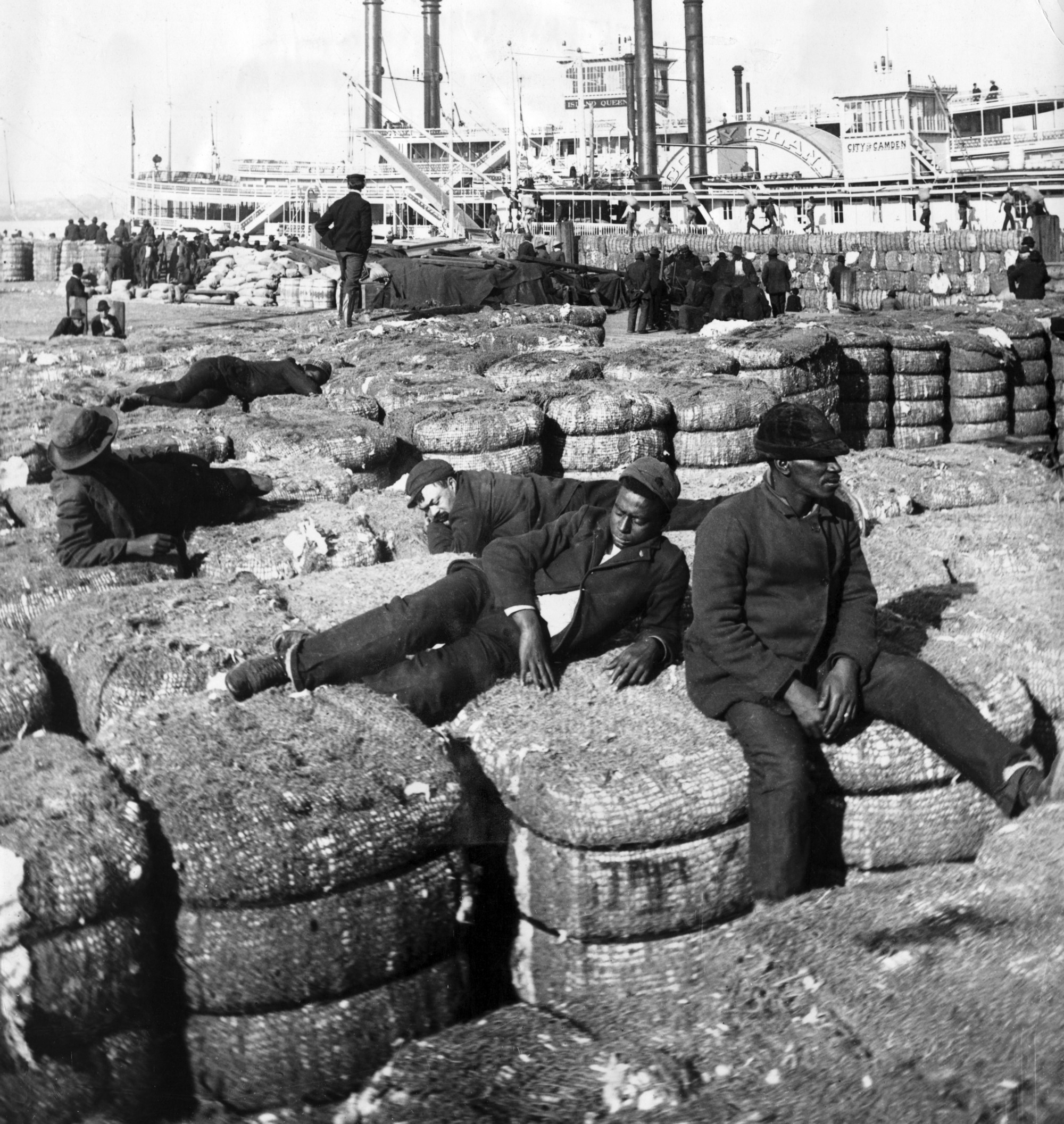
Black and white dockworkers resting on cotton bales

Violence in the South, including the Memphis Riots and New Orleans Riot of 1866, spurred Congress to pass the Reconstruction Act and Fourteenth Amendment, granting citizenship and civil rights to freedmen and free people of color. During Reconstruction, Louisiana and Texas were governed under the Fifth Military District, and Louisiana was readmitted to the Union in 1868 with a new constitution that established universal male suffrage, universal public education, and elected both black and white officials. P.B.S. Pinchback briefly served as Louisiana's Republican governor in 1872, becoming the first U.S. governor of African descent. New Orleans also maintained a racially integrated public school system during this period. However, wartime destruction, a financial recession, and the Panic of 1873 hindered economic recovery. From 1868, white insurgents used violence to suppress Black voters and disrupt Republican gatherings, culminating in the 1872 contested gubernatorial election and the rise of the "White League", a paramilitary group supporting Democrats. In 1874, they seized state offices during the Battle of Liberty Place, and by 1876, Redeemers had reclaimed the state legislature. Federal troops withdrew in 1877, ending Reconstruction. In 1892 the racially integrated unions of New Orleans led a general strike in the city from November 8 to 12, shutting down the city & winning the vast majority of their demands.

=== Jim Crow era ===
Dixiecrats and Democrats passed Jim Crow laws, establishing racial segregation in public facilities. In 1889, the legislature passed a constitutional amendment incorporating a "grandfather clause" that effectively disfranchised freedmen as well as the propertied people of color manumitted before the war. Unable to vote, African Americans could not serve on juries or in local office, and were closed out of formal politics for generations. The Southern U.S. was ruled by a white Democratic Party. Public schools were racially segregated and remained so until 1960.

New Orleans's large community of well-educated, often French-speaking free persons of color (gens de couleur libres), who had been free prior to the Civil War, fought against Jim Crow. They organized the Comité des Citoyens (Citizens Committee) to work for civil rights. As part of their legal campaign, they recruited one of their own, Homer Plessy, to test whether Louisiana's newly enacted Separate Car Act was constitutional. Plessy boarded a commuter train departing New Orleans for Covington, Louisiana, sat in the car reserved for whites only, and was arrested. The case resulting from this incident, Plessy v. Ferguson, was heard by the U.S. Supreme Court in 1896. The court ruled that "separate but equal" accommodations were constitutional, effectively upholding Jim Crow measures.

In practice, African-American public schools and facilities were underfunded across the South. The Supreme Court ruling contributed to this period as the nadir of race relations in the United States. The rate of lynchings of black men was high across the South, as other states also disfranchised blacks and sought to impose Jim Crow. Nativist prejudices also surfaced. Anti-Italian sentiment in 1891 contributed to the lynchings of 11 Italians, some of whom had been acquitted of the murder of the police chief. Some were shot and killed in the jail where they were detained. It was the largest mass lynching in U.S. history. In July 1900 the city was swept by white mobs rioting after Robert Charles, a young African American, killed a policeman and temporarily escaped. The mob killed him and an estimated 20 other blacks; seven whites died in the days-long conflict, until a state militia suppressed it.

=== 20th century ===
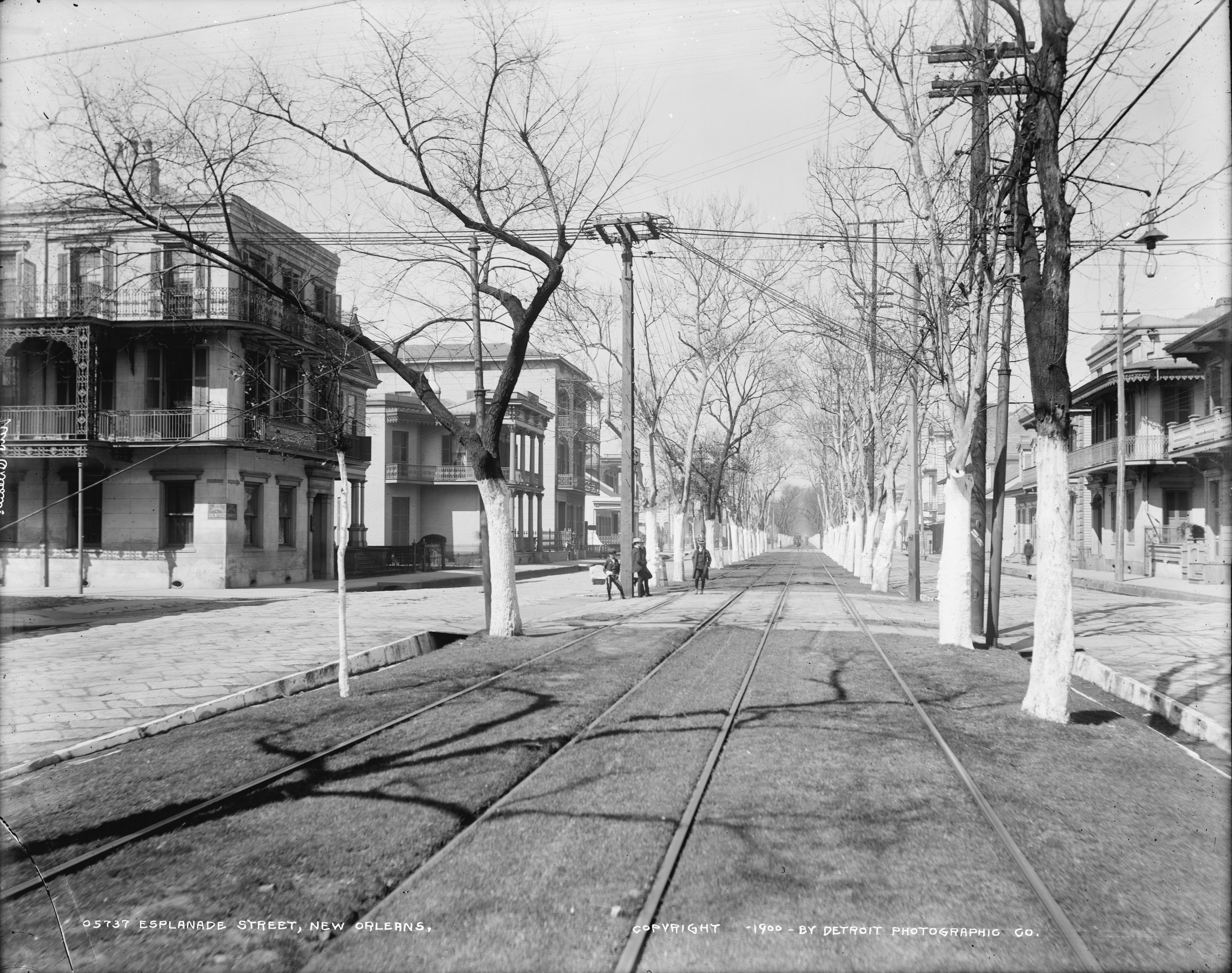
Esplanade Avenue at Burgundy Street, looking lakewards (north) towards Lake Pontchartrain in 1900

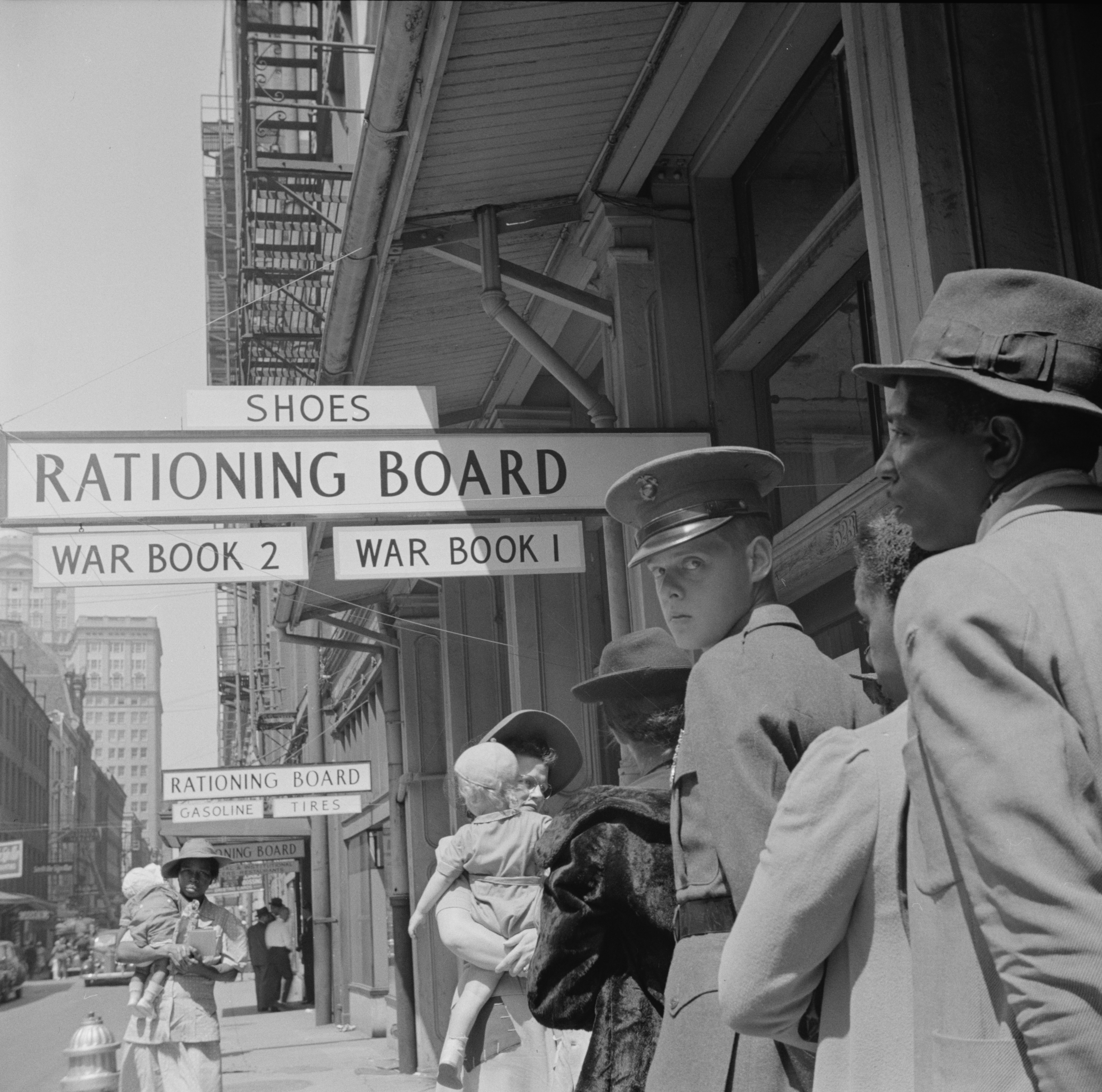
1943 waiting line at wartime Rationing Board office in New Orleans

New Orleans's economic and population zenith in relation to other American cities occurred in the antebellum period. It was the nation's fifth-largest city in 1860 (after New York, Philadelphia, Boston and Baltimore) and was significantly larger than all other southern cities. From the mid-19th century onward rapid economic growth shifted to other areas, while New Orleans's relative importance steadily declined. The growth of railways and highways decreased river traffic, diverting goods to other transportation corridors and markets. Thousands of the most ambitious people of color left the state in the Great Migration around World War II and after, many for West Coast destinations. From the late 1800s, most censuses recorded New Orleans slipping down the ranks in the list of largest American cities (New Orleans's population still continued to increase throughout the period, but at a slower rate than before the Civil War).

In 1929, a streetcar strike took place in the city, during which serious unrest occurred. It is also credited for the creation of the distinctly Louisianan po' boy sandwich.

By the mid-20th century, New Orleanians recognized that their city was no longer the leading urban area in the South. By 1950, Houston, Dallas, and Atlanta exceeded New Orleans in size, and in 1960 Miami eclipsed New Orleans, even as the latter's population reached its historic peak. As with other older American cities, highway construction and suburban development drew residents from the center city to newer housing outside. The 1970 census recorded the first absolute decline in population since the city became part of the United States in 1803. The New Orleans metropolitan area continued expanding in population, albeit more slowly than other major Sun Belt cities. While the Port of New Orleans remained one of the nation's largest, automation and containerization cost many jobs. The city's former role as banker to the South was supplanted by larger peer cities. New Orleans's economy had always been based more on trade and financial services than on manufacturing, but the city's relatively small manufacturing sector also shrank after World War II. Despite some economic development successes under the administrations of deLesseps Story Morrison (1946–1961) and Victor H. Schiro (1961–1970), metropolitan New Orleans's growth rate consistently lagged behind more vigorous cities.

During the later years of Mayor deLesseps Morrison's administration and throughout Victor Schiro's tenure, New Orleans became a focal point of the Civil Rights Movement. The Southern Christian Leadership Conference was founded in the city, and lunch counter sit-ins took place in Canal Street department stores. Tensions escalated in 1960 during school desegregation following the Brown v. Board of Education (1954) ruling. Six-year-old Ruby Bridges integrated William Frantz Elementary School, becoming the first child of color to attend a previously all-white Southern school. Racial controversy also surrounded the 1956 Sugar Bowl, when Georgia governor Marvin Griffin opposed the participation of Pitt Panthers African-American fullback Bobby Grier. Georgia Institute of Technology president Blake R. Van Leer defied the governor, and the game proceeded. The federal Civil Rights Act of 1964 and the Voting Rights Act of 1965 restored key constitutional protections, but economic and educational disparities between Black and White residents remained. As more affluent residents left the city, its population became increasingly poor and predominantly African-American. Beginning in 1980, Black-majority leadership emerged, working to address entrenched socioeconomic inequities.

By the late 20th century, New Orleans had grown increasingly reliant on tourism amid rising poverty, low educational attainment, and high crime, which hindered its adaptation to the broader U.S. shift toward a post-industrial service economy. Meanwhile, city leaders pursued geographic expansion through ambitious drainage efforts. Engineer A. Baldwin Wood designed a pump system that allowed development in formerly uninhabitable swamp and marsh areas, but over time, these areas subsided significantly below sea level. Although the city had always faced flooding risks, awareness of its vulnerability grew after Hurricane Betsy in 1965 and the May 8th 1995 Louisiana Flood. These events exposed the limits of the drainage system, prompting upgrades. By the 1980s and 1990s, scientists warned that erosion of the marshlands and swamp surrounding New Orleans, exacerbated by developments like the Mississippi River–Gulf Outlet Canal, had left the city more exposed than ever to hurricane storm surges.

=== 21st century ===
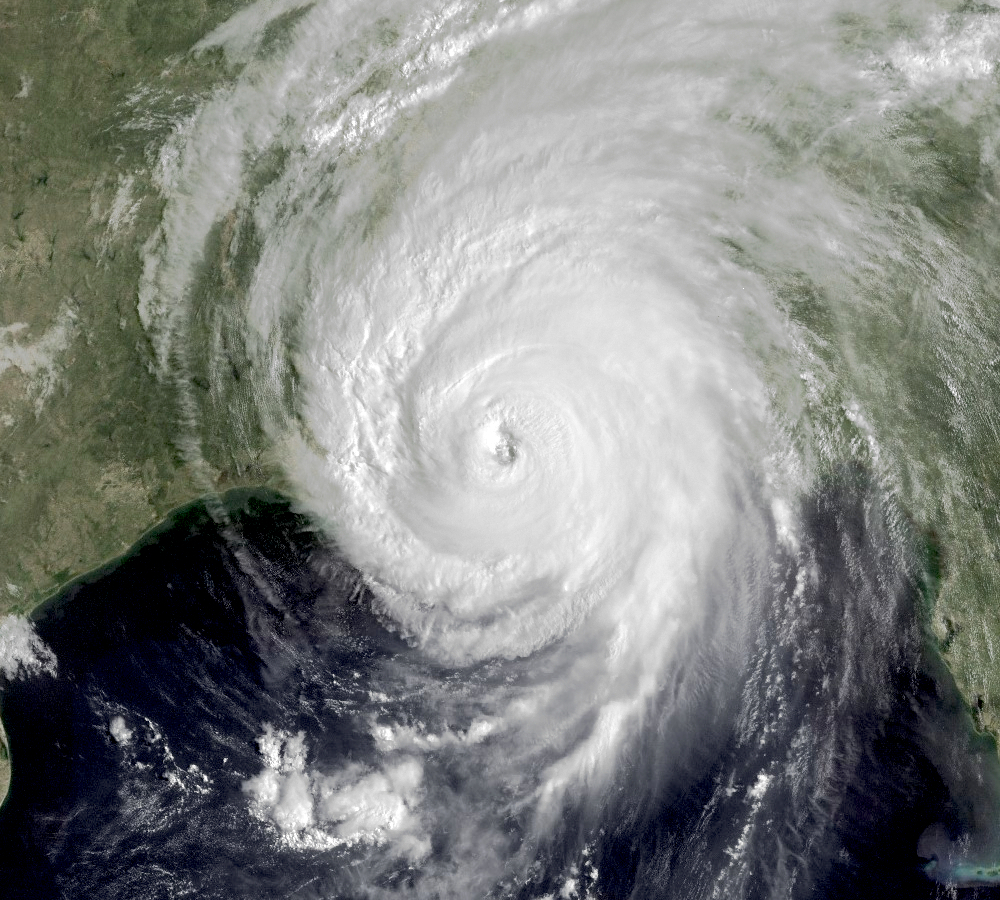
Hurricane Katrina at its landfall near the Louisiana-Mississippi border

New Orleans was catastrophically affected by what Raymond B. Seed called "the worst engineering disaster in the world since Chernobyl", when the federal levee system failed during Hurricane Katrina on August 29, 2005. By the time the hurricane approached the city on August 29, 2005, most residents had evacuated. As the hurricane passed through the Gulf Coast region that day, the city's federal flood protection system failed, resulting in the worst civil engineering disaster in American history at the time. Floodwalls and levees constructed by the United States Army Corps of Engineers failed below design specifications and 80% of the city flooded. Tens of thousands of residents who had remained were rescued or otherwise made their way to shelters of last resort at the Louisiana Superdome or the New Orleans Morial Convention Center. More than 1,500 people were recorded as having died in Louisiana, most in New Orleans, while others remain unaccounted for. Before Hurricane Katrina, the city called for the first mandatory evacuation in its history, to be followed by another mandatory evacuation three years later with Hurricane Gustav.

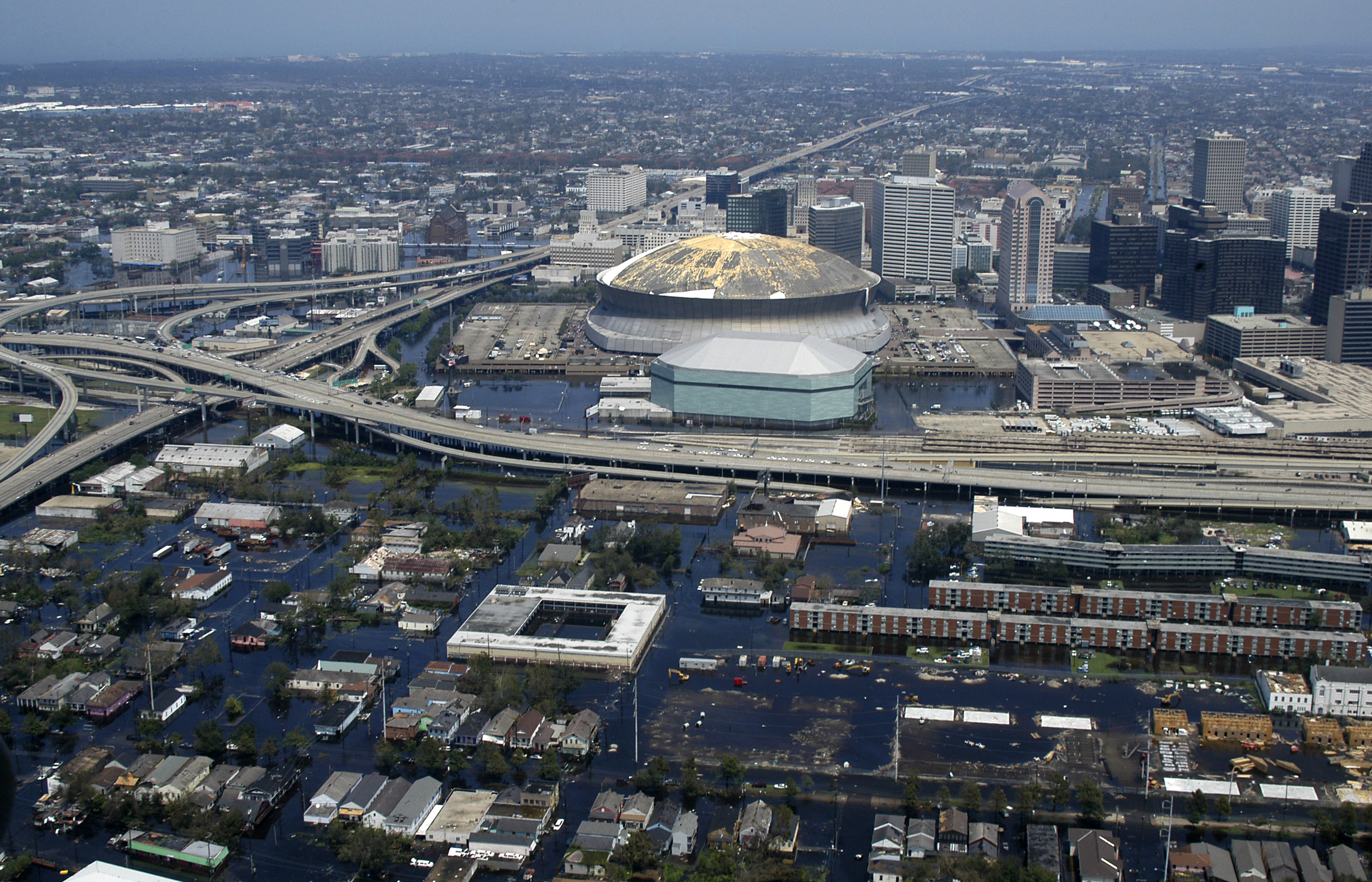
An aerial view from a United States Navy helicopter showing floodwaters around the Louisiana Superdome and surrounding area (2005)

The city was declared off-limits to residents while efforts to clean up after Hurricane Katrina began. The approach of Hurricane Rita in September 2005 caused repopulation efforts to be postponed, and the Lower Ninth Ward was reflooded by Rita's storm surge. Because of the scale of damage, many people resettled permanently outside the area. Federal, state, and local efforts supported recovery and rebuilding in severely damaged neighborhoods. The U.S. Census Bureau in July 2006 estimated the population to be 223,000; the city was estimated to have regained approximately 60% of its pre-Katrina population by summer 2007. Ten years after the hurricane, the population had recovered to 80% of what it was at the 2000 census.

Several major tourist events and other forms of revenue for the city have returned. Large conventions returned. College bowl games returned for the 2006–2007 season. The New Orleans Saints returned that season. The New Orleans Hornets (now named the Pelicans) returned to the city for the 2007–2008 season. New Orleans hosted the 2008 NBA All-Star Game in addition to Super Bowl XLVII. Major annual events such as Mardi Gras, Voodoo Experience, and the Jazz & Heritage Festival were never displaced or canceled. A new annual festival, "The Running of the Bulls New Orleans", was created in 2007.

On August 29, 2021, coincidentally the 16th anniversary of the landfall of Hurricane Katrina, Hurricane Ida, a category 4 hurricane, made landfall near Port Fourchon, where the Hurricane Ida tornado outbreak caused damage. On January 1, 2025, a truck attack occurred in New Orleans, killing 15 people and injuring 35. The attack was carried out as an act of domestic terrorism and was committed by Shamsud-Din Jabbar.

On December 30, 2025, 350 Louisiana National Guard troops were deployed to New Orleans as part of a wave of recent nationwide National Guard deployments.

== Geography ==
A true-color image captured by ESA's Sentinel-2A in April 2024, New Orleans positioned at the bottom right of the image. Lake Pontchartrain prominently occupies the central area of the image, while the Mississippi River can also be observed coursing through the city.

New Orleans is located in the Mississippi River Delta, south of Lake Pontchartrain, on the banks of the Mississippi River, approximately 105 miles (169 km) upriver from the Gulf of Mexico. According to the U.S. Census Bureau, the city's area is 350 square miles (910 km^{2}), of which 169 square miles (440 km^{2}) is land and 181 square miles (470 km^{2}) (52%) is water. The area along the river is characterized by ridges and hollows.

=== Elevation ===
Vertical cross-section, showing maximum levee height of 23 feet (7.0 m). Note that the depicted water level of the river equates to its average annual high-water mark, some fourteen feet above sea level; by contrast, the lake level exhibits little meaningful seasonal variation.

New Orleans was originally settled on the river's natural levees or high ground. After the Flood Control Act of 1965, the U.S. Army Corps of Engineers built floodwalls and man-made levees around a much larger geographic footprint that included previous marshland and swamp. Over time, pumping of water from marshland allowed for development into lower elevation areas. Today, half of the city is at or below local mean sea level, while the other half is slightly above sea level. Evidence suggests that portions of the city may be dropping in elevation due to subsidence.

A 2007 study by Tulane and Xavier University suggested that "51%... of the contiguous urbanized portions of Orleans, Jefferson, and St. Bernard parishes lie at or above sea level," with the more densely populated areas generally on higher ground. The average elevation of the city is currently between 1 and 2 feet (0.30 and 0.61 m) below sea level, with some portions of the city as high as 20 feet (6 m) at the base of the river levee in Uptown and others as low as 7 feet (2 m) below sea level in the farthest reaches of Eastern New Orleans. A study published by the ASCE Journal of Hydrologic Engineering in 2016, however, stated:

...most of New Orleans proper—about 65%—is at or below mean sea level, as defined by the average elevation of Lake Pontchartrain

The magnitude of subsidence potentially caused by the draining of natural marsh in the New Orleans area and southeast Louisiana is a topic of debate. A study published in Geology in 2006 by an associate professor at Tulane University claims:

While erosion and wetland loss are huge problems along Louisiana's coast, the basement 30 feet (9.1 m) to 50 feet (15 m) beneath much of the Mississippi Delta has been highly stable for the past 8,000 years with negligible subsidence rates.

The study noted, however, that the results did not necessarily apply to the Mississippi River Delta, nor the New Orleans metropolitan area proper. On the other hand, a report by the American Society of Civil Engineers claims that "New Orleans is subsiding (sinking)":

Large portions of Orleans, St. Bernard, and Jefferson parishes are currently below sea level—and continue to sink. New Orleans is built on thousands of feet of soft sand, silt, and clay. Subsidence, or settling of the ground surface, occurs naturally due to the consolidation and oxidation of organic soils (called "marsh" in New Orleans) and local groundwater pumping. In the past, flooding and deposition of sediments from the Mississippi River counterbalanced the natural subsidence, leaving southeast Louisiana at or above sea level. However, due to major flood control structures being built upstream on the Mississippi River and levees being built around New Orleans, fresh layers of sediment are not replenishing the ground lost by subsidence.

In May 2016, NASA published a study which suggested that most areas were, in fact, experiencing subsidence at a "highly variable rate" which was "generally consistent with, but somewhat higher than, previous studies."

=== Environment ===
Several studies note high rates of cancer, premature birth and low birth weight in the 85-mile corridor between New Orleans and Baton Rouge. Known as "Cancer Alley", the area has a predominately African-American population. The primary cause is thought to be air pollution created by the petrochemical industry.

=== Cityscape ===
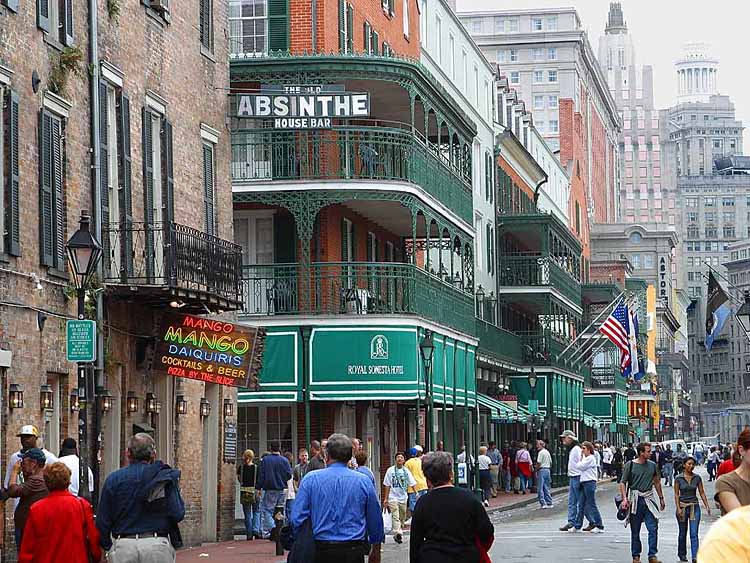
Bourbon Street, New Orleans, in 2003, looking towards Canal Street

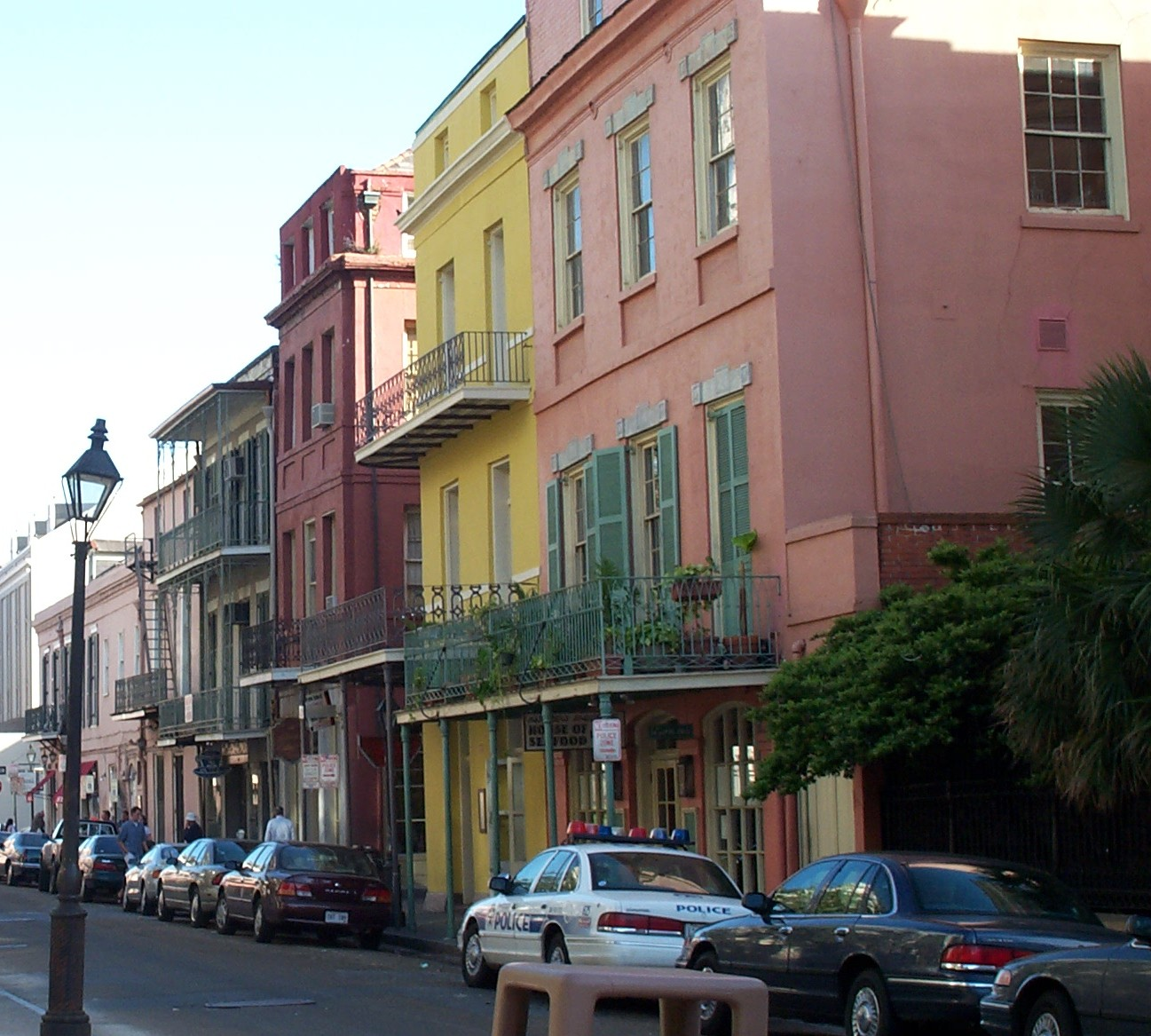
New Orleans contains many distinctive neighborhoods.

The Central Business District is located immediately north and west of the Mississippi and was historically called the "American Quarter" or "American Sector". It was developed after the heart of French and Spanish settlement. It includes Lafayette Square. Most streets in this area fan out from a central point. Major streets include Canal Street, Poydras Street, Tulane Avenue and Loyola Avenue. Canal Street divides the traditional "downtown" area from the "uptown" area.

Every street crossing Canal Street between the Mississippi River and Rampart Street, which is the northern edge of the French Quarter, has a different name for the "uptown" and "downtown" portions. For example, St. Charles Avenue, known for its street car line, is called Royal Street below Canal Street, though where it traverses the Central Business District between Canal and Lee Circle, it is properly called St. Charles Street. Elsewhere in the city, Canal Street serves as the dividing point between the "South" and "North" portions of various streets. In the local parlance downtown means "downriver from Canal Street", while uptown means "upriver from Canal Street". Downtown neighborhoods include the French Quarter, Tremé, the 7th Ward, Faubourg Marigny, Bywater (the Upper Ninth Ward), and the Lower Ninth Ward. Uptown neighborhoods include the Warehouse District, the Lower Garden District, the Garden District, the Irish Channel, the University District, Carrollton, Gert Town, Fontainebleau, and Broadmoor. However, the Warehouse and the Central Business District are frequently called "Downtown" as a specific region, as in the Downtown Development District.

Other major districts within the city include Bayou St. John, Mid-City, Gentilly, Lakeview, Lakefront, New Orleans East, and Algiers.

==== Historic and residential architecture ====
New Orleans is world-famous for its abundance of architectural styles that reflect the city's multicultural heritage. Though New Orleans possesses numerous structures of national architectural significance, it is equally, if not more, revered for its enormous, largely intact (even post-Katrina) historic built environment. Twenty National Register Historic Districts have been established, and fourteen local historic districts aid in preservation. Thirteen of the districts are administered by the New Orleans Historic District Landmarks Commission (HDLC), while one—the French Quarter—is administered by the Vieux Carre Commission (VCC). Additionally, both the National Park Service, via the National Register of Historic Places, and the HDLC have landmarked individual buildings, many of which lie outside the boundaries of existing historic districts.

Housing styles include the shotgun house and the bungalow style. Creole cottages and townhouses, notable for their large courtyards and intricate iron balconies, line the streets of the French Quarter. American townhouses, double-gallery houses, and Raised Center-Hall Cottages are notable. St. Charles Avenue is famed for its large antebellum homes. Its mansions are in various styles, such as Greek Revival, American Colonial and the Victorian styles of Queen Anne and Italianate architecture. New Orleans is also noted for its large, European-style Catholic cemeteries.

==== Tallest buildings ====
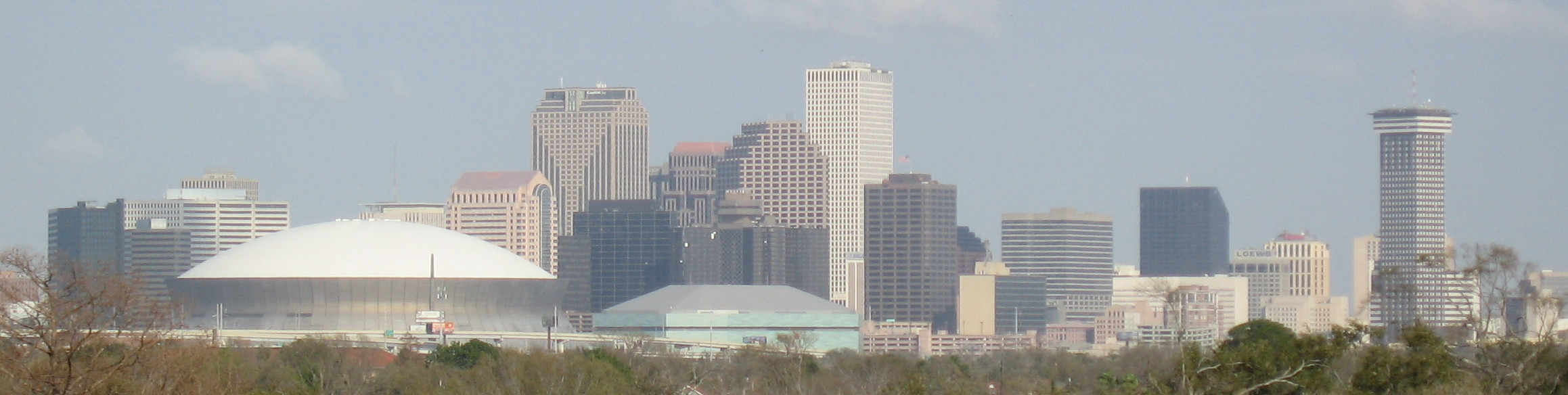
Skyline of the Central Business District of New Orleans

For much of its history, New Orleans's skyline displayed only low- and mid-rise structures. The soft soils are susceptible to subsidence, and there was doubt about the feasibility of constructing high rises. Developments in engineering throughout the 20th century eventually made it possible to build sturdy foundations in the foundations that underlie the structures. In the 1960s, the World Trade Center New Orleans and Plaza Tower demonstrated skyscrapers' viability. One Shell Square became the city's tallest building in 1972. The oil boom of the 1970s and early 1980s redefined New Orleans's skyline with the development of the Poydras Street corridor. Most are clustered along Canal Street and Poydras Street in the Central Business District.

| Name | Stories | Height |
|---|---|---|
| One Shell Square | 51 | 697 ft (212 m) |
| Place St. Charles | 53 | 645 ft (197 m) |
| Plaza Tower | 45 | 531 ft (162 m) |
| Energy Centre | 39 | 530 ft (160 m) |
| First Bank and Trust Tower | 36 | 481 ft (147 m) |

=== Climate ===
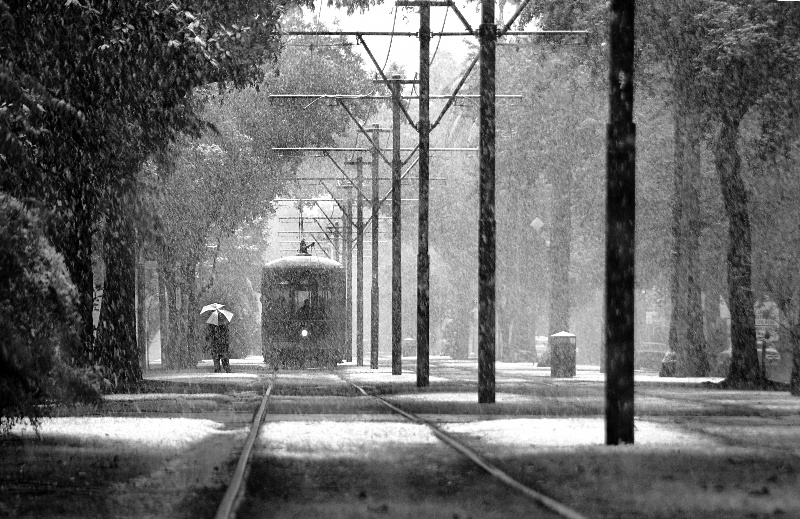
Snow falls on St. Charles Avenue in December 2008.

The climate of New Orleans is humid subtropical (Köppen: Cfa), with short, generally mild winters and hot, humid summers; in the 1991–2020 climate normals the USDA hardiness zone is 9b, with the coldest temperature in most years being about 27.6 °F (−2.4 °C). The monthly daily average temperature ranges from 54.3 °F (12.4 °C) in January to 84 °F (28.9 °C) in August. Officially, as measured at New Orleans International Airport, temperature records range from 11 to 105 °F (−12 to 41 °C) on December 23, 1989, and August 27, 2023, respectively; Audubon Park has recorded temperatures ranging from 6 °F (−14 °C) on February 13, 1899, up to 104 °F (40 °C) on June 24, 2009, and August 28, 2023. Dewpoints in the summer months (June–August) are relatively high, ranging from 71.1 to 73.4 °F (21.7 to 23.0 °C).

The average precipitation is 62.5 inches (1,590 mm) annually; the summer months are the wettest, while October is the driest month. Precipitation in winter usually accompanies the passing of a cold front. There are a median of over 80 days of 90 °F (32 °C)+ highs, 9 days per winter where the high does not exceed 50 °F (10 °C), and less than 8 nights with freezing lows annually, although it is not uncommon for entire winter seasons to pass with no freezing temperatures at all, such as the 2003–04 winter, the 2012–13 winter, the 2015–16 winter and the consecutive winters of 2018–19 and 2019–20. It is rare for the temperature to reach 20 or 100 °F (−7 or 38 °C), with the last occurrence of each being January 17, 2018, and August 27, 2023, respectively.

New Orleans experiences snowfall only on rare occasions. The New Year's Eve 1963 snowstorm affected New Orleans and brought 4.5 inches (11 cm). Snow fell again on December 22, 1989, during the December 1989 United States cold wave, when most of the city received 1–2 inches (2.5–5.1 cm). A small amount of snow fell during the 2004 Christmas Eve Snowstorm and again on Christmas (December 25) when a combination of rain, sleet, and snow fell on the city, leaving some bridges icy. The last significant snowfall in New Orleans was on January 21, 2025, when the city received 8–10 inches (20–25 cm) of snow.

Climate data for Audubon Park, New Orleans (1991–2020 normals, extremes 1871–present)
| Month | Jan | Feb | Mar | Apr | May | Jun | Jul | Aug | Sep | Oct | Nov | Dec | Year |
|---|---|---|---|---|---|---|---|---|---|---|---|---|---|
| Record high °F (°C) | 84 (29) | 86 (30) | 91 (33) | 93 (34) | 99 (37) | 104 (40) | 102 (39) | 104 (40) | 101 (38) | 97 (36) | 92 (33) | 85 (29) | 104 (40) |
| Mean maximum °F (°C) | 77.5 (25.3) | 80.3 (26.8) | 84.3 (29.1) | 87.8 (31.0) | 93.7 (34.3) | 97.3 (36.3) | 98.3 (36.8) | 98.1 (36.7) | 95.6 (35.3) | 90.4 (32.4) | 84.3 (29.1) | 79.5 (26.4) | 99.2 (37.3) |
| Mean daily maximum °F (°C) | 64.3 (17.9) | 68.4 (20.2) | 74.5 (23.6) | 80.9 (27.2) | 87.9 (31.1) | 92.5 (33.6) | 93.9 (34.4) | 94.0 (34.4) | 90.1 (32.3) | 82.6 (28.1) | 72.9 (22.7) | 66.4 (19.1) | 80.7 (27.1) |
| Daily mean °F (°C) | 55.4 (13.0) | 59.4 (15.2) | 65.2 (18.4) | 71.4 (21.9) | 78.6 (25.9) | 83.7 (28.7) | 85.2 (29.6) | 85.5 (29.7) | 81.8 (27.7) | 73.6 (23.1) | 63.7 (17.6) | 57.7 (14.3) | 71.8 (22.1) |
| Mean daily minimum °F (°C) | 46.5 (8.1) | 50.5 (10.3) | 55.8 (13.2) | 62.0 (16.7) | 69.3 (20.7) | 74.9 (23.8) | 76.6 (24.8) | 76.9 (24.9) | 73.6 (23.1) | 64.7 (18.2) | 54.6 (12.6) | 49.0 (9.4) | 62.9 (17.2) |
| Mean minimum °F (°C) | 30.9 (−0.6) | 35.3 (1.8) | 39.4 (4.1) | 47.8 (8.8) | 58.2 (14.6) | 68.4 (20.2) | 71.9 (22.2) | 71.7 (22.1) | 64.0 (17.8) | 50.5 (10.3) | 40.0 (4.4) | 34.8 (1.6) | 28.9 (−1.7) |
| Record low °F (°C) | 13 (−11) | 6 (−14) | 26 (−3) | 32 (0) | 46 (8) | 54 (12) | 61 (16) | 60 (16) | 49 (9) | 35 (2) | 26 (−3) | 12 (−11) | 6 (−14) |
| Average precipitation inches (mm) | 4.95 (126) | 4.14 (105) | 4.60 (117) | 4.99 (127) | 5.39 (137) | 7.37 (187) | 8.77 (223) | 6.80 (173) | 5.72 (145) | 3.58 (91) | 3.78 (96) | 4.51 (115) | 64.60 (1,641) |
| Average precipitation days (≥ 0.01 in) | 9.8 | 8.9 | 7.5 | 7.0 | 7.4 | 12.6 | 15.1 | 13.3 | 10.0 | 6.8 | 7.3 | 8.8 | 114.5 |
Source: NOAAWRCC (for Period of Record data from 1871 to 1892)

Climate data for Louis Armstrong New Orleans International Airport (1991–2020 normals, (Note: Mean monthly maxima and minima (i.e. the expected highest and lowest temperature readings at any point during the year or given month) calculated based on data at said location from 1991 to 2020) extremes 1946–present) (Note: Official records for New Orleans have been kept at MSY since May 1, 1946. Additional records from WSO City and Audubon Park dating back to 1871-1892 and 1893 respectively have also been included.)
| Month | Jan | Feb | Mar | Apr | May | Jun | Jul | Aug | Sep | Oct | Nov | Dec | Year |
|---|---|---|---|---|---|---|---|---|---|---|---|---|---|
| Record high °F (°C) | 83 (28) | 86 (30) | 89 (32) | 92 (33) | 97 (36) | 101 (38) | 101 (38) | 105 (41) | 101 (38) | 97 (36) | 88 (31) | 85 (29) | 105 (41) |
| Mean maximum °F (°C) | 77.5 (25.3) | 79.7 (26.5) | 82.9 (28.3) | 86.5 (30.3) | 91.9 (33.3) | 95.2 (35.1) | 96.6 (35.9) | 96.7 (35.9) | 94.3 (34.6) | 89.8 (32.1) | 83.8 (28.8) | 80.3 (26.8) | 97.6 (36.4) |
| Mean daily maximum °F (°C) | 62.5 (16.9) | 66.4 (19.1) | 72.3 (22.4) | 78.5 (25.8) | 85.3 (29.6) | 90.0 (32.2) | 91.4 (33.0) | 91.3 (32.9) | 88.1 (31.2) | 80.6 (27.0) | 71.2 (21.8) | 64.8 (18.2) | 78.5 (25.8) |
| Daily mean °F (°C) | 54.3 (12.4) | 58.0 (14.4) | 63.8 (17.7) | 70.1 (21.2) | 77.1 (25.1) | 82.4 (28.0) | 83.9 (28.8) | 84.0 (28.9) | 80.8 (27.1) | 72.5 (22.5) | 62.4 (16.9) | 56.6 (13.7) | 70.5 (21.4) |
| Mean daily minimum °F (°C) | 46.1 (7.8) | 49.7 (9.8) | 55.3 (12.9) | 61.7 (16.5) | 69.0 (20.6) | 74.7 (23.7) | 76.5 (24.7) | 76.6 (24.8) | 73.5 (23.1) | 64.3 (17.9) | 53.7 (12.1) | 48.4 (9.1) | 62.5 (16.9) |
| Mean minimum °F (°C) | 29.5 (−1.4) | 33.4 (0.8) | 38.0 (3.3) | 47.1 (8.4) | 57.3 (14.1) | 67.4 (19.7) | 71.4 (21.9) | 71.1 (21.7) | 63.3 (17.4) | 47.7 (8.7) | 37.7 (3.2) | 32.6 (0.3) | 27.6 (−2.4) |
| Record low °F (°C) | 14 (−10) | 16 (−9) | 25 (−4) | 32 (0) | 41 (5) | 50 (10) | 60 (16) | 60 (16) | 42 (6) | 35 (2) | 24 (−4) | 11 (−12) | 11 (−12) |
| Average precipitation inches (mm) | 5.18 (132) | 4.13 (105) | 4.36 (111) | 5.22 (133) | 5.64 (143) | 7.62 (194) | 6.79 (172) | 6.91 (176) | 5.11 (130) | 3.70 (94) | 3.87 (98) | 4.82 (122) | 63.35 (1,609) |
| Average precipitation days (≥ 0.01 in) | 9.5 | 9.0 | 8.1 | 7.3 | 7.8 | 12.7 | 13.9 | 13.6 | 9.8 | 7.1 | 7.1 | 9.2 | 115.1 |
| Average relative humidity (%) | 75.6 | 73.0 | 72.9 | 73.4 | 74.4 | 76.4 | 79.2 | 79.4 | 77.8 | 74.9 | 77.2 | 76.9 | 75.9 |
| Mean monthly sunshine hours | 153.0 | 161.5 | 219.4 | 251.9 | 278.9 | 274.3 | 257.1 | 251.9 | 228.7 | 242.6 | 171.8 | 157.8 | 2,648.9 |
| Percentage possible sunshine | 47 | 52 | 59 | 65 | 66 | 65 | 60 | 62 | 62 | 68 | 54 | 50 | 60 |
Source: NOAA (relative humidity and sun 1961–1990) (Note: Sunshine normals are based on only 20 to 22 years of data.)

Climate data for Lakefront Airport (1991–2020 normals, (Note: Mean monthly maxima and minima (i.e. the expected highest and lowest temperature readings at any point during the year or given month) calculated based on data at said location from 1991 to 2020) extremes 1937–1954, 1991–present)
| Month | Jan | Feb | Mar | Apr | May | Jun | Jul | Aug | Sep | Oct | Nov | Dec | Year |
|---|---|---|---|---|---|---|---|---|---|---|---|---|---|
| Record high °F (°C) | 86 (30) | 85 (29) | 89 (32) | 91 (33) | 96 (36) | 101 (38) | 105 (41) | 105 (41) | 101 (38) | 93 (34) | 87 (31) | 86 (30) | 105 (41) |
| Mean maximum °F (°C) | 77.5 (25.3) | 79.9 (26.6) | 83.0 (28.3) | 86.2 (30.1) | 91.8 (33.2) | 95.3 (35.2) | 96.9 (36.1) | 96.4 (35.8) | 93.7 (34.3) | 88.6 (31.4) | 83.7 (28.7) | 79.8 (26.6) | 97.5 (36.4) |
| Mean daily maximum °F (°C) | 61.0 (16.1) | 65.3 (18.5) | 71.4 (21.9) | 77.4 (25.2) | 84.6 (29.2) | 89.3 (31.8) | 90.6 (32.6) | 90.8 (32.7) | 87.2 (30.7) | 79.2 (26.2) | 69.8 (21.0) | 63.4 (17.4) | 77.5 (25.3) |
| Daily mean °F (°C) | 54.0 (12.2) | 58.1 (14.5) | 64.1 (17.8) | 70.6 (21.4) | 77.7 (25.4) | 82.9 (28.3) | 84.4 (29.1) | 84.7 (29.3) | 81.4 (27.4) | 72.9 (22.7) | 63.1 (17.3) | 56.4 (13.6) | 70.9 (21.6) |
| Mean daily minimum °F (°C) | 46.9 (8.3) | 50.8 (10.4) | 56.8 (13.8) | 63.4 (17.4) | 70.9 (21.6) | 76.4 (24.7) | 78.2 (25.7) | 78.6 (25.9) | 73.5 (23.1) | 66.6 (19.2) | 56.3 (13.5) | 49.5 (9.7) | 64.2 (17.9) |
| Mean minimum °F (°C) | 31.8 (−0.1) | 38.0 (3.3) | 42.9 (6.1) | 51.9 (11.1) | 62.0 (16.7) | 71.3 (21.8) | 74.2 (23.4) | 73.6 (23.1) | 67.7 (19.8) | 53.6 (12.0) | 42.9 (6.1) | 37.2 (2.9) | 30.1 (−1.1) |
| Record low °F (°C) | 19 (−7) | 17 (−8) | 28 (−2) | 41 (5) | 51 (11) | 60 (16) | 68 (20) | 68 (20) | 53 (12) | 40 (4) | 29 (−2) | 25 (−4) | 17 (−8) |
| Average precipitation inches (mm) | 5.26 (134) | 4.08 (104) | 4.63 (118) | 5.87 (149) | 4.94 (125) | 6.04 (153) | 6.29 (160) | 6.46 (164) | 4.64 (118) | 3.64 (92) | 3.64 (92) | 4.63 (118) | 60.12 (1,527) |
| Average precipitation days (≥ 0.01 in) | 9.5 | 9.0 | 8.1 | 7.3 | 7.8 | 12.7 | 13.9 | 13.6 | 9.8 | 7.1 | 7.1 | 9.2 | 115.1 |
| Average relative humidity (%) | 75.6 | 73.0 | 72.9 | 73.4 | 74.4 | 76.4 | 79.2 | 79.4 | 77.8 | 74.9 | 77.2 | 76.9 | 75.9 |
| Mean monthly sunshine hours | 153.0 | 161.5 | 219.4 | 251.9 | 278.9 | 274.3 | 257.1 | 251.9 | 228.7 | 242.6 | 171.8 | 157.8 | 2,648.9 |
| Percentage possible sunshine | 47 | 52 | 59 | 65 | 66 | 65 | 60 | 62 | 62 | 68 | 54 | 50 | 60 |
Source: NOAA (relative humidity and sun 1961–1990) (Note: Sunshine normals are based on only 20 to 22 years of data.)

=== Threat from tropical cyclones ===
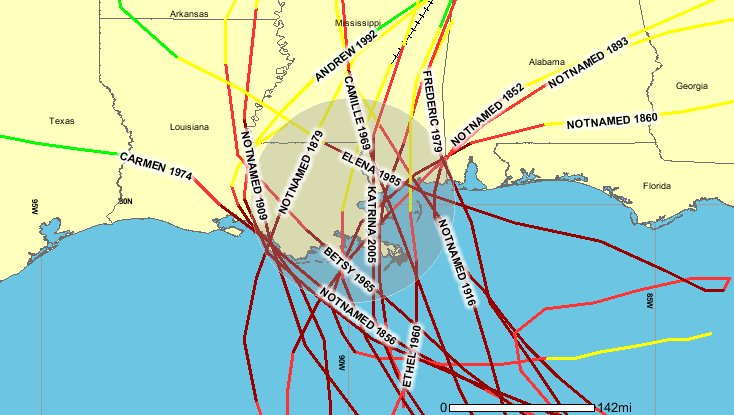
Hurricanes of Category 3 or greater passing within 100 miles, from 1852 to 2005 (NOAA)

Hurricanes pose a severe threat to the area, and the city is particularly at risk due to its low elevation, the city being surrounded by water from the north, east, and south, and Louisiana's sinking coast. According to the Federal Emergency Management Agency, New Orleans is the nation's most vulnerable city to hurricanes. Indeed, portions of Greater New Orleans have been flooded by the Grand Isle Hurricane of 1909, the New Orleans Hurricane of 1915, 1947 Fort Lauderdale Hurricane, Hurricane Flossy in 1956, Hurricane Betsy in 1965, Hurricane Georges in 1998, Hurricanes Katrina and Rita in 2005, Hurricane Gustav in 2008, Hurricane Isaac in 2012, Hurricane Zeta in 2020 (Zeta was also the most intense hurricane to pass over New Orleans) and Hurricane Ida in 2021. The flooding from Betsy was significant and in a few neighborhoods severe, and that from Katrina was disastrous for the majority of the city.

On August 29, 2005, storm surge from Hurricane Katrina caused catastrophic failure of the federally designed and built levees, flooding 80% of the city. A report by the American Society of Civil Engineers says that "had the levees and floodwalls not failed and had the pump stations operated, nearly two-thirds of the deaths would not have occurred".

New Orleans has always had to consider the risk of hurricanes, but the risks are dramatically greater today due to coastal erosion from human interference. Since the beginning of the 20th century, it has been estimated that Louisiana has lost 2,000 square miles (5,000 km^{2}) of coast (including many of its barrier islands), which once protected New Orleans against storm surge. Following Hurricane Katrina, the Army Corps of Engineers has instituted massive levee repair and hurricane protection measures to protect the city.

In 2006, Louisiana voters overwhelmingly adopted an amendment to the state's constitution to dedicate all revenues from off-shore drilling to restore Louisiana's eroding coast line. U.S. Congress has allocated $7 billion to bolster New Orleans's flood protection.

According to a study by the National Academy of Engineering and the National Research Council, levees and floodwalls surrounding New Orleans—no matter how large or sturdy—cannot provide absolute protection against overtopping or failure in extreme events. Rather, the city's levees and floodwalls should be viewed as a way to reduce risks from hurricanes and storm surges instead of eliminating those risks. For structures in hazardous areas and residents who do not relocate, the committee recommended major floodproofing measures (such as elevating the first floor of buildings to at least the 100-year flood level). Due to rising sea levels, most of New Orleans is at risk of being permanently underwater by the 2050s.

== Demographics ==
Historical population
| Year | Pop. | ±% |
|---|---|---|
| 1769 | 3,190 | — |
| 1778 | 3,060 | −4.1% |
| 1791 | 5,497 | +79.6% |
| 1810 | 17,242 | +213.7% |
| 1820 | 27,176 | +57.6% |
| 1830 | 46,082 | +69.6% |
| 1840 | 102,193 | +121.8% |
| 1850 | 116,375 | +13.9% |
| 1860 | 168,675 | +44.9% |
| 1870 | 191,418 | +13.5% |
| 1880 | 216,090 | +12.9% |
| 1890 | 242,039 | +12.0% |
| 1900 | 287,104 | +18.6% |
| 1910 | 339,075 | +18.1% |
| 1920 | 387,219 | +14.2% |
| 1930 | 458,762 | +18.5% |
| 1940 | 494,537 | +7.8% |
| 1950 | 570,445 | +15.3% |
| 1960 | 627,525 | +10.0% |
| 1970 | 593,471 | −5.4% |
| 1980 | 557,515 | −6.1% |
| 1990 | 496,938 | −10.9% |
| 2000 | 484,674 | −2.5% |
| 2010 | 343,829 | −29.1% |
| 2020 | 383,997 | +11.7% |
| 2025 (est.) | 362,154 | −5.7% |
Population given for the City of New Orleans, not for Orleans Parish, before New Orleans absorbed suburbs and rural areas of Orleans Parish in 1874, since which time the city and parish have been coterminous. Population for Orleans Parish was 41,351 in 1820; 49,826 in 1830; 102,193 in 1840; 119,460 in 1850; 174,491 in 1860; and 191,418 in 1870. Source: U.S. Decennial Census; Historical Population Figures; 1790–1960 1900–1990; 1990–2000 2010–2013; 2020 estimate

From the 2010 U.S. census to 2014 census estimates the city grew by 12%, adding an average of more than 10,000 new residents each year following the official decennial census. According to the 2020 United States census, there were 383,997 people, 151,753 households, and 69,370 families residing in the city. Prior to 1960, the population of New Orleans steadily increased to a historic 627,525.

Beginning in 1960, the population decreased due to factors such as the cycles of oil production and tourism, and as suburbanization, diversity, and white flight increased (as with many U.S. cities), and jobs migrated to surrounding parishes. This economic and population decline resulted in high levels of poverty in the city; in 1960 it had the fifth-highest poverty rate of all U.S. cities, and was almost twice the national average in 2005, at 24.5%. New Orleans experienced an increase in residential segregation from 1900 to 1980, leaving the disproportionately Black and African American poor in older, low-lying locations. These areas were especially susceptible to flood and storm damage.

The last population estimate before Hurricane Katrina was 454,865, as of July 1, 2005. A population analysis released in August 2007 estimated the population to be 273,000, 60% of the pre-Katrina population and an increase of about 50,000 since July 2006. A September 2007 report by The Greater New Orleans Community Data Center, which tracks population based on U.S. Postal Service figures, found that in August 2007, just over 137,000 households received mail. That compares with about 198,000 households in July 2005, representing about 70% of pre-Katrina population. In 2010, the U.S. Census Bureau revised upward its 2008 population estimate for the city, to 336,644 inhabitants. Estimates from 2010 showed that neighborhoods that did not flood were near or even greater than 100% of their pre-Katrina populations.

Katrina displaced 800,000 people, contributing significantly to the decline. Black and African Americans, renters, the elderly, and people with low income were disproportionately affected by Katrina, compared to affluent and White residents. Those same groups also had the slowest growth rate in the city after Katrina primarily due to the rising cost of living, low performing public schools, and high crime in lower income neighborhoods. In Katrina's aftermath, city government commissioned groups such as Bring New Orleans Back Commission, the New Orleans Neighborhood Rebuilding Plan, the Unified New Orleans Plan, and the Office of Recovery Management to contribute to plans addressing depopulation. Their ideas included shrinking the city's footprint from before the storm, incorporating community voices into development plans, and creating green spaces, some of which incited controversy.

A 2006 study by researchers at Tulane University and the University of California, Berkeley, determined that as many as 10,000 to 14,000 undocumented immigrants, many from Mexico, resided in New Orleans. In 2016, the Pew Research Center estimated at least 35,000 undocumented immigrants lived in New Orleans and its metropolitan area. The New Orleans Police Department began a new policy to "no longer cooperate with federal immigration enforcement" beginning on February 28, 2016.

As of 2010, 90.3% of residents age five and older spoke English at home as a primary language, while 4.8% spoke Spanish, 1.9% Vietnamese, and 1.1% spoke French. In total, 9.7% population age five and older spoke a mother language other than English.

=== Race and ethnicity ===
| Historic racial and ethnic composition | 2020 | 2010 | 1990 | 1970 | 1940 |
|---|---|---|---|---|---|
| White | n/a | 33.0% | 34.9% | 54.5% | 69.7% |
| —Non-Hispanic | 31.61% | 30.5% | 33.1% | 50.6% (Note: From 15% sample) | n/a |
| Black or African American | 53.61% | 60.2% | 61.9% | 45.0% | 30.1% |
| Hispanic or Latino (of any race) | 8.08% | 5.2% | 3.5% | 4.4% | n/a |
| Asian | 2.75% | 2.9% | 1.9% | 0.2% | 0.1% |
| Pacific Islander | 0.03% | n/a | n/a | n/a | n/a |
| Two or more races | 3.71% | 1.7% | n/a | n/a | n/a |

Orleans Parish, Louisiana – Racial and ethnic composition Note: the US Census treats Hispanic/Latino as an ethnic category. This table excludes Latinos from the racial categories and assigns them to a separate category. Hispanics/Latinos may be of any race.
| Race / Ethnicity (NH = Non-Hispanic) | Pop 1980 | Pop 1990 | Pop 2000 | Pop 2010 | Pop 2020 | % 1980 | % 1990 | % 2000 | % 2010 | % 2020 |
|---|---|---|---|---|---|---|---|---|---|---|
| White alone (NH) | 224,694 | 164,526 | 128,971 | 104,770 | 121,385 | 40.30% | 33.11% | 26.59% | 30.47% | 31.61% |
| Black or African American alone (NH) | 304,673 | 305,047 | 323,392 | 204,866 | 205,876 | 54.65% | 61.39% | 66.72% | 59.58% | 53.61% |
| Native American or Alaska Native alone (NH) | 524 | 660 | 852 | 827 | 761 | 0.09% | 0.13% | 0.18% | 0.24% | 0.20% |
| Asian alone (NH) | 7,332 | 8,955 | 10,919 | 9,883 | 10,573 | 1.32% | 1.80% | 2.25% | 2.87% | 2.75% |
| Native Hawaiian or Pacific Islander alone (NH) | x | x | 88 | 105 | 125 | x | x | 0.02% | 0.03% | 0.03% |
| Other race alone (NH) | 1,066 | 512 | 961 | 967 | 2,075 | 0.19% | 0.10% | 0.20% | 0.28% | 0.54% |
| Mixed race or Multiracial (NH) | x | x | 4,765 | 4,360 | 12,185 | x | x | 0.98% | 1.27% | 3.17% |
| Hispanic or Latino (any race) | 19,226 | 17,238 | 14,826 | 18,051 | 31,017 | 3.45% | 3.47% | 3.06% | 5.25% | 8.08% |
| Total | 557,515 | 496,938 | 484,674 | 343,829 | 373,977 | 100.00% | 100.00% | 100.00% | 100.00% | 100.00% |

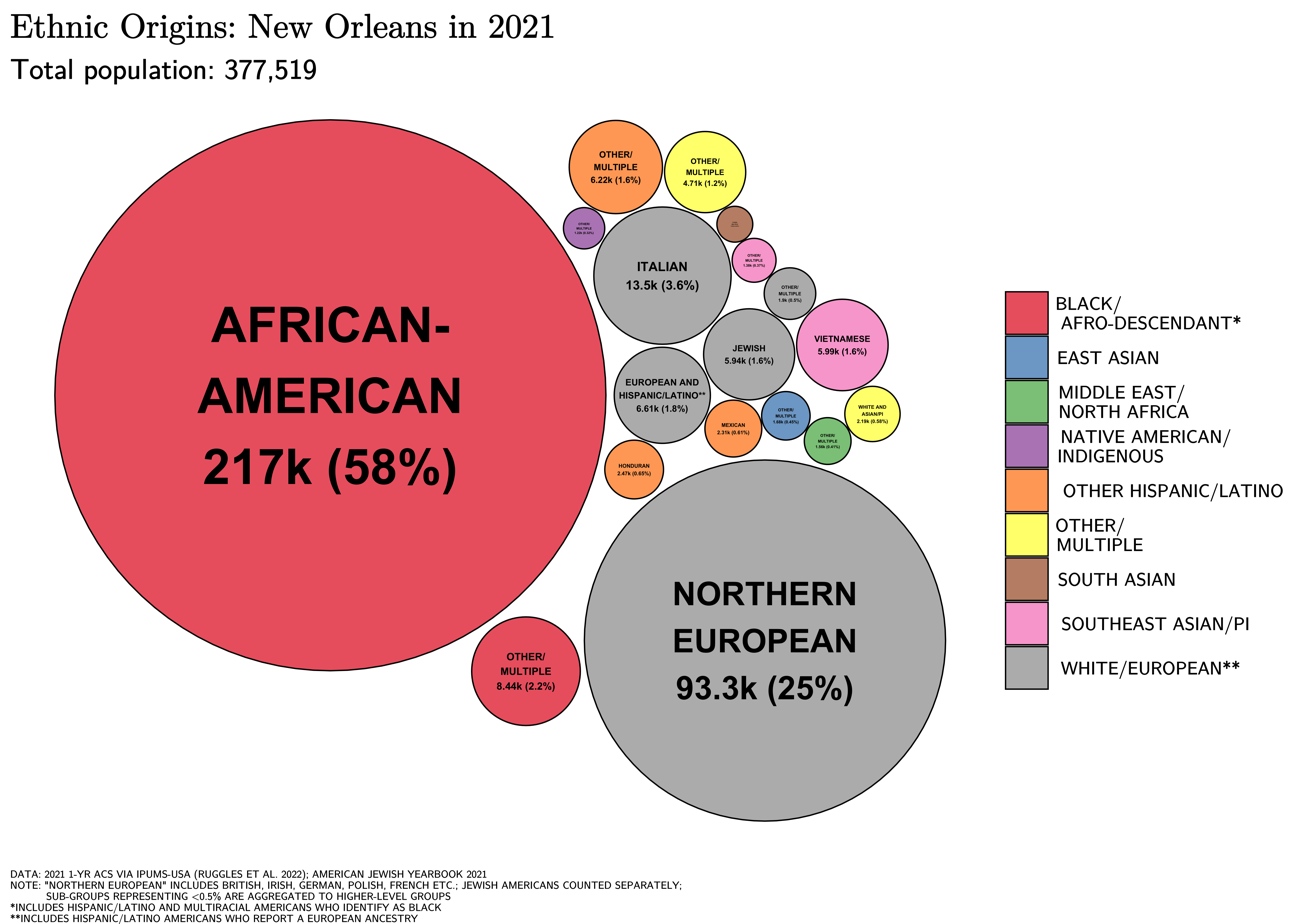
Ethnic origins in New Orleans (2020)

Growing into a predominantly Black and African-American city by race and ethnicity since 1990, in 2010 the racial and ethnic makeup of New Orleans was 60.2% Black and African American, 33.0% White, 2.9% Asian (1.7% Vietnamese, 0.3% Indian, 0.3% Chinese, 0.1% Filipino, 0.1% Korean), 0.0% Pacific Islander, and 1.7% people of two or more races. People of Hispanic or Latino American origin made up 5.3% of the population; 1.3% were Mexican, 1.3% Honduran, 0.4% Cuban, 0.3% Puerto Rican, and 0.3% Nicaraguan.

In 2020, the racial and ethnic makeup of the city was 53.61% Black or African American, 31.61% non-Hispanic white, 0.2% American Indian and Alaska Native, 0.03% Pacific Islander, 3.71% multiracial or of another race, and 8.08% Hispanic and Latino American of any race. The growth of the Hispanic and Latino population in New Orleans proper from 2010 to 2020 reflected national demographic trends of diversification throughout regions once predominantly non-Hispanic white. Additionally, the 2020 census revealed the city now has a more diverse population than it did before Katrina, yet 21% fewer people than it had in 2000. Out of Louisiana's 64 parishes, it is one of six that have an African-American majority as of the 2020 census.

As of 2011, the Hispanic and Latino American population had also grown in the Greater New Orleans area alongside Black and African American residents, including in Kenner, central Metairie, and Terrytown in Jefferson Parish and Eastern New Orleans and Mid-City in New Orleans proper. Janet Murguía, president and chief executive officer of the UnidosUS, stated that up to 120,000 Hispanic and Latino Americans workers lived in New Orleans. In June 2007, one study stated that the Hispanic and Latino American population had risen from 15,000, pre-Katrina, to over 50,000.

After Katrina the small Brazilian American population expanded. Portuguese speakers were the second most numerous group to take English as a second language classes in the Roman Catholic Archdiocese of New Orleans, after Spanish speakers. Many Brazilians worked in skilled trades such as tile and flooring, although fewer worked as day laborers than other Hispanic and Latino Americans. Many had moved from Brazilian communities in the northeastern United States, and Florida and Georgia. Brazilians settled throughout the metropolitan area; most were undocumented. In January 2008, the New Orleans Brazilian population had a mid-range estimate of 3,000 people. By 2008, Brazilians had opened many small churches, shops and restaurants catering to their community.

Among the growing Asian American community, the earliest Filipino Americans to live within the city arrived in the early 1800s. The Vietnamese American community grew to become the largest by 2010 as many fled the aftermath of the Vietnam War in the 1970s.

=== Sexual orientation and gender identity ===
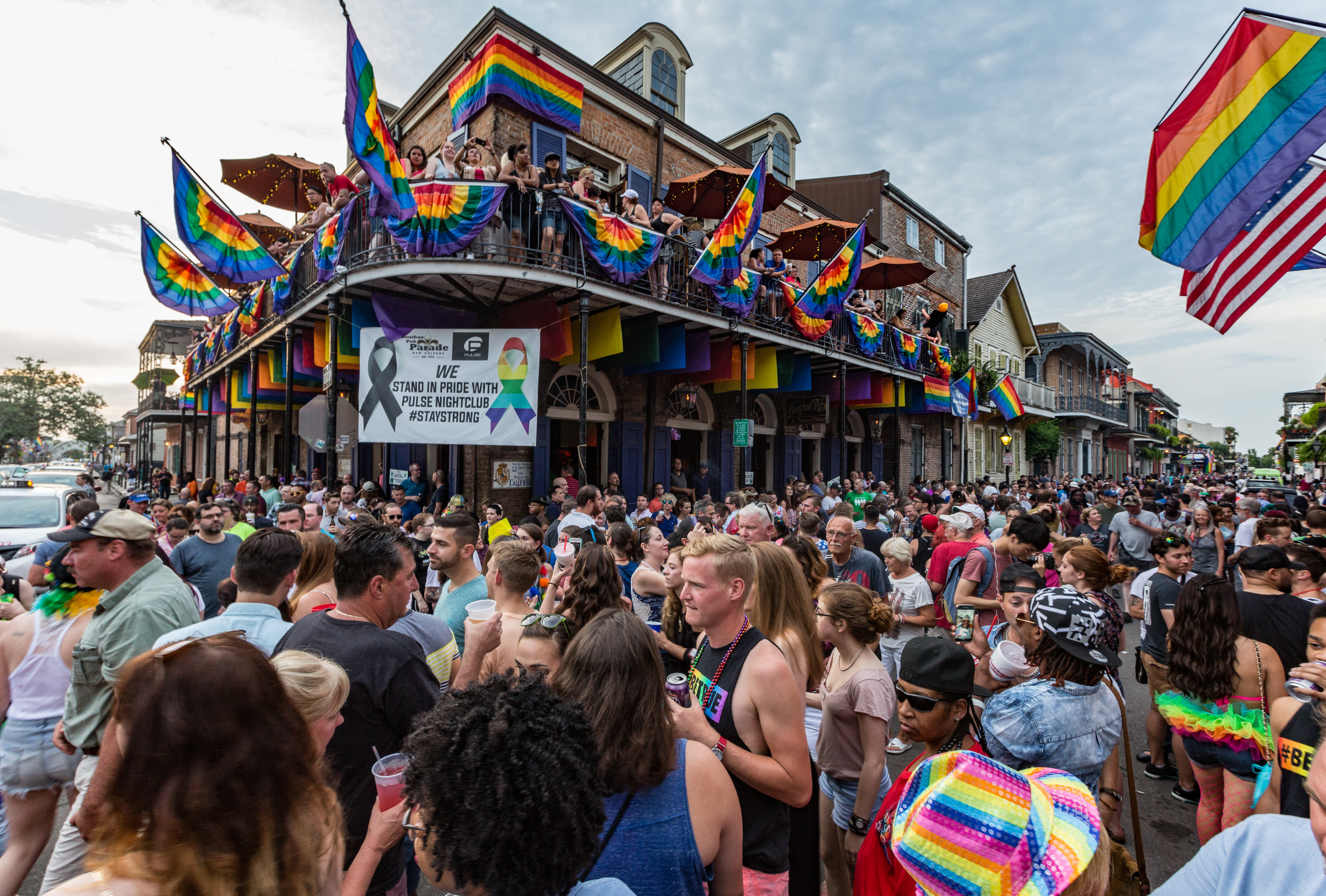
2016 New Orleans Pride

New Orleans and its metropolitan area have historically been popular destinations for lesbian, gay, bisexual, and transgender communities. In 2015, a Gallup survey determined New Orleans was one of the largest cities in the American South with a significant LGBT population. Much of the LGBT community in New Orleans lives near the Central Business District, Mid-City, and Uptown; several gay bars and nightclubs are present in those areas.

=== Religion ===
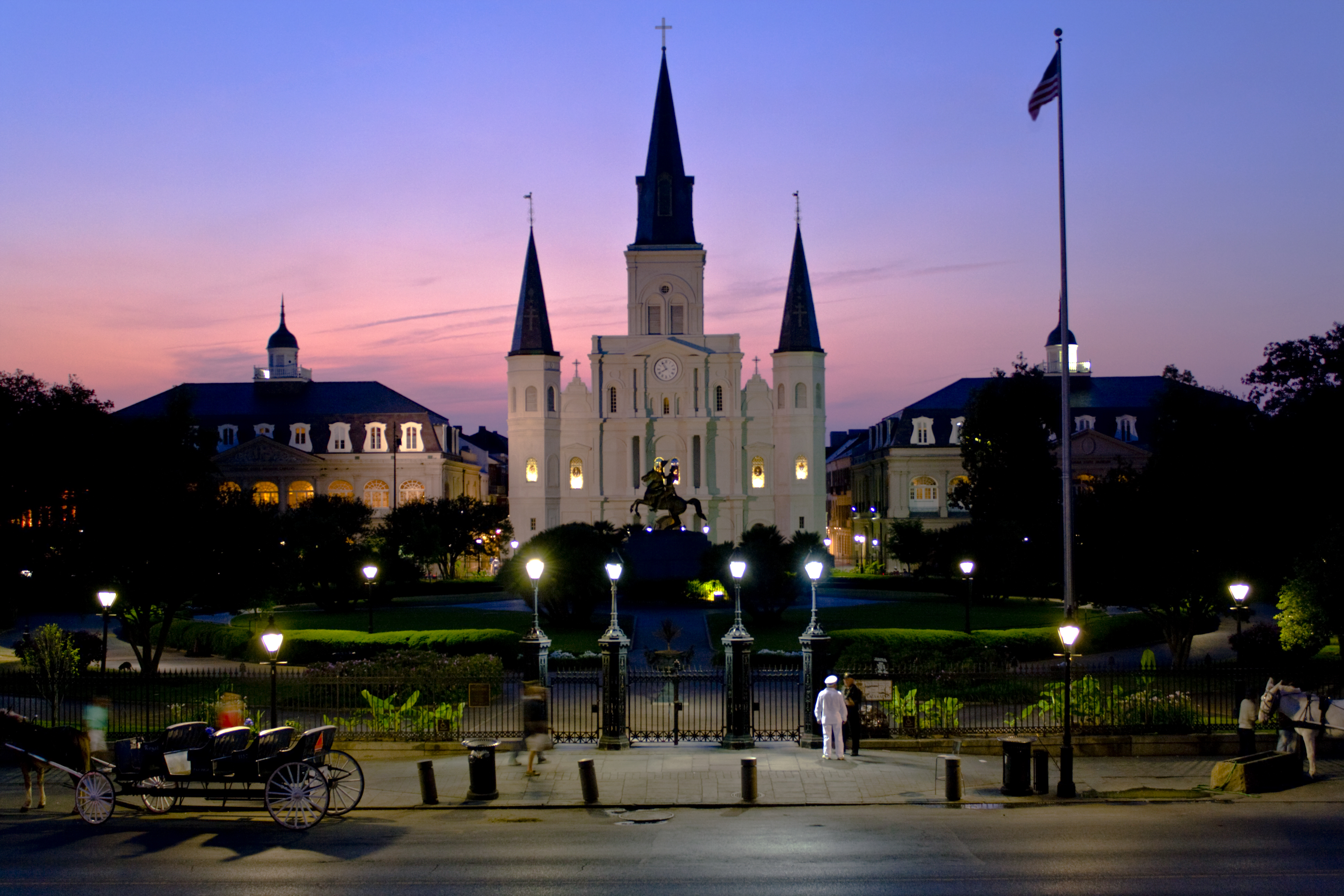
Cathedral-Basilica of St. Louis, King of France

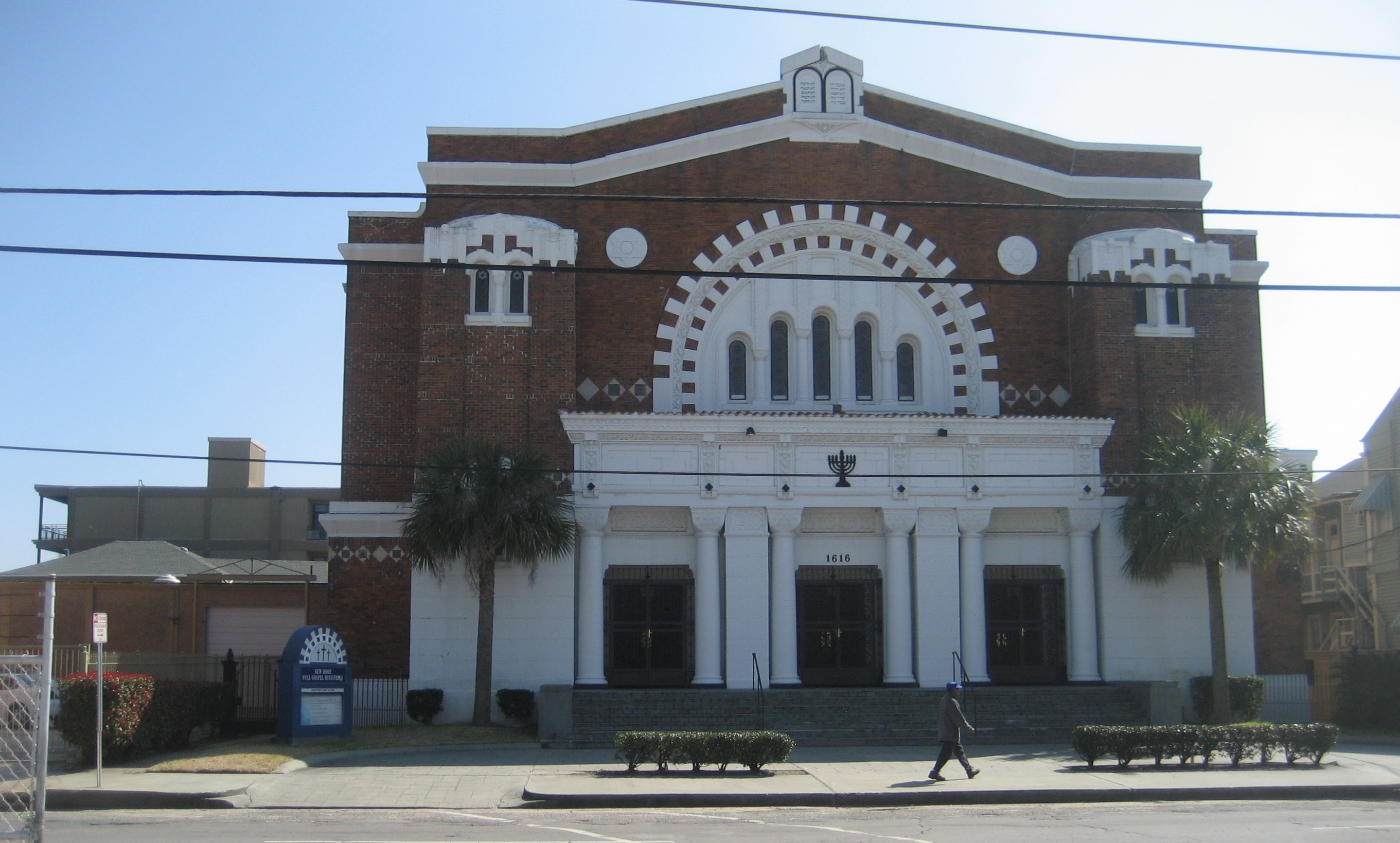
Beth Israel synagogue building on Carondelet Street

New Orleans's colonial history of French and Spanish settlement generated a strong Roman Catholic tradition. Catholic missions ministered to slaves and free people of color and established schools for them. In addition, many late 19th and early 20th century European immigrants, such as the Irish, some Germans, and Italians were Catholic. Within the Roman Catholic Archdiocese of New Orleans (which includes not only the city but the surrounding parishes as well), 40% percent of the population was Roman Catholic since 2016. Catholicism is reflected in French and Spanish cultural traditions, including its many parochial schools, street names, architecture and festivals, including Mardi Gras. Within the city and metropolitan area, Catholicism is also reflected in the Black and African cultural traditions with Gospel mass. The statue of Our Lady of Prompt Succor is a notable symbol of the Catholic faith in New Orleans and throughout Louisiana.

Influenced by the Bible Belt's prominent Protestant population, New Orleans also has a sizable non-Catholic Christian demographic. Roughly the majority of Protestant Christians were Baptist, and the city proper's largest non-Catholic bodies were the Southern Baptist Convention, the National Missionary Baptist Convention of America, non-denominationals, the National Baptist Convention, the United Methodist Church, the Episcopal Church, the African Methodist Episcopal Church, the National Baptist Convention of America, and the Church of God in Christ according to the Association of Religion Data Archives in 2020.

New Orleans displays a distinctive variety of Louisiana Voodoo, due in part to syncretism with African and Afro-Caribbean Roman Catholic beliefs. The fame of voodoo practitioner Marie Laveau contributed to this, as did New Orleans's Caribbean cultural influences. Although the tourism industry strongly associated Voodoo with the city, only a small number of people are serious adherents.

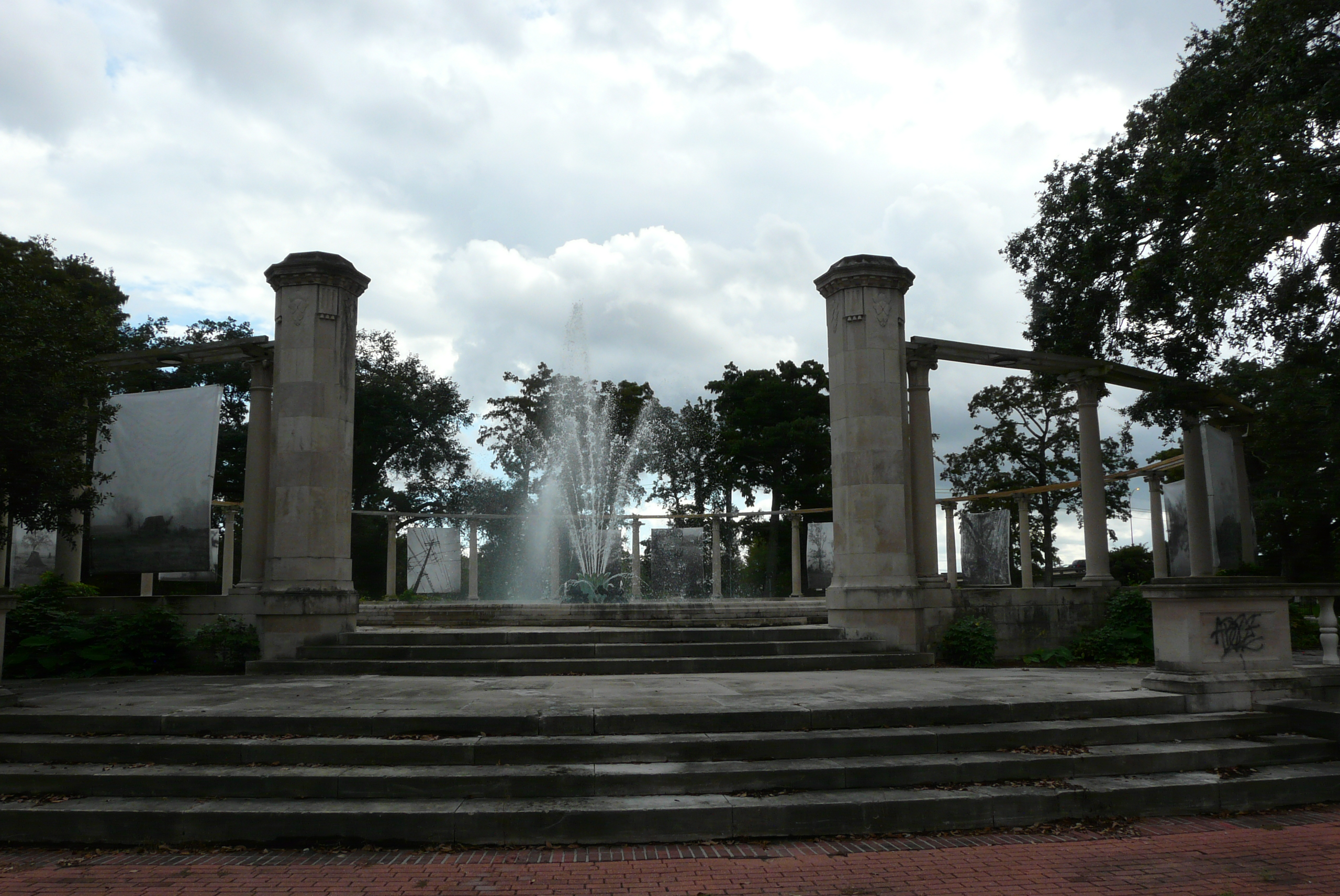
Popp Fountain in City Park, a meeting place for The Religious Order of Witchcraft

New Orleans was also home to the occultist Mary Oneida Toups, who was nicknamed the "Witch Queen of New Orleans". Toups' coven, The Religious Order of Witchcraft, was the first coven to be officially recognized as a religious institution by the state of Louisiana. They would meet at Popp Fountain in City Park.

Jewish settlers, primarily Sephardim, settled in New Orleans from the early nineteenth century. Some migrated from the communities established in the colonial years in Charleston, South Carolina, and Savannah, Georgia. The merchant Abraham Cohen Labatt helped found the first Jewish congregation in New Orleans in the 1830s, which became known as the Portuguese Jewish Nefutzot Yehudah congregation (he and some other members were Sephardic Jews, whose ancestors had lived in Portugal and Spain). Ashkenazi Jews from eastern Europe immigrated in the late 19th and 20th centuries.

By the beginning of the 21st century, 10,000 Jews lived in New Orleans. This number dropped to 7,000 after Hurricane Katrina, but rose again after efforts to incentivize the community's growth resulted in the arrival of about an additional 2,000 Jews. New Orleans synagogues lost members, but most re-opened in their original locations. The exception was Congregation Beth Israel, the oldest and most prominent Orthodox synagogue in the New Orleans region. Beth Israel's building in Lakeview was destroyed by flooding. After seven years of holding services in temporary quarters, the congregation consecrated a new synagogue on land purchased from the Reform Congregation Gates of Prayer in Metairie.

A visible religious minority, Muslims constituted 0.6% of the religious population as of 2019 according to Sperling's BestPlaces. The Association of Religion Data Archives in 2020 estimated that there were 6,150 Muslims in the city proper. The Islamic demographic in New Orleans and its metropolitan area have been mainly made up of Middle Eastern immigrants and African Americans.

== Economy ==
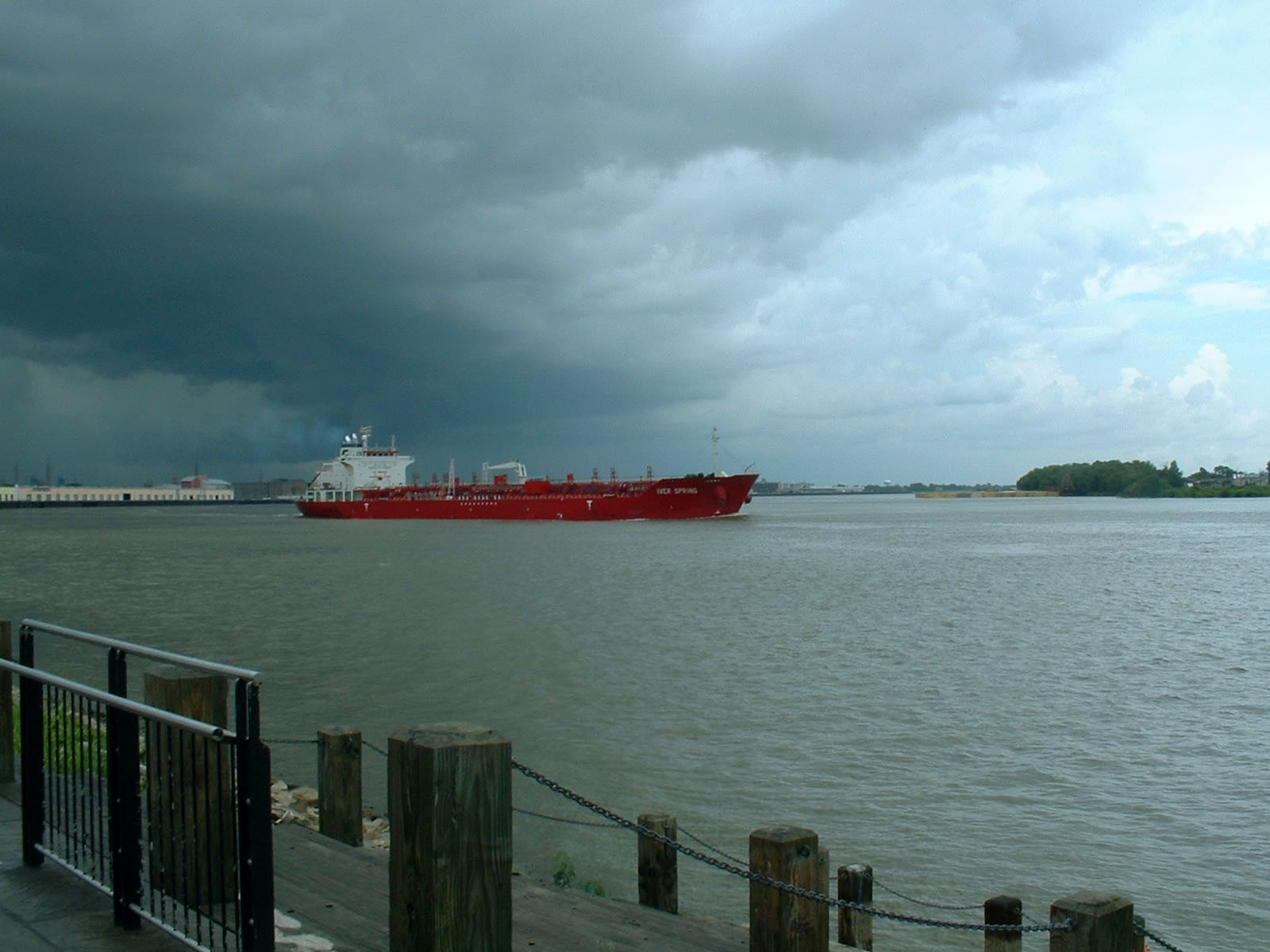
A tanker on the Mississippi River in New Orleans

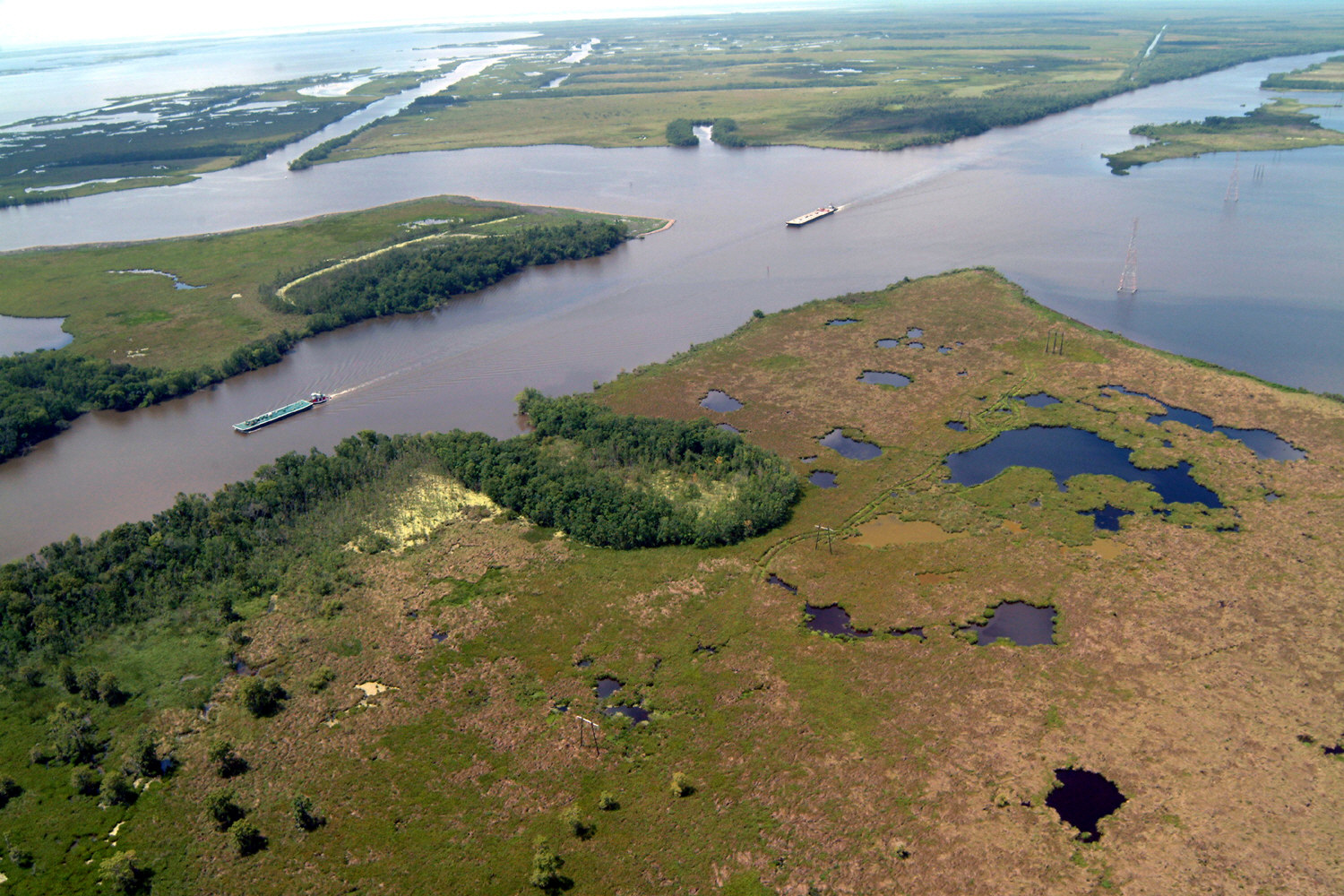
Intracoastal Waterway near New Orleans

New Orleans operates one of the world's largest and busiest ports and metropolitan New Orleans is a center of maritime industry. The region accounts for a significant portion of the nation's oil refining and petrochemical production, and serves as a white-collar corporate base for onshore and offshore petroleum and natural gas production. Since the beginning of the 21st century, New Orleans has also grown into a technology hub.

New Orleans is also a center for higher learning, with over 50,000 students enrolled in the region's eleven two- and four-year degree-granting institutions. Tulane University, a top-50 research university, is located in Uptown. Metropolitan New Orleans is a major regional hub for the health care industry and boasts a small, globally competitive manufacturing sector. The center city possesses a rapidly growing, entrepreneurial creative industries sector and is renowned for its cultural tourism. Greater New Orleans, Inc. (GNO, Inc.) acts as the first point-of-contact for regional economic development, coordinating between Louisiana's Department of Economic Development and the various business development agencies.

=== Port ===
New Orleans began as a strategically located trading entrepôt and it remains, above all, a crucial transportation hub and distribution center for waterborne commerce. The Port of New Orleans is the fifth-largest in the United States based on cargo volume, and second-largest in the state after the Port of South Louisiana. It is the twelfth-largest in the U.S. based on cargo value. The Port of South Louisiana, also located in the New Orleans area, is the world's busiest in terms of bulk tonnage. When combined with Port of New Orleans, it forms the 4th-largest port system in volume. Many shipbuilding, shipping, logistics, freight forwarding and commodity brokerage firms either are based in metropolitan New Orleans or maintain a local presence. Examples include Intermarine, Bisso Towboat, Northrop Grumman Ship Systems, Trinity Yachts, Expeditors International, Bollinger Shipyards, IMTT, International Coffee Corp, Boasso America, Transoceanic Shipping, Transportation Consultants Inc., Dupuy Storage & Forwarding and Silocaf. The largest coffee-roasting plant in the world, operated by Folgers, is located in New Orleans East.

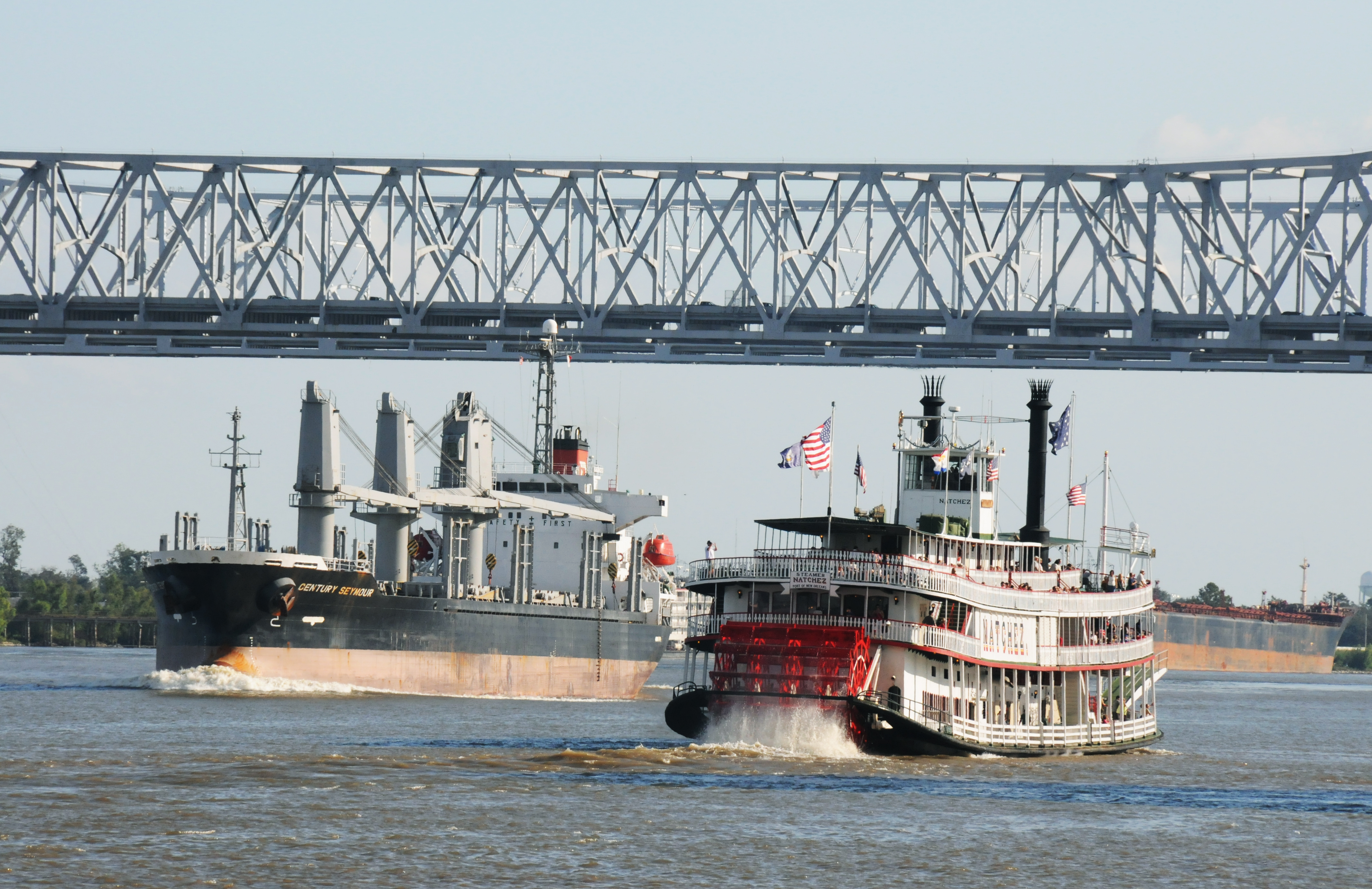
The steamboat Natchez operates out of New Orleans.

New Orleans is located near to the Gulf of Mexico and its many oil rigs. Louisiana ranks fifth among states in oil production and eighth in reserves. It has two of the four Strategic Petroleum Reserve (SPR) storage facilities: West Hackberry in Cameron Parish and Bayou Choctaw in Iberville Parish. The area hosts 17 petroleum refineries, with a combined crude oil distillation capacity of nearly 2.8 million barrels per day (450,000 m^{3}/d), the second highest after Texas. Louisiana's numerous ports include the Louisiana Offshore Oil Port (LOOP), which is capable of receiving the largest oil tankers. Given the quantity of oil imports, Louisiana is home to many major pipelines: Crude Oil (Exxon, Chevron, BP, Texaco, Shell, Scurloch-Permian, Mid-Valley, Calumet, Conoco, Koch Inc., Unocal, U.S. Dept. of Energy, Locap); Product (TEPPCO Partners, Colonial, Plantation, Explorer, Texaco, Collins); and Liquefied Petroleum Gas (Dixie, TEPPCO, Black Lake, Koch, Chevron, Dynegy, Kinder Morgan Energy Partners, Dow Chemical Company, Bridgeline, FMP, Tejas, Texaco, UTP). Several energy companies have regional headquarters in the area, including Shell plc, Eni and Chevron. Other energy producers and oilfield services companies are headquartered in the city or region, and the sector supports a large professional services base of specialized engineering and design firms, as well as a term office for the federal government's Minerals Management Service.

=== Business ===
The city is the home to a single Fortune 500 company: Entergy, a power generation utility and nuclear power plant operations specialist. After Katrina, the city lost its other Fortune 500 company, Freeport-McMoRan, when it merged its copper and gold exploration unit with an Arizona company and relocated that division to Phoenix. Its McMoRan Exploration affiliate remains headquartered in New Orleans.

Companies with significant operations or headquarters in New Orleans include: Pan American Life Insurance, Pool Corp, Rolls-Royce, Newpark Resources, AT&T, TurboSquid, iSeatz, IBM, Navtech, Superior Energy Services, Textron Marine & Land Systems, McDermott International, Pellerin Milnor, Lockheed Martin, Imperial Trading, Laitram, Harrah's Entertainment, Stewart Enterprises, Edison Chouest Offshore, Zatarain's, Waldemar S. Nelson & Co., Whitney National Bank, Capital One, Tidewater Marine, Popeyes Chicken & Biscuits, Parsons Brinckerhoff, MWH Global, CH2M Hill, Energy Partners Ltd, The Receivables Exchange, GE Capital, and Smoothie King.

Entrepreneurship is encouraged, with a number of initiatives designed to support small business and start-ups, including Entrepreneurs' Row and the New Orleans Startup Fund.

=== Tourist and convention business ===
Tourism is a staple of the city's economy. Perhaps more visible than any other sector, New Orleans's tourist and convention industry is a $5.5 billion industry that accounts for 40 percent of city tax revenues. In 2004, the hospitality industry employed 85,000 people, making it the city's top economic sector as measured by employment. New Orleans also hosts the World Cultural Economic Forum (WCEF). The forum, held annually at the New Orleans Morial Convention Center, is directed toward promoting cultural and economic development opportunities through the strategic convening of cultural ambassadors and leaders from around the world. The first WCEF took place in October 2008.

=== Federal and military agencies ===
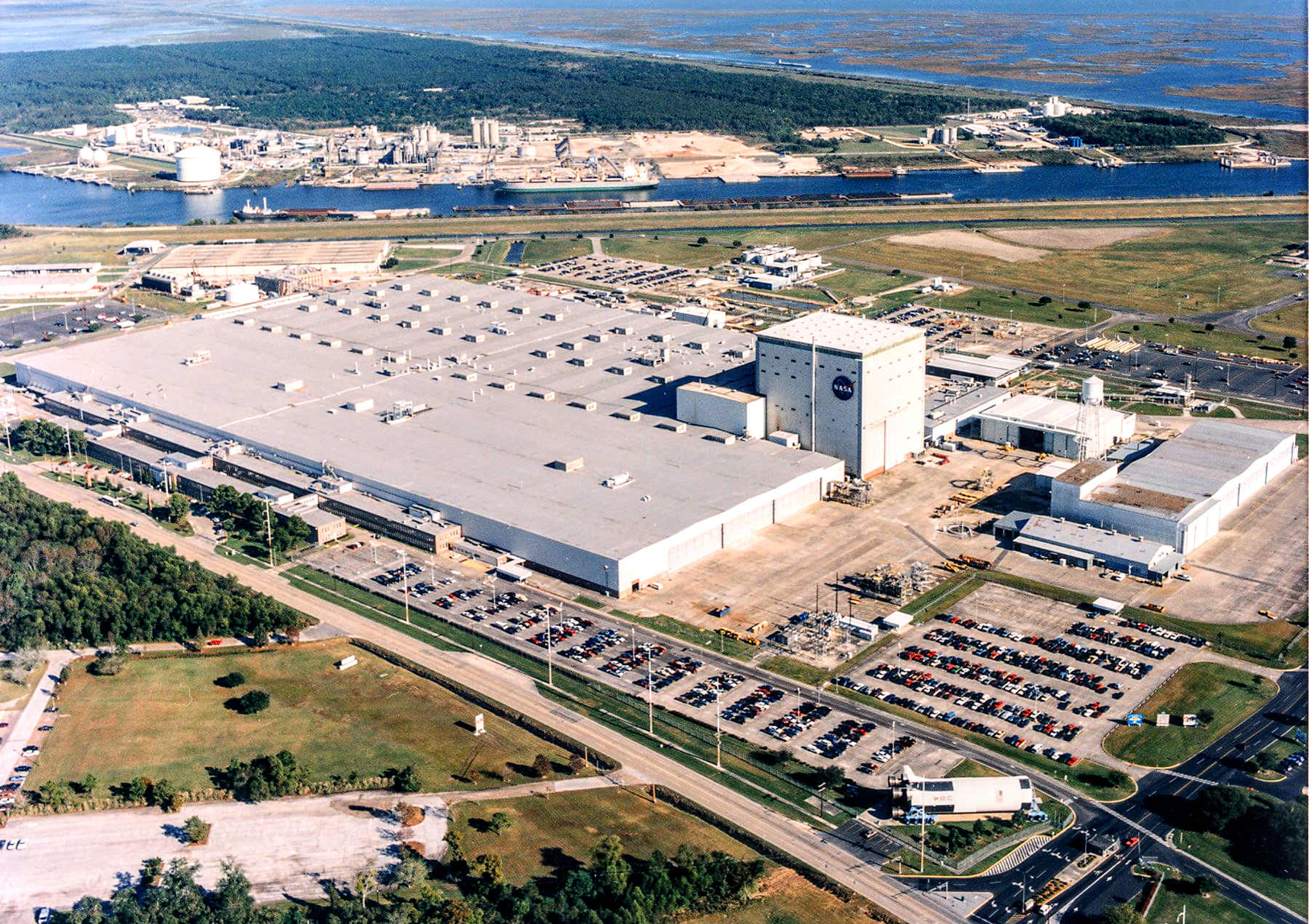
Aerial view of NASA's Michoud Assembly Facility

Federal agencies and the Armed forces operate significant facilities there. The U.S. Fifth Circuit Court of Appeals operates at the US. Courthouse downtown. NASA's Michoud Assembly Facility is located in New Orleans East and has multiple tenants including Lockheed Martin and Boeing. It is a huge manufacturing complex that produced the external fuel tanks for the Space Shuttles, the Saturn V first stage, the Integrated Truss Structure of the International Space Station, and is now used for the construction of NASA's Space Launch System. The rocket factory lies within the enormous New Orleans Regional Business Park, also home to the National Finance Center, operated by the United States Department of Agriculture (USDA), and the Crescent Crown distribution center. Other large governmental installations include the U.S. Navy's Space and Naval Warfare (SPAWAR) Systems Command, located within the University of New Orleans Research and Technology Park in Gentilly, Naval Air Station Joint Reserve Base New Orleans; and the headquarters for the Marine Force Reserves in Federal City in Algiers.

== Culture and contemporary life ==
=== Tourism ===
New Orleans has many visitor attractions, from the world-renowned French Quarter to St. Charles Avenue, (home of Tulane and Loyola universities, the historic Pontchartrain Hotel and many 19th-century mansions) to Magazine Street with its boutique stores and antique shops.

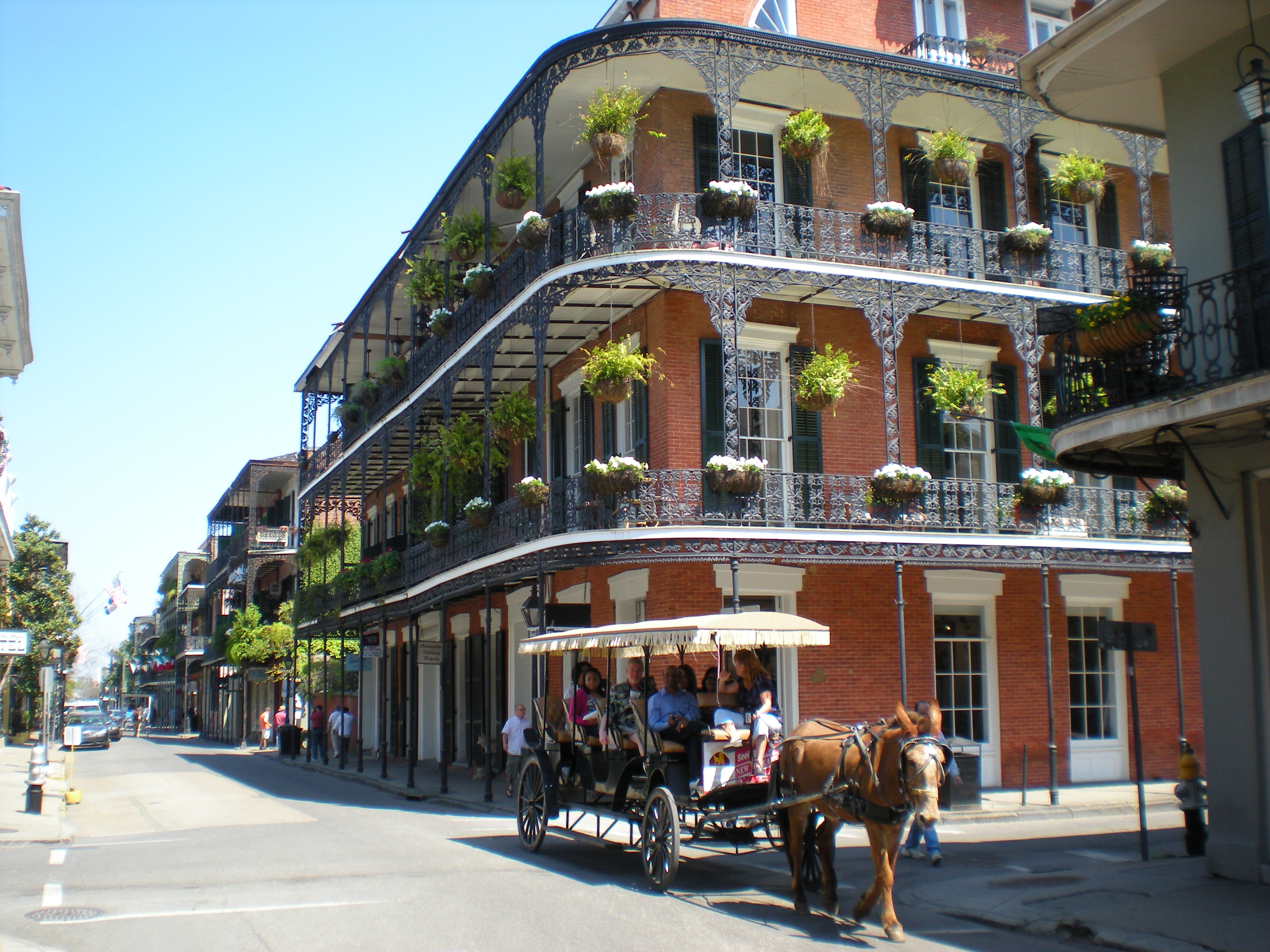
The French Quarter in 2009

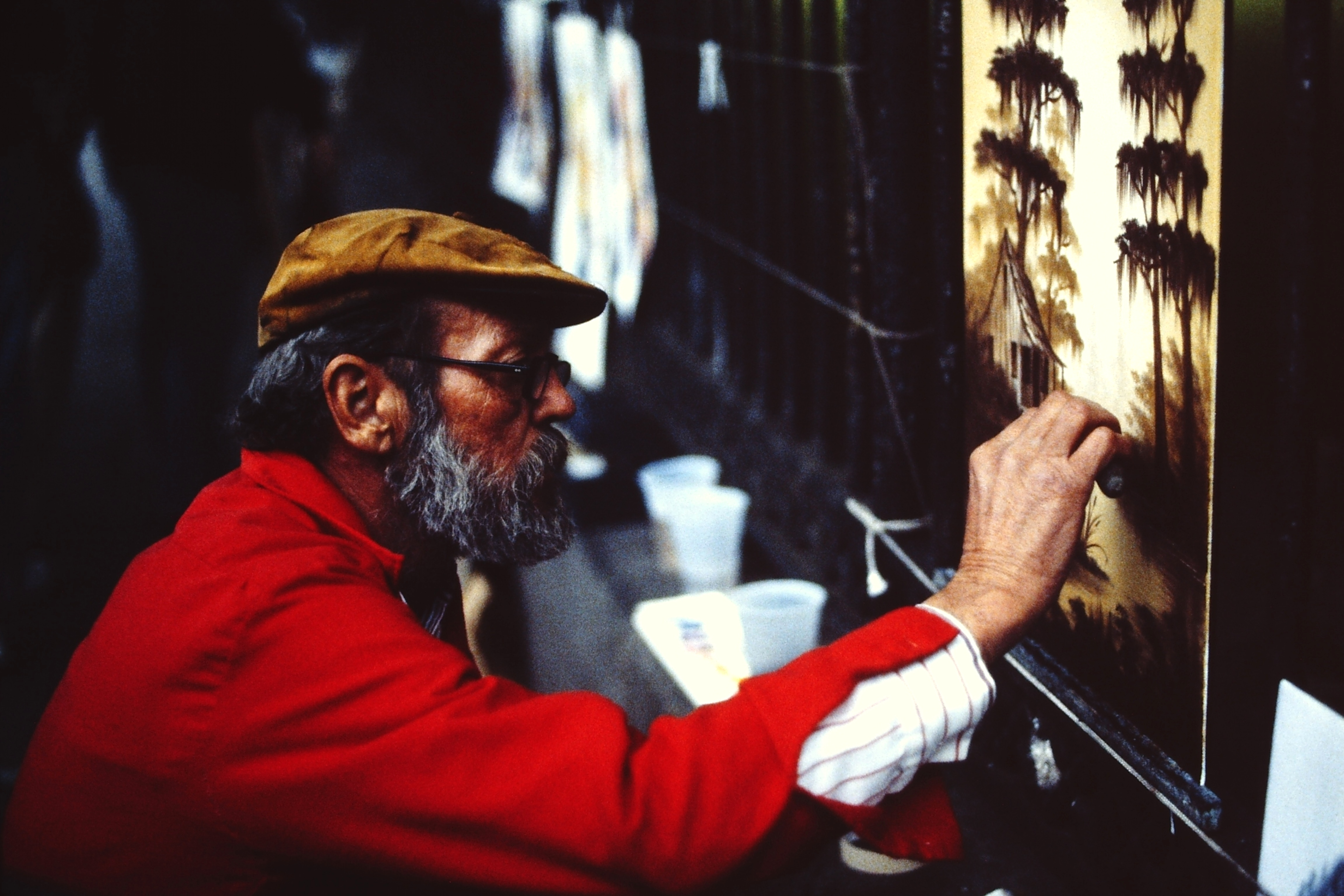
A street artist in the French Quarter, 1988

According to current travel guides, New Orleans is one of the top ten most-visited cities in the United States; 10.1 million visitors came to New Orleans in 2004. Prior to Katrina, 265 hotels with 38,338 rooms operated in the Greater New Orleans Area. In May 2007, that had declined to some 140 hotels and motels with over 31,000 rooms.

A 2009 Travel + Leisure poll of "America's Favorite Cities" ranked New Orleans first in ten categories, the most first-place rankings of the 30 cities included. According to the poll, New Orleans was the best U.S. city as a spring break destination and for "wild weekends", stylish boutique hotels, cocktail hours, singles/bar scenes, live music/concerts and bands, antique and vintage shops, cafés/coffee bars, neighborhood restaurants, and people watching. The city ranked second for: friendliness (behind Charleston, South Carolina), gay-friendliness (behind San Francisco), bed and breakfast hotels/inns, and ethnic food. However, the city placed near the bottom in cleanliness, safety and as a family destination.

The French Quarter (known locally as "the Quarter" or Vieux Carré), which was the colonial-era city and is bounded by the Mississippi River, Rampart Street, Canal Street, and Esplanade Avenue, contains popular hotels, bars and nightclubs. Notable tourist attractions in the Quarter include Bourbon Street, Jackson Square, St. Louis Cathedral, the French Market (including Café du Monde, famous for café au lait and beignets) and Preservation Hall. Also in the French Quarter is the old New Orleans Mint, a former branch of the United States Mint which now operates as a museum, and The Historic New Orleans Collection, a museum and research center housing art and artifacts relating to the history and the Gulf South.

Close to the Quarter is the Tremé community, which contains the New Orleans Jazz National Historical Park and the New Orleans African American Museum—a site which is listed on the Louisiana African American Heritage Trail.

The Natchez is an authentic steamboat with a calliope that cruises the length of the city twice daily. Unlike most other places in the United States, New Orleans has become widely known for its elegant decay. The city's historic cemeteries and their distinct above-ground tombs are attractions in themselves, the oldest and most famous of which, Saint Louis Cemetery, greatly resembles Père Lachaise Cemetery in Paris.

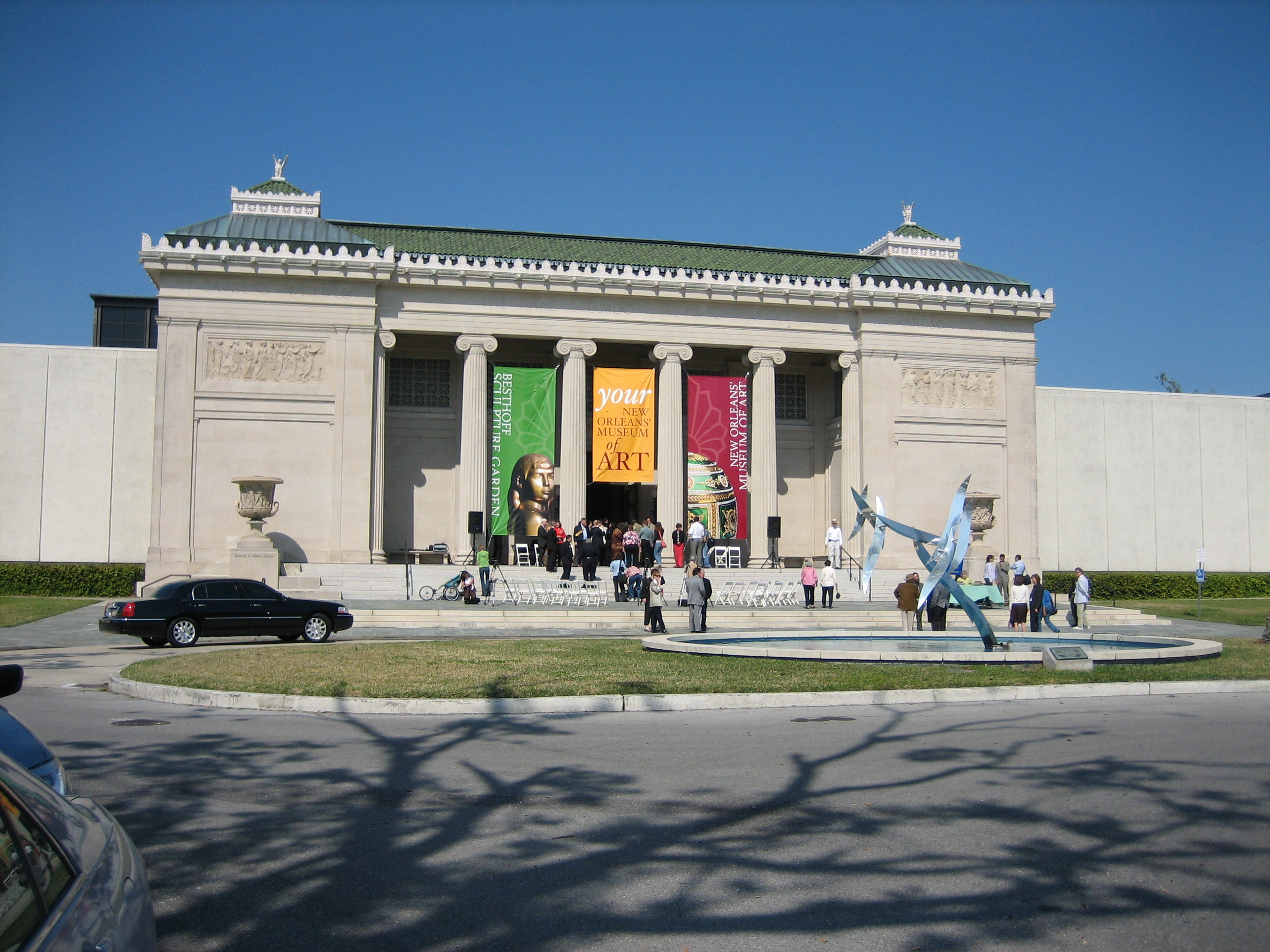
The New Orleans Museum of Art (NOMA) located in City Park

The National WWII Museum offers a multi-building odyssey through the history of the Pacific and European theaters. Nearby, Confederate Memorial Hall Museum, the oldest continually operating museum in Louisiana (although under renovation since Hurricane Katrina), contains the second-largest collection of Confederate memorabilia. Art museums include the Contemporary Arts Center, the New Orleans Museum of Art (NOMA) in City Park, and the Ogden Museum of Southern Art.

New Orleans is home to the Audubon Nature Institute (which consists of Audubon Park, the Audubon Zoo, the Aquarium of the Americas and the Audubon Insectarium), and home to gardens which include Longue Vue House and Gardens and the New Orleans Botanical Garden. City Park, one of the country's most expansive and visited urban parks, has one of the largest stands of oak trees in the world.

Other points of interest can be found in the surrounding areas. Many wetlands are found nearby, including Honey Island Swamp and Barataria Preserve. Chalmette Battlefield and National Cemetery, located just south of the city, is the site of the 1815 Battle of New Orleans.

=== Entertainment and performing arts ===
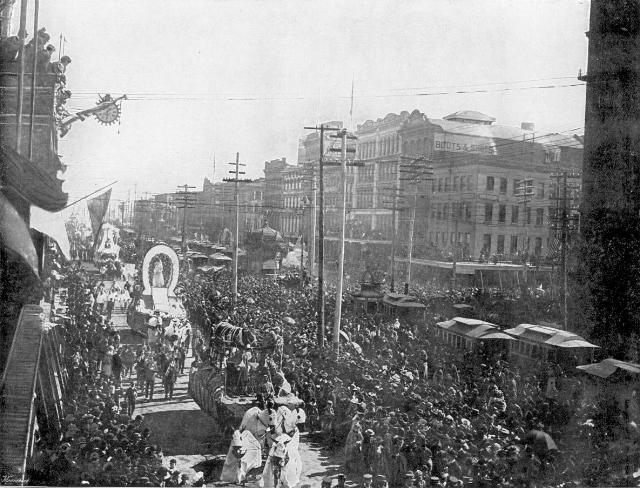
New Orleans Mardi Gras in the early 1890s

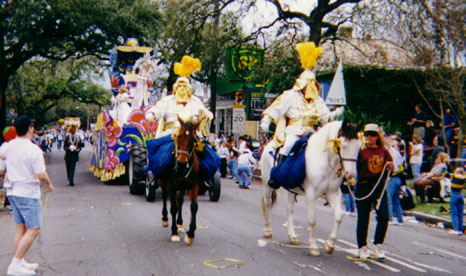
Mounted krewe officers in the Thoth Parade during Mardi Gras

The New Orleans area is home to numerous annual celebrations. The most well known is Carnival, or Mardi Gras. Carnival officially begins on the Feast of the Epiphany, also known in some Christian traditions as the "Twelfth Night" of Christmas. Mardi Gras (French for "Fat Tuesday"), the final and grandest day of traditional Catholic festivities, is the last Tuesday before the Christian liturgical season of Lent, which commences on Ash Wednesday.

The largest of the city's many music festivals is the New Orleans Jazz & Heritage Festival. Commonly referred to simply as "Jazz Fest", it is one of the nation's largest music festivals. The festival features a variety of music, including both native Louisiana and international artists. Along with Jazz Fest, New Orleans's Voodoo Experience ("Voodoo Fest") and the Essence Music Festival also feature local and international artists.

Other major festivals include Southern Decadence, the French Quarter Festival, and the Tennessee Williams/New Orleans Literary Festival. The American playwright lived and wrote in New Orleans early in his career, and set his play, Streetcar Named Desire, there.

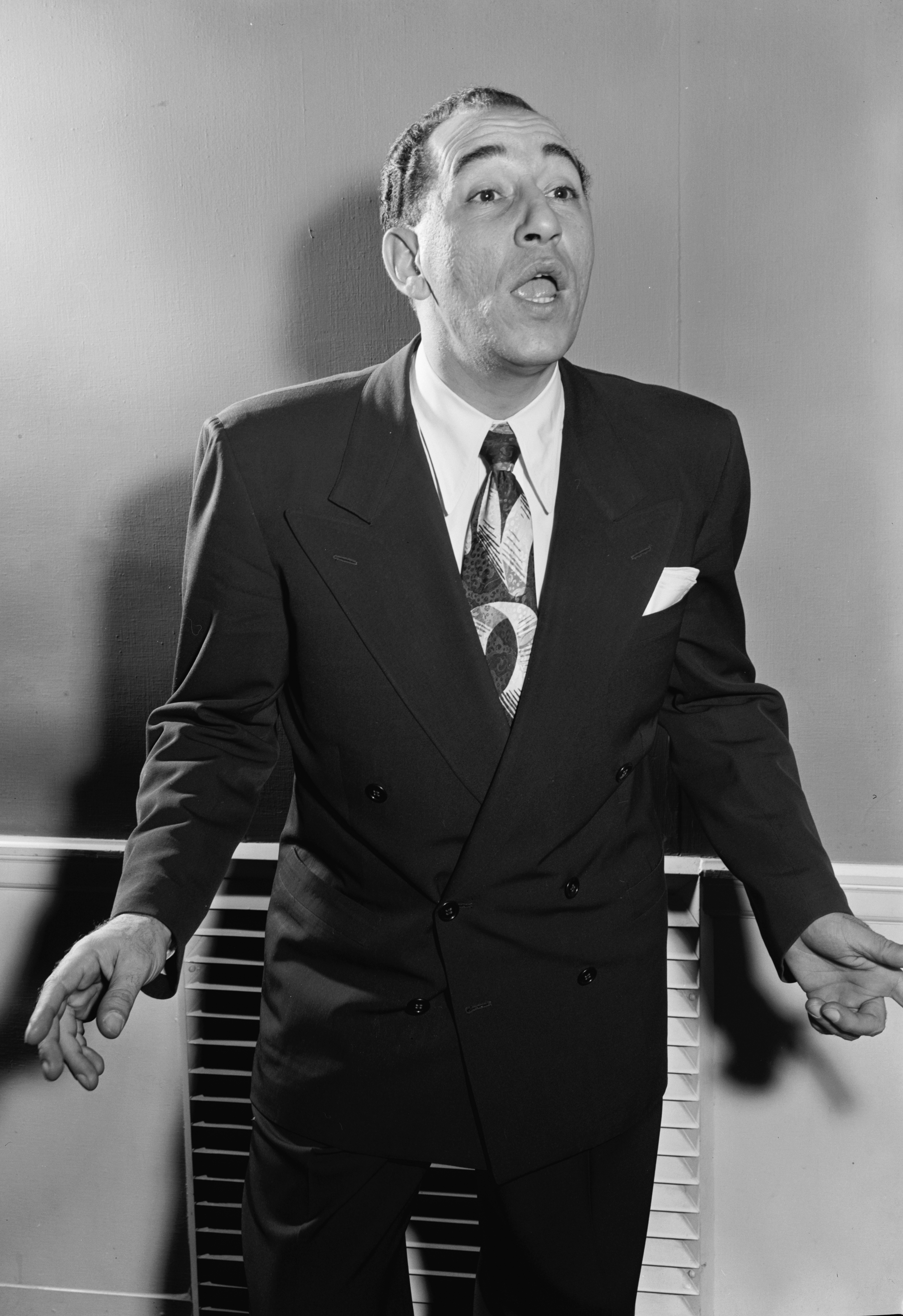
Louis Prima; a famous New Orleans jazz, swing music, and jump blues, musician.

In 2002, Louisiana began offering tax incentives for film and television production. Films produced in and around the city include Ray, Runaway Jury, The Pelican Brief, Glory Road, All the King's Men, Déjà Vu, Last Holiday, The Curious Case of Benjamin Button, 12 Years a Slave, and Project Power.

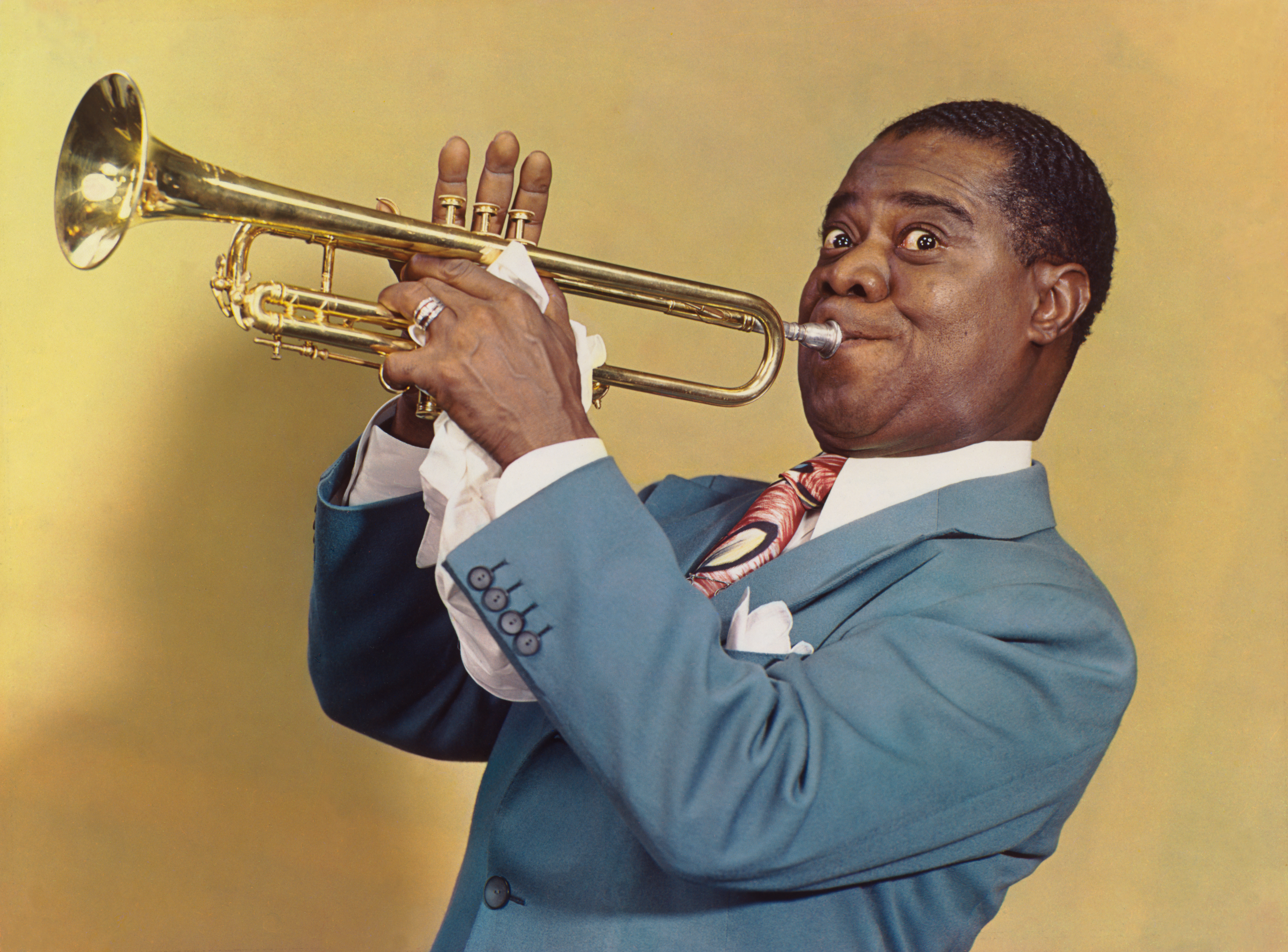
Louis Armstrong, famous New Orleans jazz musician

The first theatre in New Orleans was the French-language Theatre de la Rue Saint Pierre, which opened in 1792. The first opera in New Orleans was performed there in 1796. In the nineteenth century, the city was the home of two of America's most important venues for French opera, the Théâtre d'Orléans and later the French Opera House. Today, opera is performed by the New Orleans Opera. The Marigny Opera House is home to the Marigny Opera Ballet and also hosts opera, jazz, and classical music performances.

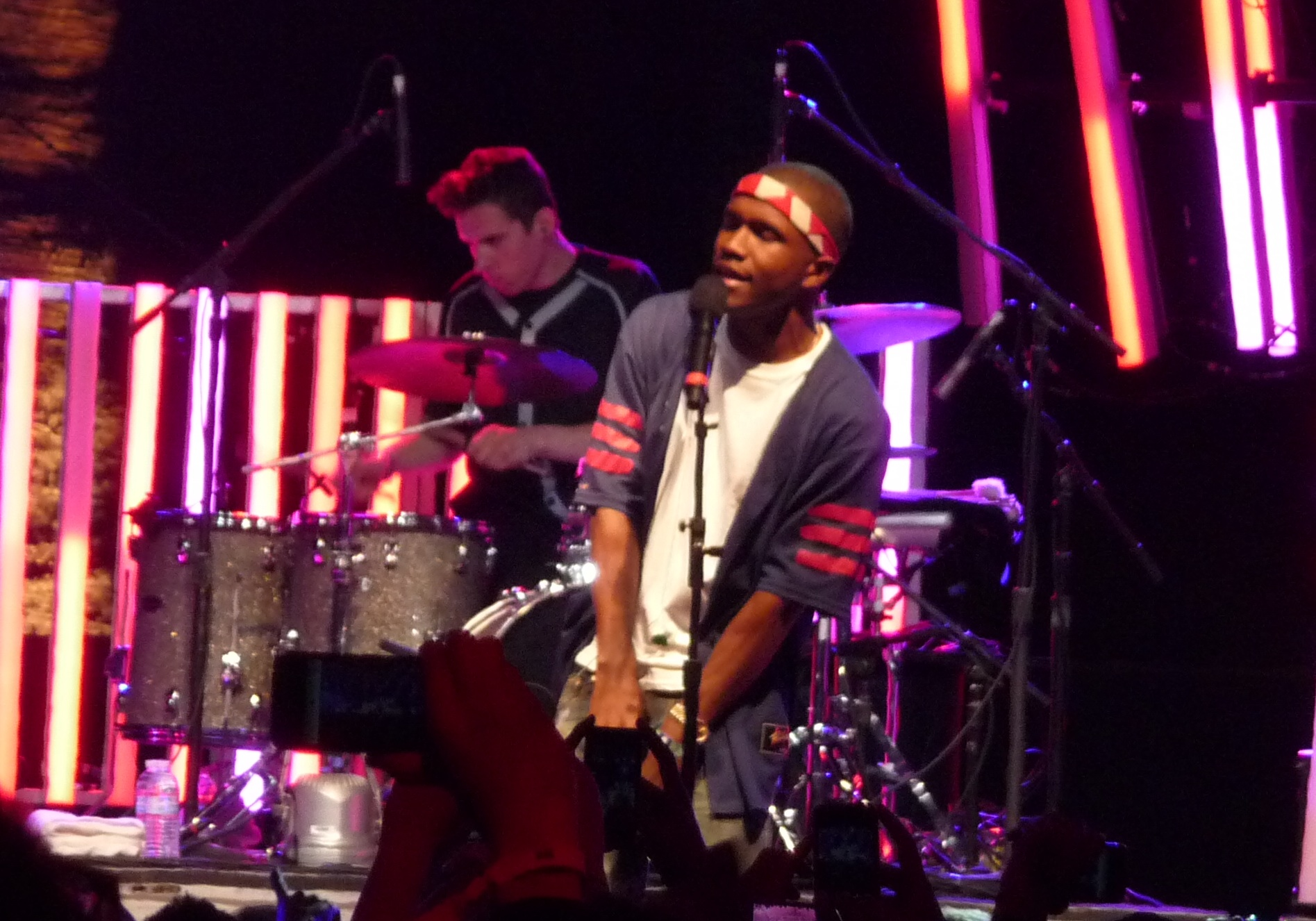
Frank Ocean is a musician from New Orleans.

New Orleans has long been a significant center for music, showcasing its intertwined European, African and Latino American cultures. The city's unique musical heritage was born in its colonial and early American days from a unique blending of European musical instruments with African rhythms. As the only North American city to have allowed slaves to gather in public and play their native music (largely in Congo Square, now located within Louis Armstrong Park), New Orleans gave birth in the early 20th century to an epochal indigenous music: jazz. Soon, African American brass bands formed, beginning a century-long tradition. The Louis Armstrong Park area, near the French Quarter in Tremé, contains the New Orleans Jazz National Historical Park. The city's music was later also significantly influenced by Acadiana, home of Cajun and Zydeco music, and by Delta blues.

New Orleans's unique musical culture is on display in its traditional funerals. A spin on military funerals, New Orleans's traditional funerals feature sad music (mostly dirges and hymns) in processions on the way to the cemetery and happier music (hot jazz) on the way back. Until the 1990s, most locals preferred to call these "funerals with music". Visitors to the city have long dubbed them "jazz funerals".

Much later in its musical development, New Orleans was home to a distinctive brand of rhythm and blues that contributed greatly to the growth of rock and roll. An example of the New Orleans's sound in the 1960s is the No. 1 U.S. hit "Chapel of Love" by the Dixie Cups, a song which knocked the Beatles out of the top spot on the Billboard Hot 100. New Orleans became a hotbed for funk music in the 1960s and 1970s, and by the late 1980s, it had developed its own localized variant of hip-hop, called bounce music. While not commercially successful outside of the Deep South, bounce music was immensely popular in poorer neighborhoods throughout the 1990s.

A cousin of bounce, New Orleans hip-hop achieved commercial success locally and internationally, producing Lil Wayne, Master P, Birdman, Juvenile, Suicideboys, Cash Money Records and No Limit Records. Additionally, the popularity of cowpunk, a fast form of southern rock, originated with the help of several local bands, such as The Radiators, Better Than Ezra, Cowboy Mouth and Dash Rip Rock. Throughout the 1990s, many sludge metal bands started. New Orleans's heavy metal bands such as Eyehategod, Soilent Green, Crowbar, and Down incorporated styles such as hardcore punk, doom metal, and southern rock to create an original and heady brew of swampy and aggravated metal that has largely avoided standardization.

New Orleans is the southern terminus of the famed Highway 61, made musically famous by musician Bob Dylan in his song, "Highway 61 Revisited".

=== Cuisine ===
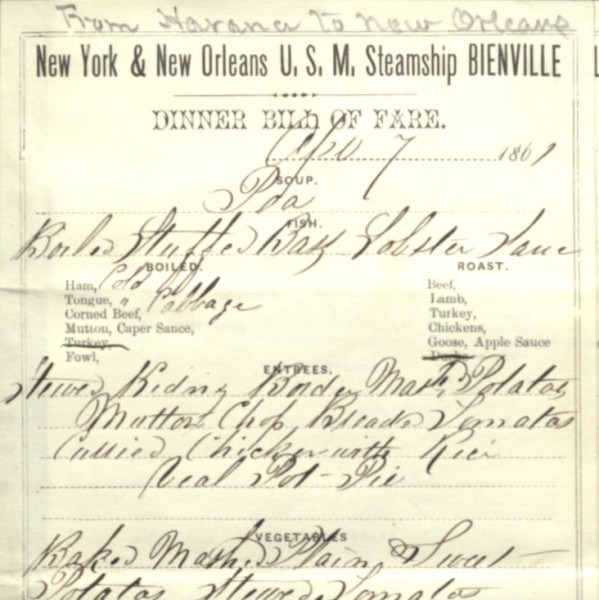
Steamship Bienville on-board restaurant menu (April 7, 1861)

New Orleans is world-famous for its cuisine. The indigenous cuisine is distinctive and influential. New Orleans food combined local Creole, haute Creole and New Orleans French cuisines. Local ingredients, French, Spanish, Italian, African, Native American, Cajun, Chinese, and a hint of Cuban traditions combine to produce a truly unique and easily recognizable New Orleans flavor.

New Orleans is known for specialties including beignets (locally pronounced like "ben-yays"), square-shaped fried dough that could be called "French doughnuts" (served with café au lait made with a blend of coffee and chicory rather than only coffee); and po' boy and Italian muffuletta sandwiches; Gulf oysters on the half-shell, fried oysters, boiled crawfish and other seafood; étouffée, jambalaya, gumbo and other Creole dishes; and the Monday favorite of red beans and rice (Louis Armstrong often signed his letters, "Red beans and ricely yours"). Another New Orleans specialty is the praline locally /ˈprɑːliːn/, a candy made with brown sugar, granulated sugar, cream, butter, and pecans. The city offers notable street food including the Asian inspired beef Yaka mein.

=== Dialect ===
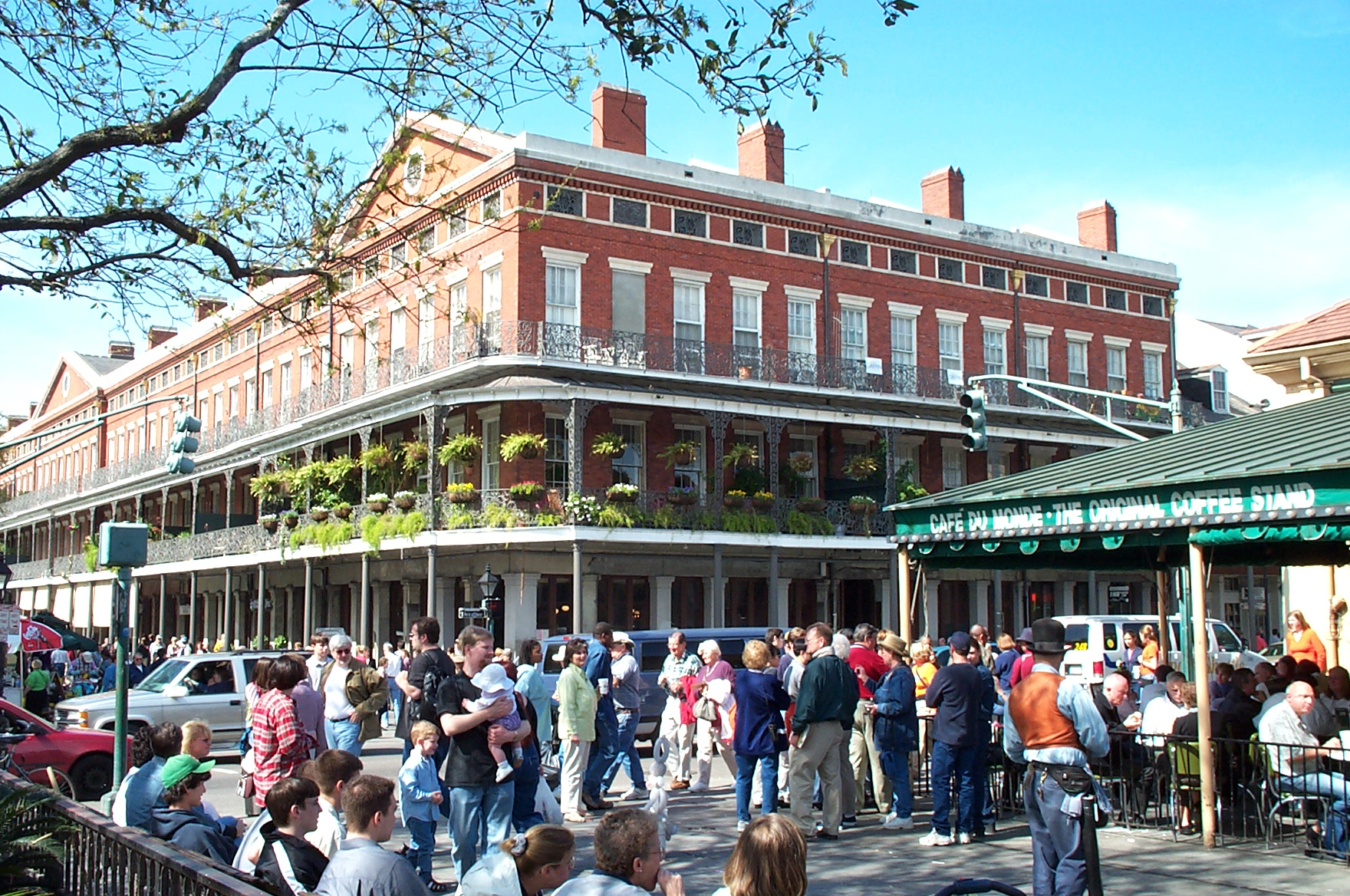
Café du Monde, a landmark New Orleans beignet cafe established in 1862

New Orleans developed a distinctive local dialect that is neither Cajun English nor the stereotypical Southern accent that is often misportrayed by film and television actors. Like earlier Southern Englishes, it features frequent deletion of the pre-consonantal "r", though the local white dialect also came to be quite similar to New York accents. No consensus describes how this happened, but it likely resulted from New Orleans's geographic isolation by water and the fact that the city was a major immigration port throughout the 19th century and early 20th century. Specifically, many members of European immigrant families originally raised in the cities of the Northeast, namely New York, moved to New Orleans during this time frame, bringing their Northeastern accents along with their Irish, Italian (especially Sicilian), German, and Jewish culture.

One of the strongest varieties of the New Orleans accent is sometimes identified as the Yat dialect, from the greeting "Where y'at?" This distinctive accent is dying out in the city, but remains strong in the surrounding parishes.

Less visibly, various ethnic groups throughout the area have retained distinct language traditions. The French-speaking community has had a cultural center, the Alliance Française of New Orleans, since 1984. The association is a chapter of the international Alliance Française organization and promotes French language and culture in New Orleans and the surrounding region. Since Louisiana became the first U.S. state to join the Organisation Internationale de la Francophonie in 2018, New Orleans has reemerged as an important center for the state's francophone and creolophone cultures and languages, as seen in new organizations such as the Nous Foundation. Although rare, Louisiana French and Louisiana Creole are still spoken in the city. There is also Louisiana-Canarian Spanish dialect, the Isleño Spanish, spoken by the Isleño people and older members of the population.

== Sports ==
| Club | Sport | League | Venue (capacity) | Founded | Titles | Record attendance | Status |
|---|---|---|---|---|---|---|---|
| New Orleans Saints | American football | NFL | Caesars Superdome (73,208) | 1967 | 1 | 73,373 | Active |
| New Orleans Hurricanes | Paintball | NXL | Has no home stadium | 2016 | 3 | Unknown | Active |
| New Orleans Pelicans | Basketball | NBA | Smoothie King Center (16,867) | 2002 | 0 | 18,444 | Active |
| Sugar Bowl | American football | NCAA | Caesars Superdome (73,208) | 1935 | 0 | 68,371 | Active |
| New Orleans Bowl | American football | NCAA | Caesars Superdome (73,208) | 2001 | 0 | 16,693 | Active |
| New Orleans Brass | Ice hockey | ECHL | Smoothie King Center (16,867) | 1999 | 0 | 11,000 | Defunct |
| New Orleans Gold | Ice hockey | MLR | Gold Mine on Airline (10,000) | 2017 | 0 | 2,500 | Defunct |

The fleur-de-lis is often a symbol of New Orleans and its sports teams.

New Orleans's professional sports teams include the 2009 Super Bowl XLIV champion New Orleans Saints (NFL) and the New Orleans Pelicans (NBA). It is also home to the Big Easy Rollergirls, an all-female flat track roller derby team, and the New Orleans Blaze, a women's football team. New Orleans is also home to two NCAA Division I athletic programs, the Tulane Green Wave of the American Athletic Conference and the UNO Privateers of the Southland Conference.

The Caesars Superdome is the home of the Saints, the Sugar Bowl, and other prominent events. It has hosted the Super Bowl a record eight times (1978, 1981, 1986, 1990, 1997, 2002, 2013, and 2025). The Smoothie King Center is the home of the Pelicans, VooDoo, and many events that are not large enough to need the Superdome. New Orleans is also home to the Fair Grounds Race Course, the nation's third-oldest thoroughbred track. The city's Lakefront Arena has also been home to sporting events.

Each year New Orleans plays host to the Sugar Bowl, the New Orleans Bowl, the Bayou Classic, and the Zurich Classic, a golf tournament on the PGA Tour. In addition, it has often hosted major sporting events that have no permanent home, such as the Super Bowl, ArenaBowl, NBA All-Star Game, BCS National Championship Game, and the NCAA Final Four. The Rock 'n' Roll Mardi Gras Marathon and the Crescent City Classic are two annual road running events.

In 2017, Major League Rugby had its inaugural season, and NOLA Gold were one of the first teams in the league. They play at the Gold Mine on Airline, a former minor league baseball stadium in the suburb of Metairie. In 2022, a consortium started an attempt to bring professional soccer to New Orleans, hoping to place teams in the male USL Championship and women's USL Super League by 2025.

== National protected areas ==
- Bayou Sauvage National Wildlife Refuge
- Jean Lafitte National Historical Park and Preserve
- New Orleans Jazz National Historical Park
- Vieux Carre Historic District

== Government ==
United States presidential election results for Orleans Parish, Louisiana
| Year | Republican | | Democratic | | Third party(ies) | |
| Year | No. | % | No. | % | No. | % |
|---|---|---|---|---|---|---|
| 1912 | 904 | 2.74% | 26,433 | 80.03% | 5,692 | 17.23% |
| 1916 | 2,531 | 7.45% | 30,936 | 91.03% | 516 | 1.52% |
| 1920 | 17,819 | 35.26% | 32,724 | 64.74% | 0 | 0.00% |
| 1924 | 7,865 | 16.46% | 37,785 | 79.06% | 2,141 | 4.48% |
| 1928 | 14,424 | 20.51% | 55,919 | 79.49% | 0 | 0.00% |
| 1932 | 5,407 | 5.95% | 85,288 | 93.87% | 165 | 0.18% |
| 1936 | 10,254 | 8.67% | 108,012 | 91.32% | 16 | 0.01% |
| 1940 | 16,406 | 14.35% | 97,930 | 85.63% | 28 | 0.02% |
| 1944 | 20,190 | 18.25% | 90,411 | 81.74% | 7 | 0.01% |
| 1948 | 29,442 | 23.78% | 41,900 | 33.85% | 52,443 | 42.37% |
| 1952 | 85,572 | 48.74% | 89,999 | 51.26% | 0 | 0.00% |
| 1956 | 93,082 | 56.54% | 64,958 | 39.46% | 6,594 | 4.01% |
| 1960 | 47,111 | 26.80% | 87,242 | 49.64% | 41,414 | 23.56% |
| 1964 | 81,049 | 49.69% | 82,045 | 50.31% | 0 | 0.00% |
| 1968 | 47,728 | 26.71% | 72,451 | 40.55% | 58,489 | 32.74% |
| 1972 | 88,075 | 54.55% | 60,790 | 37.65% | 12,581 | 7.79% |
| 1976 | 70,925 | 42.14% | 93,130 | 55.33% | 4,249 | 2.52% |
| 1980 | 74,302 | 39.54% | 106,858 | 56.87% | 6,744 | 3.59% |
| 1984 | 86,316 | 41.71% | 119,478 | 57.73% | 1,162 | 0.56% |
| 1988 | 64,763 | 35.24% | 116,851 | 63.58% | 2,186 | 1.19% |
| 1992 | 52,019 | 26.36% | 133,261 | 67.53% | 12,069 | 6.12% |
| 1996 | 39,576 | 20.84% | 144,720 | 76.20% | 5,615 | 2.96% |
| 2000 | 39,404 | 21.74% | 137,630 | 75.95% | 4,187 | 2.31% |
| 2004 | 42,847 | 21.74% | 152,610 | 77.43% | 1,646 | 0.84% |
| 2008 | 28,130 | 19.08% | 117,102 | 79.42% | 2,207 | 1.50% |
| 2012 | 28,003 | 17.74% | 126,722 | 80.30% | 3,088 | 1.96% |
| 2016 | 24,292 | 14.65% | 133,996 | 80.81% | 7,524 | 4.54% |
| 2020 | 26,664 | 15.00% | 147,854 | 83.15% | 3,301 | 1.86% |
| 2024 | 24,119 | 15.16% | 130,749 | 82.16% | 4,262 | 2.68% |

The city of New Orleans is a political subdivision of the U.S. state of Louisiana. The city and the parish of Orleans operate as a merged city-parish government. The original city was composed of what are now the 1st to 9th wards. In 1836, in response to tensions between the city's old-line Creole population and American newcomers, the state modified New Orleans's charter, dividing the city into three municipalities with local control but still answering to a single mayor and council. In 1852, a new charter was issued, recombining the three municipalities and annexing the city of Lafayette, including the Garden District, which formed the 10th and 11th wards. In 1870, Jefferson City, including Faubourg Bouligny and much of the Audubon and University areas, was annexed as the 12th, 13th, and 14th wards. Algiers, on the west bank of the Mississippi, was also annexed in 1870, becoming the 15th ward.

New Orleans has a mayor-council government, following a home rule charter adopted in 1954, as later amended. The city council consists of seven members, five elected from single-member districts and two members elected at-large, that is, across the city-parish. LaToya Cantrell assumed the mayor's office in 2018 as the first female mayor of the city. An ordinance in 2006 established an Office of Inspector General to review city government activities.

New Orleans's government is largely centralized in the city council and mayor's office, but it maintains earlier systems from when various sections of the city managed their affairs separately. For example, New Orleans had seven elected tax assessors, each with their own staff, representing various districts of the city, rather than one centralized office. A constitutional amendment passed on November 7, 2006, consolidated the seven assessors into one in 2010.

The City of New Orleans, used Archon Information Systems software and services to host multiple online tax sales. The first tax sale was held after Hurricane Katrina. The New Orleans government operates both a fire department and the New Orleans Emergency Medical Services.

New Orleans is the only city in Louisiana that refuses to pay court-ordered judgments when it loses a case that were awarded to the other party. The city uses a provision in the Louisiana Constitution that prohibits the seizure of a city's property to pay a judgment when it loses a lawsuit. According to an article, "The constitution says the funds can't be seized and can only be paid out if the government appropriates the money. In other words, if the City of New Orleans doesn't budget the funds for judgments, no judge can force the city to pay."

Only if the city council chooses to vote to pay a judgment can the other party be paid. Since the city cannot be forced to pay judgments unless it chooses to do so, it simply does not pay. More than $36 million in over 500 unpaid judgments issued against the city are simply ignored, some going as far back as 1996.

The Orleans Parish Civil Sheriff's Office serves papers involving lawsuits, provides court security, and operates the city's correctional facilities, including Orleans Parish Prison. The sheriff's office shares legal jurisdiction with the New Orleans Police Department and provides it with backup on an as-needed basis. Before 2010, New Orleans (and all other parishes in Louisiana) had separate criminal and civil sheriff's offices, corresponding to the separate criminal and civil courts: these were merged in 2010. As of 2024 the sheriff is Susan Hutson, who defeated 17-year incumbent Marlin Gusman in the 2021 New Orleans City Election.

The city government contracts with the Louisiana SPCA for animal control services, and for animal shelter services.

== Crime ==
New Orleans is considered one of the most dangerous cities in the nation. As in comparable U.S. cities, the incidence of homicide and other violent crimes is usually highly concentrated in certain lower income neighborhoods. Arrested offenders in New Orleans are almost exclusively black males from lower income neighborhoods: in 2011, 97% were black and 95% were male; 91% of victims were black as well.

The city's murder rate has been historically high and consistently among the highest rates nationwide since the 1970s. From 1994 to 2013, New Orleans was the country's "Murder Capital", annually averaging over 200 murders. The first record was broken in 1979 when the city reached 242 homicides. The record was broken again reaching 250 by 1989 to 345 by the end of 1991. By 1993, New Orleans had 395 murders: 80.5 for every 100,000 residents.

In 1994, the city was officially named the "Murder Capital of America", hitting a historic peak of 424 murders. The murder count was one of the highest in the world and surpassed that of such cities as Gary, Indiana, Washington, D.C., and Baltimore. In 1999, the city's murder rate dropped down to a low of 158 and climbed to the high 200s in the early 2000s. Between 2000 and 2004, New Orleans had the highest homicide rate per capita of any city in the U.S., with 59 people killed per year per 100,000 citizens.

In 2006, with nearly half the population gone and widespread disruption and dislocation because of deaths and refugee relocations from Hurricane Katrina, the city hit another record of homicides. It was ranked as the most dangerous city in the country. By 2009, there was a 17% decrease in violent crime, a decrease seen in other cities across the country. But the homicide rate remained among the highest in the United States, at between 55 and 64 per 100,000 residents. In 2010, New Orleans's homicide rate dropped to 49.1 per 100,000, but increased again in 2012, to 53.2, the highest rate among cities of 250,000 population or larger.

The violent crime rate is a key issue in every modern mayoral race. In January 2007, several thousand New Orleans residents marched to City Hall for a rally demanding police and city leaders tackle the crime problem. Then-Mayor Ray Nagin said he was "totally and solely focused" on addressing the problem. Later, the city implemented checkpoints during late night hours in problem areas. The murder rate climbed 14% in 2011 to 57.88 per 100,000 rising to No. 21 in the world. In 2016, according to annual crime statistics released by the New Orleans Police Department (NOPD), 176 were murdered.

In 2017, New Orleans had the highest rate of gun violence, surpassing the more populated Chicago and Detroit. In 2020, murders increased 68% from 2019 with a total of 202 murders. Criminal justice observers blamed impacts from COVID-19 and changes in police strategies for the uptick. In 2022, New Orleans's homicide rate skyrocketed, leading every major city, hence the city again being declared as the "Murder Capital of America". The 2022 city homicide count increased to 280 which was a 26-year high. The NOPD dropped to under 1,000 officers in 2022 which meant the department was severely understaffed for the city's population. NOPD is actively working to reduce violent crime by offering attractive incentives to recruit and retain more officers.

By mid-2025 a prolonged focus on addressing its root causes and reforming the local criminal justice system has reduced the incidence of violent crime to its lowest levels since the early 1970s.

== Education ==
=== Colleges and universities ===
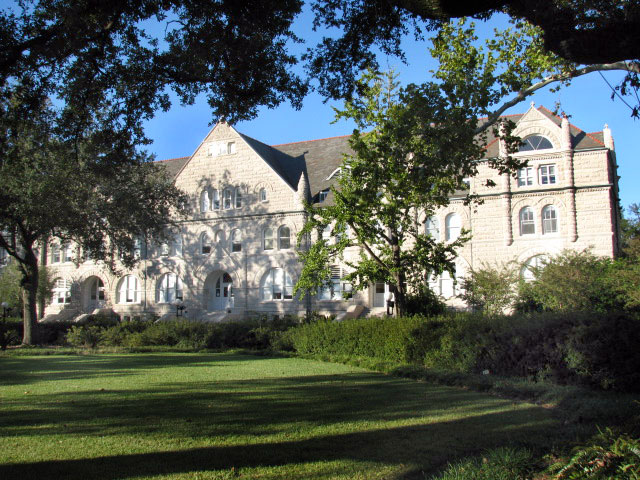
Gibson Hall at Tulane University

New Orleans has the highest concentration of colleges and universities in Louisiana and one of the highest in the Southern United States. New Orleans also has the third highest concentration of historically black collegiate institutions in the U.S.

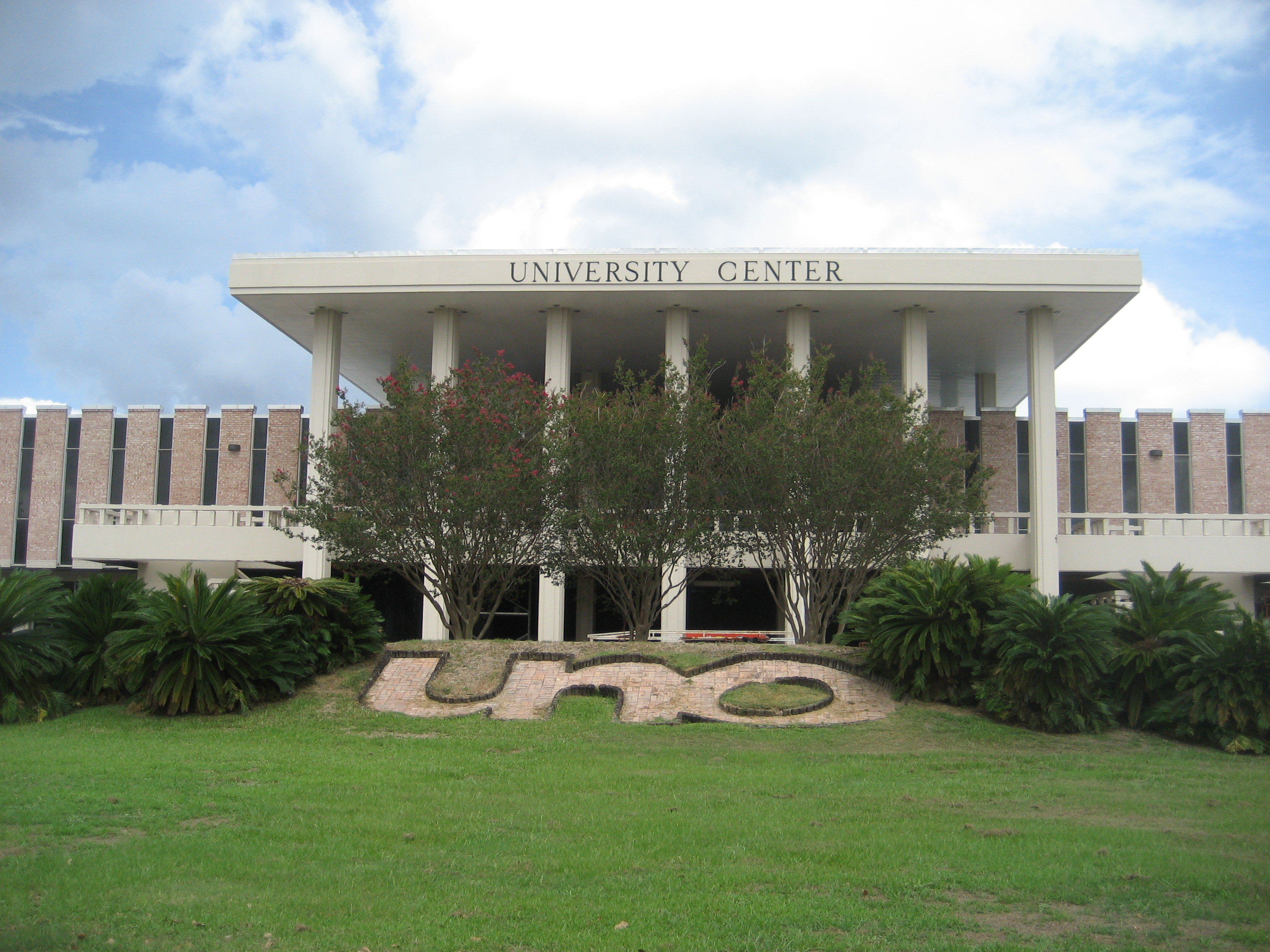
The University of New Orleans

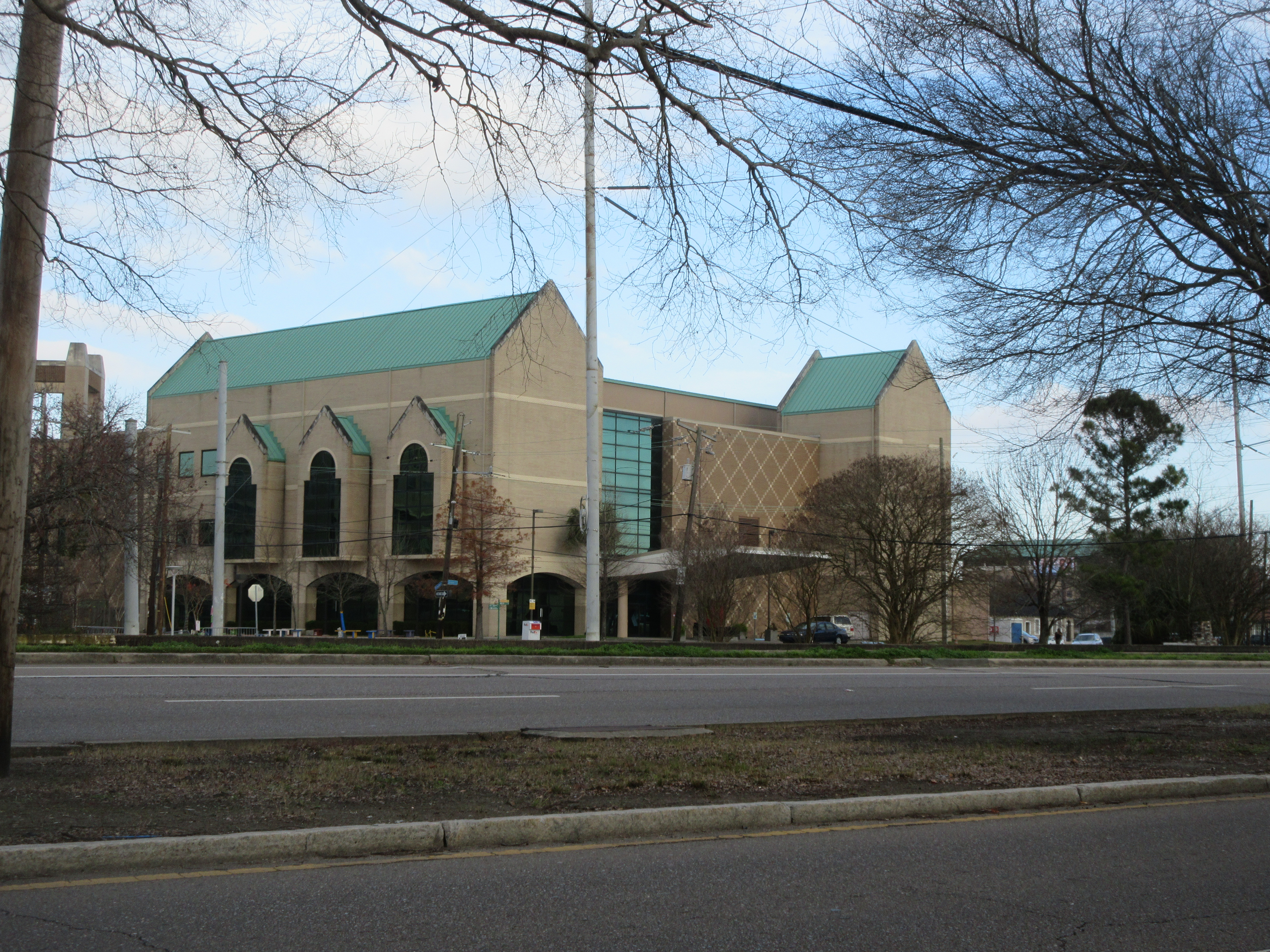
Xavier University of Louisiana

Colleges and universities based within the city include:

- Tulane University
- Loyola University New Orleans
- University of New Orleans
- Xavier University of Louisiana
- Southern University at New Orleans
- Dillard University
- Louisiana State University Health Sciences Center
- University of Holy Cross
- Notre Dame Seminary
- New Orleans Baptist Theological Seminary
- Delgado Community College
- William Carey College School of Nursing

=== Primary and secondary schools ===
Orleans Parish School Board (OPSB), also known as New Orleans Public Schools (NOPS), is the public school district for the entire city. Katrina was a watershed moment for the school system. Pre-Katrina, NOPS was one of the area's largest systems, along with the Jefferson Parish public school system. It was also the lowest-performing school district in Louisiana. According to researchers Carl L. Bankston and Stephen J. Caldas, only 12 of the 103 public schools within the city limits showed reasonably good performance.

Following Hurricane Katrina, the state of Louisiana took over most of the schools within the system, all schools that matched a nominal "worst-performing" metric. Many of these schools, and others, were subsequently granted operating charters, giving them administrative independence from the Orleans Parish School Board, the Recovery School District or the Louisiana Board of Elementary and Secondary Education (BESE). At the start of the 2014 school year, all public school students in the NOPS system attended these independent public charter schools, the nation's first to do so.

The charter schools made significant and sustained gains in student achievement, led by outside operators such as KIPP, the Algiers Charter School Network, and the Capital One–University of New Orleans Charter School Network. An October 2009 assessment demonstrated continued growth in the academic performance of public schools. Considering the scores of all public schools in New Orleans gives an overall school district performance score of 70.6. This score represents a 24% improvement over an equivalent pre-Katrina (2004) metric, when a district score of 56.9 was posted. Notably, this score of 70.6 approaches the score (78.4) posted in 2009 by the adjacent, suburban Jefferson Parish public school system, though that system's performance score is itself below the state average of 91.

One particular change was that parents could choose which school to enroll their children in, rather than attending the school nearest them.

=== Libraries ===
Academic and public libraries as well as archives in New Orleans include Monroe Library at Loyola University, Howard-Tilton Memorial Library at Tulane University, the Law Library of Louisiana, and the Earl K. Long Library at the University of New Orleans.

The New Orleans Public Library operates in 13 locations. The main library includes a Louisiana Division that houses city archives and special collections.

Other research archives are located at the Historic New Orleans Collection and the Old U.S. Mint.

An independently operated lending library called Iron Rail Book Collective specializes in radical and hard-to-find books. The library contains over 8,000 titles and is open to the public.

The Louisiana Historical Association was founded in New Orleans in 1889. It operated first at Howard Memorial Library. A separate Memorial Hall for it was later added to Howard Library, designed by New Orleans architect Thomas Sully.

== Media ==
Historically, the major newspaper in the area was The Times-Picayune. In 2012, the owner Advance Publications cut its print schedule to three days each week, instead focusing its efforts on its website, NOLA.com. That action briefly made New Orleans the largest city in the country without a daily newspaper, until the Baton Rouge newspaper The Advocate began a New Orleans edition in September 2012.

In June 2013, the Times-Picayune resumed daily printing with a condensed newsstand tabloid edition, nicknamed TP Street, which is published on the three days each week that its namesake broadsheet edition is not printed. The Picayune has not returned to daily delivery. With the resumption of daily print editions from the Times-Picayune and the launch of the New Orleans edition of The Advocate, now The New Orleans Advocate, the city had two daily newspapers for the first time since the afternoon States-Item ceased publication in May 1980. In 2019, the papers merged to form The Times-Picayune/The New Orleans Advocate.

In addition to the daily newspaper, weekly publications include The Louisiana Weekly and Gambit Weekly. Also in wide circulation is the Clarion Herald, the newspaper of the Roman Catholic Archdiocese of New Orleans.

Greater New Orleans is the 54th largest designated market area (DMA) in the U.S., serving at least 566,960 homes. Major television network affiliates serving the area include:

- 4 WWL (CBS)
- 6 WDSU (NBC)
- 8 WVUE (Fox)
- 12 WYES (PBS)
- 20 WHNO (LeSEA)
- 26 WGNO (ABC)
- 32 WLAE (Independent)
- 38 WNOL (The CW)
- 42 KGLA (Telemundo)
- 49 WPXL (Ion)
- 54 WUPL (MyNetworkTV)

WWOZ, the New Orleans Jazz and Heritage Station, broadcasts modern and traditional jazz, blues, rhythm and blues, brass band, gospel, cajun, zydeco, Caribbean, Latin, Brazilian, African and bluegrass 24 hours per day.

WTUL is Tulane University's radio station. Its programming includes 20th century classical, reggae, jazz, showtunes, indie rock, electronic music, soul/funk, goth, punk, hip-hop, New Orleans music, opera, folk, hardcore, Americana, country, blues, Latin, cheese, techno, local, world, ska, swing and big band, kids' shows, and news programming. WTUL is listener-supported and non-commercial. The disc jockeys are volunteers, many of them college students.

Louisiana's film and television tax credits spurred growth in the television industry, although to a lesser degree than in the film industry. Many films and advertisements were set there, along with television programs such as The Real World: New Orleans in 2000, The Real World: Back to New Orleans in 2009 and 2010, and Bad Girls Club: New Orleans in 2011.

Two radio stations that were influential in promoting New Orleans–based bands and singers were 50,000-watt WNOE (1060) and 10,000-watt WTIX (690 AM). These two stations competed head-to-head from the late 1950s to the late 1970s.

== Transportation ==
=== Public transportation ===
Hurricane Katrina devastated transit service in 2005. The New Orleans Regional Transit Authority (RTA) was quicker to restore the streetcars to service, while bus service had only been restored to 35% of pre-Katrina levels as recently as the end of 2013. During the same period, streetcars arrived at an average of once every seventeen minutes, compared to bus frequencies of once every thirty-eight minutes. The same priority was demonstrated in RTA's spending, increasing the proportion of its budget devoted to streetcars to more than three times compared to its pre-Katrina budget. Through the end of 2017, counting both streetcar and bus trips, only 51% of service had been restored to pre-Katrina levels.

In 2017, the New Orleans Regional Transit Authority began operation on the extension of the Rampart–St. Claude streetcar line. Another change to transit service that year was the re-routing of the 15 Freret and 28 Martin Luther King bus routes to Canal Street. These increased the number of jobs accessible by a thirty-minute walk or transit ride: from 83,722 in 2016 to 89,216 in 2017. This resulted in a regional increase in such job access by more than a full percentage point.

==== Streetcars ====
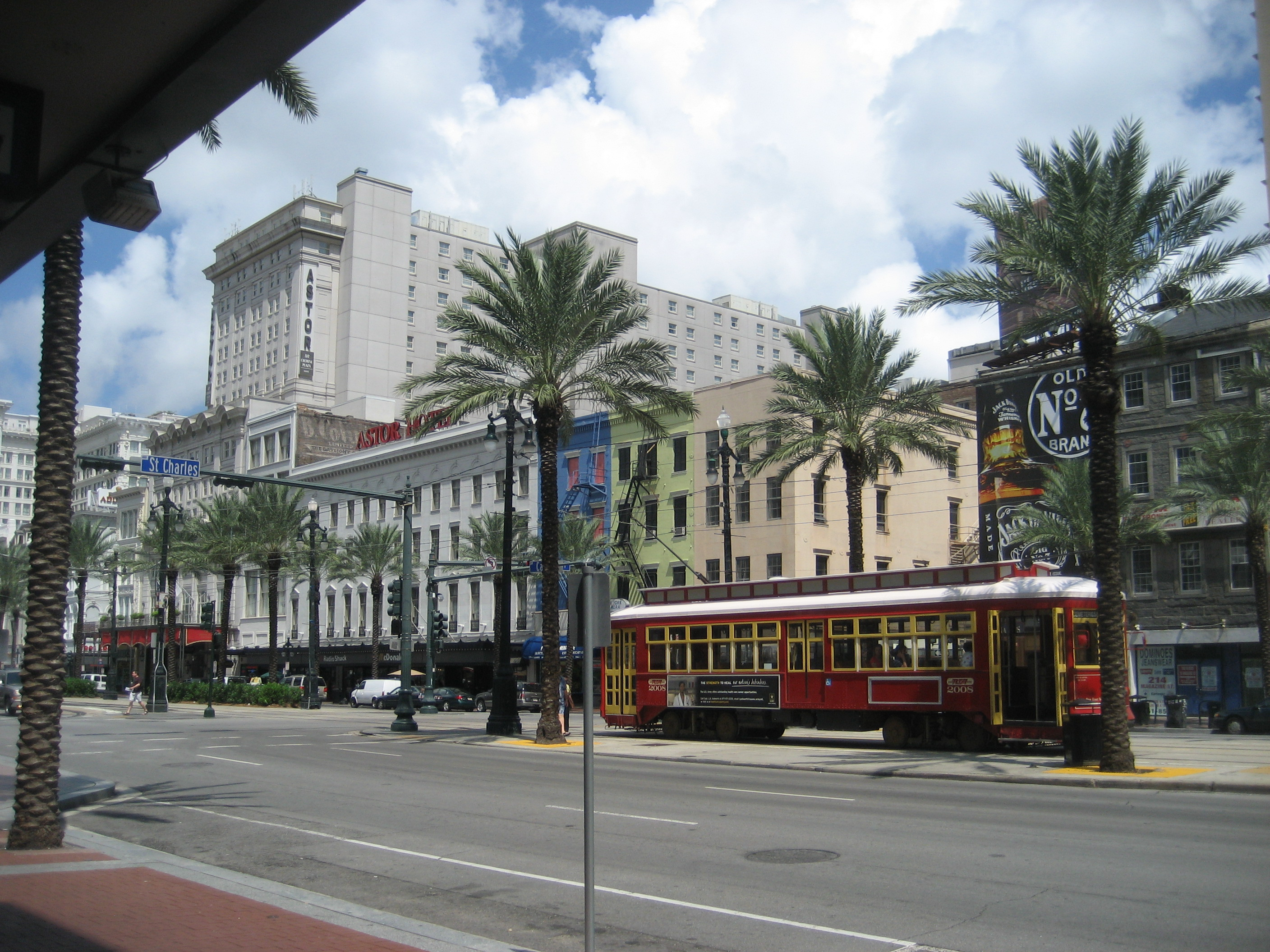
A New Orleans streetcar traveling down Canal Street

A map of the streetcar network

New Orleans has four active streetcar lines:

- The St. Charles Streetcar Line is the oldest continuously operating streetcar line in the U.S. The line first operated as local rail service in 1835 between Carrollton and downtown New Orleans. Operated by the Carrollton & New Orleans R.R. Co., the locomotives were then powered by steam engines, and a one-way fare cost 25 cents. Each car is a historic landmark. It runs from Canal Street to the other end of St. Charles Avenue, then turns right into South Carrollton Avenue to its terminal at Carrollton and Claiborne.
- The Riverfront Streetcar Line runs parallel to the river from Esplanade Street through the French Quarter to Canal Street to the Convention Center above Julia Street in the Arts District.
- The Canal Streetcar Line uses the Riverfront line tracks from the intersection of Canal Street and Poydras Street, down Canal Street, then branches off and ends at the cemeteries at City Park Avenue, with a spur running from the intersection of Canal and Carrollton Avenue to the entrance of City Park at Esplanade, near the entrance to the New Orleans Museum of Art.
- The Rampart–Loyola Streetcar Line opened on January 28, 2013, as the Loyola-UPT Streetcar Line running along Loyola Avenue from New Orleans Union Passenger Terminal to Canal Street, then continuing along Canal Street to the river, and on weekends on the Riverfront line tracks to French Market. The French Quarter Rail Expansion extended the line from the Loyola Avenue/Canal Street intersection along Rampart Street and St. Claude Avenue to Elysian Fields Avenue. It no longer runs along Canal Street to the river, or on weekends on the Riverfront line tracks to French Market.

The city's streetcars were featured in the Tennessee Williams play A Streetcar Named Desire. The streetcar line to Desire Street became a bus line in 1948.

==== Buses ====
Public transportation is operated by the New Orleans Regional Transit Authority ("RTA"). Many bus routes connect the city and suburban areas. The RTA lost 200+ buses in the flood. Some of the replacement buses operate on biodiesel. The Jefferson Parish Department of Transit Administration operates Jefferson Transit, which provides service between the city and its suburbs.

==== Ferries ====
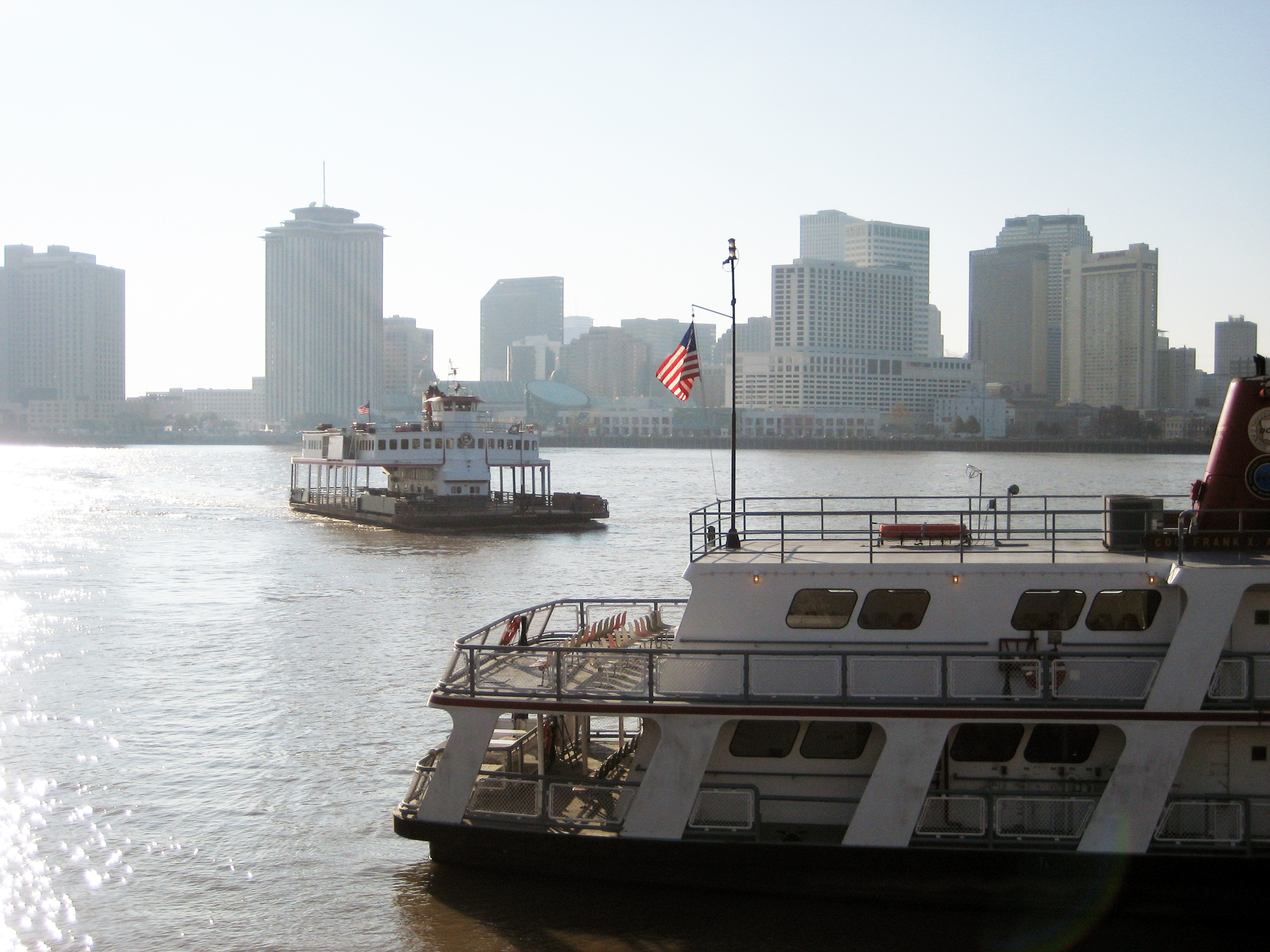
Ferries connecting New Orleans with Algiers (left) and Gretna (right)

New Orleans has had continuous ferry service since 1827, operating three routes as of 2017. The Canal Street Ferry (or Algiers Ferry) connects downtown New Orleans at the foot of Canal Street with the National Historic Landmark District of Algiers Point across the Mississippi ("West Bank" in local parlance). It services passenger vehicles, bicycles and pedestrians. This same terminal also serves the Canal Street/Gretna Ferry, connecting Gretna, Louisiana for pedestrians and bicyclists only. A third auto/bicycle/pedestrian connects Chalmette, Louisiana and Lower Algiers.

=== Bicycling ===
The city's flat landscape, simple street grid and mild winters facilitate bicycle ridership, helping to make New Orleans eighth among U.S. cities in its rate of bicycle and pedestrian transportation as of 2010, and sixth in terms of the percentage of bicycling commuters. New Orleans is located at the start of the Mississippi River Trail, a 3,000-mile (4,800 km) bicycle path that stretches from the city's Audubon Park to Minnesota.

Since Katrina, the city has actively sought to promote bicycling by constructing a $1.5 million bike trail from Mid-City to Lake Pontchartrain, and by adding over 37 miles (60 km) of bicycle lanes to streets, including St. Charles Avenue. In 2009, Tulane University contributed to these efforts by converting the main street through its Uptown campus, McAlister Place, into a pedestrian mall open to bicycle traffic. The Lafitte Greenway bicycle and pedestrian trail opened in 2015, and is ultimately planned to extend 3.1-mile (5.0 km) from the French Quarter to Lakeview. New Orleans has been recognized for its abundance of uniquely decorated and uniquely designed bicycles.

=== Roads ===
New Orleans is served by Interstate 10, Interstate 610 and Interstate 510. I-10 travels east–west through the city as the Pontchartrain Expressway. In New Orleans East it is known as the Eastern Expressway. I-610 provides a direct shortcut for traffic passing through New Orleans via I-10, allowing that traffic to bypass I-10's southward curve.

In addition to the interstates, U.S. 90 travels through the city, while U.S. 61 terminates downtown. In addition, U.S. 11 terminates in the eastern portion of the city.

New Orleans is home to many bridges; Crescent City Connection is perhaps the most notable. It serves as New Orleans's major bridge across the Mississippi, providing a connection between the city's downtown on the eastbank and its westbank suburbs. Other Mississippi crossings are the Huey P. Long Bridge, carrying U.S. 90 and the Hale Boggs Memorial Bridge, carrying Interstate 310.

The Twin Span Bridge, a five-mile (8 km) causeway in eastern New Orleans, carries I-10 across Lake Pontchartrain. Also in eastern New Orleans, Interstate 510/LA 47 travels across the Intracoastal Waterway/Mississippi River-Gulf Outlet Canal via the Paris Road Bridge, connecting New Orleans East and suburban Chalmette.

The tolled Lake Pontchartrain Causeway, consisting of two parallel bridges are, at 24 miles (39 km) long, the longest bridges in the world. Built in the 1950s (southbound span) and 1960s (northbound span), the bridges connect New Orleans with its suburbs on the north shore of Lake Pontchartrain via Metairie.

=== Taxi service ===
United Cab is the city's largest taxi service, with a fleet of over 300 cabs. It has operated 365 days a year since its establishment in 1938, with the exception of the month after Hurricane Katrina, in which operations were temporarily shut down due to disruptions in radio service.

United Cab's fleet was once larger than 450 cabs, but has been reduced in recent years due to competition from services like Uber and Lyft, according to owner Syed Kazmi. In January 2016, New Orleans-based sweet shop Sucré approached United Cab with to deliver its king cakes locally on-demand. Sucré saw this partnership as a way to alleviate some of the financial pressure being placed on taxi services due to Uber's presence in the city.

=== Airports ===
The metropolitan area is served by the Louis Armstrong New Orleans International Airport, located in the suburb of Kenner. Regional airports include the Lakefront Airport, Naval Air Station Joint Reserve Base New Orleans (Callender Field) in the suburb of Belle Chasse and Southern Seaplane Airport, also located in Belle Chasse. Southern Seaplane has a 3,200-foot (980 m) runway for wheeled planes and a 5,000-foot (1,500 m) water runway for seaplanes.

Armstrong International is the busiest airport in Louisiana and the only to handle scheduled international passenger flights. As of 2018, more than 13 million passengers passed through Armstrong, on nonstops flights from more than 57 destinations, including foreign nonstops from the United Kingdom, Germany, Canada, Mexico, Jamaica and the Dominican Republic.

=== Rail ===
The city is served by Amtrak. The New Orleans Union Passenger Terminal is the central rail depot and is served by the Crescent, operating between New Orleans and New York City; the City of New Orleans, operating between New Orleans and Chicago and the Sunset Limited, operating between New Orleans and Los Angeles. Up until August 2005 (when Hurricane Katrina struck), the Sunset Limited's route continued east to Orlando. The Mardi Gras Service provides service to Mobile following that route.

With the strategic benefits of both the port and its double-track Mississippi River crossings, the city attracted all six of the Class I railroads in North America: Union Pacific Railroad, BNSF Railway, Norfolk Southern Railway, Canadian Pacific Kansas City, CSX Transportation and Canadian National Railway. The New Orleans Public Belt Railroad provides interchange services between the railroads.

=== Modal characteristics ===
According to the 2016 American Community Survey, 67.4% of working city of New Orleans residents commuted by driving alone, 9.7% carpooled, 7.3% used public transportation, and 4.9% walked. About 5% used all other forms of transportation, including taxicab, motorcycle, and bicycle. About 5.7% of working New Orleans residents worked at home.

Many city of New Orleans households own no personal automobiles. In 2015, 18.8% of New Orleans households were without a car, which increased to 20.2% in 2016. The national average was 8.7 percent in 2016. New Orleans averaged 1.26 cars per household in 2016, compared to a national average of 1.8 per household.

New Orleans ranks high among cities in terms of the percentage of working residents who commute by walking or bicycling. In 2013, 5% of working people from New Orleans commuted by walking and 2.8% commuted by cycling. During the same period, New Orleans ranked thirteenth for percentage of workers who commuted by walking or biking among cities not included within the fifty most populous cities. Only nine of the most fifty most populous cities had a higher percentage of commuters who walked or biked than did New Orleans in 2013.

== Sister cities ==
Sister cities of New Orleans are:

- Cap-Haïtien, Haiti
- Caracas, Venezuela
- Durban, South Africa
- Innsbruck, Austria
- Isola del Liri, Italy
- Juan-les-Pins (Antibes), France
- Maracaibo, Venezuela
- Matsue, Japan
- Mérida, Mexico
- Orléans, France
- Pointe-Noire, Republic of the Congo
- San Miguel de Tucumán, Argentina
- Tainan, Taiwan
- Tegucigalpa, Honduras

== See also ==
- Buildings and architecture of New Orleans
- Cancer Alley
- The Cabildo
- French Quarter Festival
- Île d'Orléans, Louisiana
- List of people from New Orleans
- Mississippi (River) Suite, with an orchestral portrayal of Mardi Gras
- National Register of Historic Places listings in Orleans Parish, Louisiana
- Neighborhoods in New Orleans
- New Orleans in fiction
- New Orleans Suite, Duke Ellington recording
- New Orleans Union Passenger Terminal
- New Orleans Public Schools
- Pontalba Buildings
- The Presbytere
- Southern Food and Beverage Museum
- USS New Orleans, 5 ships
- USS Orleans Parish
