= Jackson Square (New Orleans) =

- U.S. National Register of Historic Places
- U.S. National Historic Landmark
- U.S. National Historic Landmark District – Contributing property
- Jackson Square in 2019, with Andrew Jackson's statue to the right and Saint Louis Cathedral at center.

- Location within East New Orleans Location within Louisiana Location within the United States
- Location: Bounded by Decatur, St. Peter, St. Ann, and Chartres Sts., New Orleans, Louisiana
- Coordinates: 29°57′27″N 90°03′47″W
- Area: 2.5 acres (1.0 ha)
- Built: 1721
- Part of: Vieux Carre Historic District (ID66000377)
- NRHP reference No.: 66000375

Significant dates
- Added to NRHP: October 15, 1966
- Designated NHL: October 9, 1960
- Designated NHLDCP: December 21, 1965

Jackson Square, formerly the Place d'Armes (French) or Plaza de Armas (Spanish), is a historic park in the French Quarter of New Orleans, Louisiana. It was declared a National Historic Landmark in 1960, for its central role in the city's history, and as the site where in 1803 Louisiana was made United States territory pursuant to the Louisiana Purchase. In 2012 the American Planning Association designated Jackson Square as one of the Great Public Spaces in the United States.

The square is named for Andrew Jackson, who was credited with victory in the 1815 Battle of New Orleans and later became the 7th president of the United States.

== Design and development ==
Jackson Square was designed by the architect and landscape architect Louis H. Pilié. Jackson Square is roughly the size of a city block (GPS +29.9575 -90.0630).

Sculptor Clark Mills' equestrian statue of Andrew Jackson (a recasting of the Washington, D.C., statue), hero of the Battle of New Orleans and seventh U.S. president for whom the former military parade ground was named, was erected in 1856. Iron fences, walkways, benches, and Parisian-style landscaping remain intact from the original design by Micaela Almonester, Baroness de Pontalba, in 1851. She also built the Pontalba Buildings, which flank the old square.

The flagpole, symbolizing the 1803 ceremonial transfers from Spain to France and then from France to the United States, reflects Louisiana's rich colonial history. During the 1930s, the Works Progress Administration (WPA) repainted façades, renovated buildings, and improved landscaping in and around the park. In 1971, the pedestrian zone in the vicinity of Jackson Square was created, when three surrounding streets were closed to vehicular traffic—Chartres, St. Peter, and St. Ann.

== History ==
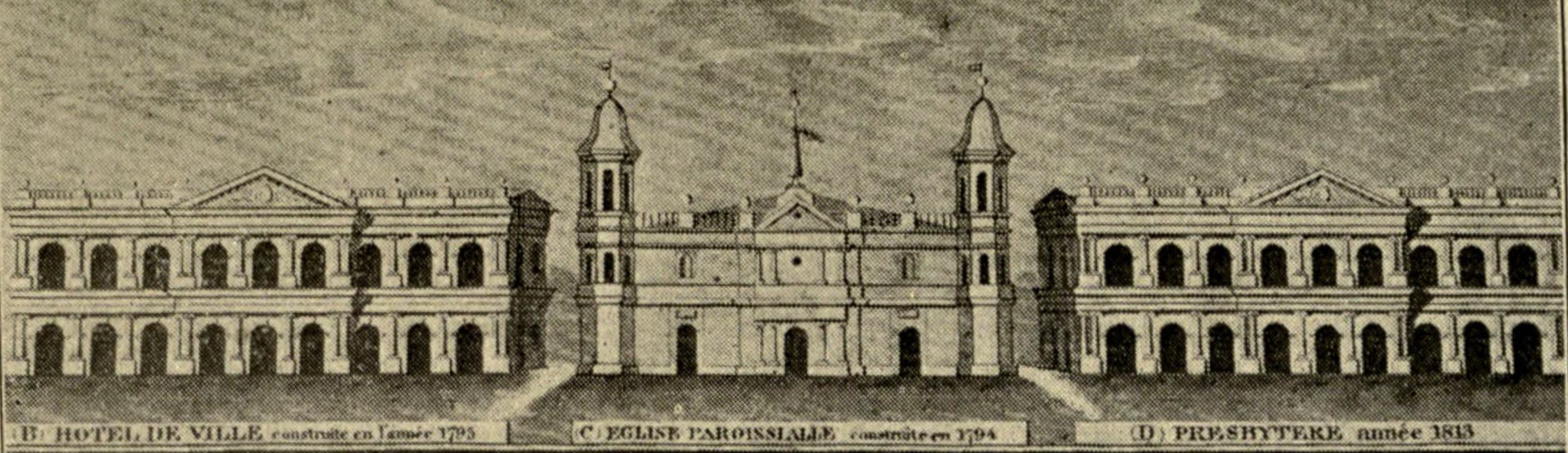
Place des Armes, 1815

Chartres Street side of the square, 1842, before the cathedral's remodeling and before the Pontalba Buildings.

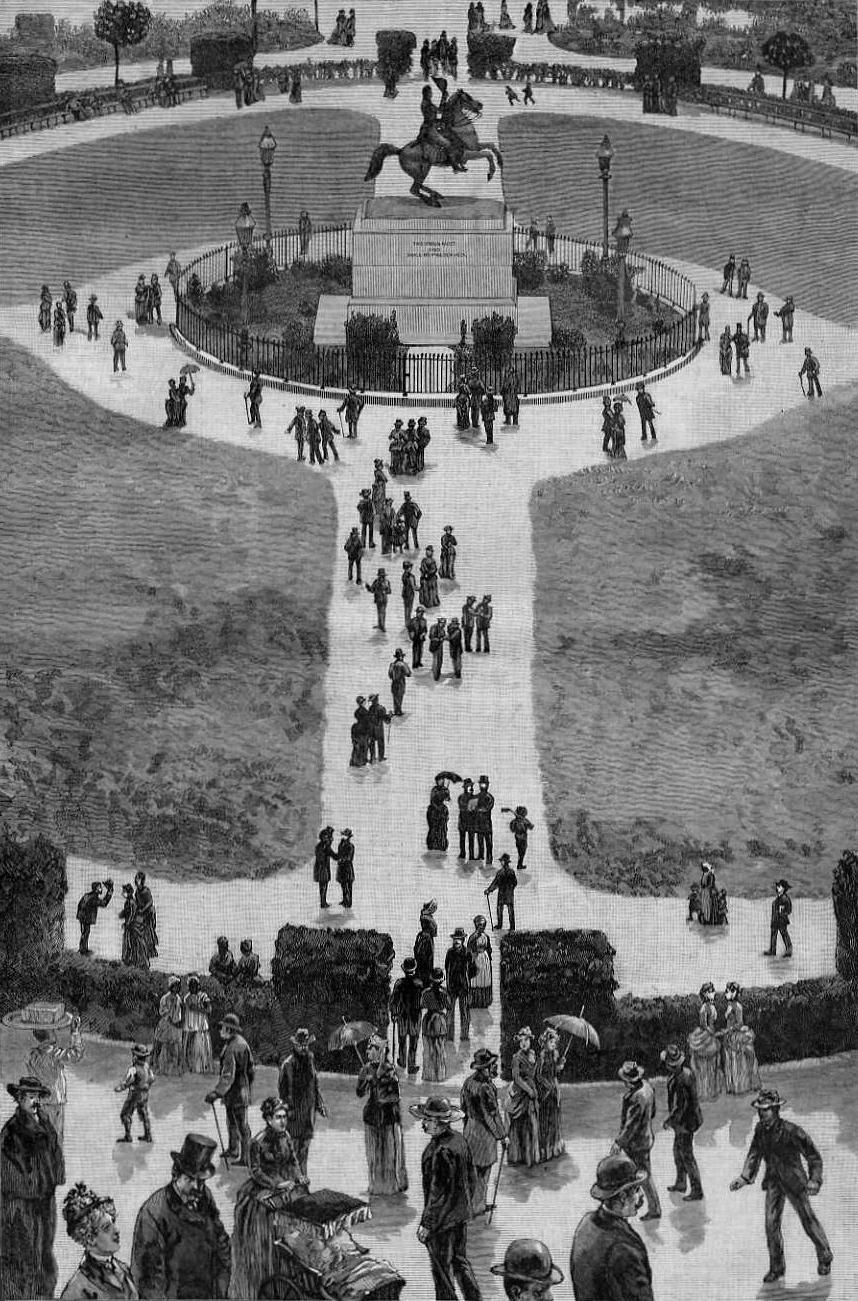
Jackson Square, 1885

Early French colonial New Orleans was centered on what was then called the Place d'Armes (lit. 'weapons’ square'). Under Spanish colonial administration in the second half of the 18th century, the name was Plaza de Armas, which also means a place d'armes. Following the Great New Orleans Fire of 1788, the Spanish officials rebuilt the St. Louis Church (elevated to cathedral in 1793) in 1789 and the town hall (known as the Cabildo) in 1795.

In honor of the 1815 Battle of New Orleans, the former military plaza was renamed Jackson Square, for the battle's victorious General Andrew Jackson, in 1851. In the center of the park stands an equestrian statue of Andrew Jackson erected in 1856, one of four identical statues in the U.S. by the sculptor Clark Mills. The statue was dedicated in a grand ceremony on Saturday, February 9, 1856. The square also has four slightly older statues, neoclassical representations of personifications of the four seasons, one near each corner of the square.

The square originally overlooked the Mississippi River across Decatur Street, but the view was blocked in the 19th century by the construction of higher levees. The riverfront was long devoted to shipping docks. The 20th-century administration of Mayor Moon Landrieu installed a scenic boardwalk on top of the levee to reconnect the city to the river; it is known as the "Moon Walk" in his honor, and has since been expanded and paved. The space between Decatur Street and the "Moon Walk" is designated as "Washington Artillery Park".

On the north side of the square are three 18th-century historic buildings, which were the city's heart in the colonial era. The center of the three is St. Louis Cathedral. The cathedral was designated as a minor basilica by Pope Paul VI. To its left is the Cabildo, the old city hall, now a museum, where the final version of the Louisiana Purchase was signed. To the cathedral's right is the Presbytère, built to match the Cabildo. The Presbytère was initially planned for housing the city's Roman Catholic priests and other church officials. At the start of the 19th century, it was adapted as a courthouse, and in the 20th century it became a museum.

The Place d'Armes was the site for public execution of criminals and rebellious slaves during the 18th and early 19th centuries. After the 1811 German Coast Uprising, three slaves were hanged here. The heads of some of the executed rebels were put on the city's gates. (The same thing happened in St. Charles Parish, and a third slave-trial tribunal was held in St. John the Baptist Parish.)

In the Reconstruction Era, Jackson Square served as an arsenal. During the insurrection following the disputed 1872 gubernatorial election, in March 1873, it was the site of the Battle of Jackson Square. A several-thousand-man militia under John McEnery, the Democratic claimant to the office of the Governor, defeated the New Orleans militia, seizing control of the state's buildings and armory for a few days. They retreated before the arrival of Federal forces, which temporarily re-established order.

== Artists, musicians, and New Age ==
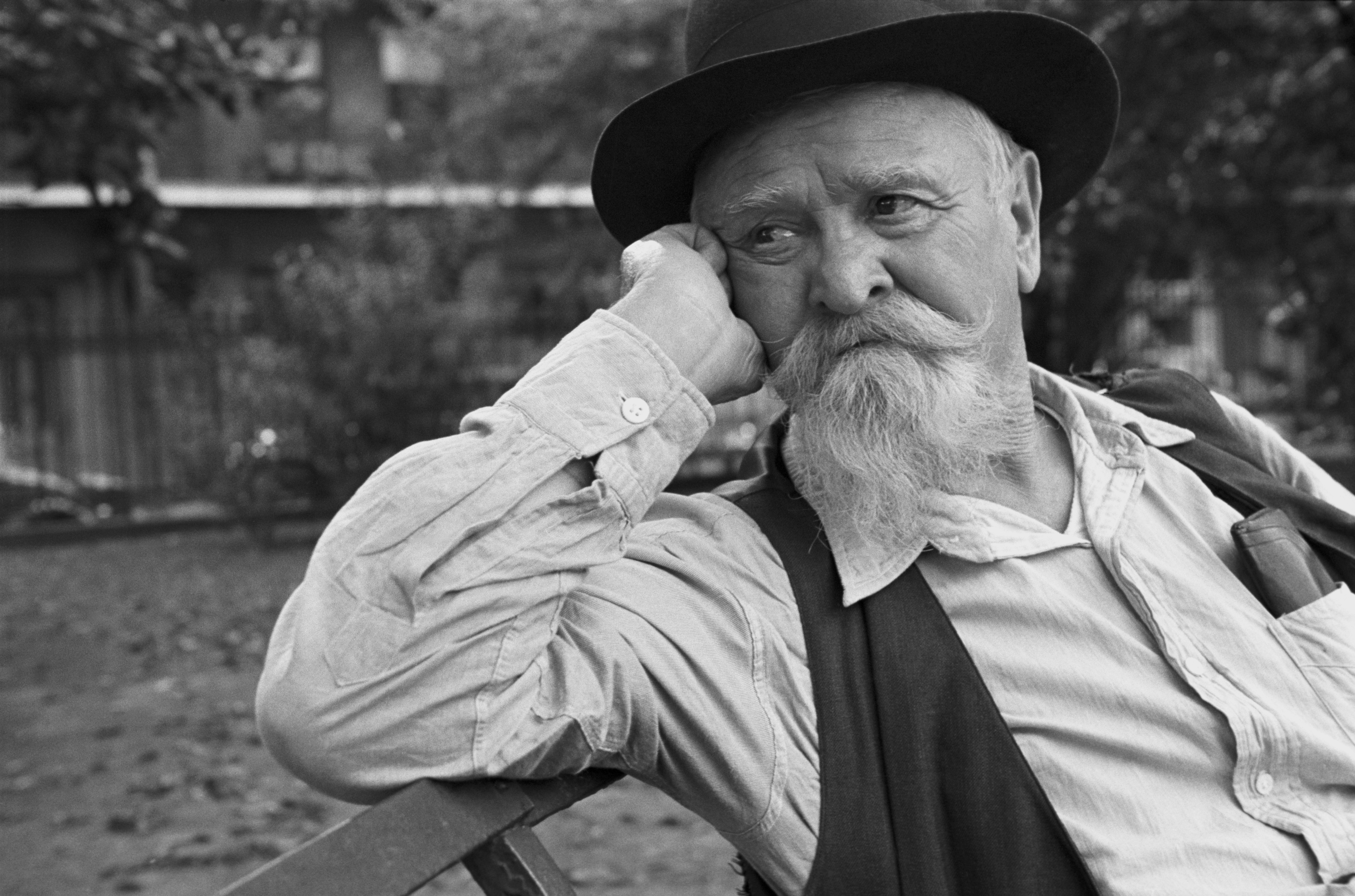
Portrait photograph of a local resident, taken in Jackson Square by Ben Shahn in 1935.

From the 1920s through the 1980s the square was famous as a gathering place of painters of widely varying talents, including proficient professionals, talented young art students, amateurs, and caricaturists. Some of the long-time painters of the 1960's and 1970's included Alberta Kinsey, Rolland Golden, Margret De Loo, Pete De Loo, Jamie Mitchell and Lee Tucker.

The 1960s and 1970s saw the beginnings of the square as a place of business for New Age and pagan devotees telling fortunes and reading palms and tarot cards. They sit on St. Ann or St. Peter street, alongside of the park.

The section of Chartres St. which comprises the parvis of Saint Louis Cathedral, the Presbytère, and the Cabildo is shared by visitors and artists, musicians, and varied street performers, such as jugglers and magicians. The performers generally work for tips.

== Points of interest and events ==
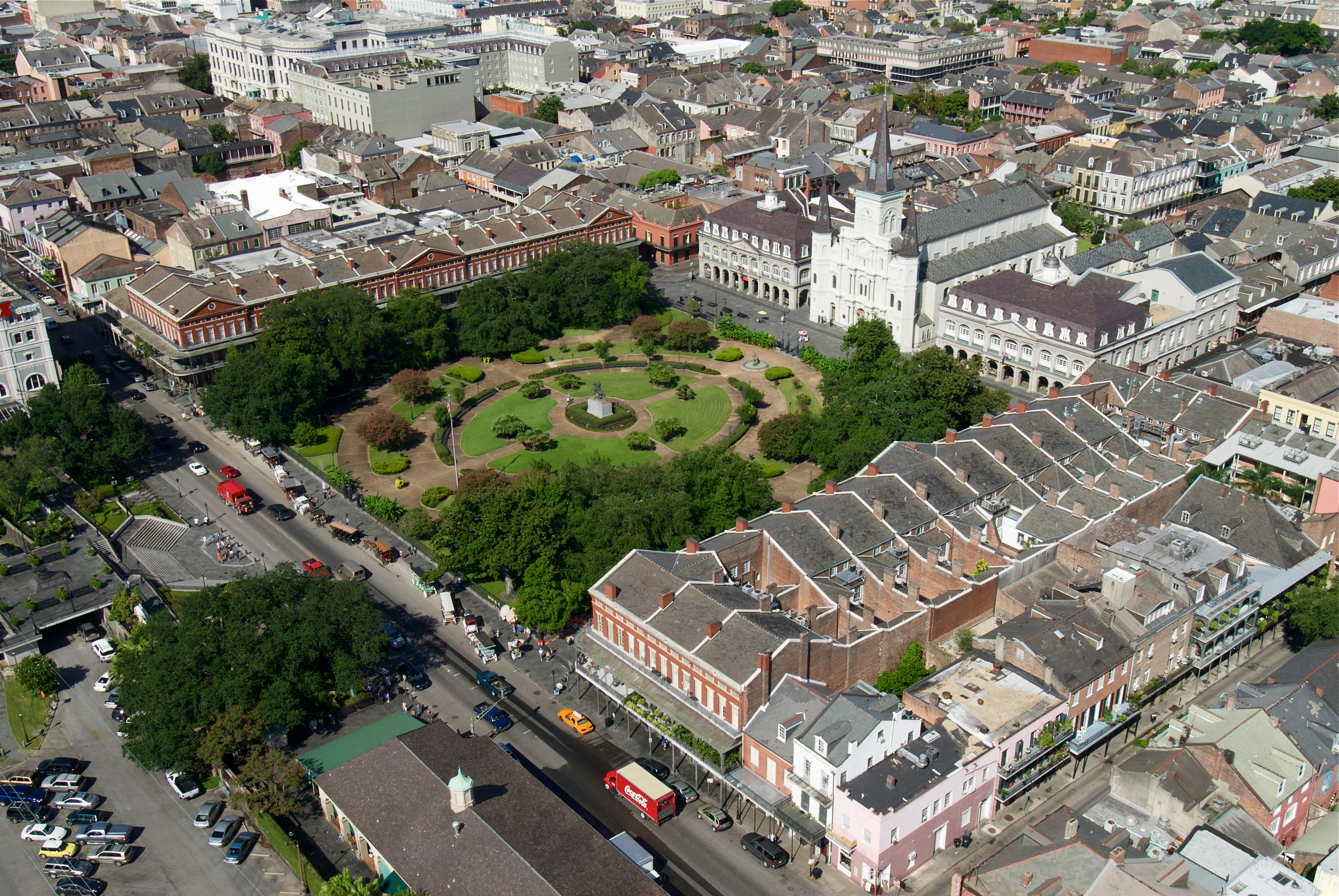
Aerial photograph of Jackson Square

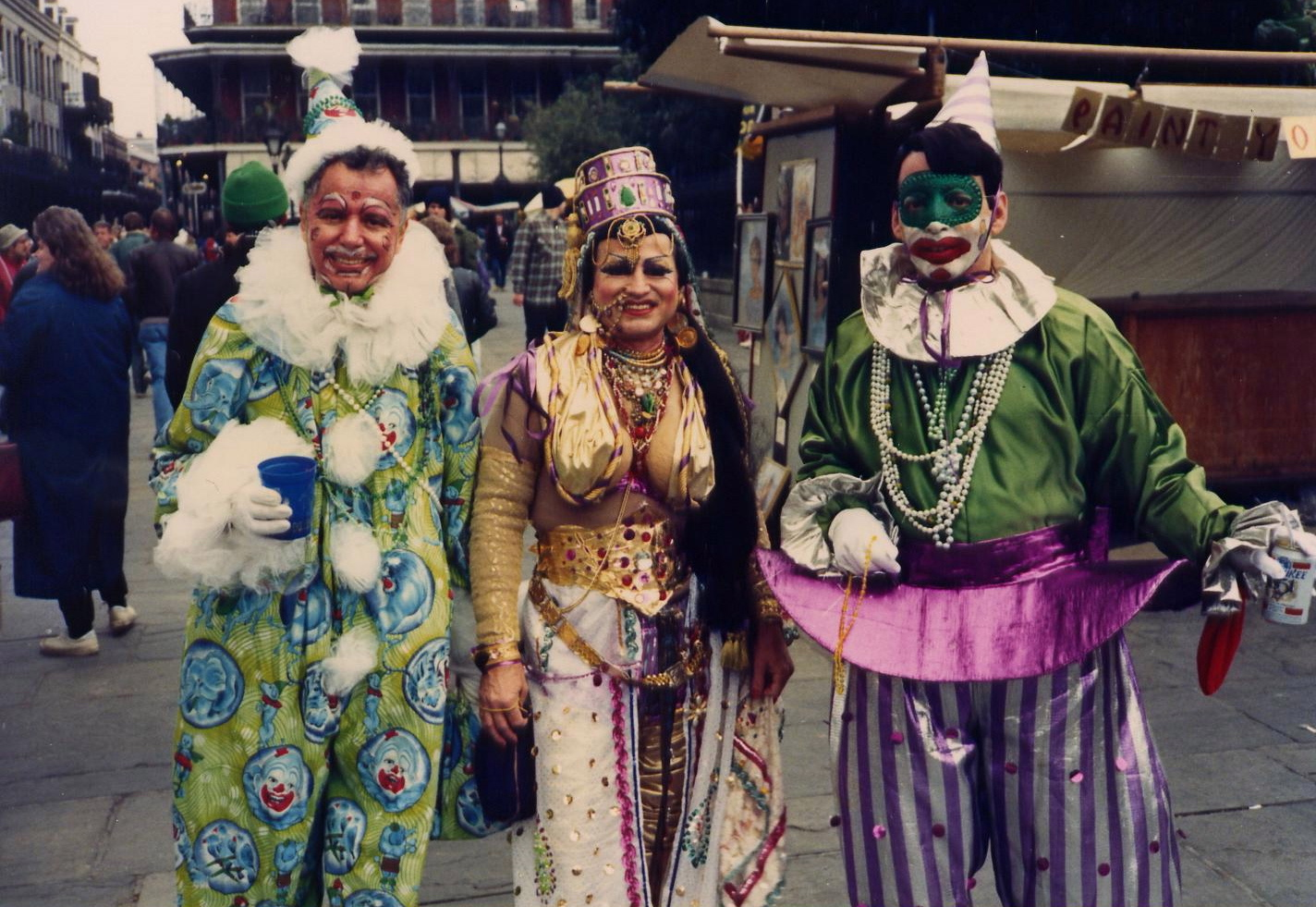
Mardi Gras revelers in Jackson Square, 1989

On the other two sides of the square are the Pontalba Buildings, matching red-brick, block-long, four‑story buildings built in the 1840s. The ground floors house shops and restaurants; the upper floors are apartments, the oldest continuously rented apartments in North America.

Diagonally across Decatur Street upriver from Jackson Square is the Jax Brewery building, the original home of a favorite local beer. After the company ceased to operate independently, the building was converted into several businesses, including restaurants and specialty shops. In recent years, some retail space has been converted into luxury condominiums.

Diagonally across Decatur Street downriver from the square is Café du Monde, open 24 hours a day. Part of the historic French Market, it is known for its café au lait, prepared with chicory, and for its beignets, served there continuously since the Civil War days.

Jackson Square has been the site of hundreds of live music events.

Every year, the square hosts the French Quarter Festival and Caroling in Jackson Square. Occasionally, formal concerts are given in the park.

== Representation in media ==
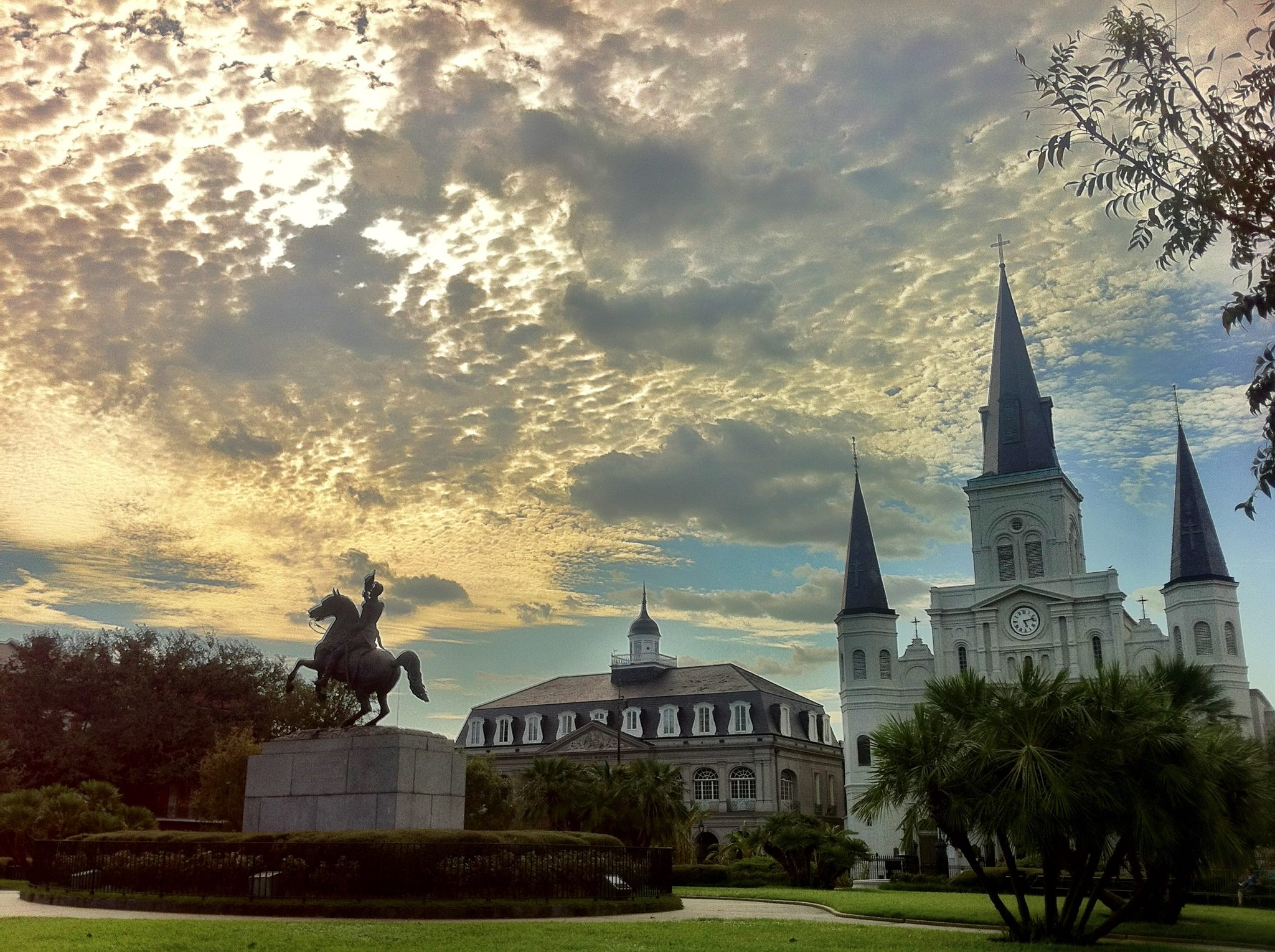
The square in 2012

Jackson Square has been filmed in numerous television shows and movies. Among these are the films Angel Heart, The Curious Case of Benjamin Button, King Creole, and television series K-Ville, Treme, Memphis Beat and The Originals.

It is the setting of an early scene in the graphic novel Polly and the Pirates by Ted Naifeh. In the Star Trek: Deep Space Nine episode "Image in the Sand", Joseph Sisko (Brock Peters) reveals that he met his first wife Sarah (Deborah Lacey) in Jackson Square. Jackson Square is one of the most important locations that can be visited in the computer game Gabriel Knight: Sins of the Fathers. The park is a crucial site, with much of the game's action focusing on it and a number of characters making their appearance there.

In the 2017 novel Poisoned Tears, by Honduran author J. H. Bográn, one of the victims of the novel's serial killer is found in Jackson Square.

On Dick Clark's New Year's Rockin' Eve '17 with Ryan Seacrest, Jackson Square rings in the new year for the first time during the broadcast with the Fleur-de-lis drop at midnight Central Time (1:00 a.m. ET in New York's Times Square).

A scene in Interview with the Vampire TV show's 3rd episode was filmed at Jackson Square.

== See also ==
- List of National Historic Landmarks in Louisiana
- National Register of Historic Places listings in Orleans Parish, Louisiana
