= Café du Monde =

Café in New Orleans, Louisiana

Coordinates: 29.957515°N 90.061823°W

Café Du Monde

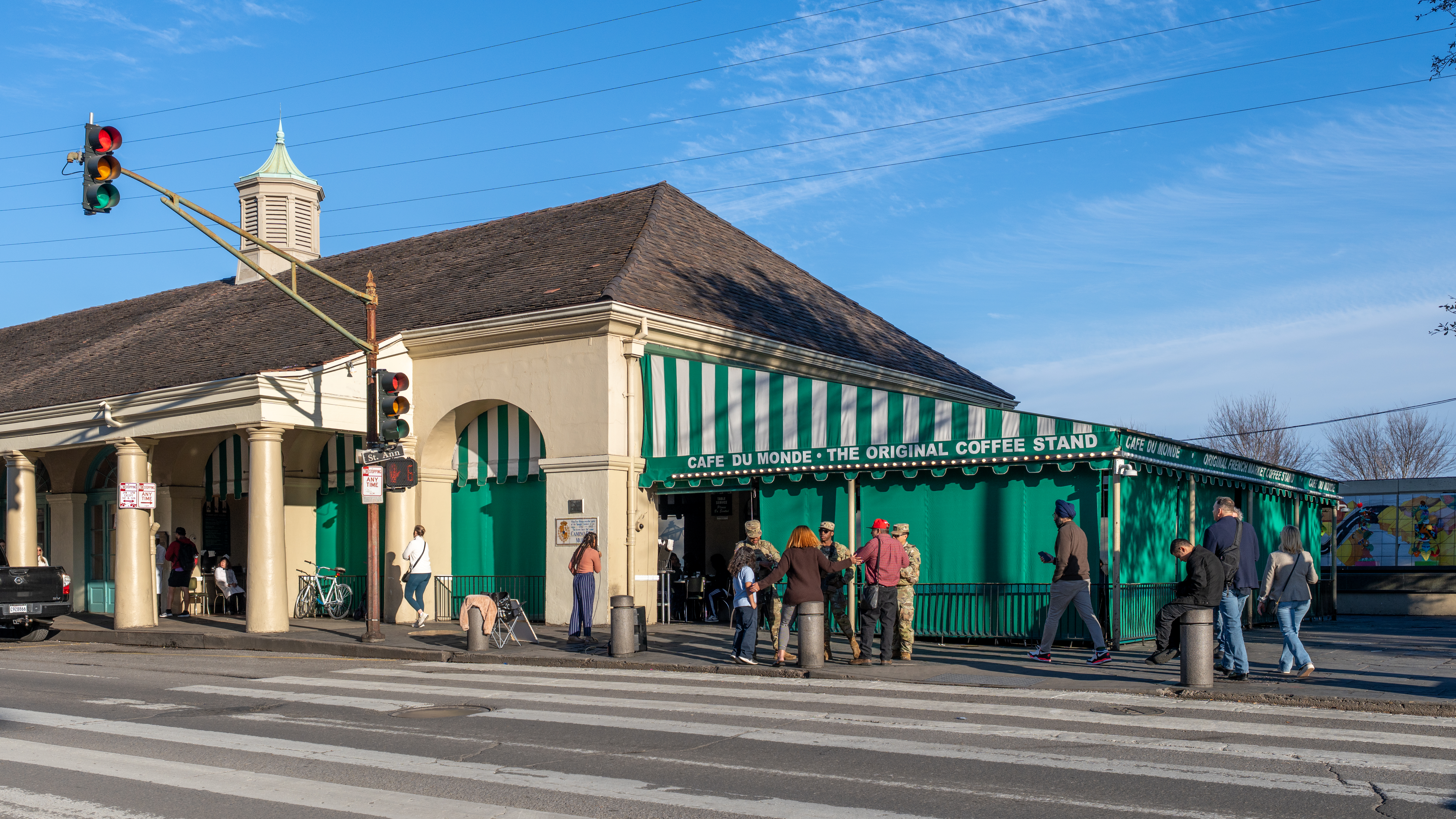
- Café Du Monde is open 24 hours a day (2026)
- Interactive map of Café Du Monde

Restaurant information
- Established: 1862; 164 years ago
- Owner: Fernandez family
- Food type: Coffee & beignets
- Dress code: Casual
- Location: 800 Decatur Street, New Orleans, Louisiana, 70116, United States
- Seating capacity: 400
- Reservations: No
- Website: Cafedumonde.com

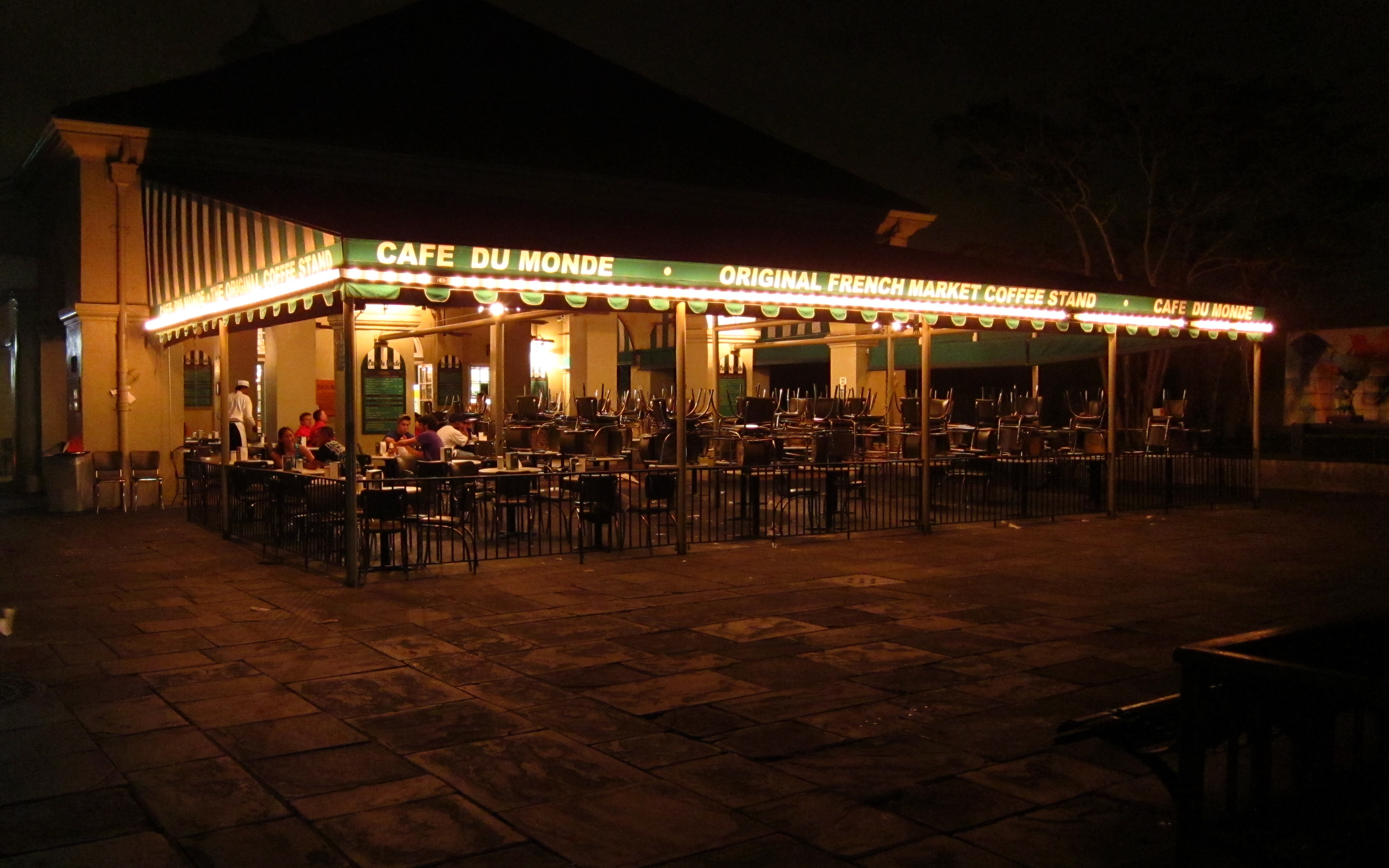
Night view of Cafe du Monde (2010)

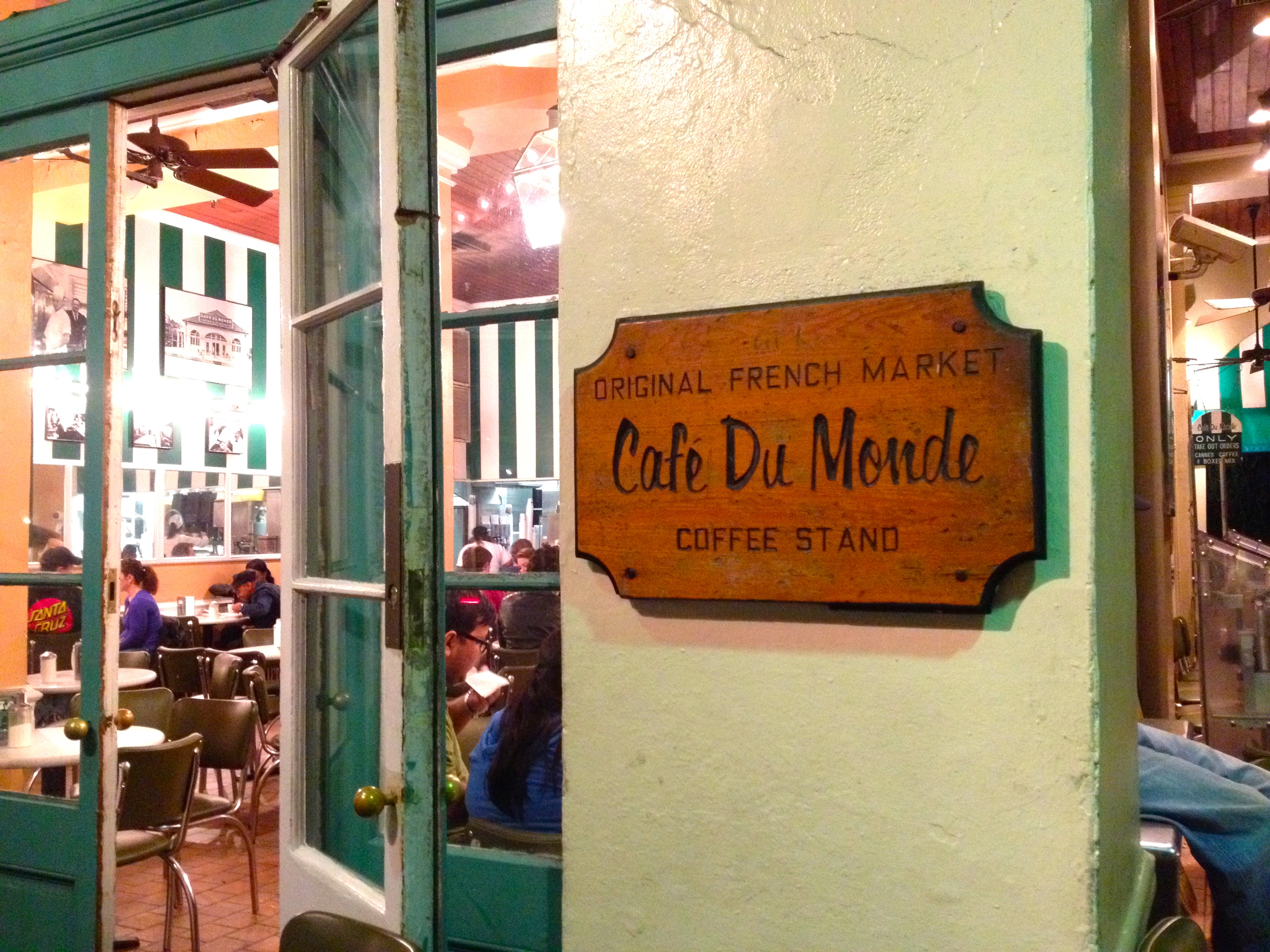
"Original French Market Coffee Stand"

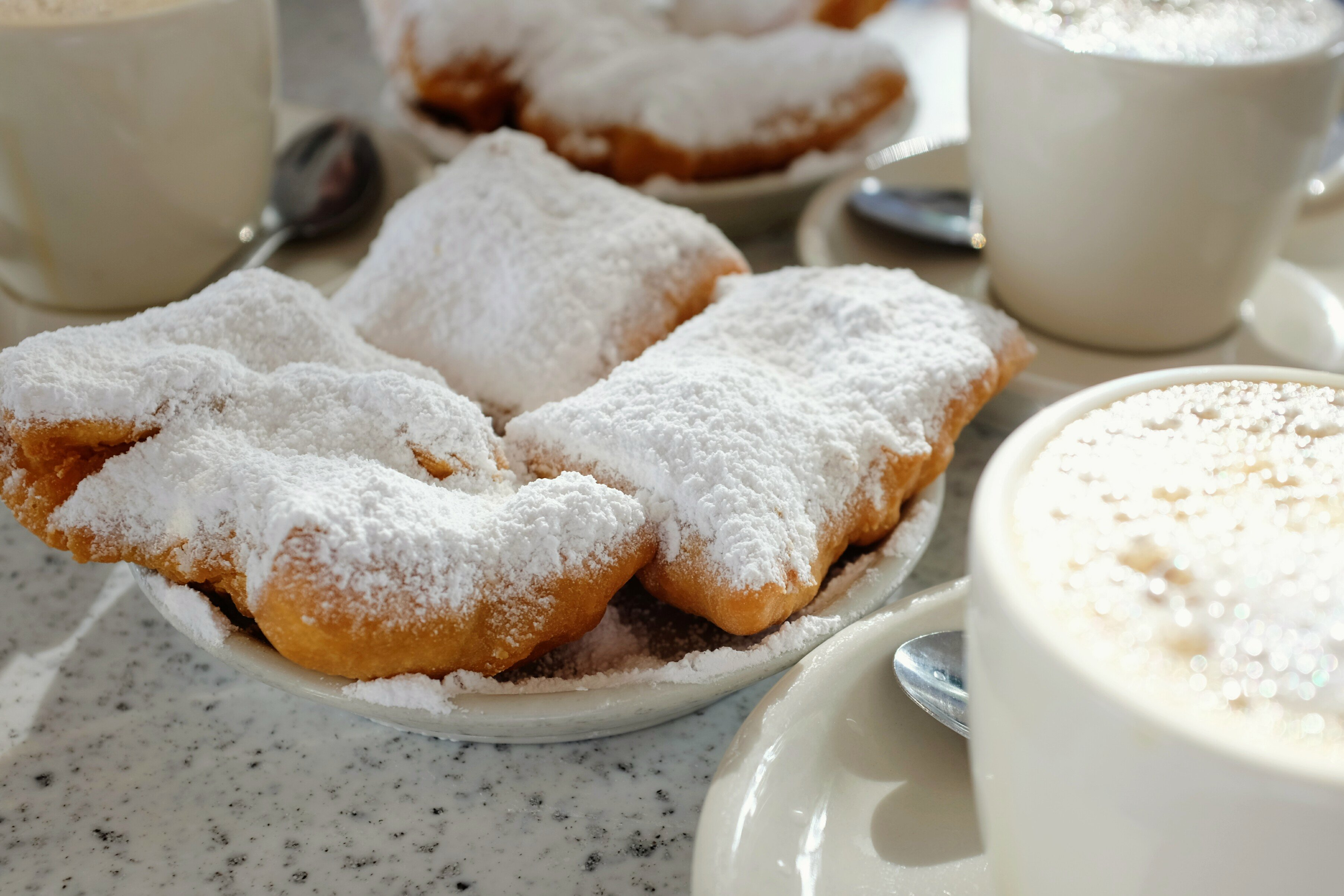
Café au lait and beignets at Café Du Monde in New Orleans

Preparing beignets in Café du Monde.

Café du Monde (French for 'Café of the World' or 'the People's Café') is an open-air coffee shop located on Decatur Street in the French Quarter of New Orleans, Louisiana, United States. It is a New Orleans landmark and tourist destination, known for its café au lait and beignets.

== History ==
The French founded the city of New Orleans on the Mississippi River in 1718, and coffee became a part of the city's culture. Green coffee from the Caribbean—where coffee was first cultivated in the Americas—began arriving at the port of New Orleans in the late 1700s. During the American Civil War, New Orleans was blockaded, and residents stretched their coffee with chicory root. The blend developed into a tradition and has continued to be served at Café Du Monde and other New Orleans restaurants. Roasted chicory root has a nutty, bittersweet flavor that complements coffee.

The Acadians (Cajuns) from Nova Scotia brought other French customs, such as the beignet, to Louisiana in the 18th century. Unlike most doughnuts, beignets are squared pieces of dough with no hole in the middle and are most often covered with powdered sugar. Sometimes they are seen served with fruit, jam, maple syrup, or even savory items. At Café du Monde, the beignets are served with a thick coating of powdered sugar and sold in orders of three.

Café Du Monde is the oldest coffee shop in New Orleans, opening as a simple coffee stand in 1862. Its simple menu has changed little since that era, still including dark-roasted coffee with chicory (served black or au lait), beignets, white and chocolate milk, hot chocolate, and fresh-squeezed orange juice. Sodas and iced coffee are more recent additions. According to the Café du Monde's vice-president, Burton E. Benrud Jr., the beignets remain the only food item on the French Market location's menu; and Café Du Monde is committed to "keeping things the way they've always been: recipes have gone relatively unchanged."

=== Post-Katrina ===
Due to Hurricane Katrina, the shop closed at midnight on August 27, 2005. Although it suffered only minor damage, it remained closed for nearly two months. Owners took advantage of the low-traffic interval afterwards to refurbish the eating areas and kitchens. Six weeks after the hurricane, Café Du Monde began promoting its re-opening as a sign that the city's recovery had begun. Over 100 news media outlets, including ABC-TV's Good Morning America, reported on the re-opening. The French Quarter location reopened on October 19, 2005, to national media attention.

== Locations ==
"The Butcher's Hall" is the name of the original building at the French Market site where the Café Du Monde is located. It was built by the Spanish in 1791; however, it was damaged by a hurricane in 1812. A new market building went up in 1813. The coffee stand was established at the upriver end of the French Market in 1862.

For over a century, Café Du Monde was one of two similar coffee-and-beignet places in the Market, the other being Morning Call, which was established in 1870 and moved out of the old French Market in 1974 to the suburban area of Metairie.

Starting in the late 1980s, Café Du Monde opened additional locations in shopping malls. There are a total of nine Café du Monde coffee stand locations in the New Orleans metropolitan area: the original located in the French Market at 800 Decatur Street, Riverwalk Marketplace, Esplanade Mall, Lakeside Mall, Oakwood Mall, Veterans Boulevard, Mandeville, Covington, City Park in New Orleans, and New Orleans Louis Armstrong International Airport.

=== Japanese franchise ===
After the 1984 Louisiana World Exposition in New Orleans, Café Du Monde was approached by Japanese businesses interested in expanding the brand to Japan. In 1989 the Duskin Company formally contacted Café Du Monde, and a franchise agreement was agreed in time for Duskin to open its first Japanese outlets in 1990. The franchise expanded to a peak of 32 locations.

For the most part, the Japanese Café Du Monde franchise kept the same aesthetic as the original locations: green and white color scheme and the style of French Quarter architecture. Unlike the Café Du Monde stores in Louisiana, the Japan franchise expanded the original menu by adding different varieties of beignets, but the Café Du Monde coffee with chicory stayed the same. Along with their varieties of beignet toppings, the Japanese franchise also offered seasonal desserts, which are not offered at Café Du Monde in Louisiana.

However, as of 2016 there were only 10 locations in Japan. In early 2018, Duskin ended the business relationship, closing all Café Du Monde locations in Japan on March 31, 2018.

=== Products ===
Since the early 1990s, Café du Monde coffee can generally be purchased in independent East Asian grocery stores and markets across the Continental United States. Following the Vietnam War, many refugees from the country arrived in the United States, and were accustomed to French-style chicory coffee, a legacy they had in common with Louisiana from the French Colonial era. As more families began to settle in cities around the Gulf Coast, in time many Vietnamese in the New Orleans area began to frequent Café du Monde, as well as work there. Many in this community would send the characteristic orange-yellow tins of Café Du Monde coffee to family and friends around the country, as an alternative to American coffee which lacked chicory and gradually this began to be stocked by markets catering to this demographic. A packaged Café du Monde beignet mix is also available.

== In popular culture ==
Café Du Monde has appeared in multiple fictional depictions of the city including the "Dave Robicheaux" series of novels by James Lee Burke, and novels by John Connolly, Adam Gnade, Poppy Z. Brite, Sherrilyn Kenyon, Anne Rice, Kresley Cole, David Morrell, and Nancy A. Collins. The café as it appeared in 1955 can be seen in an extended sequence in the William Castle film New Orleans Uncensored; and as it appeared pre-Katrina in two scenes of the 2003 movie Runaway Jury.

The business is sung about in the 1974 Jimmy Buffett song, "The Wino and I Know." In a 2009 episode of Man v. Food centered in New Orleans, the restaurant is visited by Adam Richman. In the 2013 movie Now You See Me, the character Merritt McKinney played by Woody Harrelson performs his magic tricks inside the café. In addition, it is featured multiple times in the TV series Tremé. Café Du Monde is prominently featured as a destination spot in the 2014 film Chef, directed by and starring Jon Favreau. The business also appeared in one of “The Simpsons” episodes. The business is also mentioned in the Marcus King song "Too Much Whiskey".

== Gallery ==
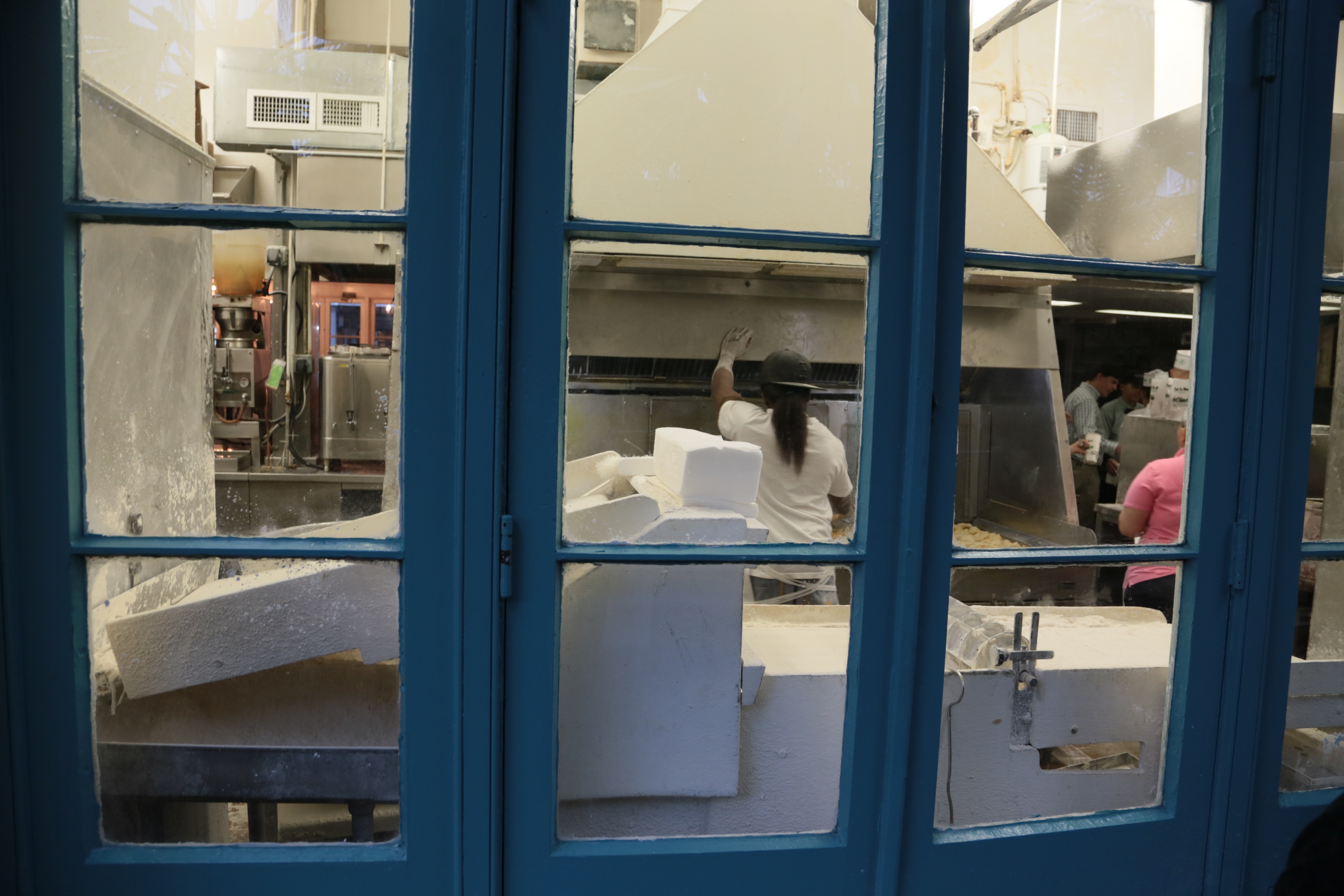
Beignets can be seen being made through the back window in the French Quarter location.

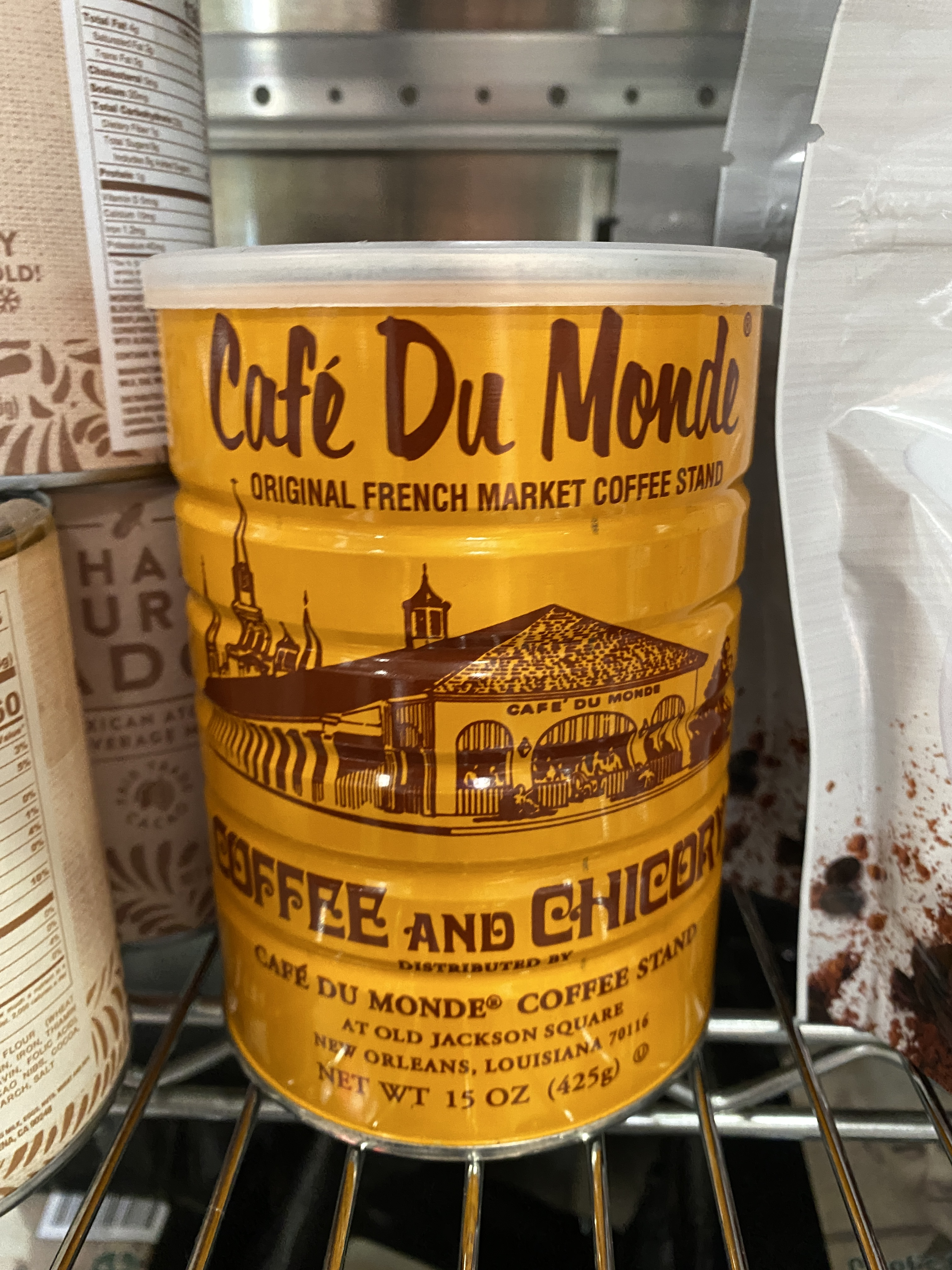
Classic tin of Café du Monde coffee with chicory.

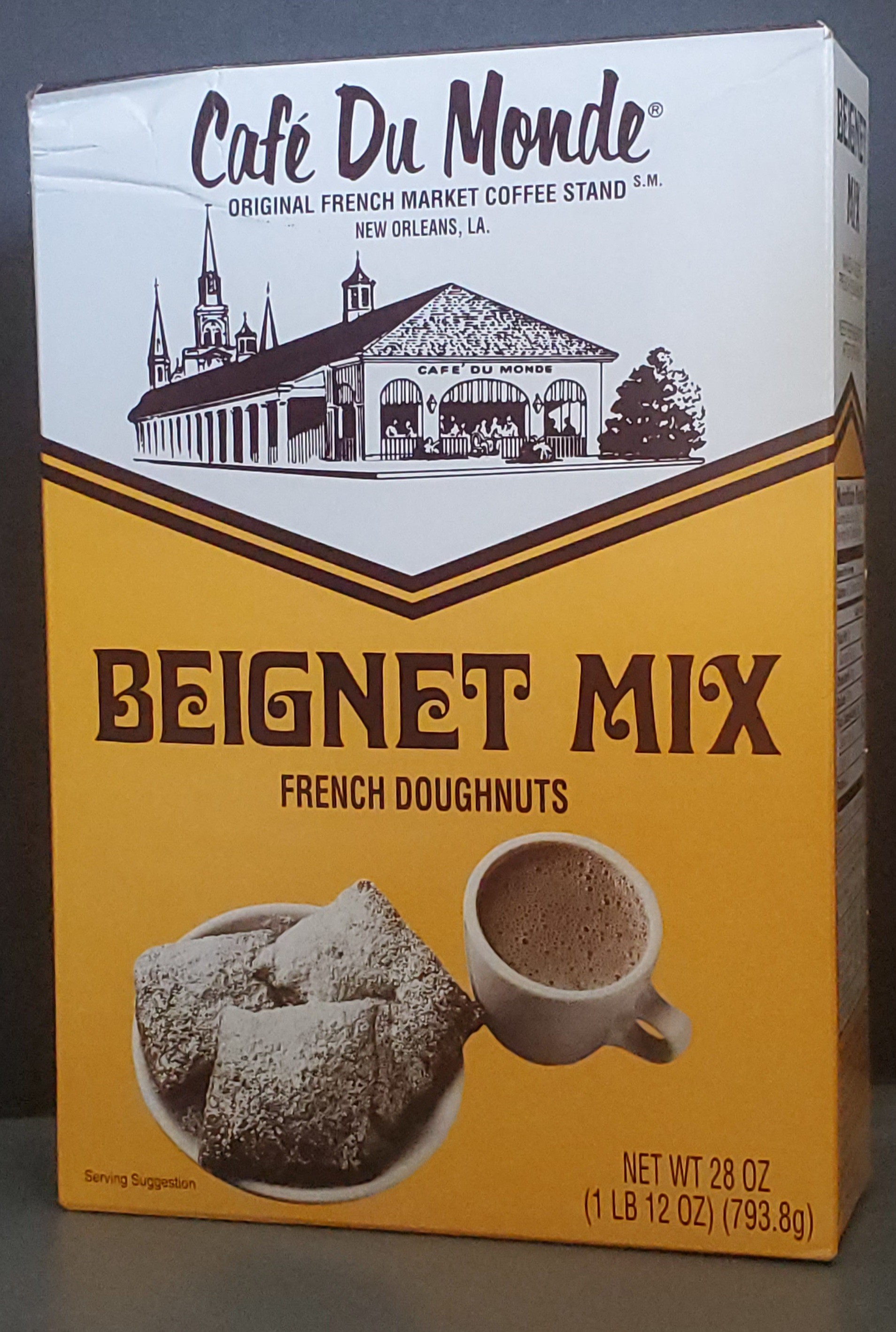
Café du Monde beignet mix.

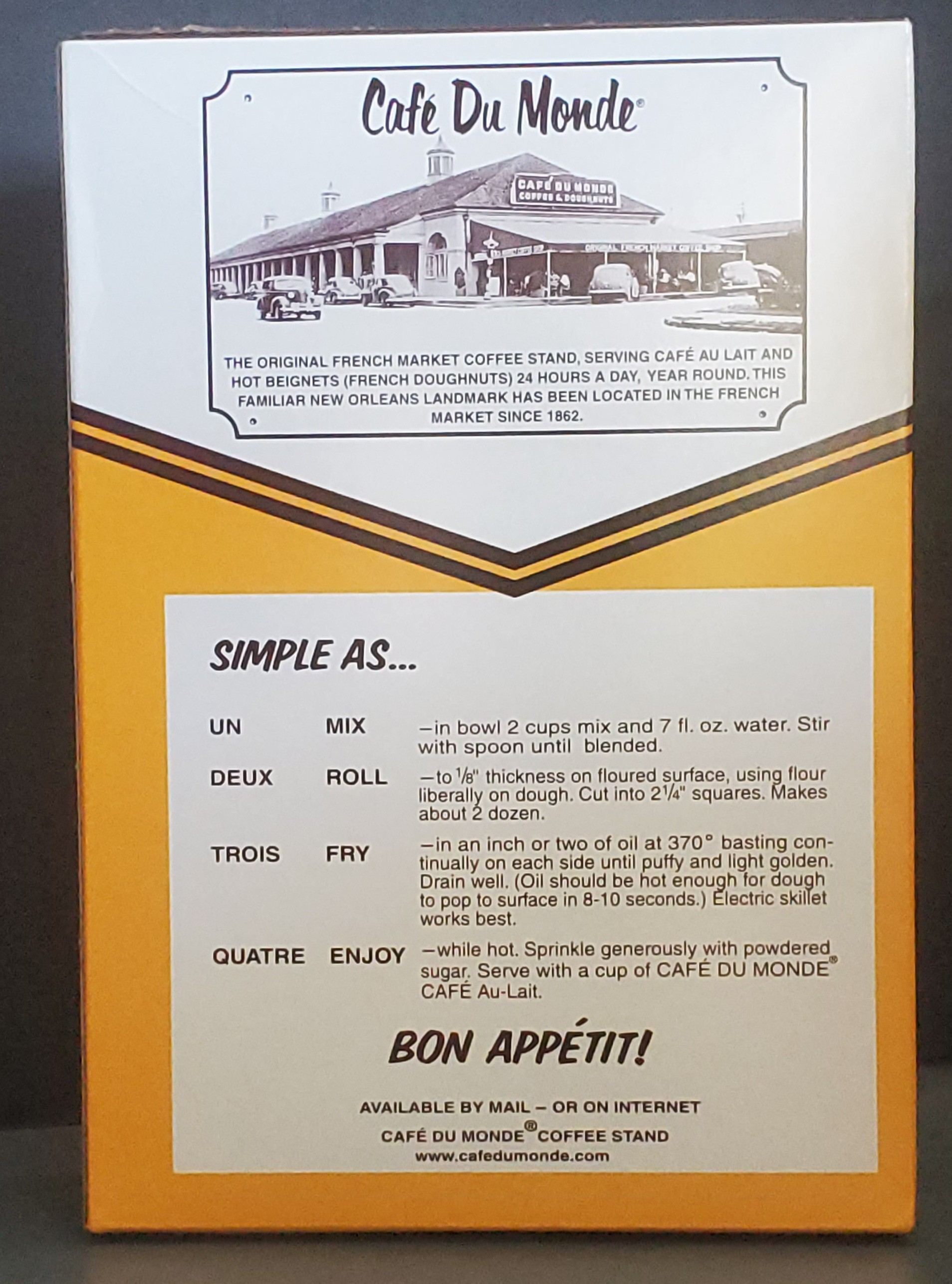
History and beignet mix instructions.

== See also ==
- French Market
- List of doughnut shops
- List of Louisiana Creole restaurants
