= Morning Call Coffee Stand =

Series of coffeehouses in the New Orleans, Louisiana metropolitan area

Coordinates: 29.982472°N 90.110272°W

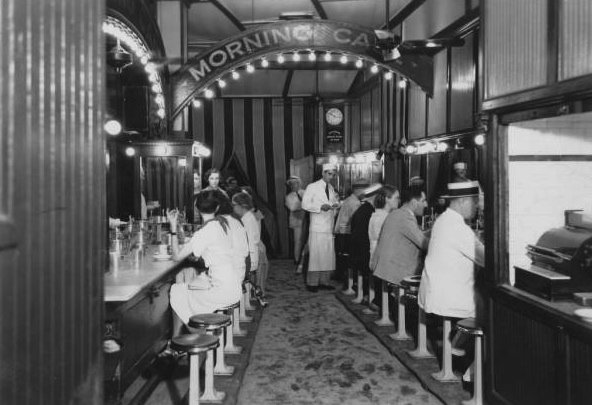
- Morning Call in the French Market, 1930s
- Interactive map of Morning Call Coffee Stand

Restaurant information
- Established: 1870; 156 years ago
- Food type: Coffee & beignets
- Dress code: Casual
- Location: 5101 Canal Boulevard, Suite A, New Orleans, Louisiana, 70124, United States
- Reservations: No
- Website: Morning Call Coffee Stand

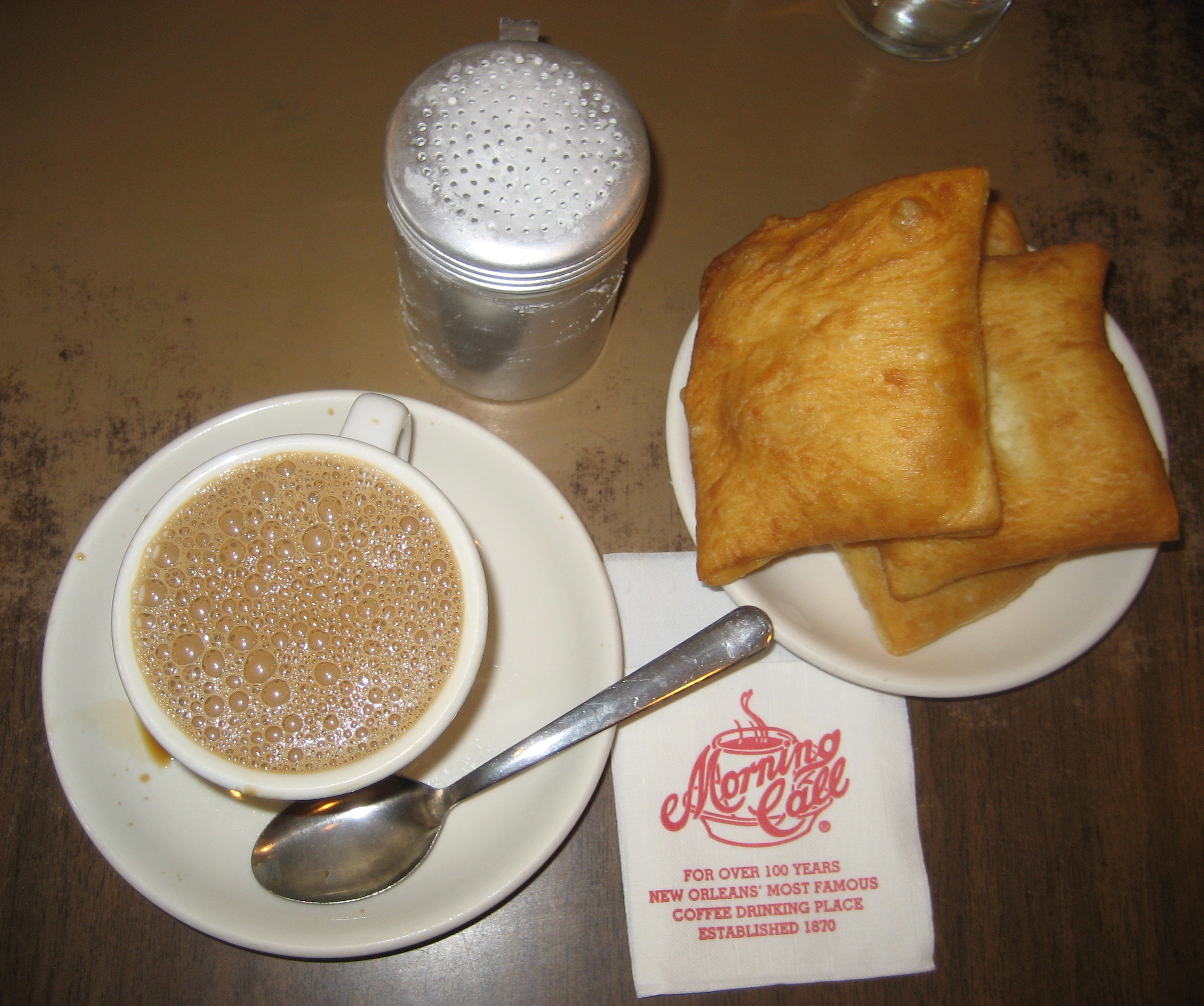
Morning Call's signature café au lait and beignets with a powdered sugar shaker.

Morning Call Coffee Stand is the name of a series of coffeehouses in the New Orleans metropolitan area that have served New Orleans-style café au lait and beignets. It is the second oldest such business in Greater New Orleans, after Café du Monde.

Morning Call was opened by Joseph Jurisch in 1870, at the lower end of the New Orleans French Market, eight years after its main competitor, Café du Monde, opened a few blocks upriver in the French Quarter. For over a century it was a French Quarter landmark. Locals long had personal opinions regarding whether they preferred Morning Call, or the original Café du Monde two blocks away. For decades both Morning Call and Cafe Du Monde offered automobile curb service.

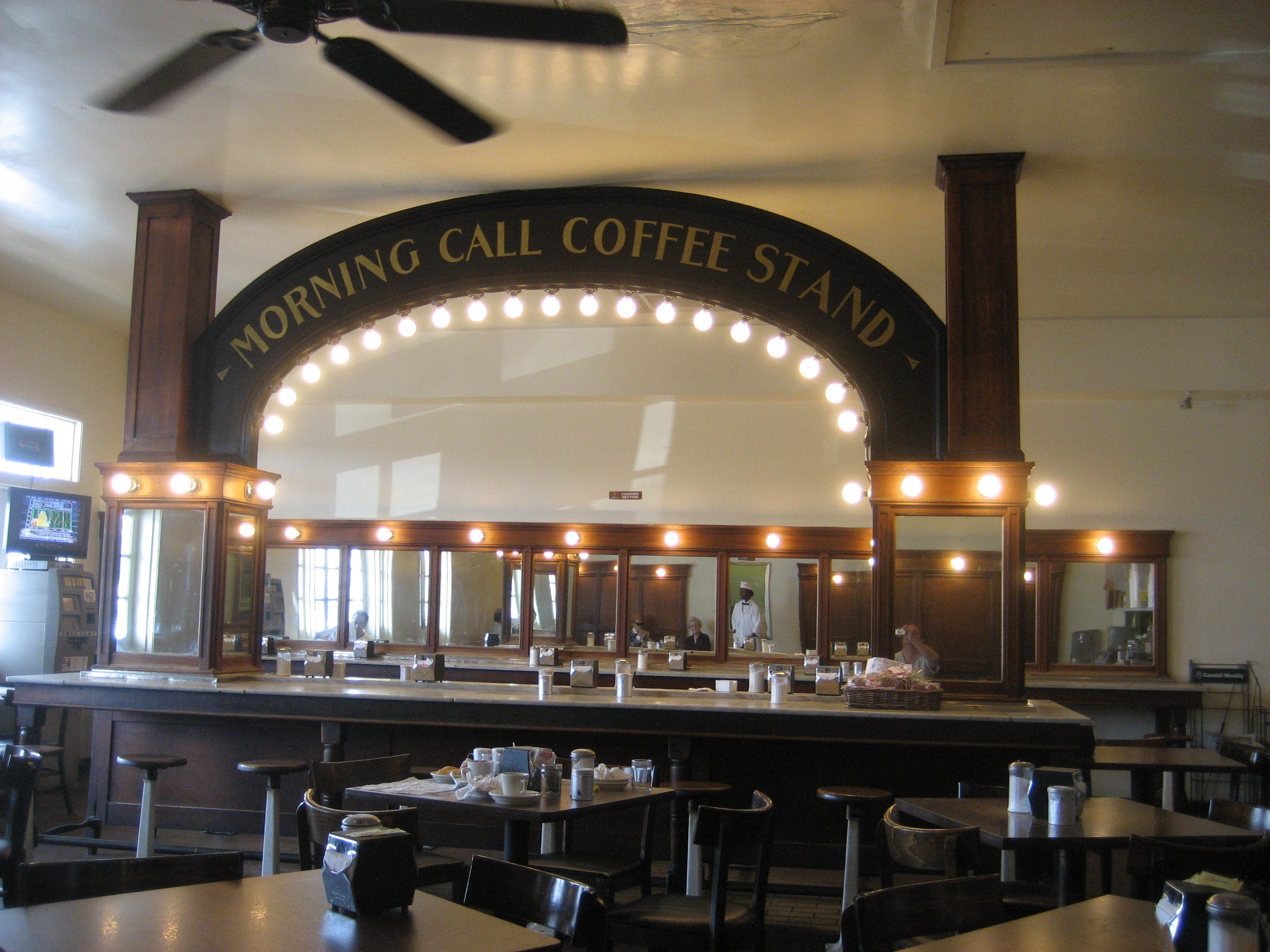
Morning Call in Metairie, 2008

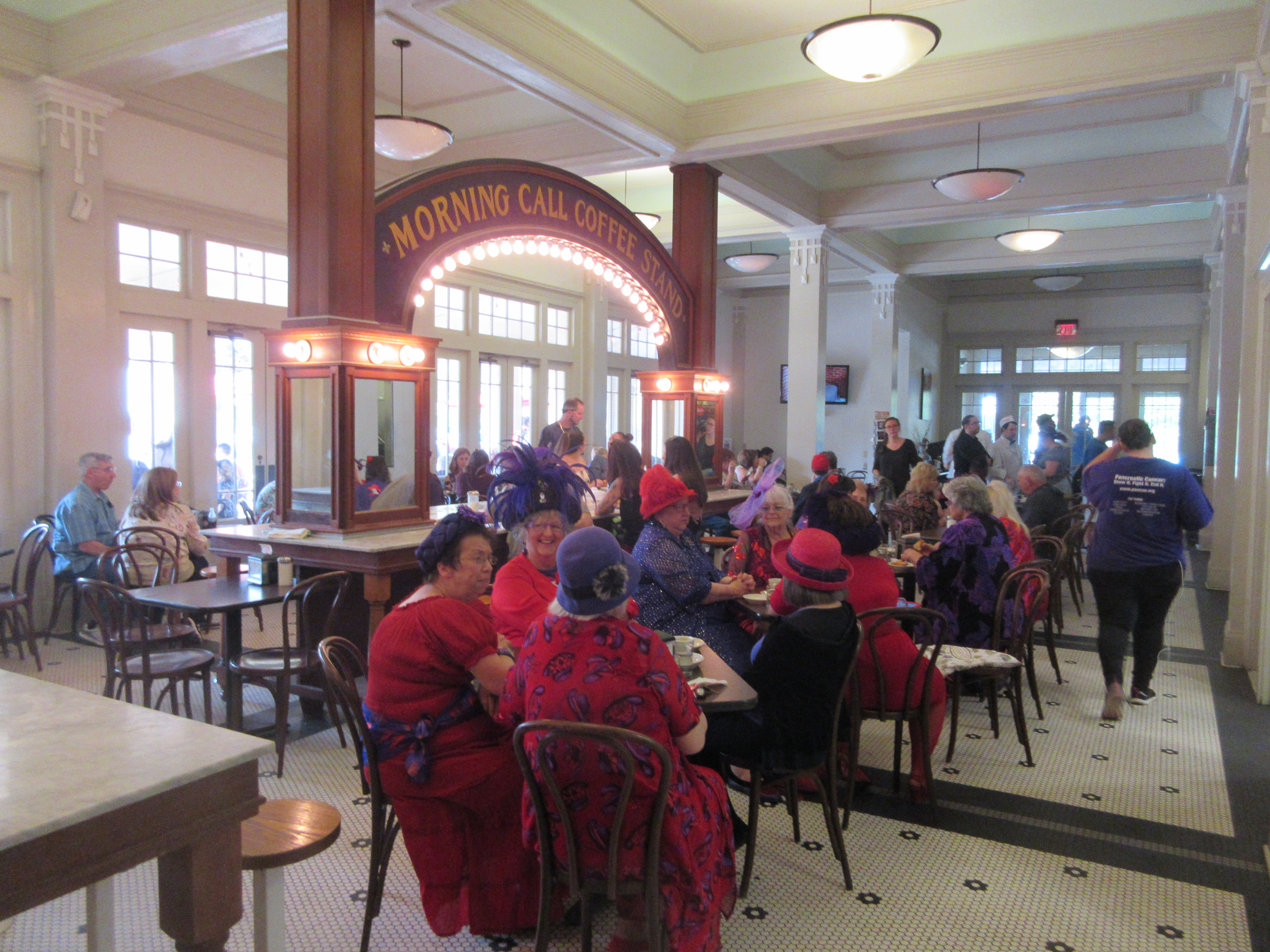
Morning Call in City Park, 2018

In 1974, confronting rent increases and the redevelopment of the French Market district, the owners of the Morning Call closed the original location and moved to Fat City, a commercial district in Metairie, Louisiana, in Jefferson Parish.

In 2012, Morning Call returned to New Orleans when they opened a second location in New Orleans' City Park Casino Building.

In April 2018, the Metairie, Louisiana, location was closed. Rising lease rates, expenses and the competition of many more new coffee shops nearby was cited as reasons for closing this location. Bob Hennessey, who runs Morning Call said “We’re not going out of business, we’re focused on the New Orleans store.”

In 2018, New Orleans City Park, to ensure the park was getting the highest value for the concession in the Casino Building, began a bid process to award the lease to a local beignet parlor. Morning Call lost the lease to Café du Monde. Morning Call closed its last fixed location in January 2019. The owners of Morning Call vowed to return in a different location. In 2019 Morning Call continued with a series of pop-ups in Greater New Orleans while in negotiations for a new permanent location. In May 2020, Morning Call returned to the City Park Area, opening its current location at 5115 Canal Blvd.
