= Morning Call =

Morning Call may refer to:

- A morning bugle call or trumpet call, used in the U.S. military
- A wake-up call
- Morning Call (TV program), a U.S. business-news television series on CNBC
- Morning Call (film), a 1957 British thriller film
- Morning Call, a band signed to Drive-Thru Records
- Morning Call Coffee Stand, a coffeehouse in New Orleans, Louisiana, U.S.
- The Morning Call, a newspaper in Allentown, Pennsylvania, United States
- The San Francisco Morning Call, a newspaper in San Francisco, California
