= Café au lait =

Drink made with coffee and hot milk

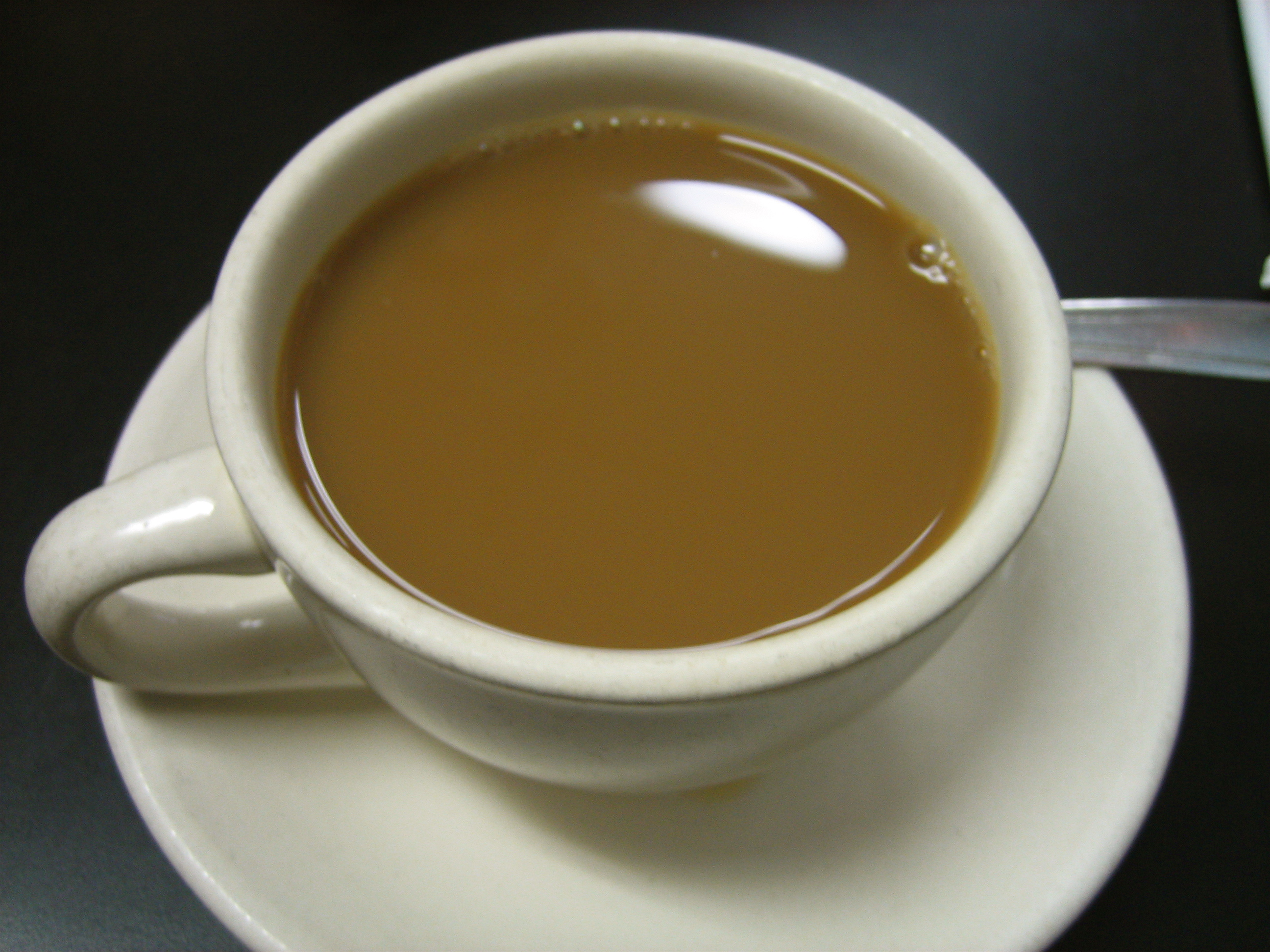
- Type: Beverage
- Place of origin: France
- Main ingredients: Coffee with hot milk

Café au lait (/ˌkæfeɪ oʊ ˈleɪ, kæˌfeɪ, kə-/; French: [kafe o lɛ]; French 'coffee with milk') is coffee with hot milk added. It differs from white coffee, which is coffee with cold milk or other whiteners added.

In France, it is typically served as a breakfast drink, often as a large portion in a handleless bowl.

== Variations ==
=== United States ===
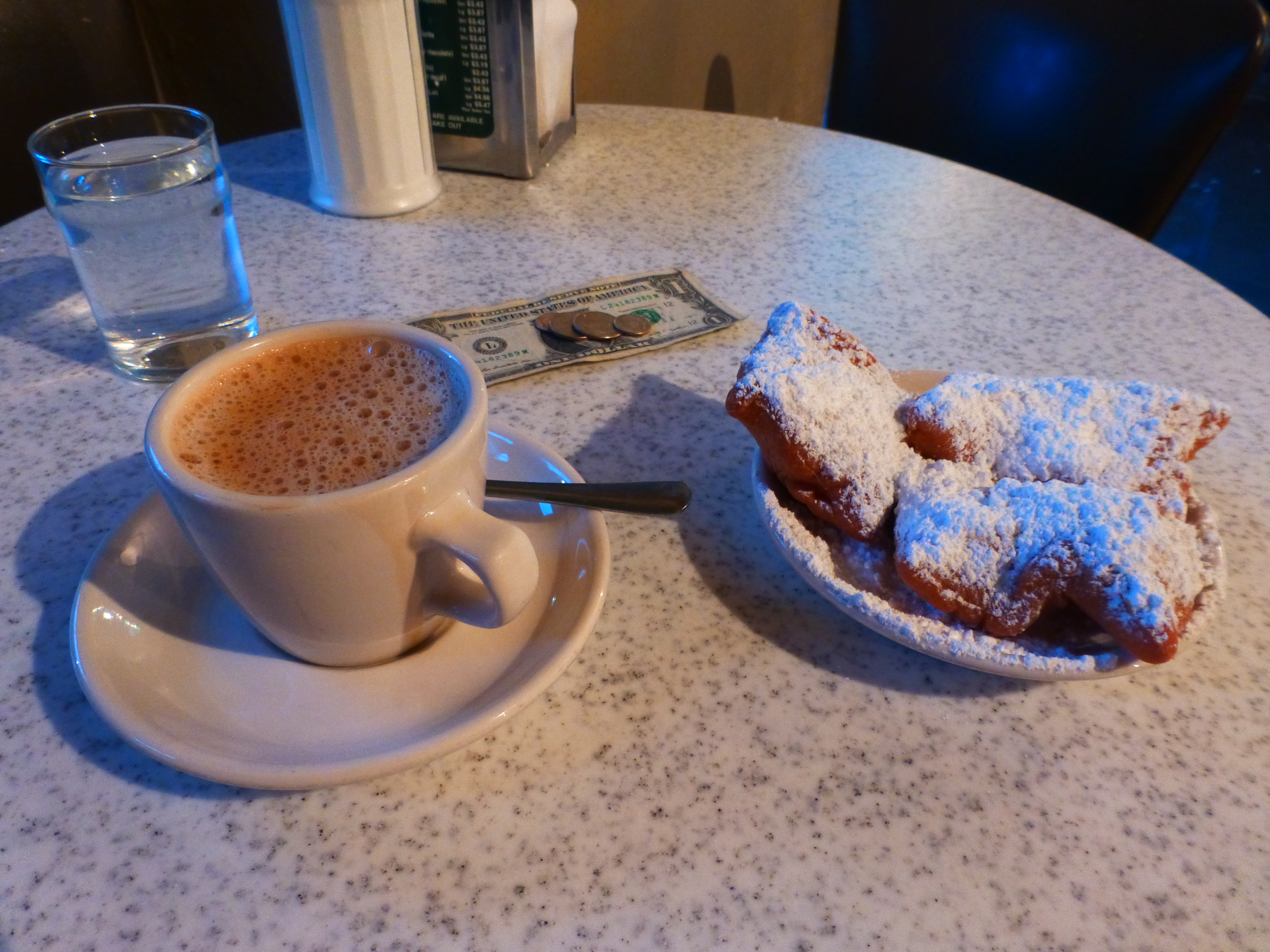
A café au lait and beignets served in Café du Monde, New Orleans

In many American coffeehouses, a café au lait is a drink of strong drip brewed or French pressed coffee, to which steamed milk is added; this contrasts with a caffè latte, which uses espresso as a base. American café au lait is generally served in a cup, as with brewed coffee, being served in a bowl only at shops which wish to emphasize French tradition.

At Starbucks, Cafe Au Lait is known as "Caffe Misto" which is served with 1:1 ratio of French Press brewed Coffee and frothed milk.

Café au lait is a popular drink in New Orleans, available at coffee shops like Café du Monde and Morning Call Coffee Stand, where it is made with milk and coffee mixed with chicory. Unlike the European café style, a New Orleans-style café au lait is made with scalded milk (milk warmed over heat to just below boiling), rather than with steamed milk. The use of roasted chicory root as an extender in coffee became common in Louisiana during the American Civil War, when Union naval blockades cut off the Port of New Orleans, forcing citizens to stretch out the coffee supply. In New Orleans, café au lait is traditionally drunk while eating beignets dusted with powdered sugar, which offsets the bitterness of the chicory. The taste for coffee and chicory was developed by the French during their civil war. Coffee was scarce during those times, and they found that chicory added body and flavor to the brew. The Acadians from Maritime Canada brought this taste and many other French customs (heritage) to Louisiana.

== See also ==
- Cappuccino
- Flat white
- Latte
- List of coffee beverages
