= White coffee =

Number of different kinds of coffees or coffee substitutes

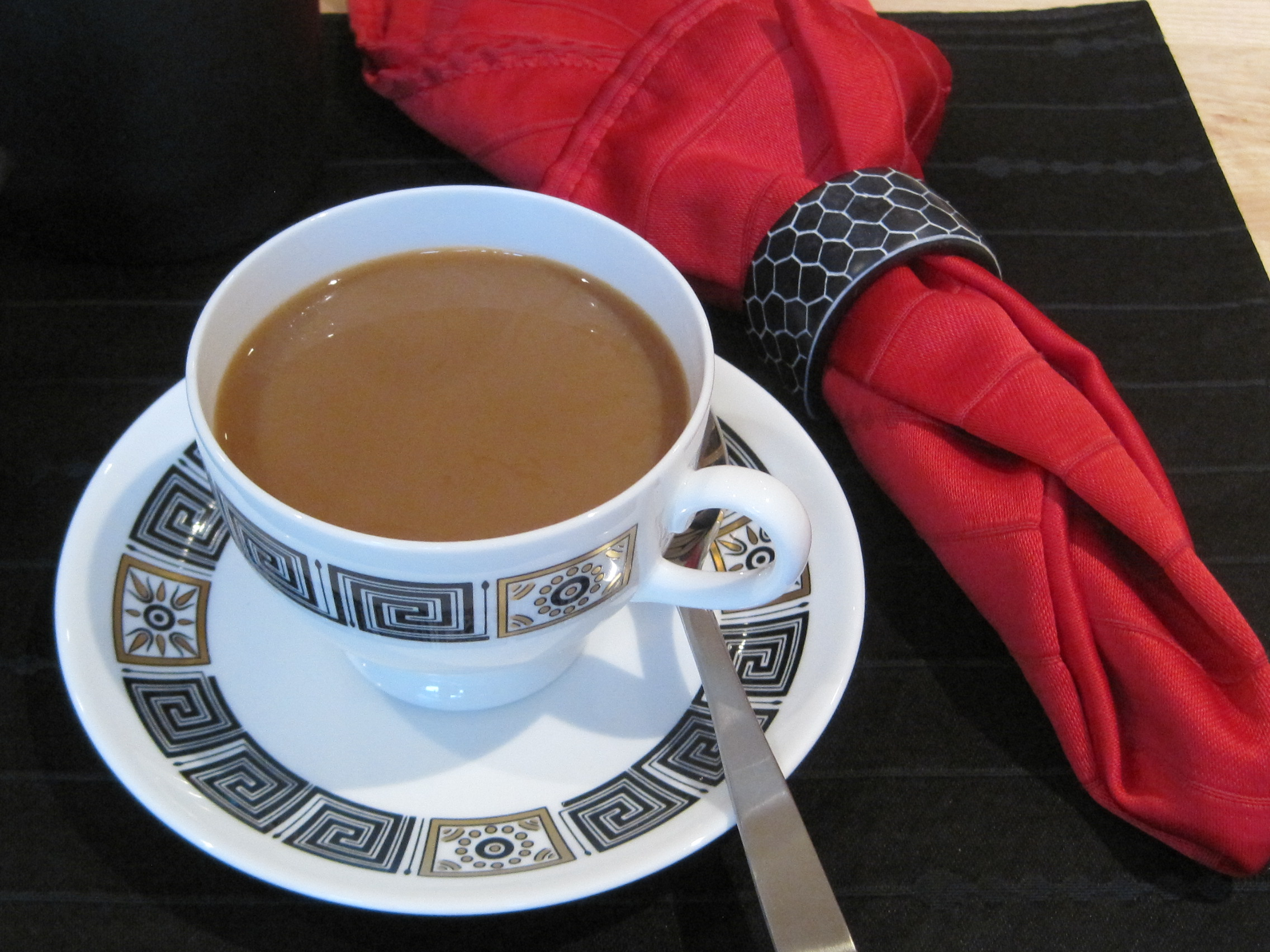
- Coffee with whitener

White coffee can refer to any of a number of different kinds of coffees or coffee substitutes worldwide.

== White coffee ==
In many English-speaking countries, "white coffee" is used to refer to regular black coffee that has had milk, cream, or some other "whitener" added to it.

Though the term is almost entirely unheard of in the US, where the same beverage might be called "coffee light" in the New York City area, "light coffee", "coffee with milk", or "regular coffee" in New England and New York City.

Cream varieties, often called "creamers" in the US, may be made from dairy milk, or be non-dairy creamers derived from corn syrup, soy, or nuts. Sweeteners used include cane sugar, honey, or artificial ingredients. The term “white coffee” in Britain usually means coffee that has some kind of cream or milk added to it, and distinct from “black coffee” which has no dairy components at all.

White coffee should be distinguished from café au lait, in that white coffee uses chilled or room-temperature milk or other whitener, while café au lait uses heated or steamed milk.

== Other coffee drinks ==
=== Malaysia ===
In Malaysia, the original white coffee started in the Old Town of Ipoh and was a drink made from beans roasted in margarine, ground, brewed and served with sweetened condensed milk. Ipoh Oldtown White Coffee continues to be popular throughout the country.

Overseas visitors finding the margarine-roasted coffee beans unorthodox (due to their slight caramelized flavor) are often misled into thinking that there is a type of coffee bean endemic to Malaysia called the "white coffee bean". The beans used are invariably imported beans roasted to a light color.

Local coffee manufacturers now mix instant coffee powder with non-dairy creamer or whitener and sugar, and market the 3-in-1 mixture as white coffee as well. The mixture is preferred by Malaysians at home or in the office as a convenient easy-to-prepare coffee drink. The advisability, however, of consuming instant coffee mixed with non-dairy creamer and sugar daily is slowly coming into question, with some manufacturers now taking the sugar out of the mixture, and marketing the 2-in-1 mixture as sugar-free white coffee.

In the south of Malaysia especially the Coffee Belt region of western Johor where the Liberica variant is planted from Pontian to Senggerang, white coffee refers to coffee beans of the Liberica variant roasted without sugar or margarine.

=== Indonesia ===
In Indonesia, the term white coffee or kopi putih refers to coffee beans which are roasted less than regular coffee beans. The shorter and lower heat roasting yields lighter-colored coffee beans, called biji kopi putih or white coffee beans. The white coffee beans are harder and different in taste than regular coffee beans. White coffee has a savory and mild taste compared to its regular counterpart. Due to its shorter roasting time, white coffee has a higher concentration of caffeine.

=== The Levant ===
White coffee in the Levant "qahwah bayda" (قهوة بيضاء) is a caffeine-free drink made from water, orange blossom water, and sweetened with sugar if desired, or rose water. Although not the most common substitute for coffee it is occasionally served in lieu of coffee (Turkish coffee). Ahweh bayda is traditionally thought to have a soothing effect when taken.

=== United States ===
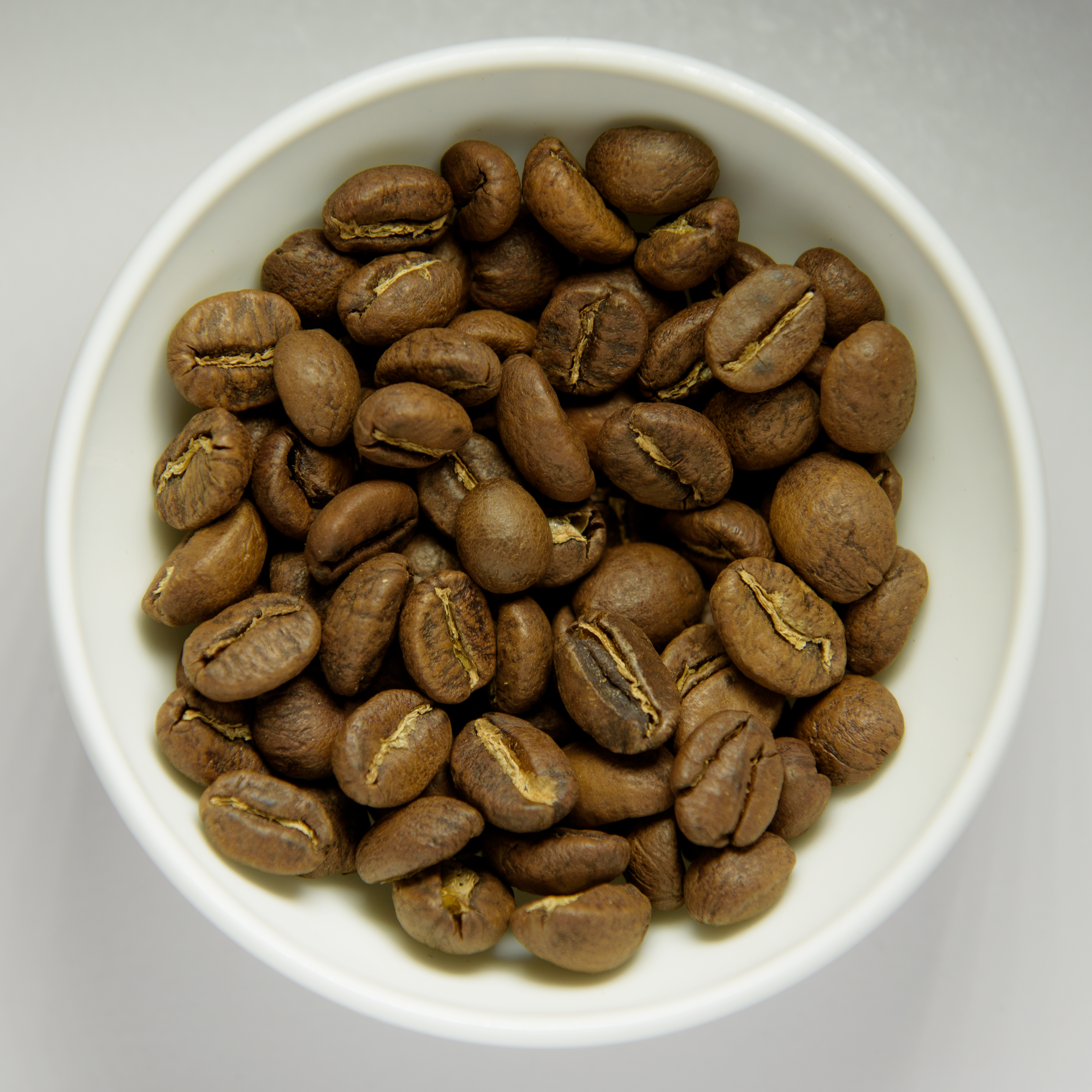
Coffee roasted at a light roast level

In the United States, white coffee may also refer to coffee beans which have been roasted to a yellow roast level. When prepared as espresso these beans produce a thin yellow brew, with a high acidic note. Some sources claim that white coffee is more highly caffeinated than darker roasted coffee, but this is debated. The sublimation point of caffeine is 352 °F (178 °C), about one hundred degrees lower than the typical very dark roast. Coffee beans can catch fire at temperatures higher than 500 °F (260 °C). White coffee is generally used only for making espresso drinks, not simple brewed coffee. With shorter roasting times, natural sugars are not caramelized within the coffee beans, making the coffee less bitter. The flavor of white coffee is frequently described as nutlike, with pronounced acidity. White coffee is usually purchased pre-ground due to the fact that the beans are harder than regular coffee, making them difficult to grind, even using a commercial grinder. For this reason, white coffee usually pours fast when using a commercial espresso machine. It is common for baristas to use the second pour rather than the first because it is believed to have more caffeine and a smoother flavor.

=== Yemen ===
There is also a form of white coffee, native to Yemen, which refers to the ground shell of the coffee bean. This form of coffee earns its name from its color, and is brewed in the same manner as regular coffee, only with some spices added.

=== Singapore ===
The name kopitiam symbolizes Singapore's multilingual culture: "kopi" is Malay for coffee, while "tiam" is Hokkien (or Fukienese) for shop. Kopitiams are mainly open-air gatherings, with a few of food vendors on the first floor of the ubiquitous government-built housing complexes that span entire blocks. The basic kopi that results is a cup of thick coffee that has been squeezed through a cloth sock several inches long and is packed with tablespoons of sugar and sweet condensed milk.
