= 1812 Louisiana hurricane =

Category 3 Atlantic hurricane in 1812

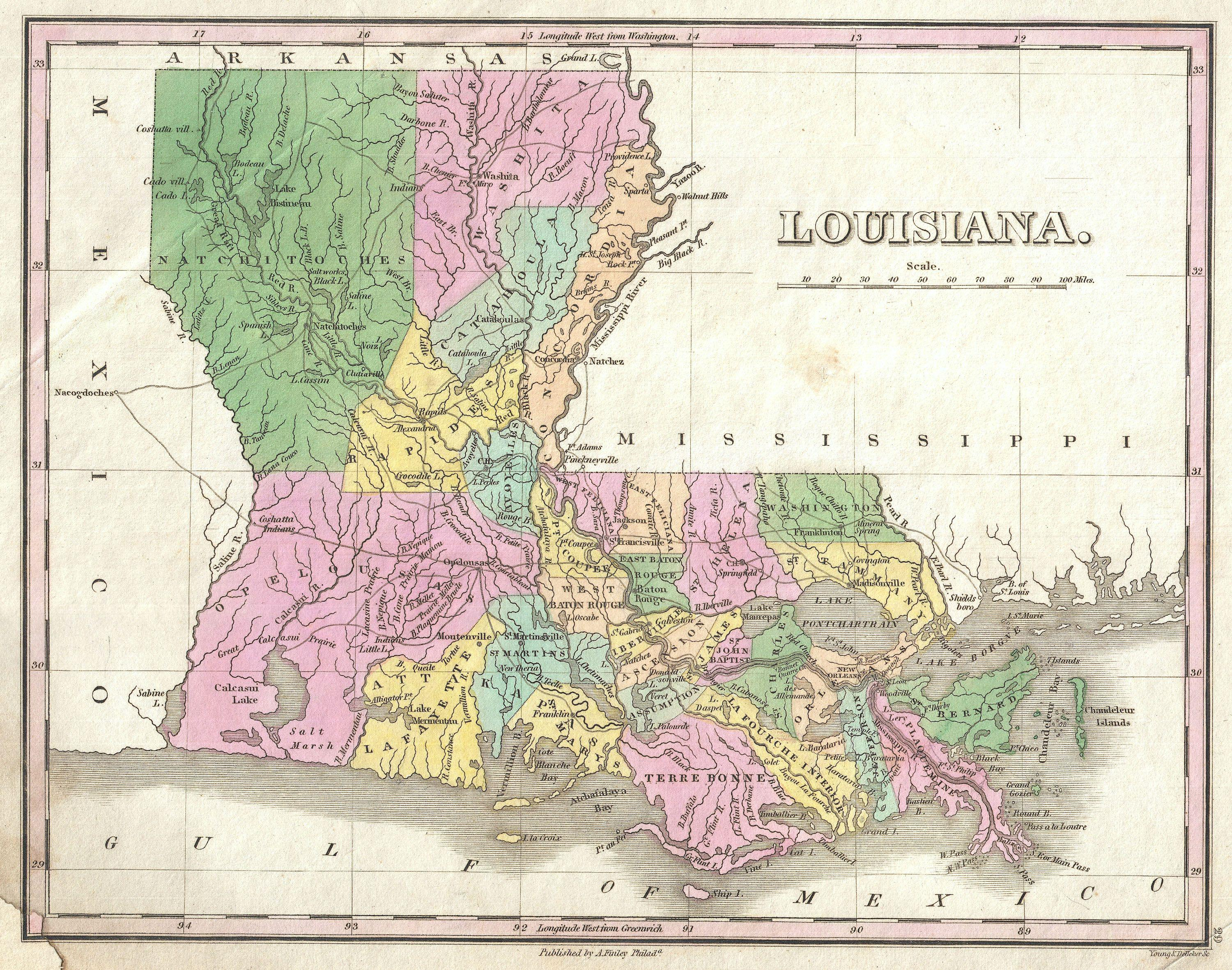
- 1827 map of Louisiana, where the hurricane made landfall

Meteorological history
- Formed: August 15, 1812
- Dissipated: August 20, 1812

Category 3 major hurricane
- 1-minute sustained (SSHWS/NWS)
- Highest winds: 115 mph (185 km/h)
- Lowest pressure: ≤995 mbar (hPa); ≤29.38 inHg

Overall effects
- Fatalities: c. 100
- Damage: $6 million (1812 USD)
- Areas affected: Jamaica, Spanish Florida, Louisiana, Mississippi Territory
- Part of the 1812 Atlantic hurricane season

The 1812 Louisiana Hurricane was a major hurricane that struck New Orleans, Louisiana, during the War of 1812. It was the worst storm of the early history of New Orleans and was very likely the hurricane which made the closest landfall known to affect the city.

It was first observed in the eastern Caribbean Sea on August 12 as a tropical disturbance, which later affected Jamaica as a tropical storm. After entering the Gulf of Mexico, it intensified into a hurricane, with winds estimated at over 115 mph (185 km/h). The circulation affected areas from the Florida Panhandle to Natchez in the Mississippi Territory, but the worst effects were in the New Orleans area. There were around 100 deaths, many of them due to drowning.

== Meteorological history ==
On August 12, a tropical disturbance entered the Caribbean Sea to the south of Antigua, believed to have been a strong tropical wave. Moving westward, it developed into a tropical storm by August 15, based on ship observations in the region. That day, it passed to the south of Jamaica and later turned to the northwest. Due to the ongoing War of 1812, there was a British blockade of American ships, which caused a lack of observations in the region. As a result, the storm's track was uncertain, although it is believed that the system entered the Gulf of Mexico by August 18; that day, a ship reported hurricane-force winds. After moving northward, the hurricane turned to the northwest off the coast of Louisiana.

Although meteorologist David Roth assessed the storm as making landfall on August 19 at Isle Dernière to the west of New Orleans, a research paper from the American Meteorological Society estimated that the hurricane moved ashore about 40 mi (60 km) southeast of New Orleans. Modern research suggests the storm was the equivalent of a major hurricane (a Category 3 on the Saffir-Simpson Hurricane Scale), or with winds of at least 115 mph (185 km/h), when it made landfall. It passed just southwest of the city, becoming the closest major hurricane to New Orleans. The wind diameter was average to slightly below-average, and the forward speed was normal. Due to its movement, the hurricane likely maintained much of its strength after making landfall and by the time it affected New Orleans. The hurricane gradually weakened over land, passing near Baton Rouge, Louisiana and Natchez, Mississippi on August 20. Heavy rainfall was reported in eastern Ohio beginning on August 21, potentially from the remnants of the storm merging with a cold front.

== Effect ==
When the storm was moving through the Caribbean Sea, it produced rough seas and heavy rainfall. In Jamaica, gusty winds damaged crops, including to corn and plantains.

As the storm moved ashore in Louisiana, outer rain bands produced gale-force winds and heavy damage at Pensacola, in Spanish West Florida. At Cat Island offshore of Bay St. Louis (claimed from Spain in the same year, as part of the Mississippi Territory), strong winds washed several boats ashore. Hurricane conditions began in New Orleans around 8 p.m. local time on August 19. In southeastern Louisiana, Fort St. Philip sustained heavy damage, after it was flooded. Most soldiers in the fort drowned. There was a rumor during the storm that the British took over Fort St. Philip, causing a panic in the midst of the War of 1812; however, the British fleet was scattered throughout the region, and many British ships were damaged. In New Orleans, the hurricane damaged 53 ships, and several boats were washed ashore along Lake Pontchartrain. The USS Louisiana, a cutter commissioned in 1804, was wrecked during the hurricane while at port in New Orleans, and the entire crew except for the captain was killed. Debris and bodies from the ships were dispersed along the lake's coastline. The USS Viper lost its mast while offshore during the storm. Ten people died on the ship Harlequin.

The storm produced heavy rainfall, along with a powerful storm surge. Flooding up to 15 ft (4.6 m) deep was reported in New Orleans and portions of Plaquemines Parish. In the Parish, 45 people drowned, and there was heavy damage to the sugar crops. The levee system in New Orleans was heavily damaged. The strong waves washed saltwater 75 mi (121 km) up the Mississippi River. High winds damaged most buildings in New Orleans, some of which were destroyed, and most trees were blown down. The city's market house was wrecked, despite being described as "indestructible". Damage was estimated at $6 million (1812 USD), and there were around 100 deaths. Further northwest near Natchez, Mississippi, the storm's winds were strong enough to knock down trees. The barometric pressure there was 986 mbar (29.1 inHg), although the observation was not calibrated and was later corrected to 995 mbar (29.4 inHg) to account for elevation and air temperature.

In the two centuries since the hurricane, the oceans rose about 0.5 ft (0.15 m), the wetlands around New Orleans have diminished, and the elevation has dropped due to subsidence. These have increased the threat to the city of a significant hurricane strike. The 1812 hurricane was not a worst-case scenario for New Orleans, as a stronger and larger hurricane would have caused more damage. If the storm struck in 2012, one researcher estimated the hurricane would have been among the costliest Louisiana hurricanes, comparable to Hurricane Betsy in 1965 and Hurricane Katrina in 2005.
