= French Market =

Market in Louisiana, United States

Coordinates: 29.9590°N 90.0603°W

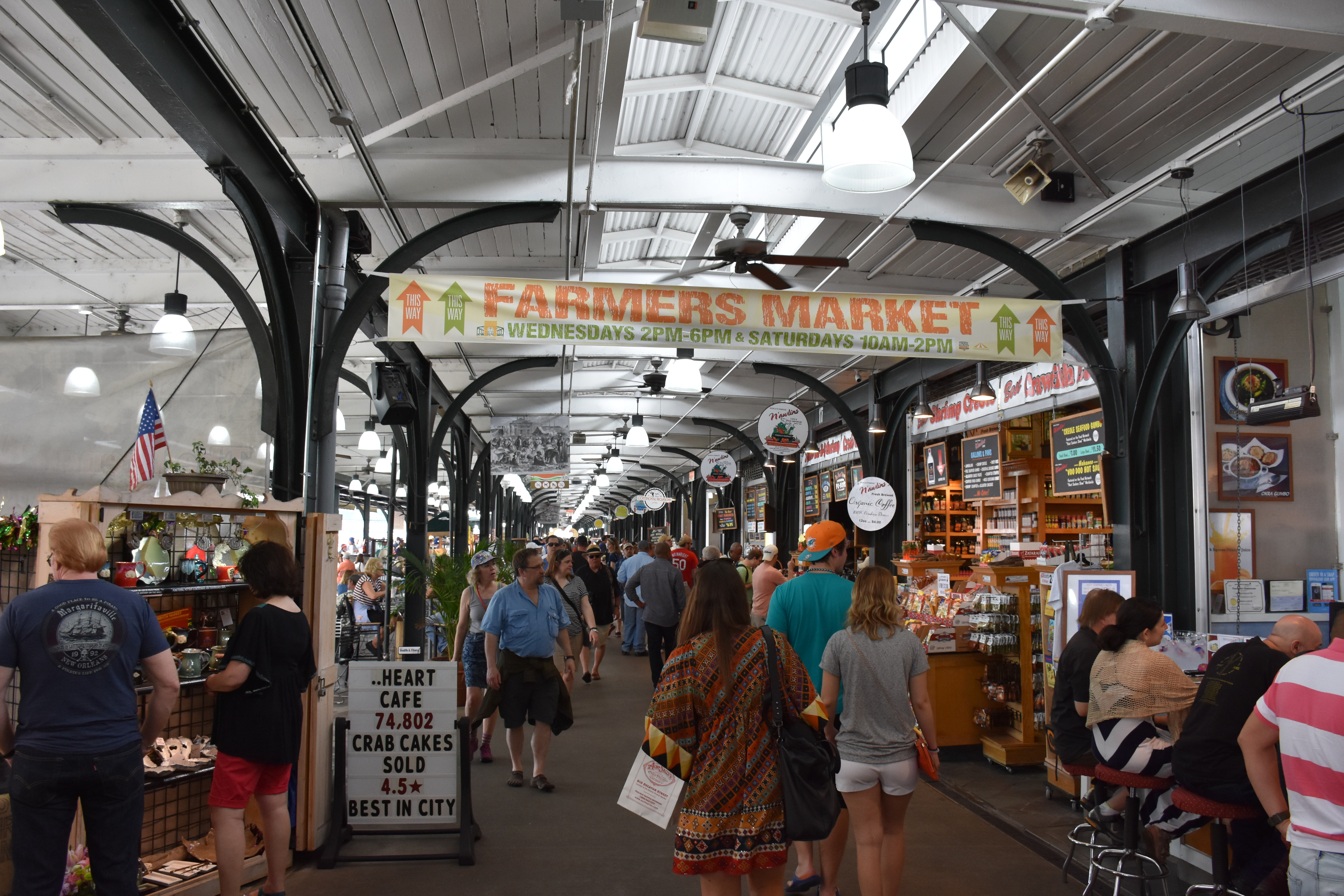
Inside the open-air market space north of Ursulines Street

The French Market (French: Marché français) is a market and series of commercial buildings spanning six blocks in the French Quarter of New Orleans, Louisiana. Founded as a Native American trading post predating European colonization, the market is the oldest of its kind in the United States. It began where Café du Monde currently stands and has been rebuilt and renovated a number of times.

The market is included on the Louisiana African American Heritage Trail.

== Amenities and events ==
Individual vendors purveyed many different fresh foods, including raw seafood, through the mid-20th century.

The cafés and bars offer New Orleans crawfish and other seafood, Cajun food, Creole cooking, desserts, fruits, vegetables, and more. The French Market is also known for hosting some annual events including the French Quarter Festival and the French Market Creole Tomato Festival.

The flea market is especially busy on weekends. Free musical events are often given in the French Market. The New Orleans Jazz National Historical Park office and visitor center is in the French Market.

== History ==
Part of the space has been dedicated as a market since 1791 in the colonial period, but the oldest extant structures date to about 1813.

=== Renovations and rebuilding ===
Major renovations were done by the Works Progress Administration in the 1930s.

Rebuilding and renovations have continued into the 21st century. Much of the area formerly housing arcades of roofed but wall-less merchant stands now houses shops and restaurants separated by doors and walls, catering to the tourism industry.

=== Name ===
The original market, called "the Meat Shops" or "Meat Market," was the only place within the French Quarter that could sell meat. Only after meat was being sold elsewhere did the name change to the "French Market."

== Location ==
The French Market stretches just inland from the Mississippi River in the section of the French Quarter downriver from Jackson Square, from the Café du Monde at the upriver end, to the flea market stalls across from the New Orleans Mint building.

== Gallery ==
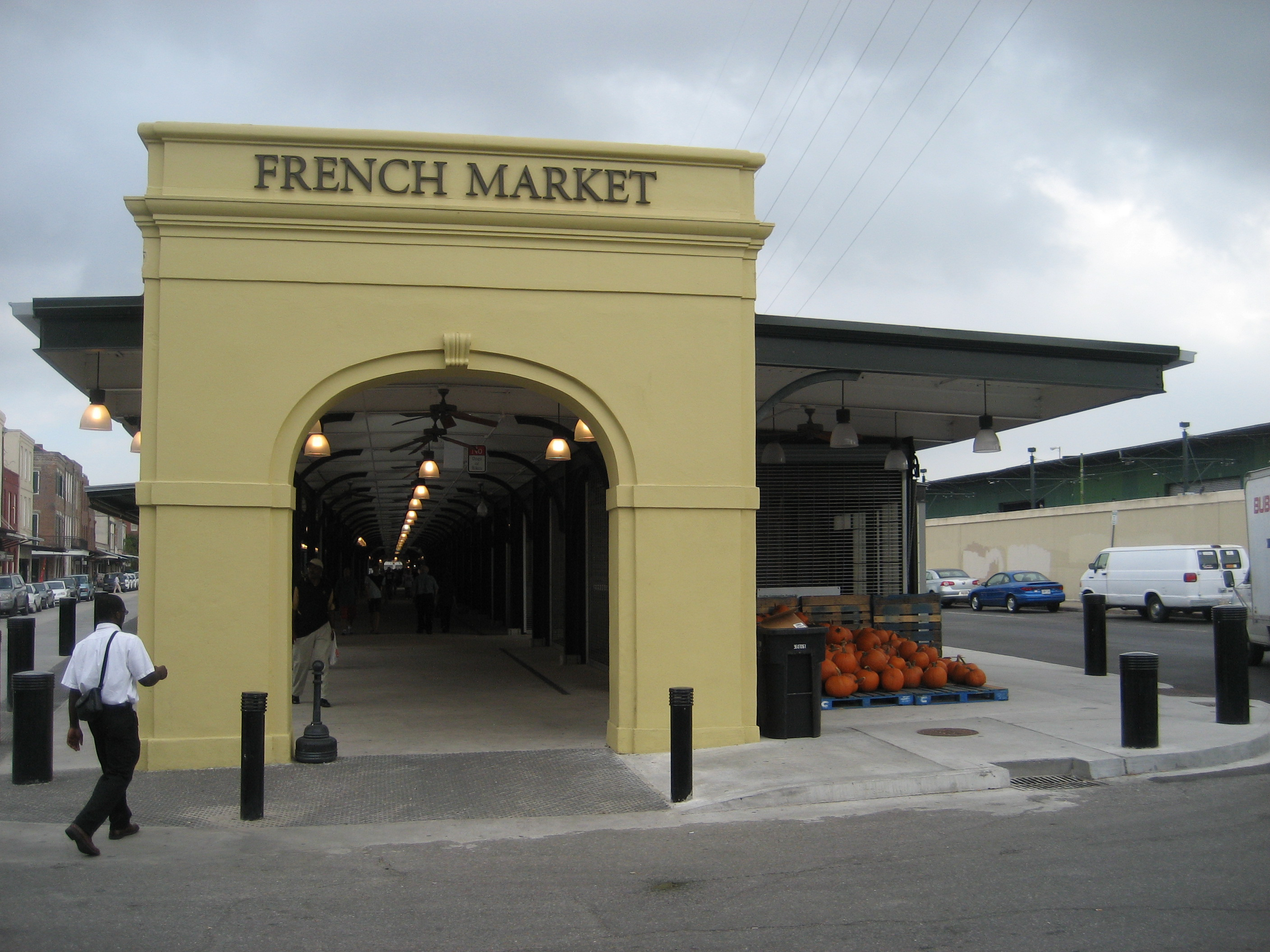
The French Market's Farmers Market & Flea Market stall

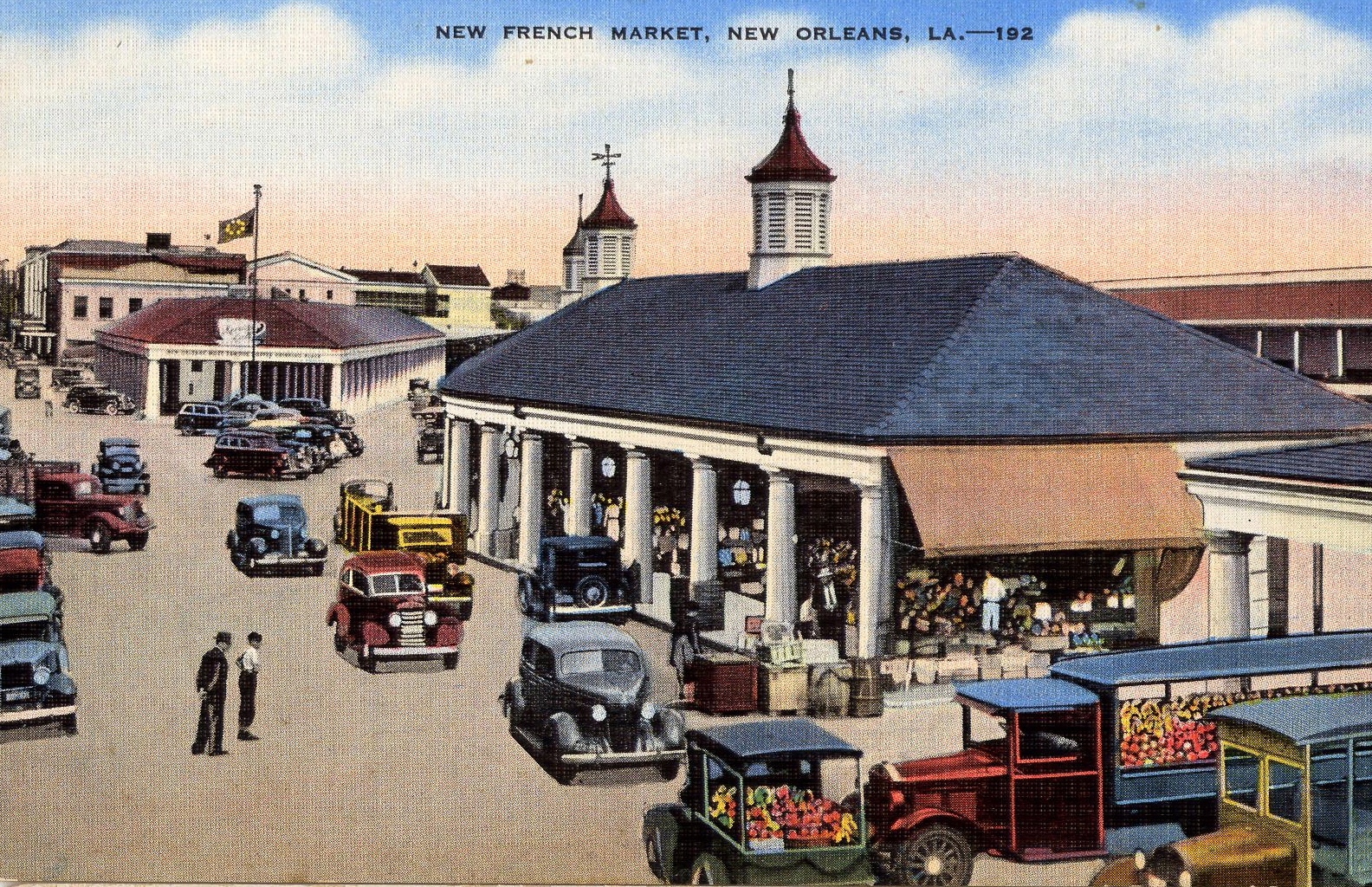
A section of the French Market about 1940

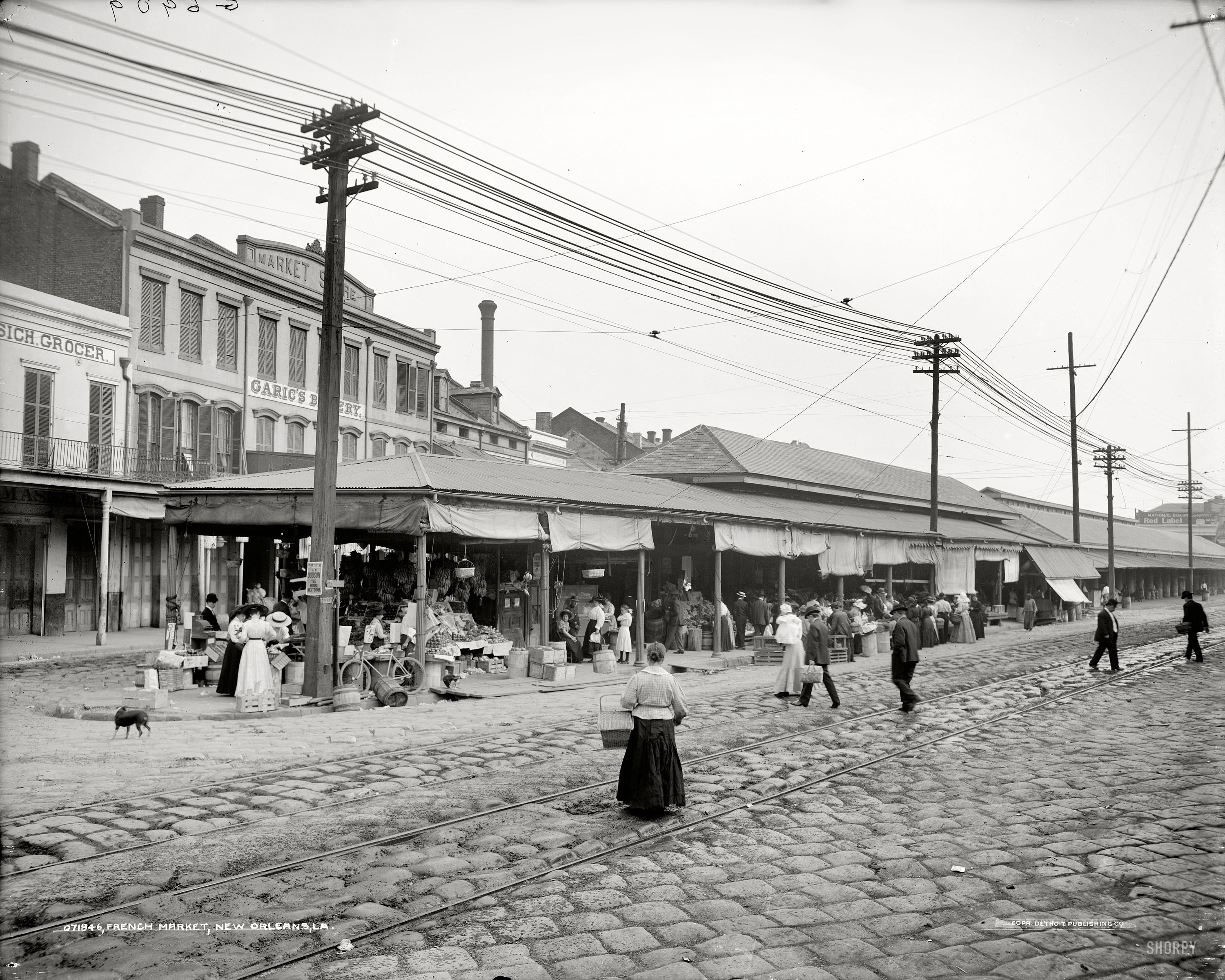
The French Market, 1910

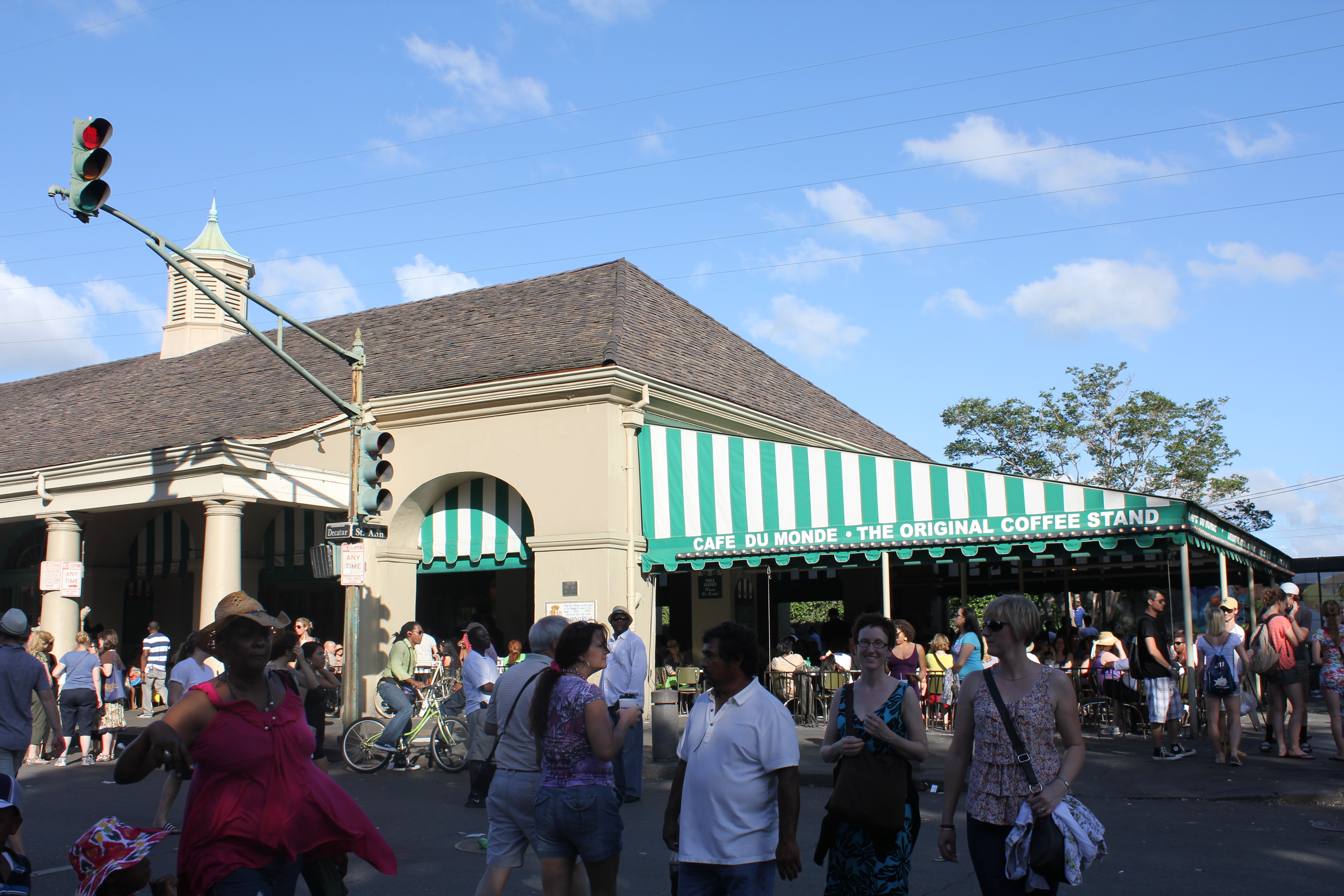
Cafe Du Monde

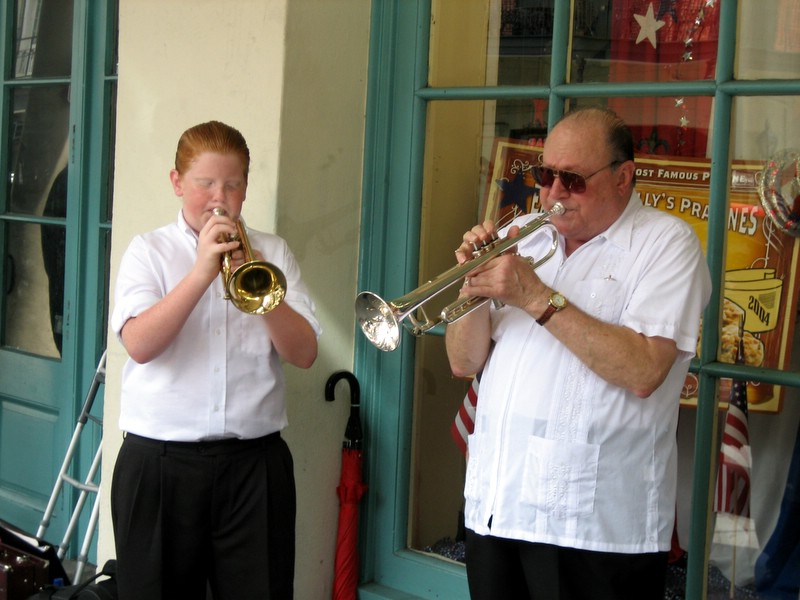
Street performers

== See also ==
- Café du Monde
- Jackson Square
