= Decatur Street (New Orleans) =

Street in New Orleans, Louisiana

Coordinates: 29.9611°N 90.0589°W

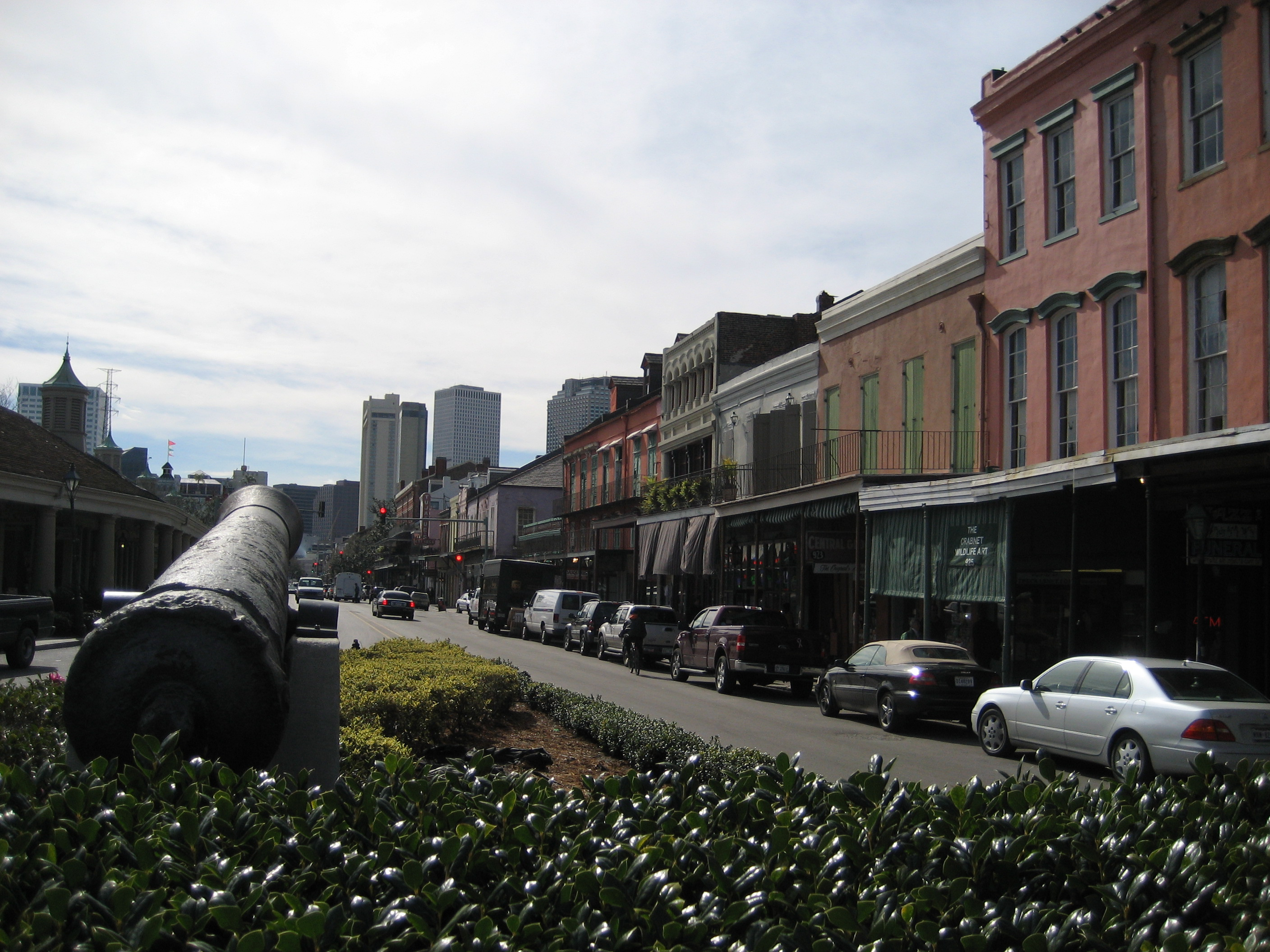
Looking up Decatur Street from the Joan of Arc monument

Decatur Street is a street in the French Quarter neighborhood of New Orleans, Louisiana, United States that runs parallel to the Mississippi River. Decatur was formerly known as "Levee Street" or Rue de la Levée, as it was originally the location of the levee. In 1870, when the river had altered its course, it was renamed "Decatur Street" for the naval officer Stephen Decatur Jr.

Decatur begins at Canal Street (the corresponding street up-river of Canal Street is Magazine), runs across the French Quarter, and terminates at St. Ferdinand Street in the Faubourg Marigny neighborhood.

== See also ==
- List of streets of New Orleans
