= Beignet =

French deep-fried doughnut

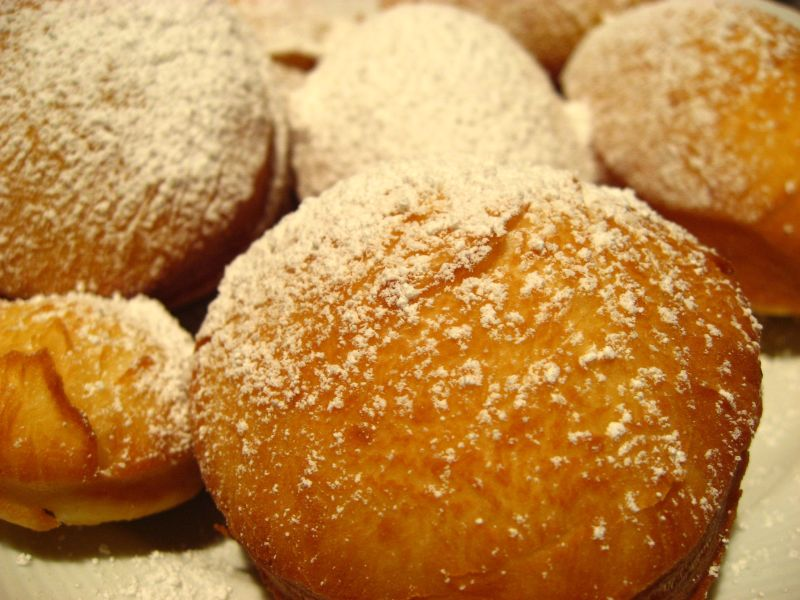
- Type: Doughnut
- Place of origin: France
- Main ingredients: Dough, powdered sugar
- Variations: Rice, yeast, pâte à choux

Beignet (/ˈbɛnjeɪ/ BEN-yay, also US: /beɪnˈjeɪ, bɛnˈjeɪ/ bayn-YAY, ben-YAY; French: [bɛɲɛ]; lit. 'bump') is a deep-fried pastry of French origin. It is commonly made from choux pastry, but can also be made using rice flour (rice beignets) or yeast-leavened batters. Beignets can be served in a variety of preparations, the most common being dusted with confectioner’s sugar. The pastry is popular in French, Hungarian, Italian, Cajun, and American cuisines.

== Types ==
A traditional way beignets are prepared is using choux pastry dough. Otherwise known as the French-style beignet, this type of dough is typically made using butter, eggs, milk or water, sugar, flour, and salt. Choux pastry is versatile and is prepared differently by culture. The pâte à choux method is also the style of beignets that were introduced to New Orleans by French immigrants in the 1700s.

Variations often include banana or plantain – popular fruits in the port city – or berries. Other variations include savory fillings such as meat and cheese fillings.

Beignets can also be made with yeast pastry, which might be referred to as boules de Berlin in French. This refers to Berliner doughnuts that are filled with fruit or jam.

In Corsica, beignets made with chestnut flour (beignets de farine de châtaigne) are known as fritelli.

In Canadian French, doughnuts are alternately referred to as beigne or beignet.

In former French colonial empire in West Africa, a beignet is a small ball of fried dough, in Senegal sometimes made with millet flour rather than wheat, equivalent to a puff-puff.

== Origins ==
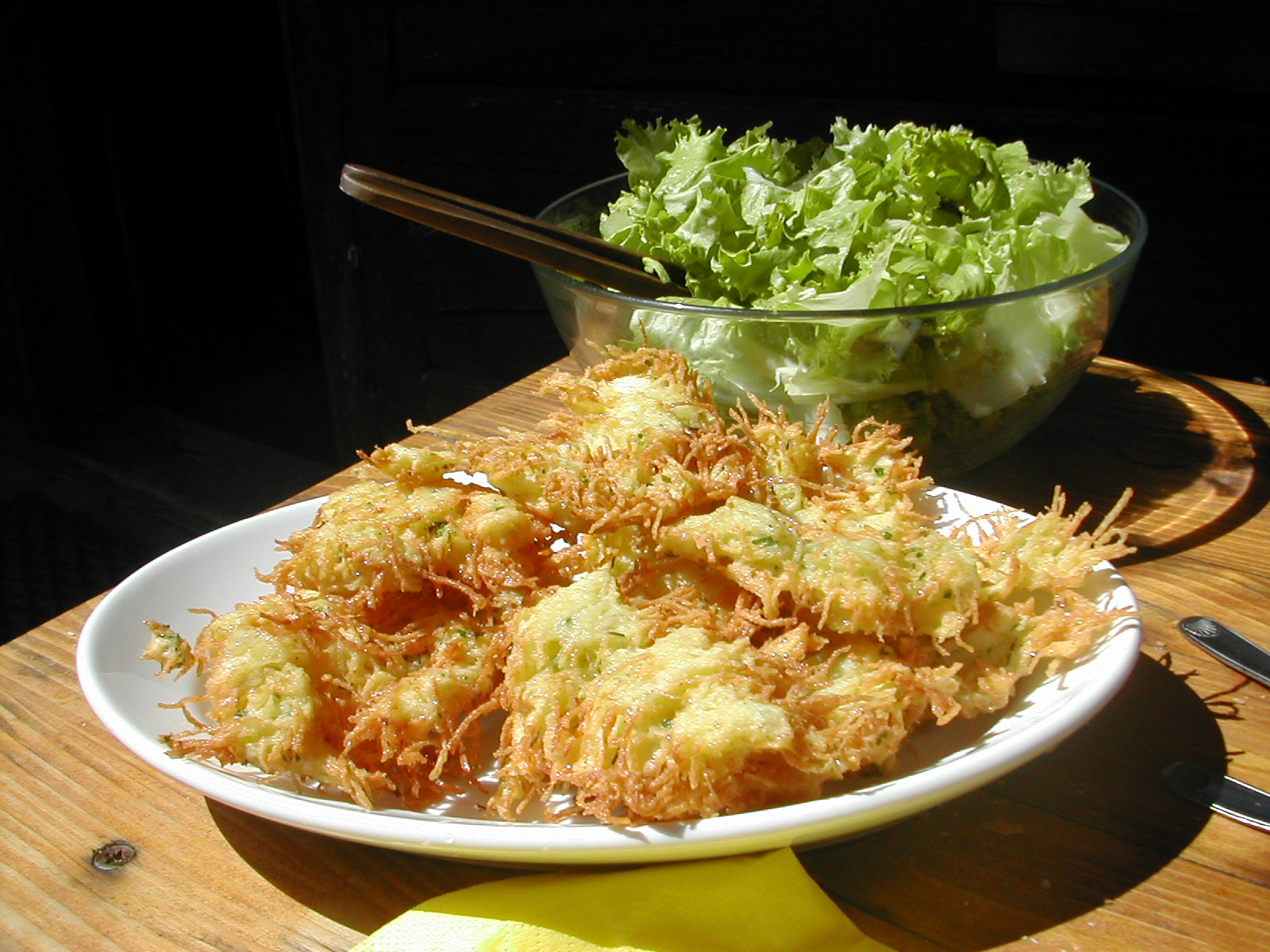
Beignets from Haute-Savoie

Variations of fried dough can be found across cuisines internationally. However, the origin of the term beignet is specifically French. They were brought to New Orleans in the 18th century by French colonists, from "the old mother country", as well as by Acadians, and became a large part of home-style Creole cooking.

Deep-fried yeast dough has been part of culinary tradition since at least the Middle Ages. The Spanish refer to this type of creation as "buñuelos", which likely shares etymology with the Celtic word for deep-fried yeast dough, "bigne".

== Louisiana ==
Preparing beignets in Café du Monde (New Orleans)

Louisiana-style beignets are generally square or rectangular shaped, and are made from leavened dough rather than choux pastry. In New Orleans, they are often consumed as a breakfast item served with powdered sugar on top. They are meant to be eaten immediately after frying and are served at several cafes in the New Orleans region.

In the United States, beignets have been popular within New Orleans Creole cuisine and may also be served as a dessert.

It is one of only two official state donuts in the U.S., the other being the Boston cream doughnut, the state donut of Massachusetts.

== Preparation ==
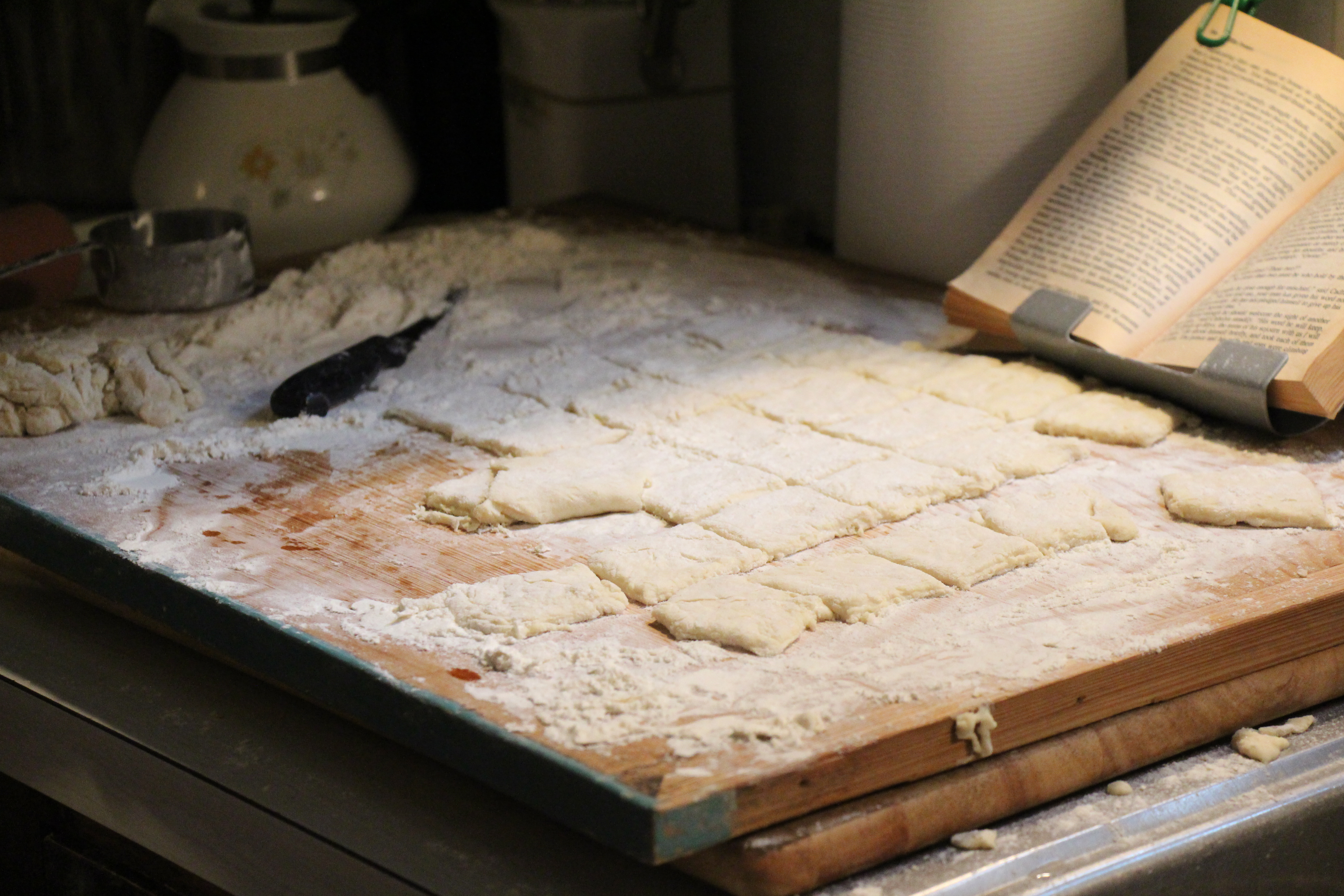
Beignets before frying

Ingredients used to prepare beignets typically include:

- Tepid water
- Granulated sugar
- Evaporated milk
- Bread flour
- Shortening
- Oil or lard, for deep-frying
- Confectioners' sugar
- Yeast (for leavened batters)

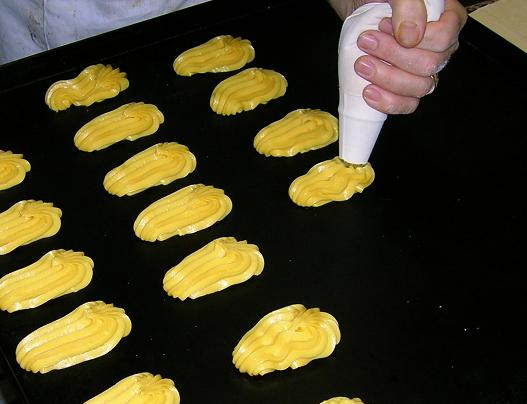
Piping choux pastry dough for beignets

Preparation varies by type. For yeast-leavened beignets, the ingredients are combined and a dough has formed, it is rolled out and then sliced into squares which are deep-fried for two to three minutes. The result is a puffy, golden brown pastry.

For choux pastry beignets, the chilled dough is piped or scooped before being fried in hot oil.

== See also ==
- Baursaki – Traditional fried dough of Central Asian and Middle Eastern cuisines
- Buñuelo – Spanish or Latin American fried dough fritters
- Churro – Fried-dough pastry
- Cuisine of New Orleans – Culinary traditions of New Orleans, Louisiana, US
- Fasnacht (doughnut) – Deep-fried Pennsylvania Dutch doughnut
- Lángos – Hungarian deep-fried flatbread
- List of choux pastry dishes
- List of doughnut varieties
- Lokma – Deep-fried dough pastries
- Mekitsa – Dish made of kneaded deep fried dough made with yogurt (Bulgarian)
- Puff-puff – African fried dough snack and pastry
- Sufganiyah – Round jelly-filled doughnut served at Hanukkah
- Zeppole – Italian doughnut
