= Las Posadas =

Christmas tradition in the Spanish-speaking world

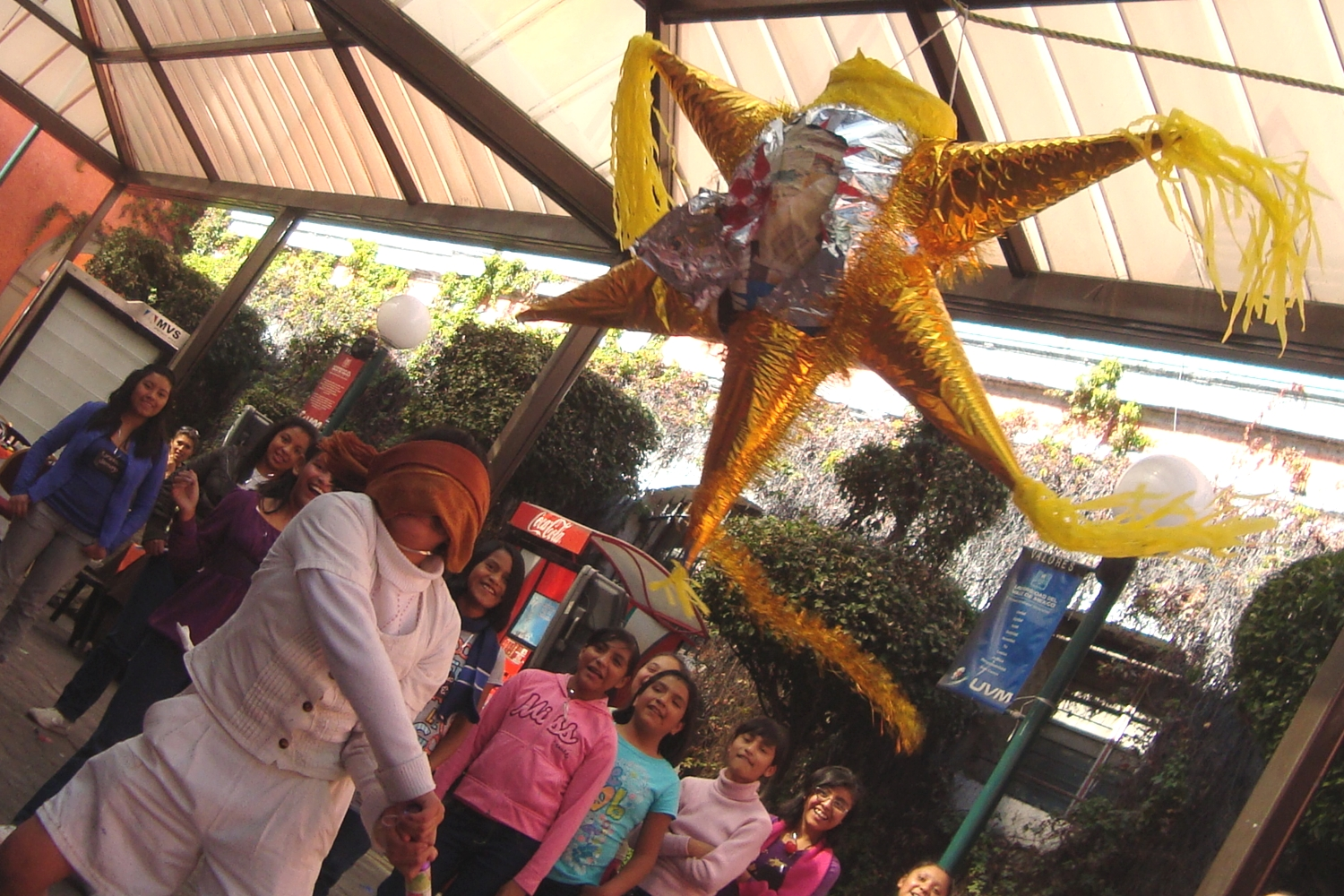
Children smashing a traditional star-shaped piñata in a pre-posada party in Mexico City

Las Posadas is a novenario (an extended devotional prayer). It is celebrated chiefly in Hispanic America (principally Mexico, Guatemala, El Salvador and Honduras) and by Hispanic American immigrants and their descendants in the United States. It is typically celebrated each year between December 16 and December 24. The Spanish-speaking countries countries have continued to celebrate the holiday, with very few changes to the tradition.

== Etymology ==
Las Posadas derives from the Spanish word posada (lodging, or accommodation) which, in this case, refers to the inn from the Nativity story. It uses the plural form as the celebration lasts for a nine-day interval (called the novena) during the Christmas season, which represents the nine-month pregnancy of Mary, the mother of Jesus Christ.

== History ==
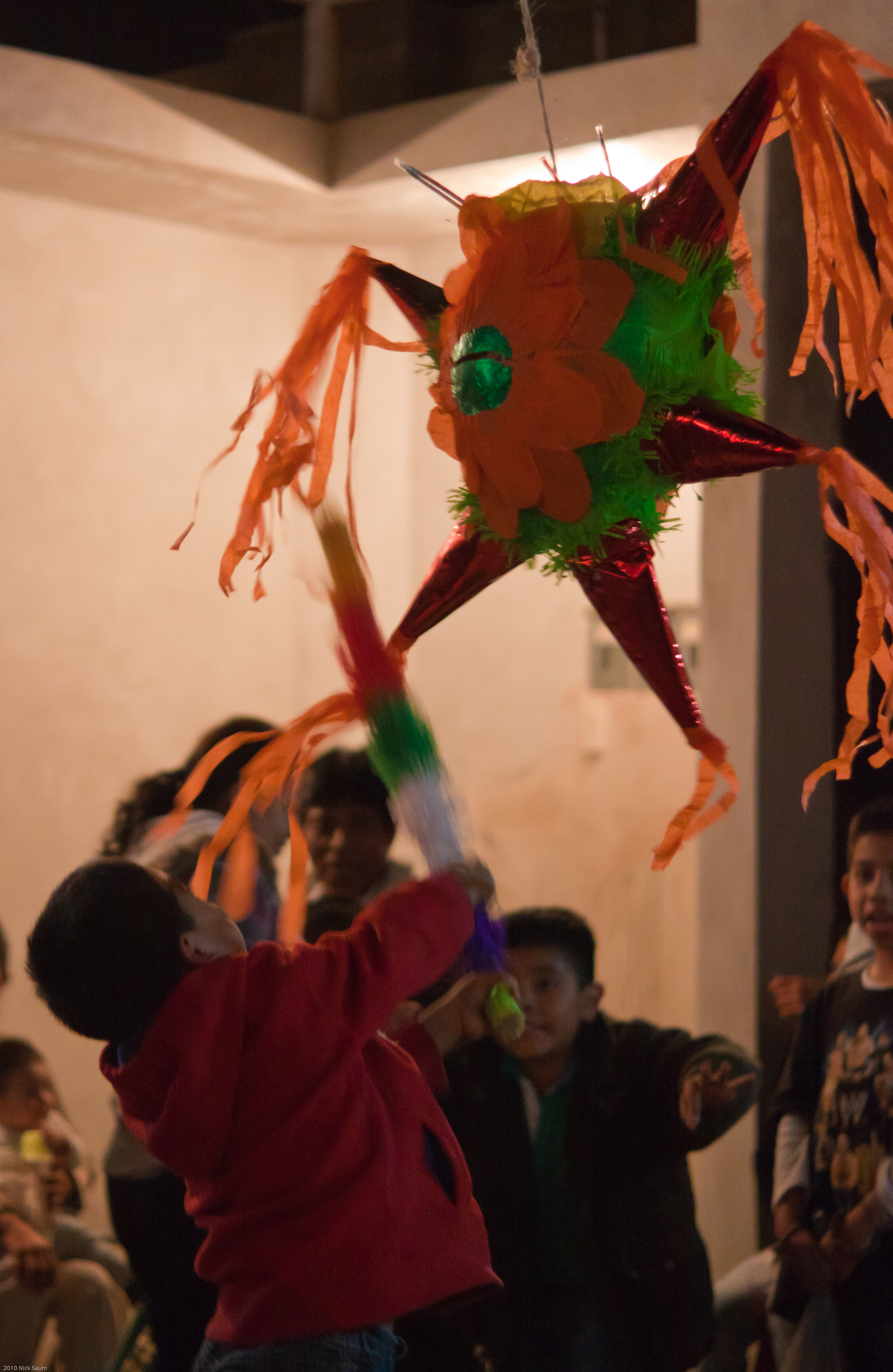
Children in Oaxaca, Mexico, celebrating Las Posadas

This celebration has been a Mexican tradition for over 430 years, starting in 1586. Many Mexican holidays include dramatizations of original events, a tradition which has its roots in the ritual of Bible plays used to teach religious doctrine to a largely illiterate population in 10th- and 11th-century Europe. The plays lost favor with the Church and were eventually banned as they became popular through the addition of folk music and other non-religious elements; they were reintroduced in the 16th century by two Spanish saints as the Christmas pageant—a new kind of religious ceremony to accompany the Christmas holiday.

The origins of Las Posadas are associated with the Augustinian friars of San Agustín de Acolman, near Mexico City. In 1586, Friar Diego de Soria obtained authorization from Pope Sixtus V to hold misas de aguinaldo (“Christmas gift masses”) between December 16 and 24. The observance, which began in churches, later spread to haciendas and private homes, taking on its modern form by the 19th century.

In Mexico, the winter solstice festival was one of the most important celebrations of the year that came on December 12 according to the Julian calendar used by the Spanish until 1582. According to the Aztec calendar, Tonantzin (the mother of the gods) was celebrated on the winter solstice, and she is still feted on December 12, while their most important deity, the sun god Huitzilopochtli, was born during the month of December (panquetzaliztli). The parallel in time between this native celebration and the celebration of Christmas lent itself to an almost-seamless merging of the two holidays. Seeing the opportunity to proselytize, Spanish missionaries brought the reinvented religious pageant to Mexico where they used it to teach the story of Jesus' birth. In 1586, Friar Diego de Soria obtained a Papal bull from Pope Sixtus V, stating that a Christmas mass should be observed throughout Mexico on the nine days preceding Christmas Day.

While its roots are in Catholicism, Protestant Latinos also follow the tradition.

In recent times, it has become popular to call any non-religious party celebrated in December, a posada. Schools and workplaces typically call posada to their Christmas/Holiday/end-of-the-year party. This has prompted protests from Catholic groups against the indiscriminate use of the term.

== Re-enactment ==
Two people dress up as Mary and Joseph and certain houses are designated to be "inns"; the head of the procession carries a candle inside a paper shade. The actors travel to one house each night for nine nights. At each house, the resident responds by singing a song and the pair are recognized and allowed to enter; the group of guests come into the home and kneel around the Nativity scene to pray (typically, the Rosary). The final location may be a church instead of a home.

Individuals may play the various parts of Mary (María) and Joseph (José), with the expectant mother riding a real donkey, attendants such as angels and shepherds joining along the way, or pilgrims who may carry images of the holy personages instead, while children may carry poinsettias. The procession is followed by musicians, with the entire procession singing posadas such as pedir posada. At the end of each night, Christmas carols are sung, children break open star-shaped piñatas and everyone sits for a feast. The piñatas used during the holiday are traditionally made out of clay.

== Regional variations ==
One event in Portland, Oregon, finishes with Santa Claus and Christmas gifts donated to needy children.

A large procession has been held since 1966 along the San Antonio River Walk. It traverses large landmarks in San Antonio, Texas, including the Arneson River Theater, Museo Alameda, and the Spanish Governor's Palace, ending at the Cathedral of San Fernando.

In the Philippines, the tradition of Las Posadas is illustrated by the Panunulúyan pageant; sometimes it is performed immediately before the Misa de Gallo (Midnight Mass) and sometimes on each of the nine nights. The main difference, compared to Mexico, is that actors are used for Mary and Joseph instead of statues and sing the requests for accommodation. The lines of the "innkeepers" are also often sung, but sometimes these respond without singing. Another difference is that the lyrics are not in Spanish but in a Philippine language.

In Colombia, Venezuela, and Ecuador, families and friends gather from the 16th to the 24th of December to pray the Novena de Aguinaldos.

== See also ==
- Christmas in Mexico
- Simbang Gabi
