= Novena =

Devotional prayer in Christianity lasting nine days or weeks

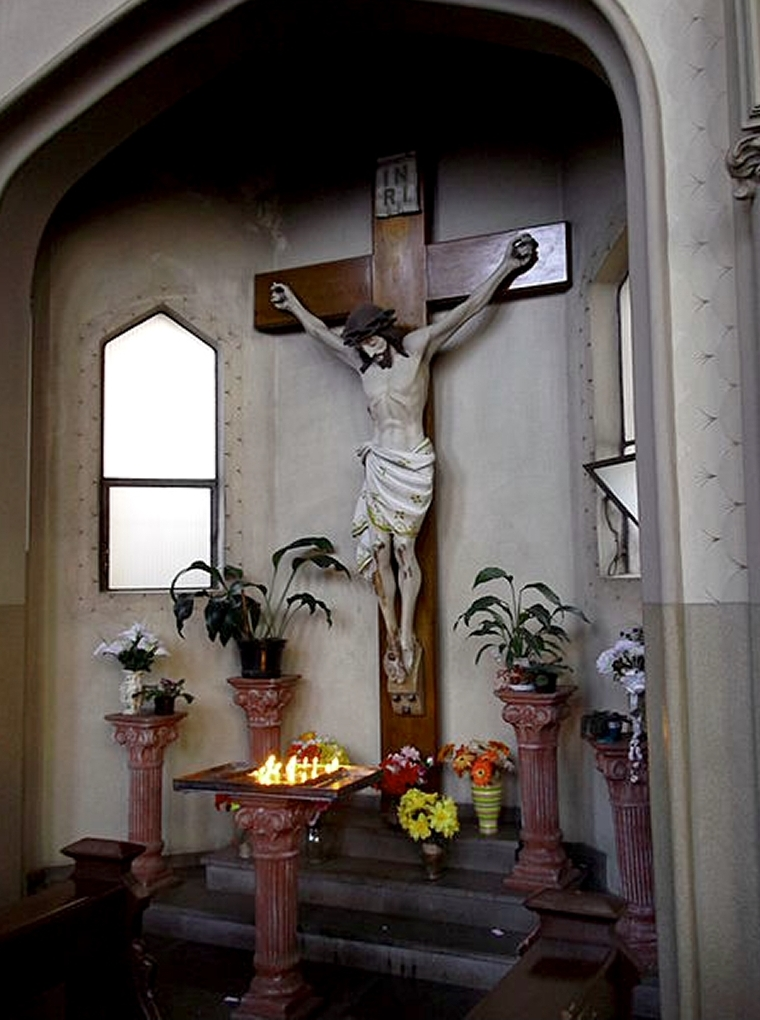
Novena to Our Lady of Perpetual Help in Brazil

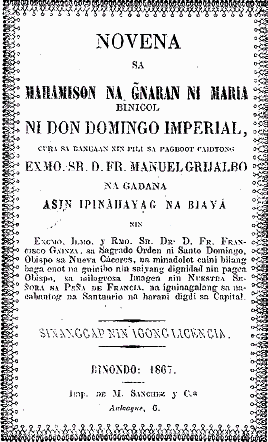
A booklet of the novena to Sweetest Name of Mary, in Bikol and printed in Binondo, Manila dated 1867

A novena (from Latin: novem, "nine") is an ancient tradition of devotional praying in Christianity, consisting of private or public prayers repeated for nine successive days or weeks. The nine days between the Feast of the Ascension and Pentecost, when the disciples gathered in the Upper Room and devoted themselves to prayer, is often considered to be the first novena.

In some Christian communities, such as in Africa, Latin America and the Philippines, novena traditions are popular and include devotional rituals such as liturgies, congregational prayers, the decoration of statues, hymns and music, processions, as well as communal feasting.

Novenas are most often prayed by members of the Catholic Church, but also by Lutherans, Anglicans, and Eastern Orthodox Christians; they have been used in ecumenical Christian settings as well. The prayers are often derived from devotional prayer books, or consist of the recitation of the rosary (a "rosary novena"), or of short prayers through the day. Novena prayers are customarily printed in small booklets, and are often dedicated to a specific angel, saint, Marian title of the Blessed Virgin Mary, or one of the persons of the Holy Trinity.

== History ==
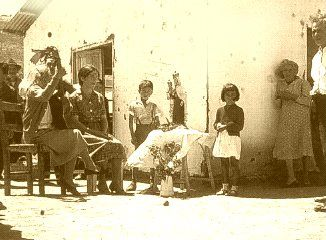
Novena likely has roots in ancient funeral-related rituals. Above: a group gathered for a novena to Our Lady of Mount Carmel, most likely a mourning event (c. 1940).

The word Novena is rooted in the Latin word for nine. The practice of the novena is based in early Christianity, where Masses were held for nine days with devotional prayers for the deceased. The practice may trace its origins to an early Greek and Roman custom performed by families, consisting of nine days of mourning after the death of a loved one, followed by a feast, which originally prompted Catholic writers such as Augustine of Hippo, Pseudo-Alcuin and John Beleth to warn Christians not to emulate the custom.

Over time, members of the Roman Catholic faith began to associate novena with Christian themes such as the nine months Jesus spent in the womb, the giving-up of His spirit at the ninth hour during the crucifixion, and the nine days that passed between the Ascension of Jesus and the descent of the Holy Spirit on the first Christians at Pentecost. In the New Testament, this biblical event is often quoted from Acts of the Apostles, 1:12–2:5. The Church Fathers also assigned special meaning to the number nine, seeing it as symbolic of imperfect man turning to God in prayer, due to its proximity with the number ten, symbolic of perfection and God.

=== Papal recognition ===
The practice of novena grew by the Middle Ages to include pious prayers for nine days before a feast in honor of a saint identified on a liturgical calendar. By the 11th century, the novena practice had become a means in Christianity of praying to petition spiritual or personal favor through a saint, such as the Virgin Mary. After the Protestant Reformation and Counter-Reformation, the Catholic Church formally permitted novenas, in particular through the papal approvals of a large number of novenas by Pope Pius IX.

In the Roman Catholic Church, there are three recognized categories of novenas, though this distinction is not exclusive:

- Mourning, or before a burial;
- In preparation for a Church feast; the revised Enchiridion Indulgentiarum assigns indulgenced novenas to particular feasts: "A partial indulgence is granted to the faithful, who devoutly take part in the pious exercises of a public novena before the feast of Christmas or Pentecost or the Immaculate Conception of the Blessed Virgin Mary."
- Intercessory (for a particular request).

By standard liturgical norms, novenas may be performed in church, at home, or anywhere where solemn prayers are appropriate, though some indulgenced novenas require church attendance. Sometimes, a special candle or incense is lit at the beginning of the novena which burns during the nine days of prayer.

The first chapter of the General Principles of Sacrosanctum Concilium, #13, of the Second Vatican Council (1962–1965) sought to give guidance on the place of novenas in Christian piety:

Devotions should be so drawn up that they harmonize with the liturgical seasons, accord with the sacred liturgy, are in some fashion derived from it, and lead the people to it, since, in fact, the liturgy by its very nature far surpasses any of them.

Within the Roman Catholic tradition, novena prayers typically include a praise of Jesus Christ, the Virgin Mary or another saint, and a personal petition. Novenas have been a widespread practice in Catholic history. Novena prayers are also practised by Lutheran, Orthodox and Anglican Christians, who hold close or similar beliefs regarding its pious practice. In addition, novenas have also been used in an ecumenical Christian context, such as those promulgated by Premier Christian Radio, in order to pray for Church renewal.

== Practices ==
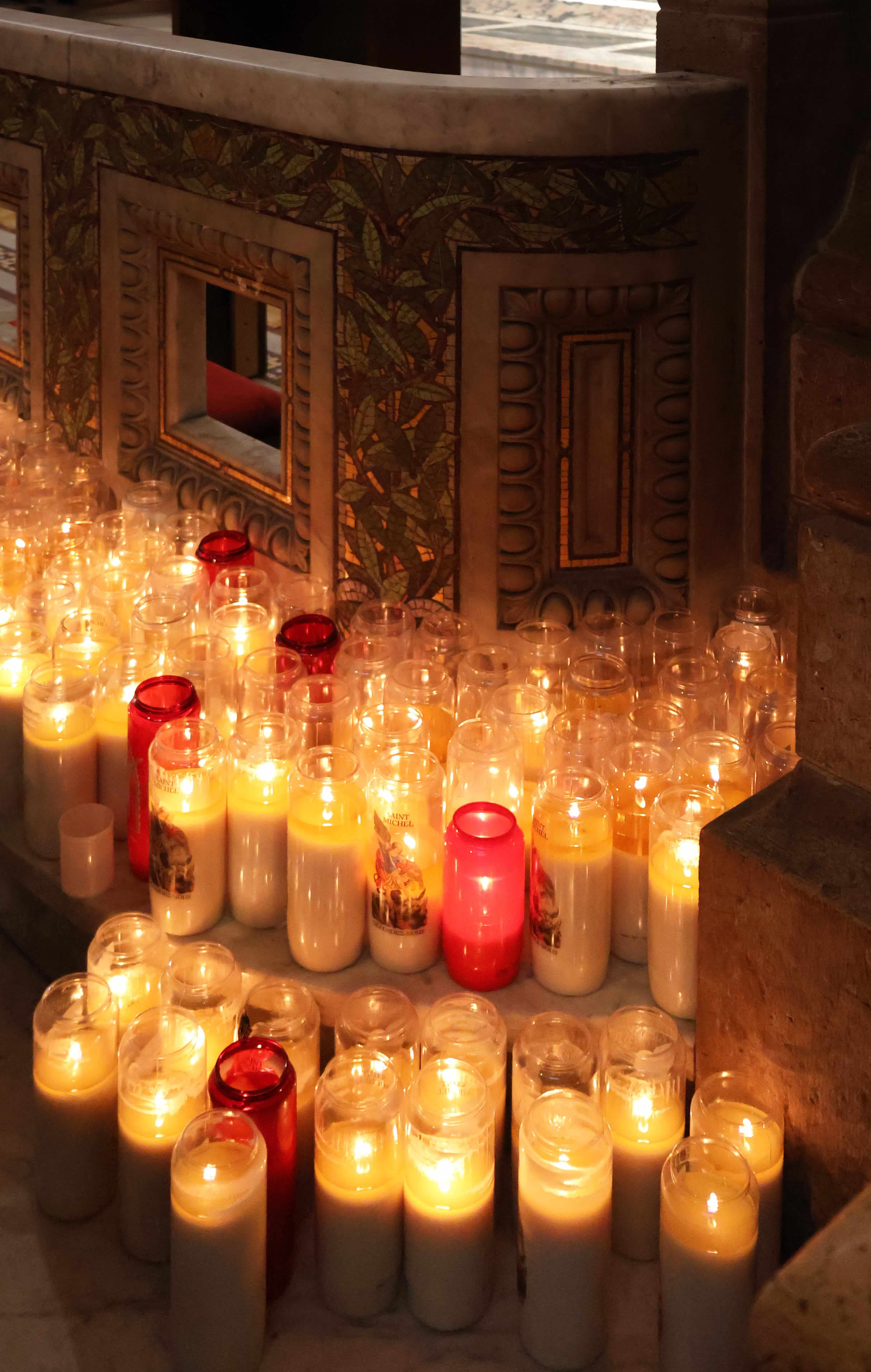
Novena candles in the Sacré-Cœur, Paris

A novena is a ritualistic devotional worship where one or more Christian devotees make petitions, implore favors, or obtain graces by honoring Jesus Christ, Virgin Mary or the saints of the faith who are believed to empower divine intervention. According to Professor Fenella Cannell, a Novena is "a supplicatory act of worship".

A novena may be made at any time. The devotion of the Nine First Fridays in honor of the Sacred Heart is a novena. Some parishes conduct a perpetual novena where the prayers particular to a specific novena are recited weekly.

Other novenas are traditionally held in preparation for a particular feast day.

- The novena to the Holy Spirit is held between Ascension Thursday and Pentecost in commemoration of when the disciples gathered in the upper room and devoted themselves to prayer; it is considered the first novena. There are a number of ways to pray the Pentecost Novena. One might pray the Evening Prayer from the Liturgy of the Hours each day, the "Come, Holy Spirit" or other prayers.
- The Novena to the Holy Trinity generally includes the Gloria Patri, although the other prayers may be used.
- There are a variety of Christmas novenas. The Saint Andrew's Christmas novena is made from the feast of Saint Andrew (November 30) through Christmas Eve with the novena prayer said fifteen times daily. Las Posadas is a novena celebrated chiefly in some Latin American countries, such as Mexico, Guatemala, Cuba, and by Hispanics in the United States. Colombians also celebrate a novena in the nine days leading to Christmas, known as the novena of aguinaldos. It is typically celebrated each year between December 16 and December 24.
- The novena in honor of the Infant Jesus of Prague is often said at Christmastide. The Feast of the Holy Name of Jesus is the principal feast of the miraculous Infant. In the Czech Republic the statue is ceremoniously paraded through the streets of Prague annually on May 27, with prayers and songs.
- A novena to Saint Joseph is commonly made on the nine first Wednesdays before his feast day (March 19 and May 1) or on the nine days before the feast.
- Franciscan friaries customarily hold a novena of nine (or thirteen) Tuesdays (or nine consecutive days) in honor of Anthony of Padua before his feast day of June 13.
- The novena to Saint Jude and the novena to Saint Peregrine, the patron saint of cancer patients, each begin nine days before their feast days, but can be prayed in a particular time of need as well.

== Regional customs ==
=== Africa ===
Novena practices were introduced into communities by Christian missionaries in their colonial era and postmodern era evangelization efforts in Africa, as well as new world plantation colonies where African slaves were settled such as in Brazil. These initiatives brought a sense of socioreligious community.

Some practices are unique to Africa. Various denominations of Christianity in Africa have introduced regional novena practices that include devotional prayers, singing, and clap, wave, or shout offerings. The novena devotionalism in Ghana includes on each of the nine nights, after the loud prayers, the blood-covering of Jesus, where the devotees stain themselves considering it to be symbolism for the blood of Christ.

Among the coastal West African Christian communities, novena is a means of petitioning God through worship and fasting, along with traditional rituals. Syncretic new age religious practices in Nigeria have adopted the nine days of novena prayer ritualism. In Zimbabwe, according to Lawrence Daka – a professor and a Zimbabwean Jesuit:

Their [Catholic clergy] healing sessions are theatric, hysterical, loud and really engaging to the extent that some people fall to the ground and others feel the power of God piercing through their bodies. Some of the strong willed Catholics have taken up Novena after Novena seeking divine intervention in a sickness or misfortune. In short, there is a great yearning and thirsting for a religion that delivers quick answers to people’s problems which range from misfortunes to dealing with illness and death.

— The Church and the Challenges of the Healing Ministry in Zimbabwe, May 2015

=== Europe and North America ===
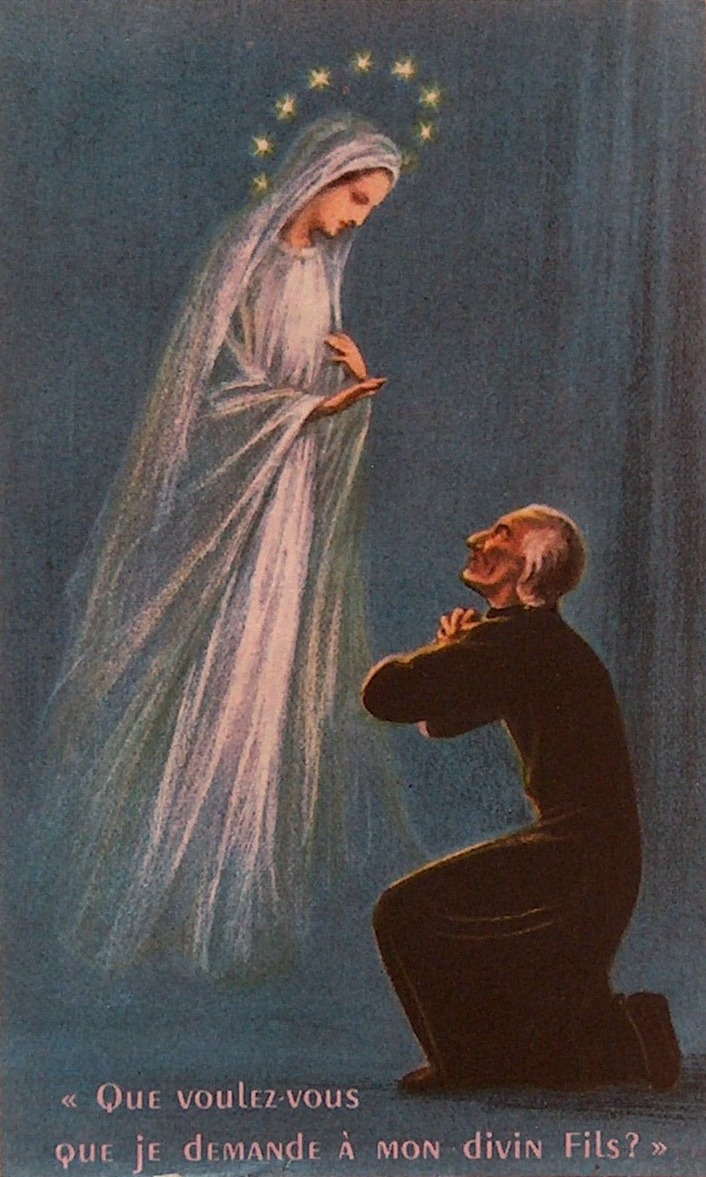
A Marian novena wall painting in France, with tagline: "What do you want me to ask to My divine Son?"

Devotional and paraliturgical novenas have been common in Europe as well as with European settlers in North America. These have included public worship such as Mass and private praying with religious items such as a rosary and images particularly related to the Virgin Mary. According to James M. O'Toole, a professor specializing in American Catholic history, the period between World War I and mid-1950s were the "heyday of American Catholic devotionalism".

This period witnessed novena devotionalism along with popularity of sodalities, confraternities, devotion to saints, meatless Fridays, holy cards, rosary, cross and eucharistic practices. O'Toole says that these provided a sense of communal identification, particularly in a time of mass migration. The novena had strong roots in ethnic neighborhoods, and devotional worship had sociopolitical links, offering a sense of communal security through religious symbols in a period of uncertainty and fear. As economic prosperity and a sense of national solidarity grew in and after the 1960s, the novena ritualism waned and the participation in church worship services fell.

In Eastern and Central Europe, novena practices continue. During the communist era, the devout orthodox Christians in the former Yugoslavia organized the Great Novena under the statue of Virgin Mary, to resist the state enforced atheism, to maintain the freedom to practice religion, and to re-assert the Christian legacy of the region, particularly in Croatia.

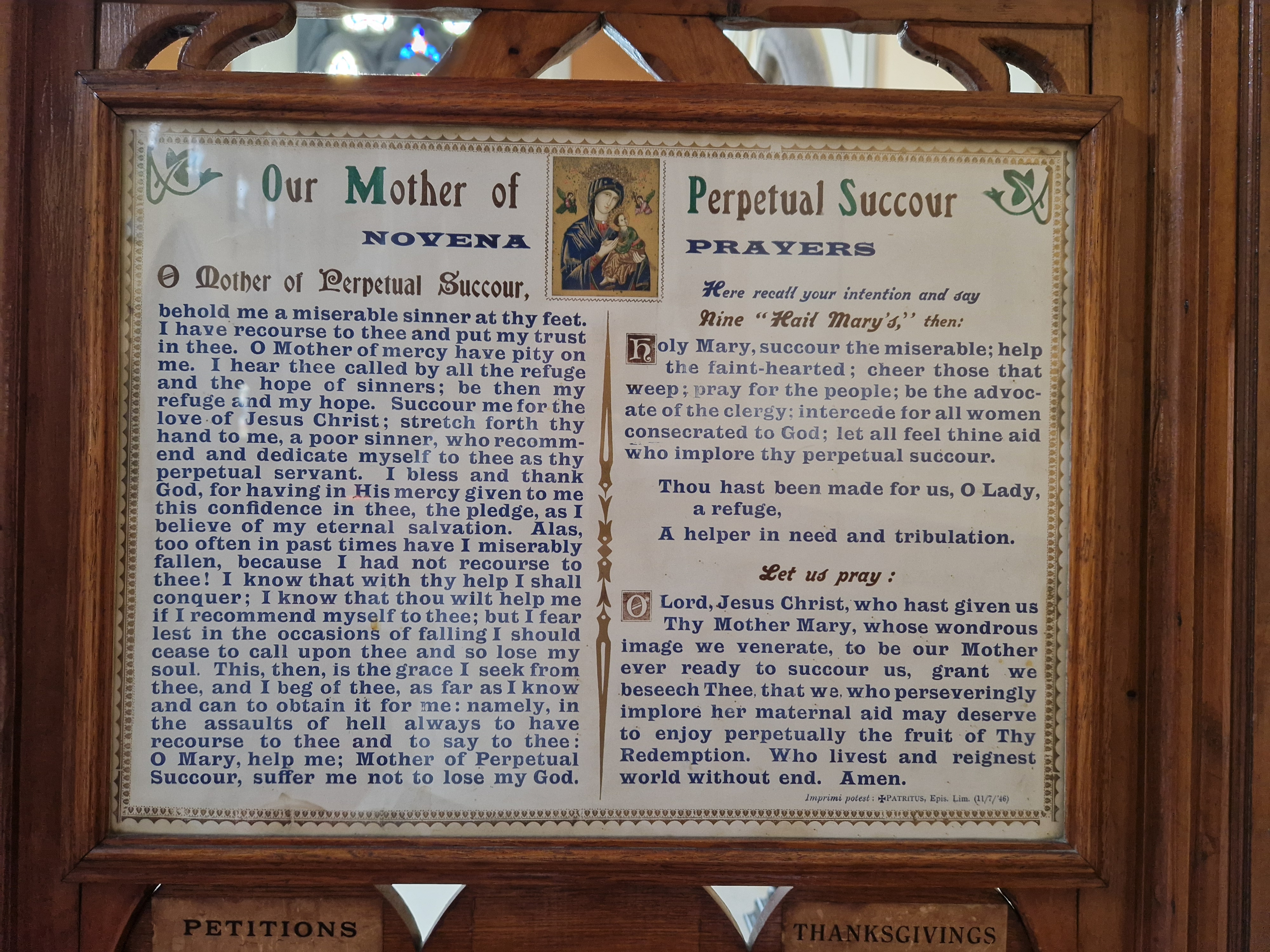
A novena prayer to Our Lady of Perpetual Succour in an Irish church

In Catholic Ireland, states Professor Gladys Ganiel, devotional practices such as novenas have been popular. The cultural acceptance of devotional worship has been historically high, and those Irish who themselves do not perform novenas, nevertheless respect those who do. Some of their Catholic ritual practices were repressed by the British state during the 18th and 19th centuries, but repression and criticism only increased the resolve of the Irish to persist in their ways of practicing their faith.

A 1921 survey in the Bulletin of the University of Notre Dame states that novena prayers were popular, and particularly common among students during examinations, or illness, or after the death of a fellow student. The Novena-Seance remain popular in many regions of the United States, such as among the Roman Catholics of Louisiana, where novenas are dedicated to Saint Jude and the Virgin Mary. These novenas are prayers believed to create a contact between the saint and the devotee, and thereby invoke divine intervention in whatever problem or anxiety is important to the devotee.

=== Latin America ===
The novena has been an important part of Christianity in the Caribbean and Latin America, both among the native Indian communities who converted to Christianity under the colonial Spanish or Portuguese rule, as well as the diverse communities that formed anew from millions of slaves and indentured laborers brought to the Americas from different parts of Africa and Asia. The devotional prayers are dedicated to statues of Jesus Christ, Madonna and various saints. They are also a part of velorio (wake) after the death of someone, which includes nine nights of novena (rezos de los nueve días).

According to Patrick Taylor and Frederick Case, attendance at Christian religious services has been low, except after the death of a loved one or a significant socio-political individual, and during times of difficulty such as epidemics or a drought. Many perform devotional worship with rosaries within their home before images of Christ and the Christian saints at a small dedicated altar within their living spaces. Like proselytism in Africa and Asia, missionaries of various denominations of Christianity, including Protestantism, have championed novenas in Hispanic-Latino communities as a part of their efforts to attract new converts to their ministries.

Colombians celebrate a novena in the nine days leading to Christmas, known as the novena of aguinaldos.

=== India ===
Novenas are still a common sight in India, especially in the state of Kerala. They are practised by Roman Catholics and oriental Catholics (e.g. Syro-Malabar Christians and Syro-Malankara Christians) and by the Orthodox Christians (Malankara Orthodox Christians and Jacobite Orthodox Christians). Novenas are common to Mother Mary (recited every Saturday), Saint George (common by the Orthodox and recited every Wednesday), Saint Jude (recited every Thursday), Saint Antony (recited every Tuesday) and others.

=== Philippines ===
Novena rites in Filipino churches

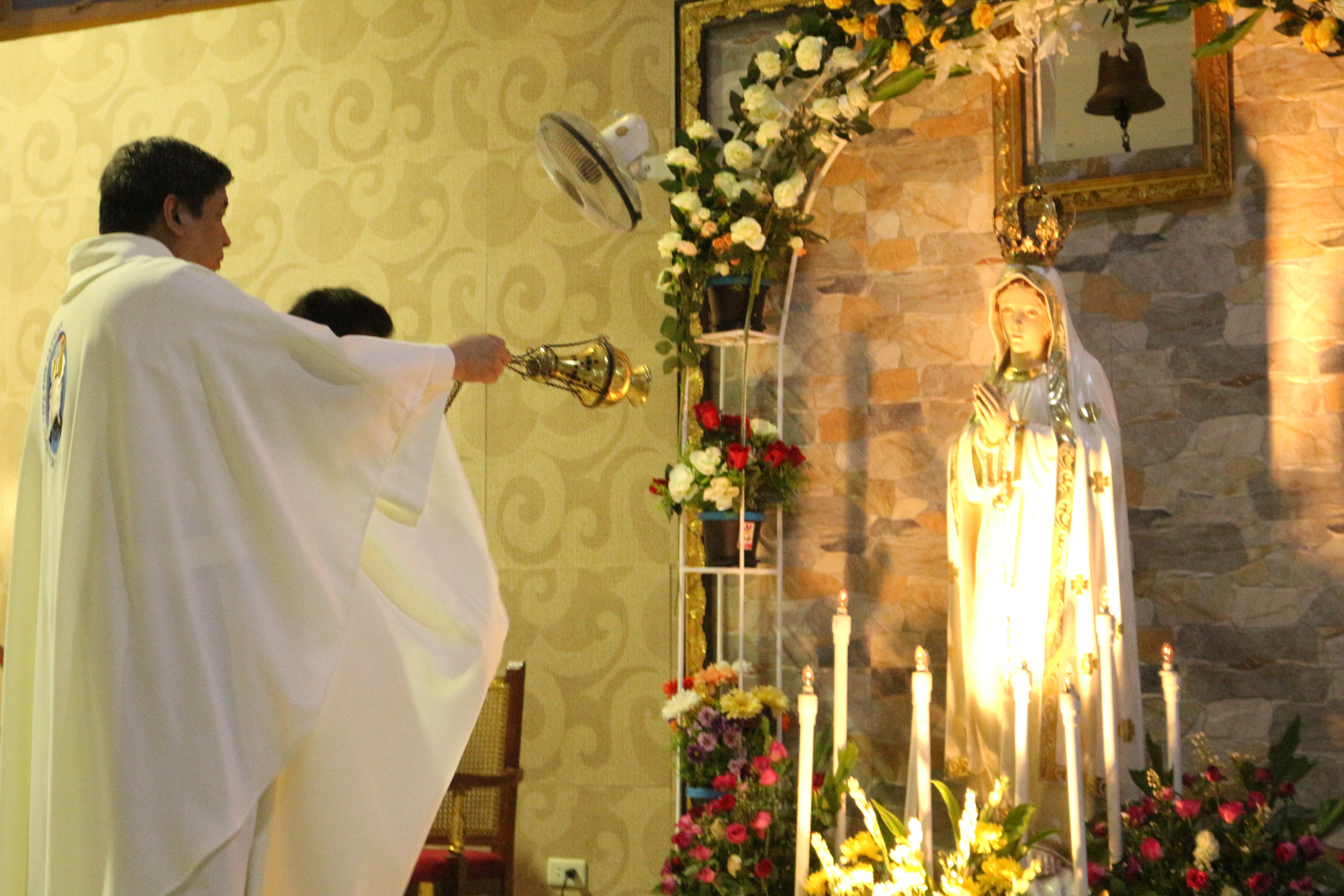
Novena to Our Lady of Fátima

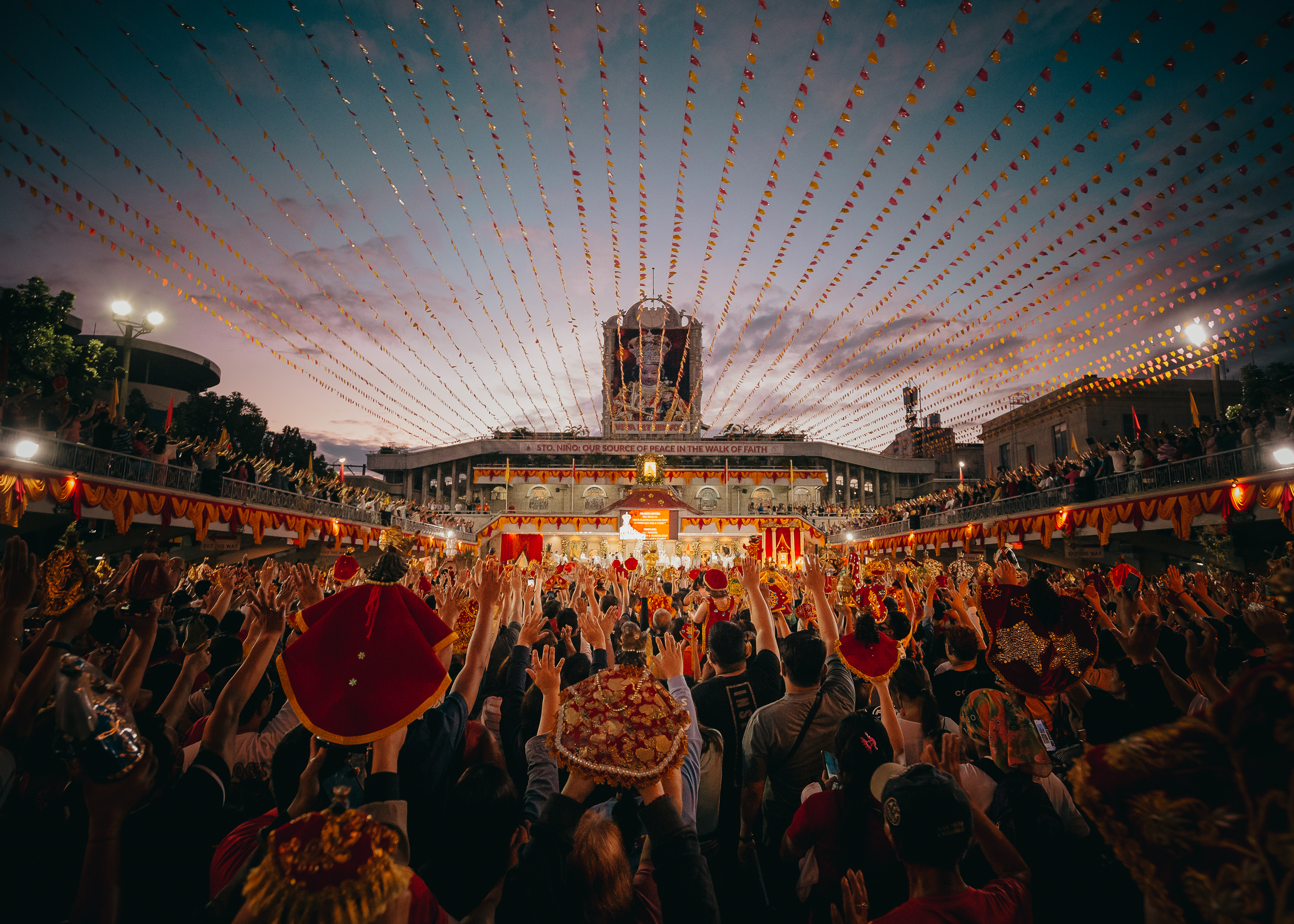
Novena to Santo Niño de Cebú

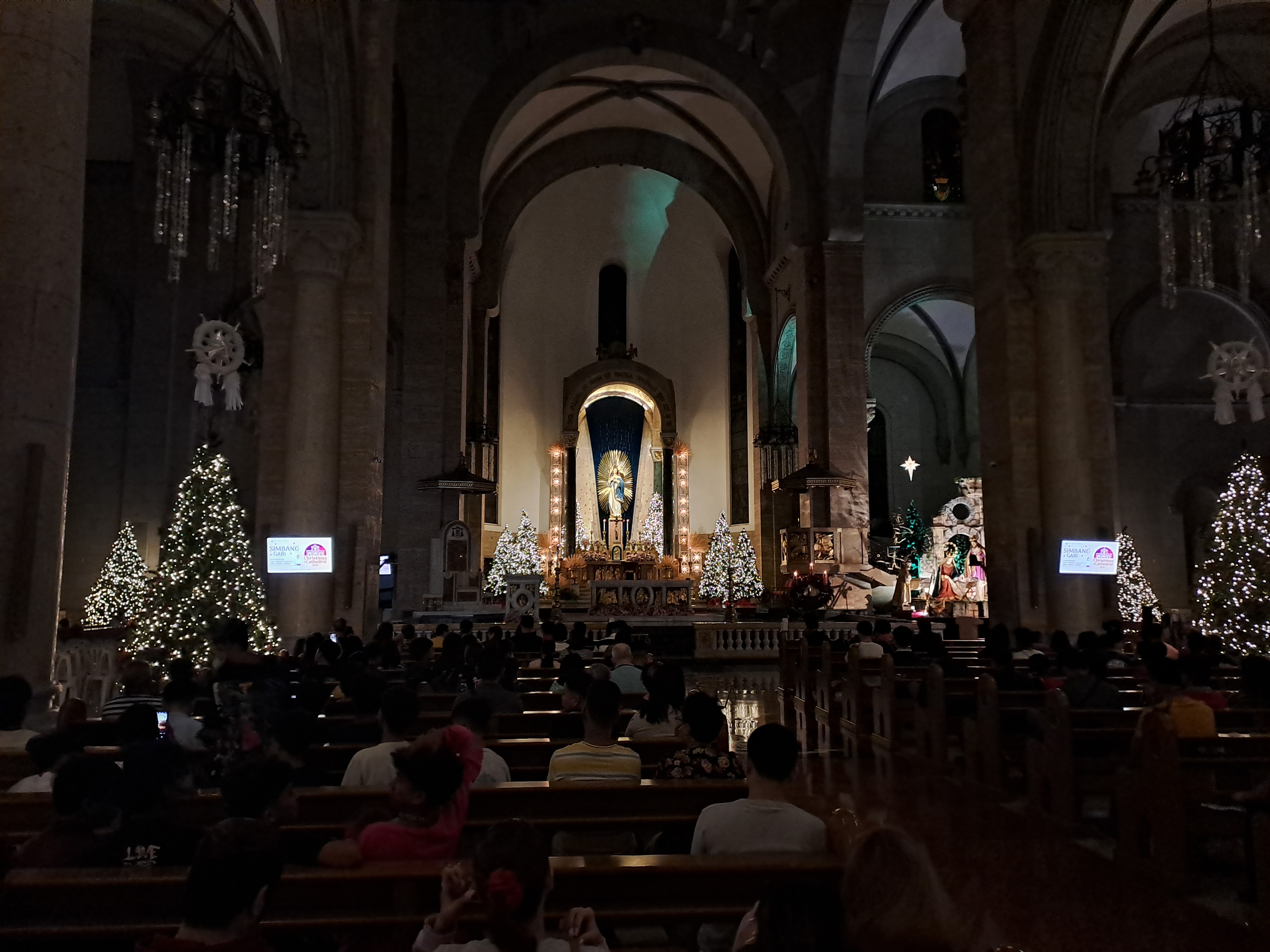
Simbang Gabi at the Manila Cathedral

In Christian communities of the Philippines and Latin America, novena traditions include devotional rituals in front of an altar, with nine levels where the Holy Cross is placed at the top. These are lit up with candles, decorated with flowers and other ritual items. Additionally, the space may have many statues decorated, and these statues typically include those of Virgin Mary, Apostles and saints of regional significance. The first day, the votive candles are placed on level one, and with each day the candles are raised by one level towards the Holy Cross. Further, each day includes congregational prayers, hymn singing with music, private and public devotionals. Some novenas include, sometimes on the last day, community fiesta events over beverages, refreshments or processions.

The novena is also linked to funerary rituals. Among Filipino Catholics, the Rosary Novena is a common practice where the prayer is recited for nine days, often beginning the day of someone's death, and formal funeral services timed to any time until the ninth day. Elsewhere, the day of the funeral and interment is timed to local customary practices, while the novena is continued at the home of the deceased or elsewhere.

Novenas remain a popular devotional practice in the Philippines. It is observed, for example, in the Simbang Gabi immediately preceding Christmas. The tradition of parol lanterns is also associated with the Christmas novena procession and the accompanying Panunulúyan pageant. In Pampanga, Christmas novenas were known as Lubenas or Lubenas Pascu.

It is also celebrated in the novena preceding the Feast of the Santo Niño de Cebú (Holy Child) on the third Sunday of January. The first nine days are marked with prayers, petitions and singing. During the main procession in Cebu City, the Santo Niño image is taken through the streets, with many people carrying their own replicas, decorated according to their own tastes. In Loboc, Bohol, the most popular novena is dedicated to a Black Madonna statue, with each service called the Gozos, which includes a chanting of praises to the Virgin in Spanish and Visayan, dancing, choir recitals, and a feast with fireworks on the last day.

In Metro Manila, popular novenas to Our Lady of Perpetual Help, Saint Jude Thaddeus, and the Black Nazarene are assigned to the last three days of the working week. Each novena is associated with a particular shrine, all of which have been approved by the Holy See. Some organizations have also begun offering the novena rituals online for devotees.

The Novena to Our Mother of Perpetual Help is observed for nine consecutive Wednesdays in Baclaran. The Saint Jude novena on Thursdays invokes the apostle's status as the patron saint of lost causes, and is popular with students taking examinations. The Black Nazarene novena held on Fridays marks the journey of Christ with the cross to his crucifixion. The image, novena, and associated devotional practices have a large following. In 2011, over six million Catholic devotees flocked to the Black Nazarene procession in Manila alone.

=== Melanesia ===
In 19th century Melanesia, the Christian clergy linked the end of epidemics, such as the measles of 1860, and credited the survival of the communities after major disasters to the dedicated and great outburst of prayers to Christian icons, to "fervent novena". Similarly, the Black Madonna novenas in Luboc started after similar crediting by the Christian clergy that the island community survived after a severe epidemic of cholera because they made devotional prayers to the Virgin Mary (Madonna) during their time of suffering.

== See also ==
- Novenas in anticipation of Christmas:
  - Las Posadas
  - Simbang Gabi
  - Novena of aguinaldos
- Novena of Grace
- Novena to Our Mother of Perpetual Help
- Octave (liturgy), Triduum
- Bartolo Longo (author of the 54-Days Novena)

== Citations ==
Attribution

== General bibliography ==
- Barbara Calamari & Sandra DiPasqua, Novena, Penguin Studio, 1999. ISBN 0-670-88444-8.
- Right Reverend Monsignor Joseph F. Stedman, The New Revised 'Triple' Novena Manual, Confraternity of the Precious Blood, 1975.
