= Novena of aguinaldos =

Christmas season novena

Novena of aguinaldos, also known as the novena to Baby Jesus, is a novena (nine-day religious ceremony) held during the time leading up to Christmas, from December 16 to December 24. The novena of aguinaldos is commonly celebrated by Catholics in Colombia, Peru, as well as parts of Ecuador and Venezuela. During each night of the novena, families and friends pray, eat, and sing villancicos together, often accompanied by musical instruments.

After the novena, typical Christmas dishes are served such as buñuelos, natilla, empanadas, hot chocolate, and sabajón, which is a Colombian-style spiked eggnog.

A similar tradition in Mexico and Central America is known as Las Posadas that occurs during the same nine days.

== History ==
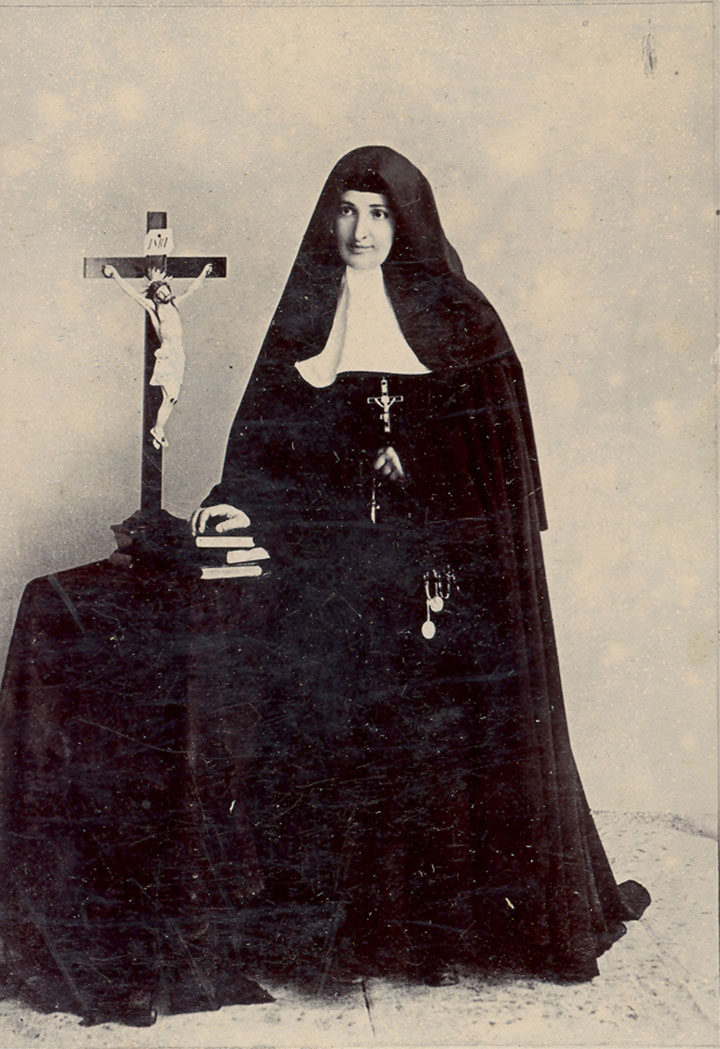
Mother María Ignacia, who modified the text of the novena in the end of the 19th century.

The novena of aguinaldos prayers were created by Fray Fernando Larrea Jesus, born in Quito, Ecuador in 1700, who after his ordination in 1725 was a preacher in Ecuador and Colombia. Fray Fernando wrote them at the request of the founder of the School of Teaching in Bogotá, Mrs. Clemencia Caycedo Jesus Velez. They were first published in 1743.

Many years later, a nun in the 1800s from the same Catholic school, Sister María Ignacia, modified the novena of aguinaldos. She added "Los Gozos," which is best described as a couplet of the aspirations for the coming of the Christ Child. "Los Gozos" are the verses that all participants pray at the end of the daily and the specific day prayers. This is the generally the part of the novena where people sing and play instruments, such as guitar, piano, or harp.

In many towns and neighborhoods, priests call upon their communities to gather at church to pray the novena, which includes participants dressed up as Joseph, Mary, baby Jesus and the animals that are included in the nativity.

== The prayers ==
The novena of aguinaldos is prayed for nine days from December 16 to December 24 to honor the Virgin Mary, Saint Joseph, the Wise Men, and baby Jesus. The prayers may be recited individually or together as a group. The novena is often read from a book, which contains all the prayers and songs, and is passed around and read. Just as the pilgrims went to a different place each night seeking shelter, a different member of the group may host the novena each night.

The complete order of the readings for each night is the following:

- Prayer for Every Day ("Oración para todos los días")
- Prayer to the Blessed Virgin ("Oración a la Sagrada Virgen")
- Prayer to St. Joseph ("Oración a San José")
- Daily Considerations ("Consideraciones para cada día")
- The Joys ("Los Gozos")
- Prayer to the Baby Jesus ("Oración al Niño Jesus")

== See also ==
- Las Posadas
- Aguinaldo
