= Baye baye =

Filipino rice dish

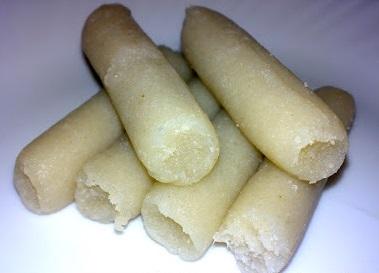
- Course: Dessert
- Place of origin: Philippines
- Region or state: Santa Barbara, Iloilo
- Serving temperature: Cold
- Main ingredients: Rice, grated young coconut, ground corn kernels or ground pinipig (young rice)

Baye-Baye (Tagalog pronunciation: [ˈbaje ˈbaje]) is a Filipino dish made from grated young coconut mixed with either newly harvested rice (pinipig) or corn and shaped into patties. It is a specialty of Cabugao Sur, Santa Barbara, Iloilo.

== See also ==
- Espasol
- Puto bumbong
