= Puto bumbong =

Filipino rice cake

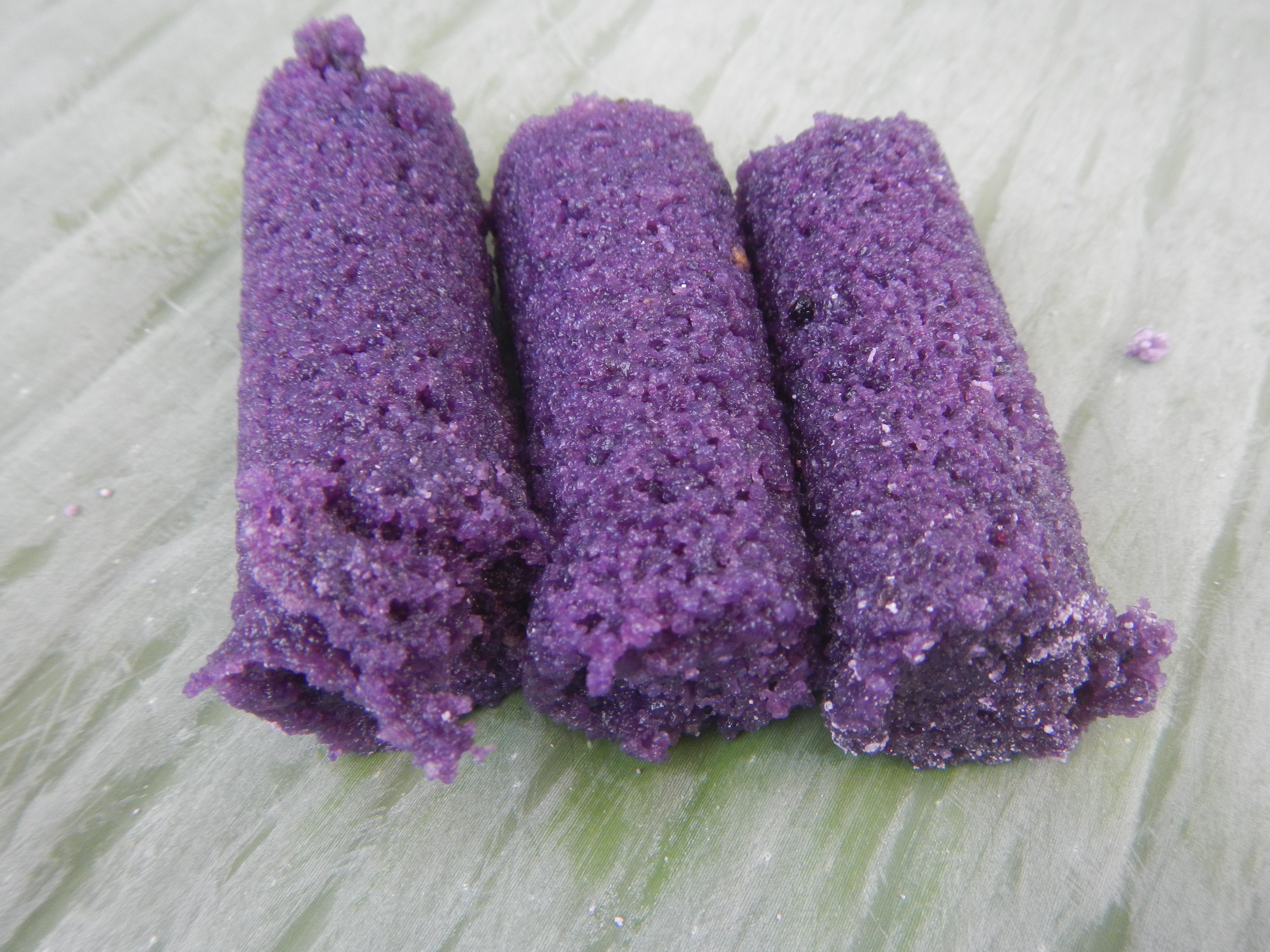
- Alternative names: Puto bombong
- Course: Dessert
- Place of origin: Philippines
- Serving temperature: Room temperature, hot
- Main ingredients: Pirurutong glutinous rice, white glutinous rice, muscovado, grated coconut, butter or margarine, sesame seeds
- Variations: puto
- Similar dishes: kue putu, putu bambu, puttu

Puto bumbong is a Filipino purple rice cake steamed in bamboo tubes. It is traditionally sold during the Christmas season. It is a type of steamed rice cake.

== Etymology ==
The name is derived from Tagalog puto ('steamed rice cake') and bumbong or bombong ('bamboo tube'). The names are sometimes mistakenly spelled as puto bungbong or puto bongbong.

== Description ==
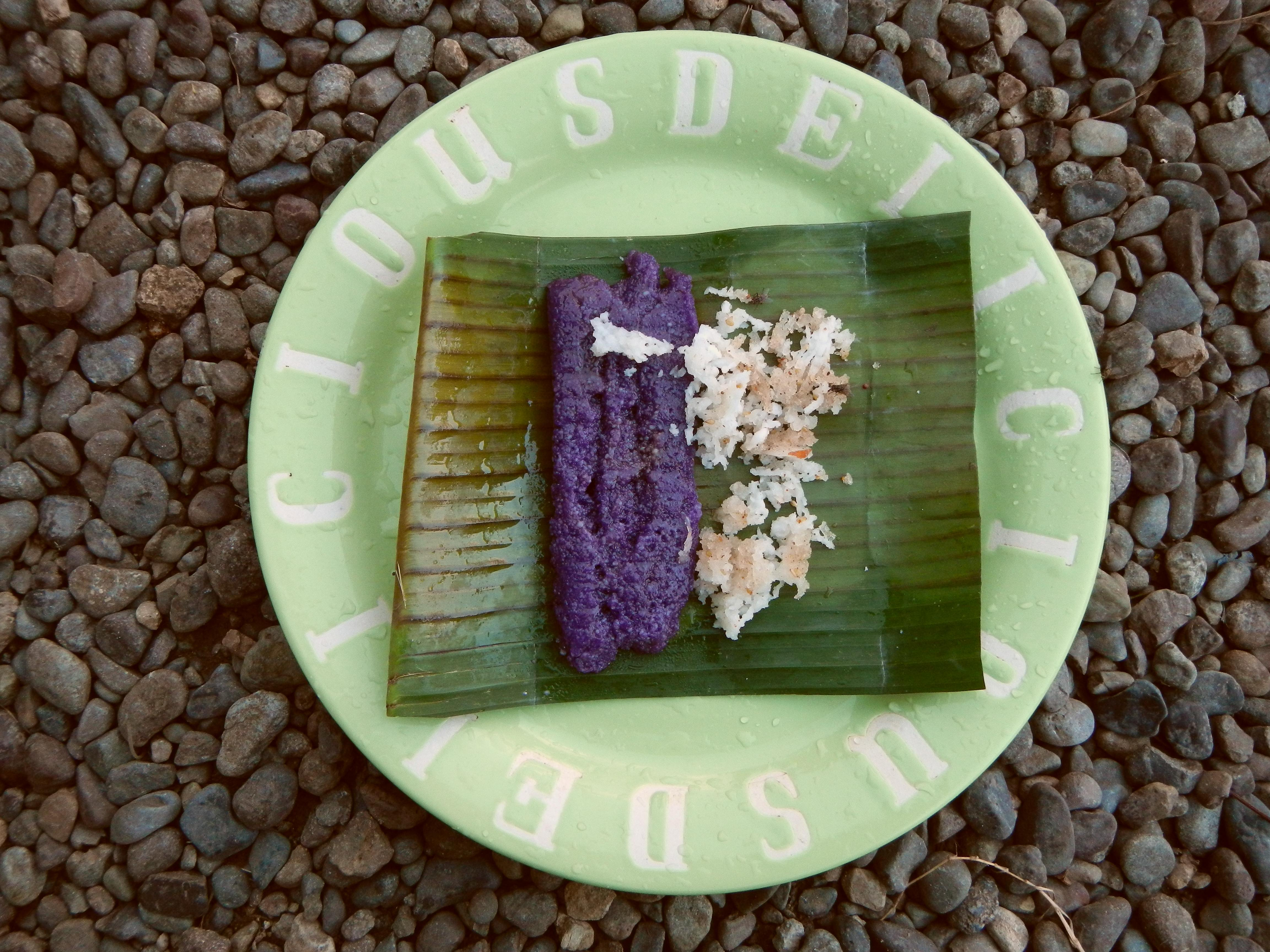
Puto bumbong

Puto bumbóng is made from a unique heirloom variety of glutinous rice called pirurutong (also called tapol in Visayan), which is deep purple to near-black in color. Pirurutong is mixed with a larger ratio of white glutinous rice (malagkít or malagkít sungsong in Tagalog; pilit in Visayan). Regular white rice may also be used instead of malagkít, to give the dish a less chewy consistency.

The rice grains are covered completely in water (traditionally mixed with salt) and left to soak overnight. This gives it a slightly acidic, fermented aftertaste. The mixture is then drained and packed densely into bamboo tubes and steamed. The sides of the bamboo tubes are traditionally greased with coconut oil, but modern techniques use butter or margarine. The rice is traditionally cooked as whole grains, but in some recipes, the rice is ground before or after soaking.

The resulting cylindrical rice cake is then served on banana leaves, slathered with more butter or margarine, seasoned with muscovado sugar, brown sugar, white sugar, grated coconut, and sometimes sesame seeds. Less common toppings include condensed milk (as an alternative to sugars), grated cheese, and leche flan.

== Cultural significance ==
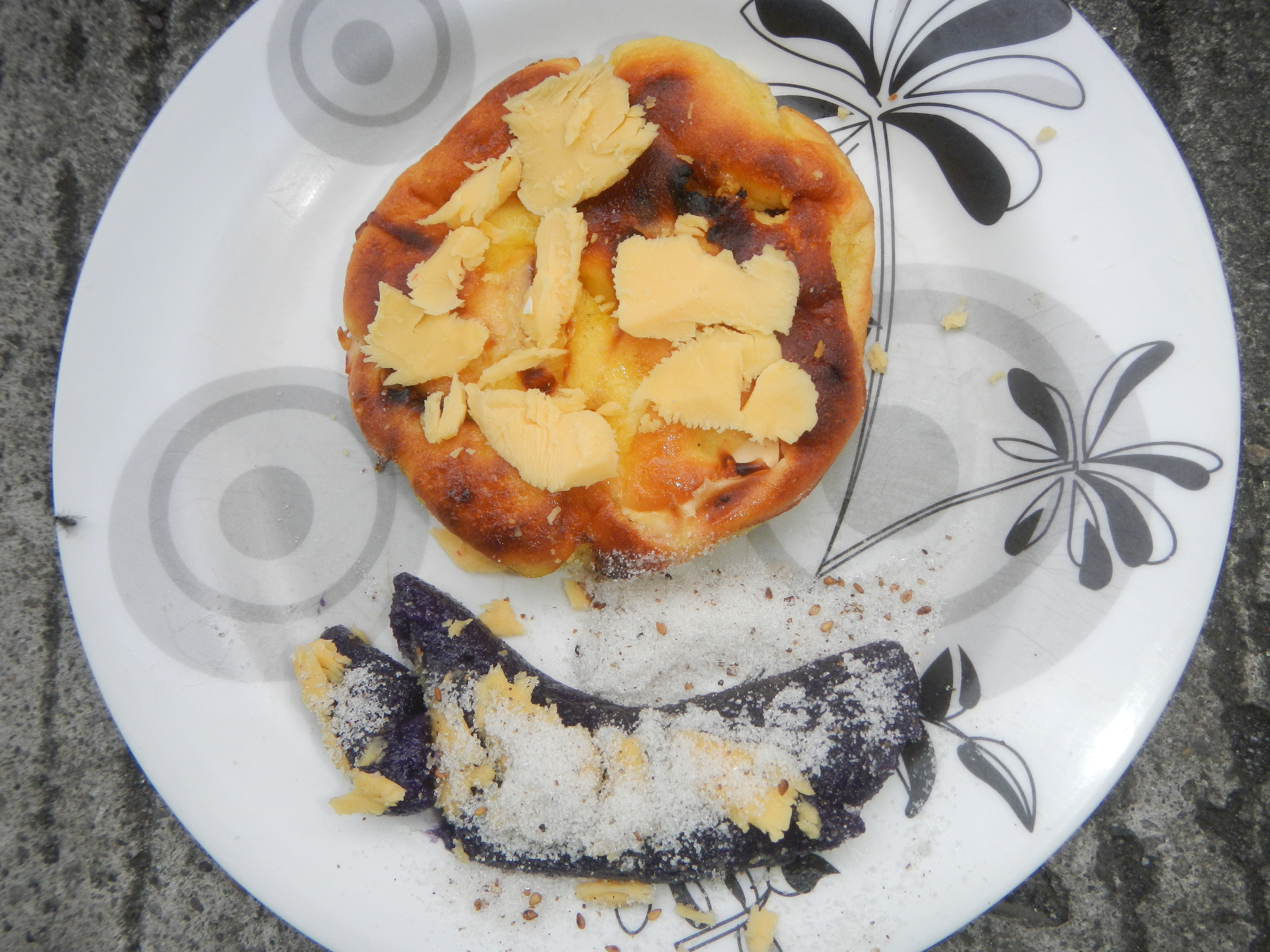
Puto bumbóng and bibingka, two dishes commonly eaten during the Christmas season in the Philippines

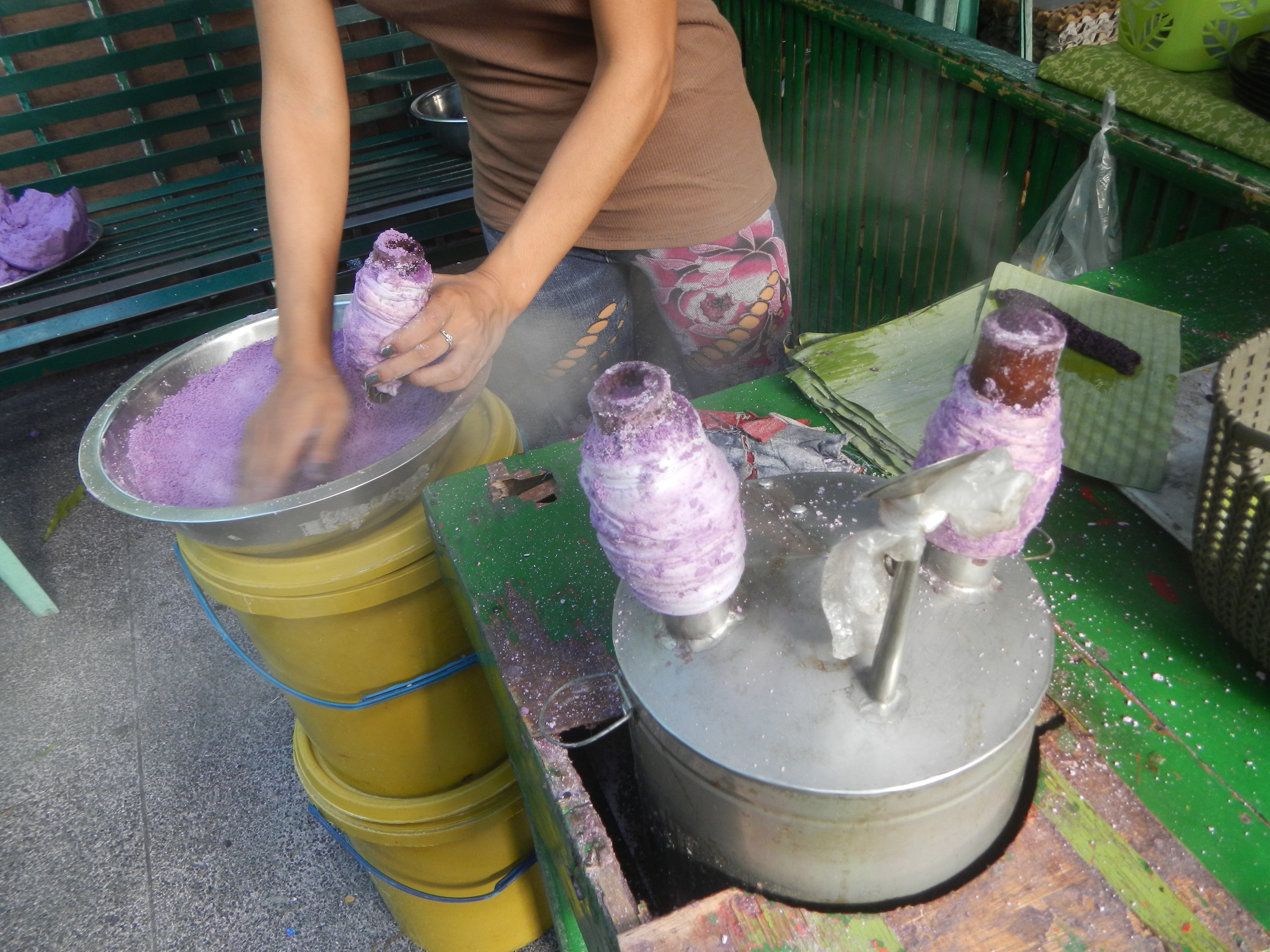
Puto bumbóng vendor packing rice into bamboo tubes for steaming

Puto bumbóng is commonly served as a snack or breakfast dish during the Christmas season. It is usually associated with the nine-day traditional Simbáng Gabí devotion, where stalls serving snacks including puto bumbóng are set up outside churches before dawn.

== Variations ==
Modern puto bumbong may use metal cylinders or regular food steamers. These versions are commonly shaped into little balls or long narrow tubes (similar to suman). In some modern versions, pirurutóng is excluded altogether as it can be hard to find, and purple food coloring or even purple yam (ube) flour are used instead. However, these versions may be frowned upon as being inauthentic.

Adaptations of the dish in restaurants include ice-cream flavors, pancakes, cakes, and empanadas.

A variant of puto bumbóng from the provinces of Batangas and Pampanga is putong sulot, which uses white glutinous rice. Unlike puto bumbóng, it is available year-round.

== Similar desserts ==
In Indonesia a similar dessert is known as kue putu in Indonesian. It is also cooked in bamboo tubes, but is made with rice flour. It is also commonly green due to the use of pandan leaves as flavoring.

In South India (Kerala, Tamil Nadu, and Karnataka) and Sri Lanka, a similar dish is known as puttu (in Tamil) or pittu, though it is a savory dish rather than a dessert.

Both of these related dishes are different in that they use regular (non-sticky) rice flour or ground white rice, but they are all cooked in bamboo tubes.

== See also ==
- Baye baye
- Biko
- Espasol
- Kakanin
- Suman
- Tupig
