= Espasol =

Cylinder-shaped Filipino rice cake

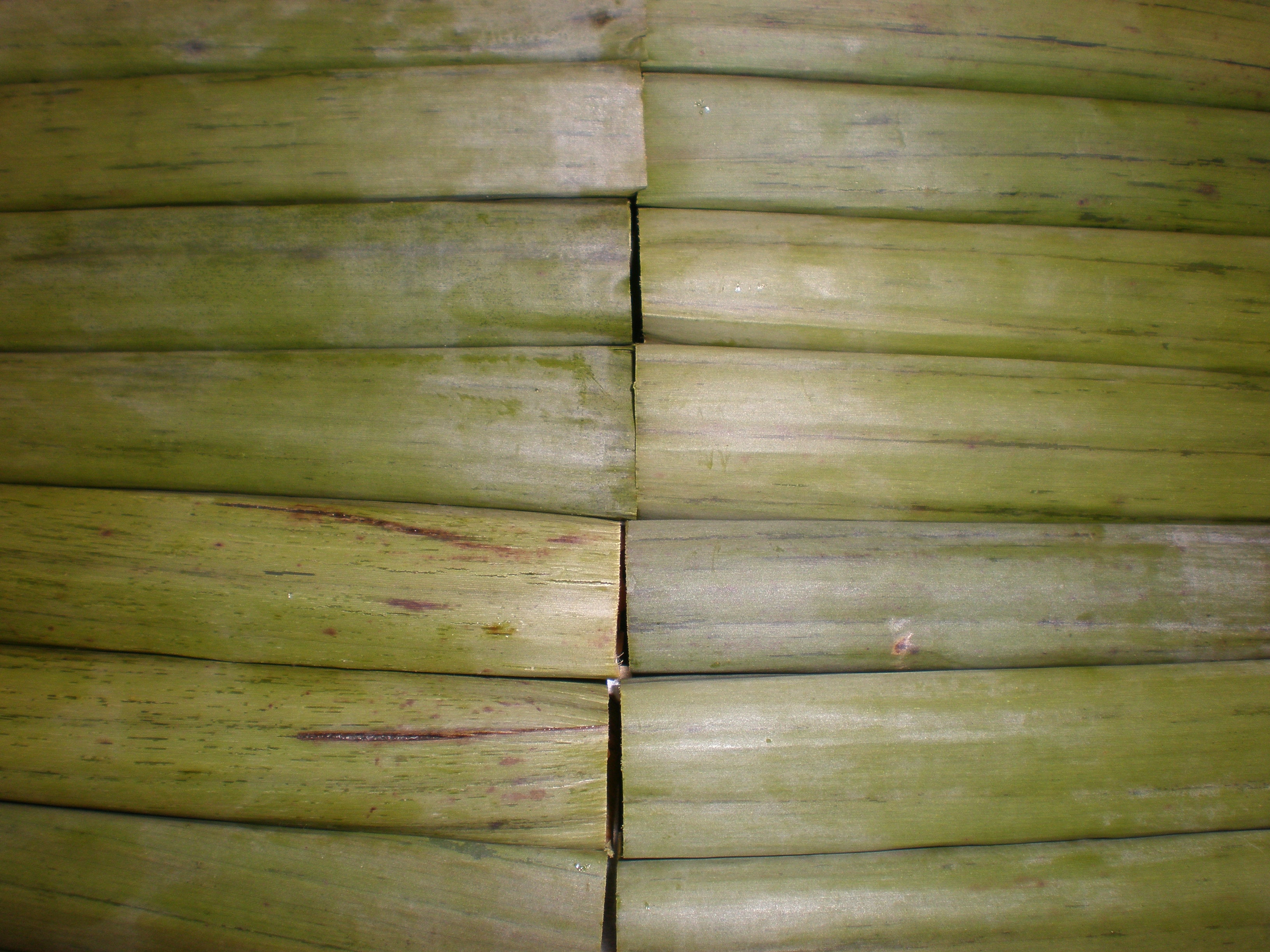
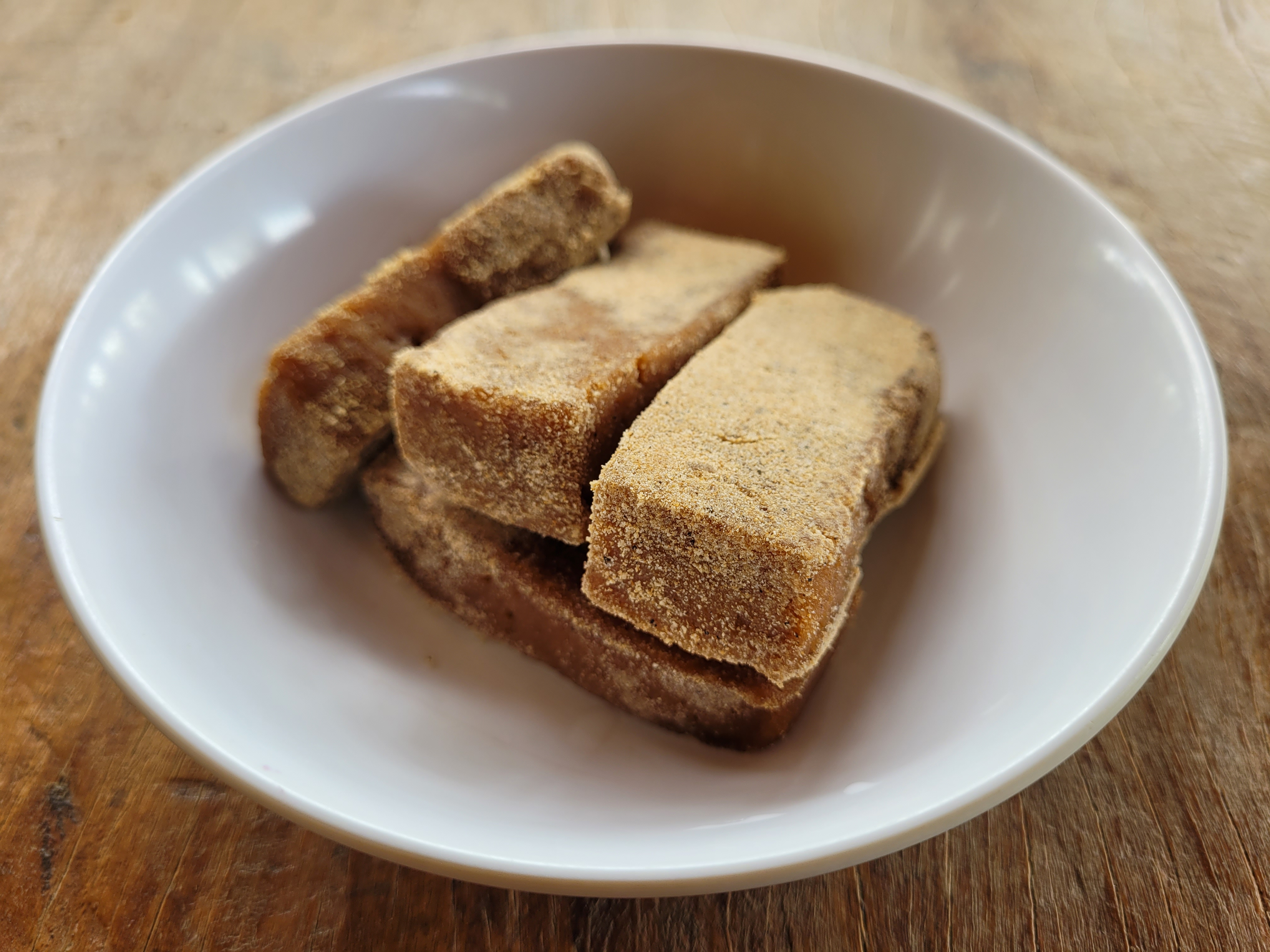
- Top: Espasol in banana leaves; Bottom: Espasol cut into rectangles
- Type: Rice cake
- Place of origin: Philippines
- Region or state: Laguna
- Main ingredients: Rice flour, coconut milk, sweetened coconut
- Similar dishes: Mont pya lu

Espasol is a chewy and soft, cylinder-shaped Filipino rice cake. It is made from glutinous rice flour cooked in coconut milk and sweetened coconut strips and, afterwards, dusted or coated with toasted rice flour.

Originating from the province of Laguna, it is traditionally sold during the Christmas season. Nowadays, espasol can be found on major thoroughfares, street stores, and bus stops in and near Laguna. It can also be found in specialty stores and pasalubong centers in and near Laguna.

== See also ==
- Baye baye
- Puto bumbong
