= Simbang Gabi =

Pre-Christmas religious tradition in the Philippines

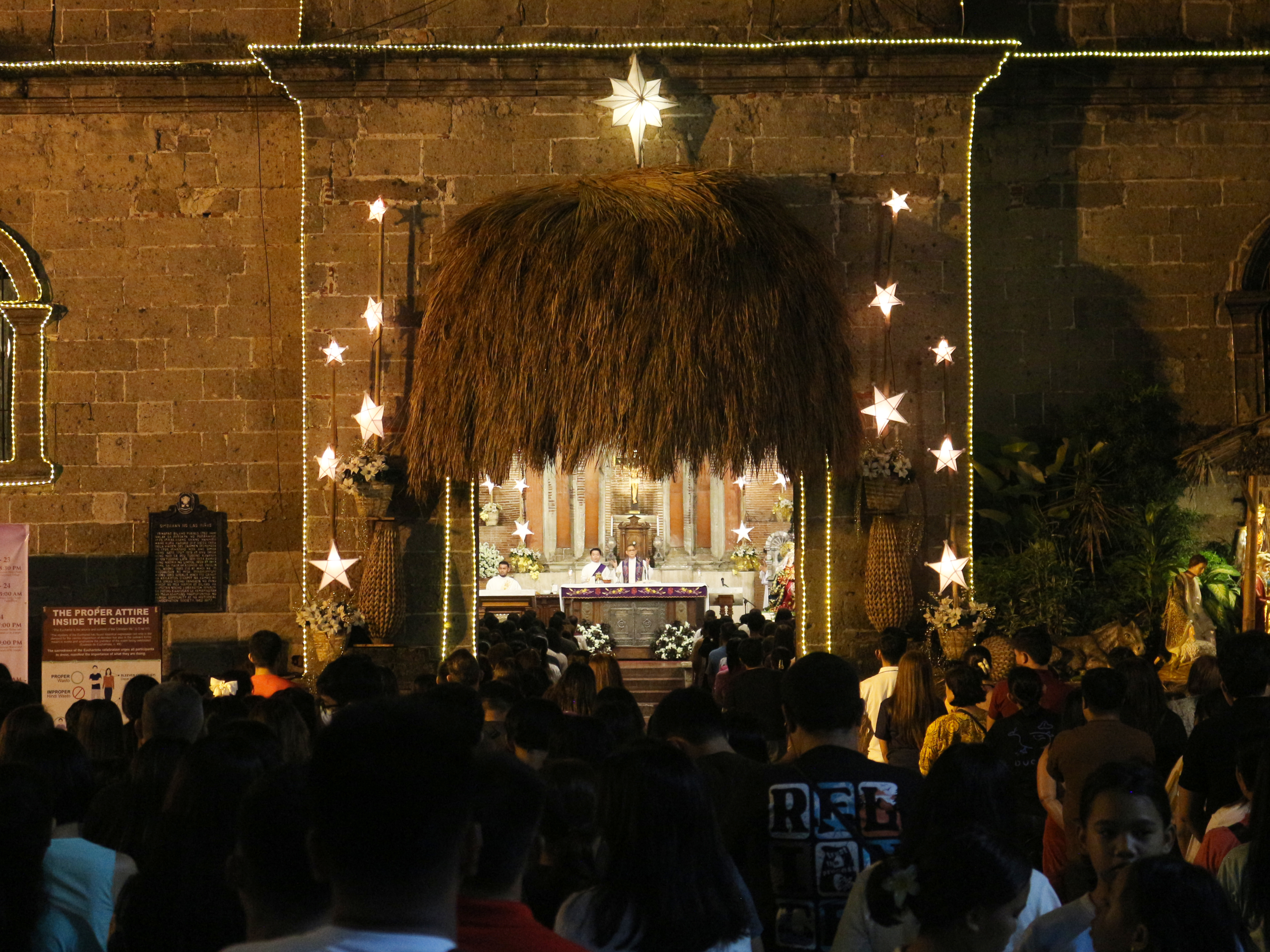
- An overflow crowd at Las Piñas Church during a 2024 Simbang Gabi Mass watches the priest celebrate the liturgy through the decorated entrance.
- Also called: Misa de Aguinaldo; Misa de Gallo (for the last Mass observed in Simbang Gabi)
- Observed by: Filipino Catholics
- Liturgical color: White
- Type: Nine-day series of Masses
- Significance: Christmas season
- Begins: December 16; December 15 (anticipated)
- Ends: December 24; December 23 (anticipated)
- First time: 1669
- Related to: Misa de Gallo; Noche Buena; Christmas

Simbang Gabi (Tagalog: [sɪmˌbaŋ ɡɐˈbi]; Filipino for "night worship") is a devotional, nine-day series of Masses attended by Filipino Catholics in anticipation of Christmas. It is similar to the nine dawn Masses leading to Christmas Eve practiced in Puerto Rico called Misa de Aguinaldo. Originally intended as a practical compromise for farmers who began working in the fields before sunrise, this cherished Christmas custom eventually became a distinct feature of Philippine culture and became a symbol of sharing.

Simbang Gabi is held daily from December 16 to 24 and occurs at different times ranging from as early as 2:30 a.m. to 5:00 a.m. Anticipated celebrations, meanwhile, are held from December 15 to 23, typically at 8:00 p.m. or as late as 11:00 p.m. or midnight. On the last day of the Simbang Gabi, which is Christmas Eve, the service is instead called Misa de Gallo (Spanish for "Rooster's Mass").

== History ==
Simbang Gabi originated in 1669 during the Spanish colonization of the Philippines, as a practical compromise for farmers who began working before sunrise. It was transferred from a practice in Mexico, wherein the Pope granted Friar Diego de Soria, the head of the San Agustín Acolman convent, the right to celebrate Christmas Mass outside due to the crowdedness of the church. This practice was exported from Mexico to the Philippines. When the Christmas season would begin, it was customary to hold novenas in the evenings, a practice common in the rest of the Hispanic world; however, the priests saw that the people would attend despite the day's fatigue. As such, with the Philippines being an agricultural country known for its rice, coconut, and sugarcane plantations, the clergy began to say Masses in the early morning while it was still dark, before people went out to work the land.

From 1680 to 1689, however, this practice was temporarily halted following a decree from the Holy See against the singing of hymns in native languages. The decree was also implemented in Spain, the Azores, and Mexico. At the time, the hymns could only be sung at the start and end of the Tridentine Mass. Following the death of the Manila Archbishop Felipe Pardo, priests resumed the celebration of the pre-dawn Masses. It eventually became an important cultural tradition in the Philippines at the turn of the 19th century.

In 1953, the First Plenary Council of the Philippines petitioned the Holy See to continue the practice of Misa de Gallo, which was later granted. In 1961, the Vatican granted the continuation of the indult.

On December 15, 2019, Gaudete Sunday, Pope Francis led the celebration of Simbang Gabi for the Filipino Catholic community at St. Peter's Basilica in Vatican City, the first time a pope has led the traditional Mass.

== Current practices ==
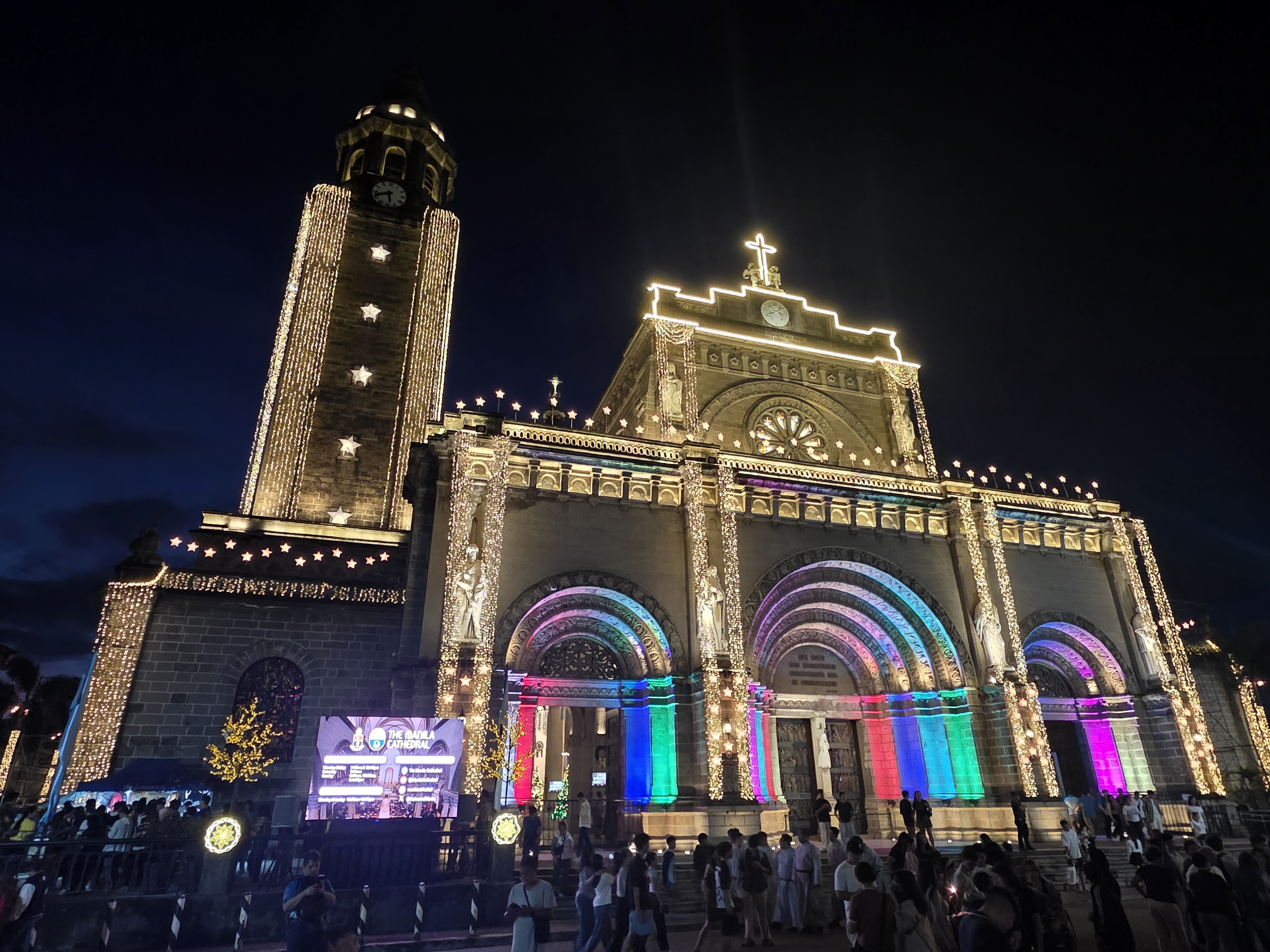
Manila Cathedral decorated with lights for Simbang Gabí.

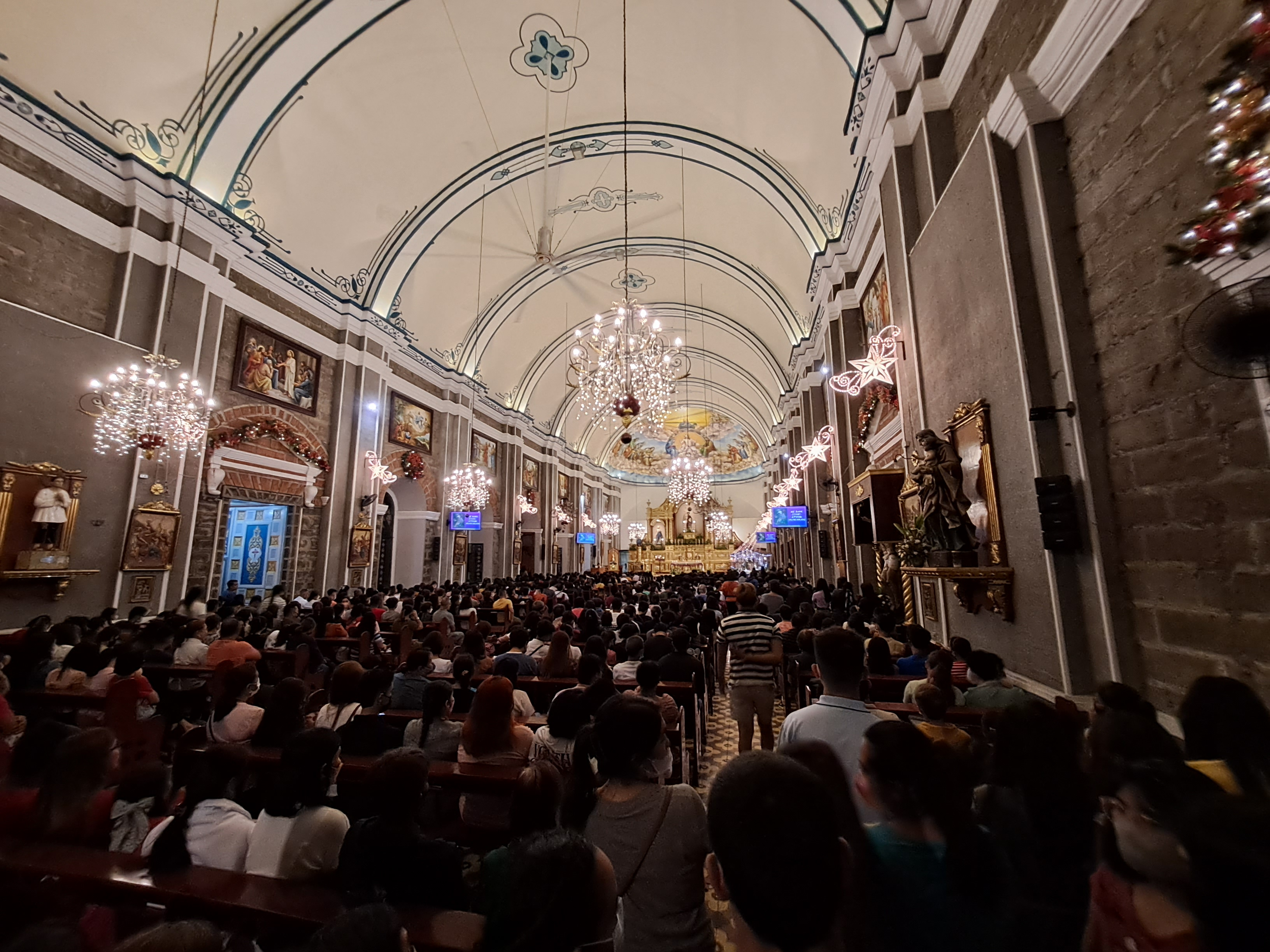
Simbang Gabi at Ibaan Church, Batangas

Liturgically, Simbang Gabi is a series of votive Masses in honor of the Blessed Virgin Mary. Unless it is celebrated on a Sunday of Advent, the Mass is celebrated with great solemnity where the Gloria is sung and white is the liturgical color. Violet or pink is used for any other Masses said during the day.

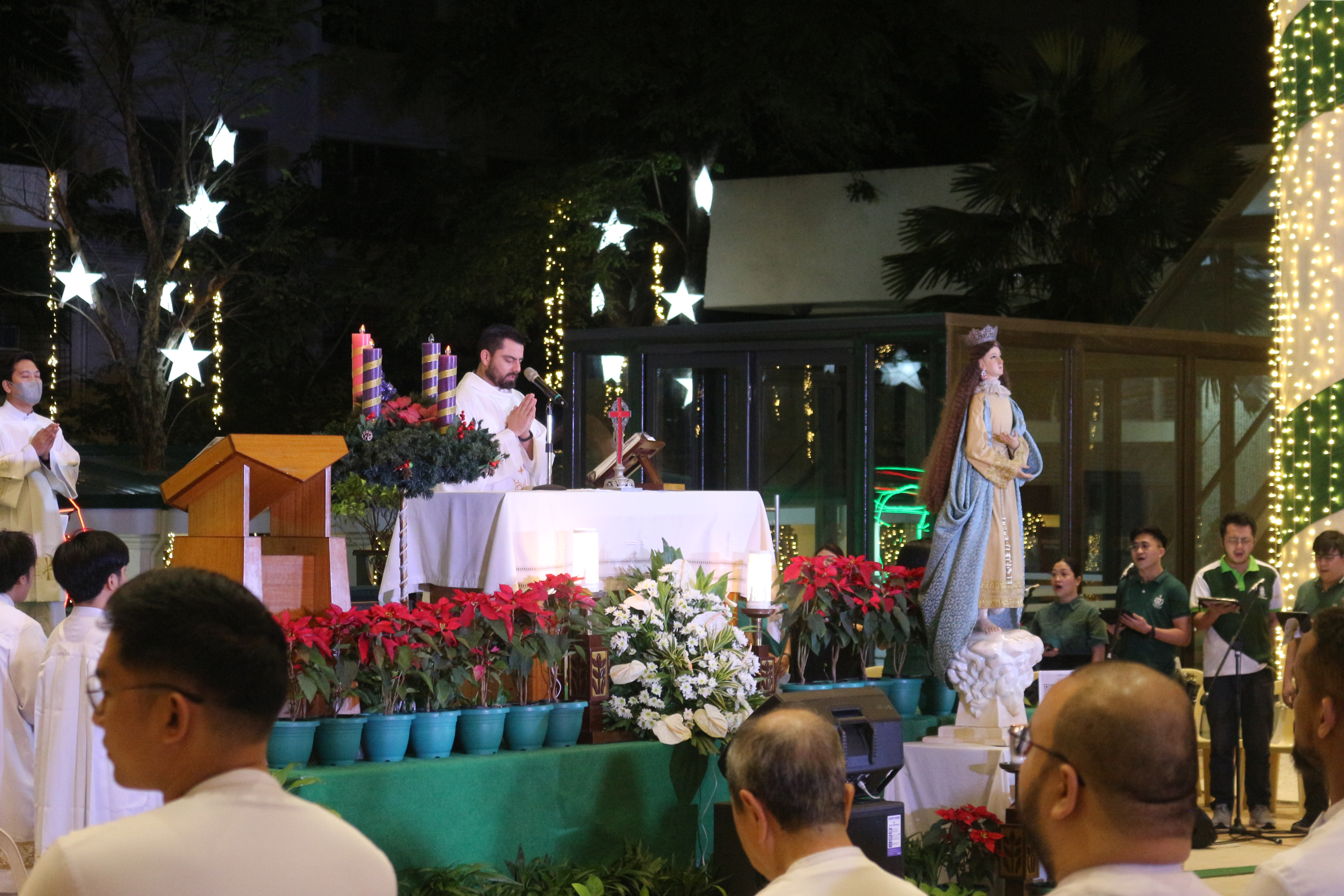
Simbang Gabi being celebrated at the Henry Sy Sr. Hall grounds, an open space in De La Salle University.

The Mass usually begins at 4:00 a.m., while some parishes, particularly San Pedro Cathedral in Davao City, start earlier at 3:00 a.m. Pope Sixtus V ordered that Mass must be heard before sunrise since it was the harvest season, and farmers needed to be in the fields right after the liturgy.

Simbang Gabi is also celebrated in malls, usually in open spaces. The Archdiocese of Manila has discouraged the celebration of Mass in malls, except when a mall has its own chapel.

Evening celebrations of Simbang Gabi are also held from December 15 until 23. Although erroneously described as "anticipated Simbang Gabi" (since vigil or anticipated Masses are only applicable for Sundays and solemnities), these are done especially in urban areas. However, the propers and readings used for these Masses are those which are prescribed for the day. "Anticipation" of the propers and readings prescribed for the next day is usually prohibited; however, it is allowed by the Archdiocese of Manila.

A well-known folk belief is that if a devotee completes all nine days of the Simbang Gabi, God may grant a request made as part of the novena.

To give the faithful a chance to experience how Simbang Gabi was celebrated during the Spanish Era, groups which celebrate the Traditional Latin Mass also have the Simbang Gabi in candlelight, using locally composed, centuries-old settings for the propers and ordinaries of the Mass.

== Cuisine ==
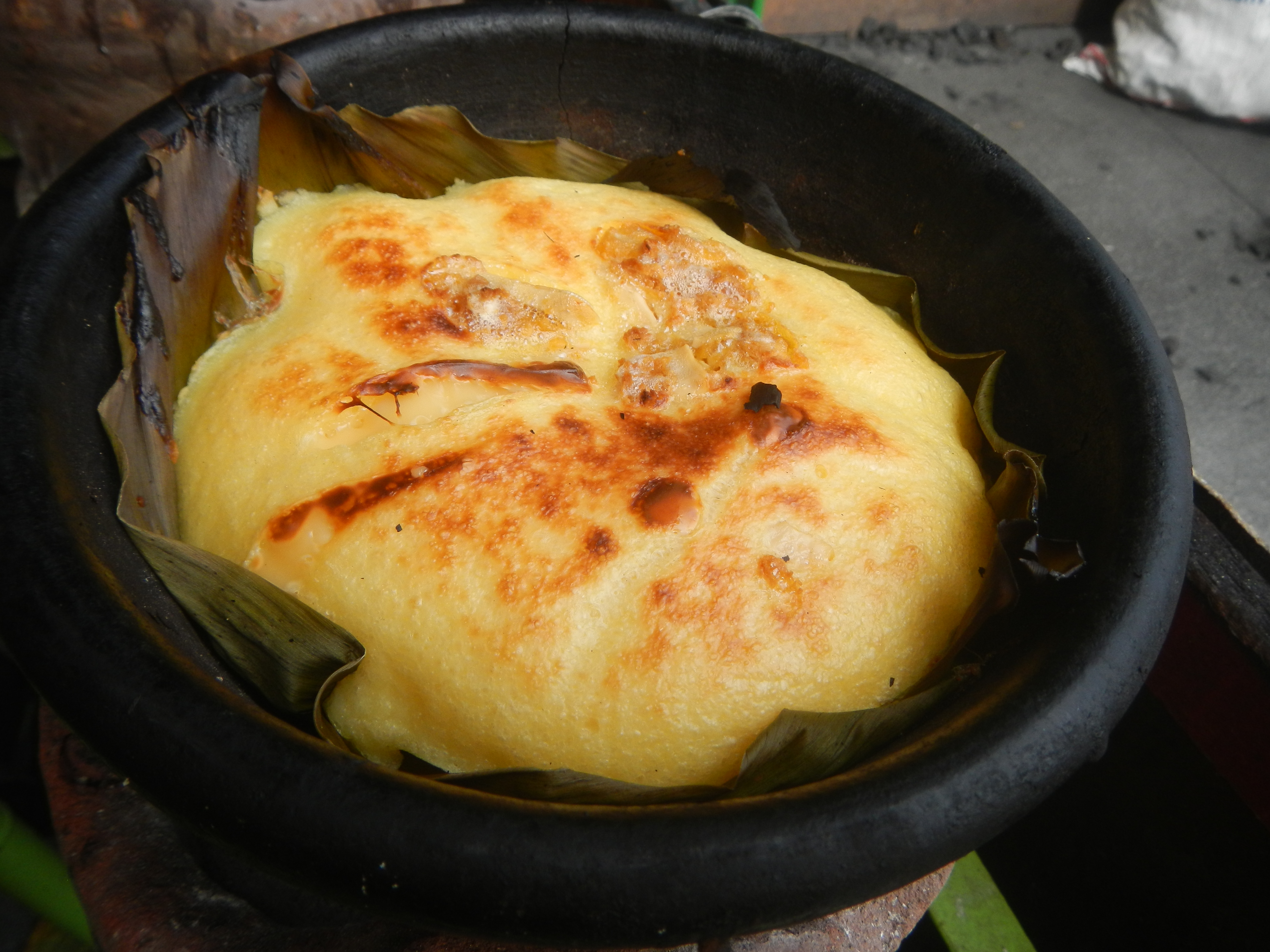
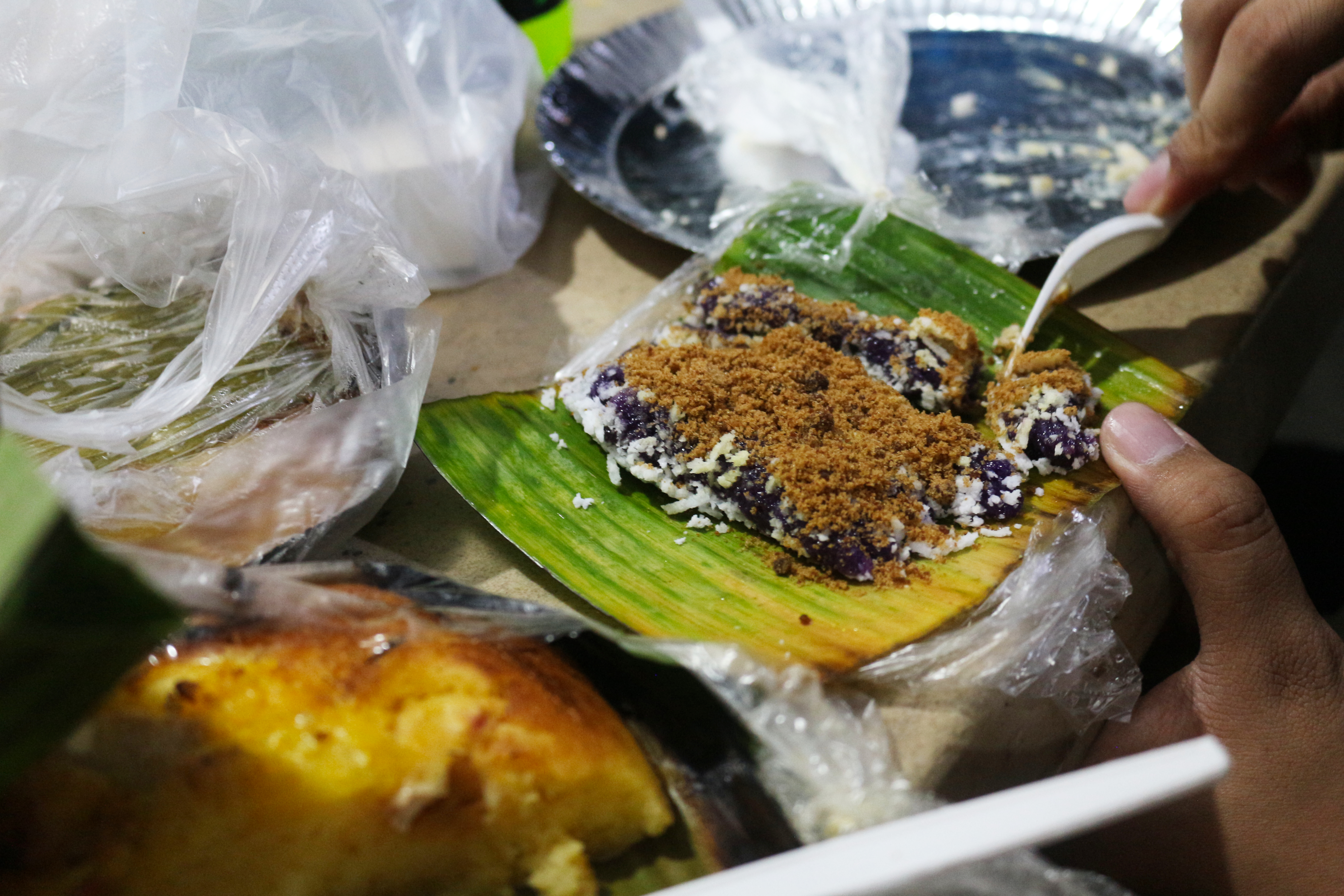
Bibingka rice cakes and puto bumbong, dishes commonly associated with Simbang Gabi

During the Spanish colonial era and early American colonial period, the parishioners would mostly have nothing to offer during Mass except sacks of rice, fruits and vegetables, and fresh eggs. The church would share the produce with the congregation after the service.

After Mass, Filipinos buy and eat holiday delicacies sold in the churchyard for breakfast. Bibingka (rice cakes cooked above and below) and puto bumbong (steamed purple rice pastries, seasoned with butter, grated coconut, and brown sugar) are popular, often paired with tsokolate (hot chocolate from local cacao) or salabát (ginger tea).

Today, local delicacies are readily available in the church's premises for the parishioners. The iconic puto bumbóng, bibingka, suman and other rice pastries are cooked on the spot. Latík and yema are sweets sold to children, while biscuits like uraró (arrowroot), barquillos, lengua de gato and otap (ladyfingers) are also available. Kapeng barako (a very strong coffee grown in the province of Batangas), hot tsokolate, or salabat are the main drinks, while soups such as arróz caldo (rice and chicken porridge) and papait (goat bile stew from the Ilocos region) are also found.

The rice-based foods were traditionally served to fill the stomachs of the farmers, since rice was a cheap and primary staple. The pastries were full of carbohydrates needed by colonial Filipinos for the work they undertook in the rice paddies and sugar mills.

Those attending the evening Masses add these to the dinner served after the liturgy.

== Decorations and material culture ==
Filipino Christmas lanterns called parol are linked to Simbang Gabi because they were originally used to light the way to church for people attending the pre-dawn Mass. As Simbang Gabi grew into a wider cultural tradition, the parol evolved from a simple functional object into a decorative emblem of Filipino Christmas, with churches, homes, and streets displaying parols to mark the beginning of the novena and to welcome worshipers.

Nativity displays, locally known as belen, are commonly found in many places like churches, plazas, and homes during Simbang Gabi. The scene usually displays the Holy Family, shepherds, and the wise men. Many churches include large or elaborately decorated belen exhibits as part of their preparation for the nine-day Christmas novena.

== See also ==
- Christmas in the Philippines
- Rorate Coeli
