= Ibaan Church =

Roman Catholic church in Batangas, Philippines

- Archdiocesan Shrine and Parish of Saint James the Greater
- Parokya at Pang-Arsidiyosesis na Dambana ng Santiago Apostol (Filipino); Simbahan ng Ibaan (Filipino)
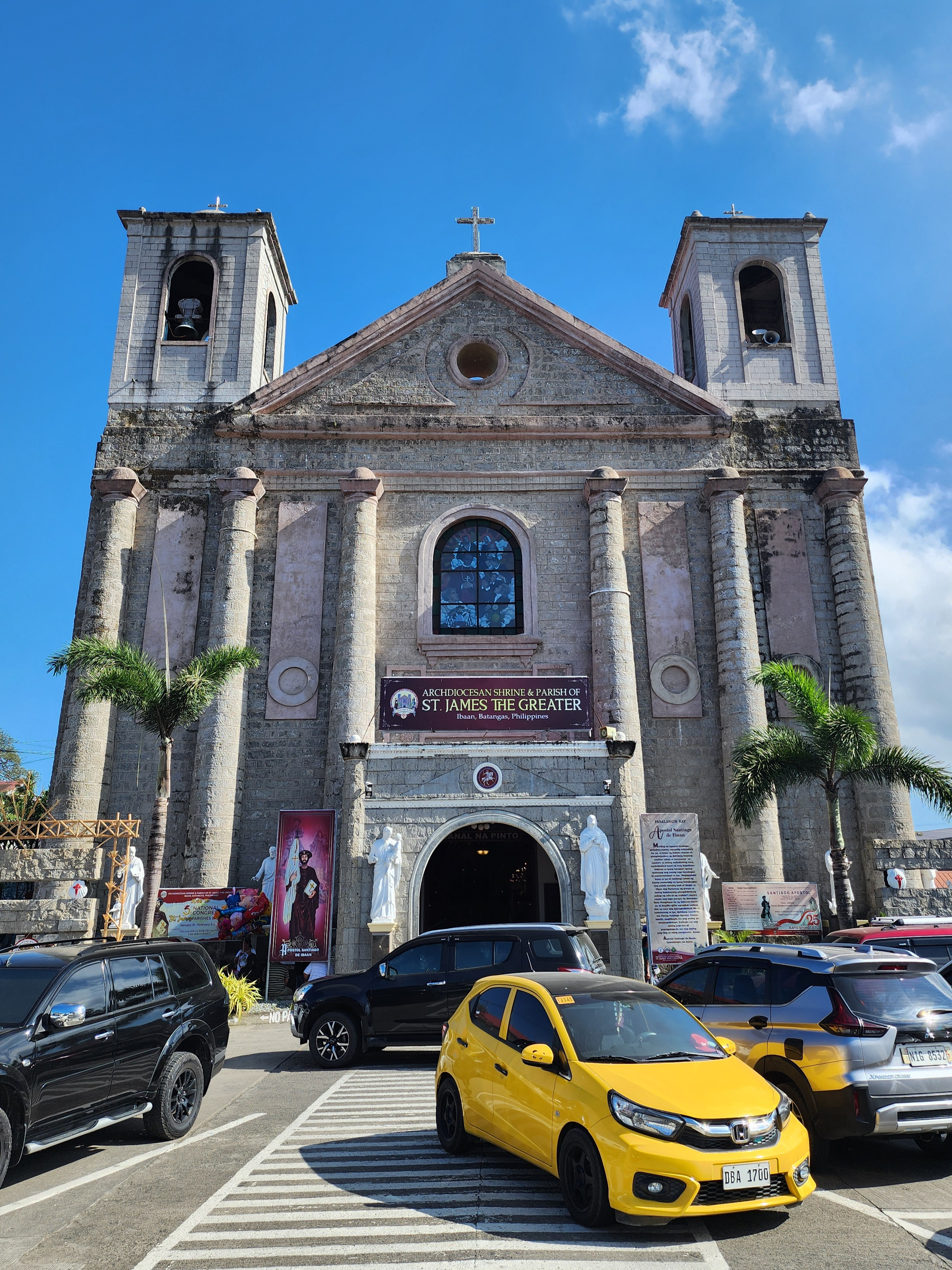
- The church in February 2024

- Location in Luzon Location in the Philippines
- 13°49′08″N 121°07′58″E
- Location: Ibaan, Batangas
- Country: Philippines
- Denomination: Roman Catholic
- Religious institute: Oblates of St. Joseph

History
- Former name: Saint James the Greater Parish
- Status: Archdiocesan Shrine; Parish church
- Founded: 1832
- Founder: Fr. Manuel Grijalbo O.S.A
- Dedication: James the Greater

Architecture
- Functional status: Active
- Architectural type: Church building
- Style: Neo-classic
- Groundbreaking: 1853
- Completed: 1869

Specifications
- Materials: Adobe stone, cement

Administration
- Archdiocese: Lipa
- Deanery: Saint Joseph the Patriarch
- Parish: Saint James the Greater

Clergy
- Rector: Rev. Fr. Eduardo Carandang, OSJ
- Vicar: Jose Dumrique

The Archdiocesan Shrine and Parish of Saint James the Greater, commonly known as Ibaan Church, is a Roman Catholic shrine and parish church in the municipality of Ibaan, Batangas in the Philippines. Known for its Easter traditions of Bati and Dagit, the church was founded in 1817 while the current structure was built from 1853 to 1869.

The church is under the Oblates of Saint Joseph and under the jurisdiction of the Archdiocese of Lipa.

== History ==
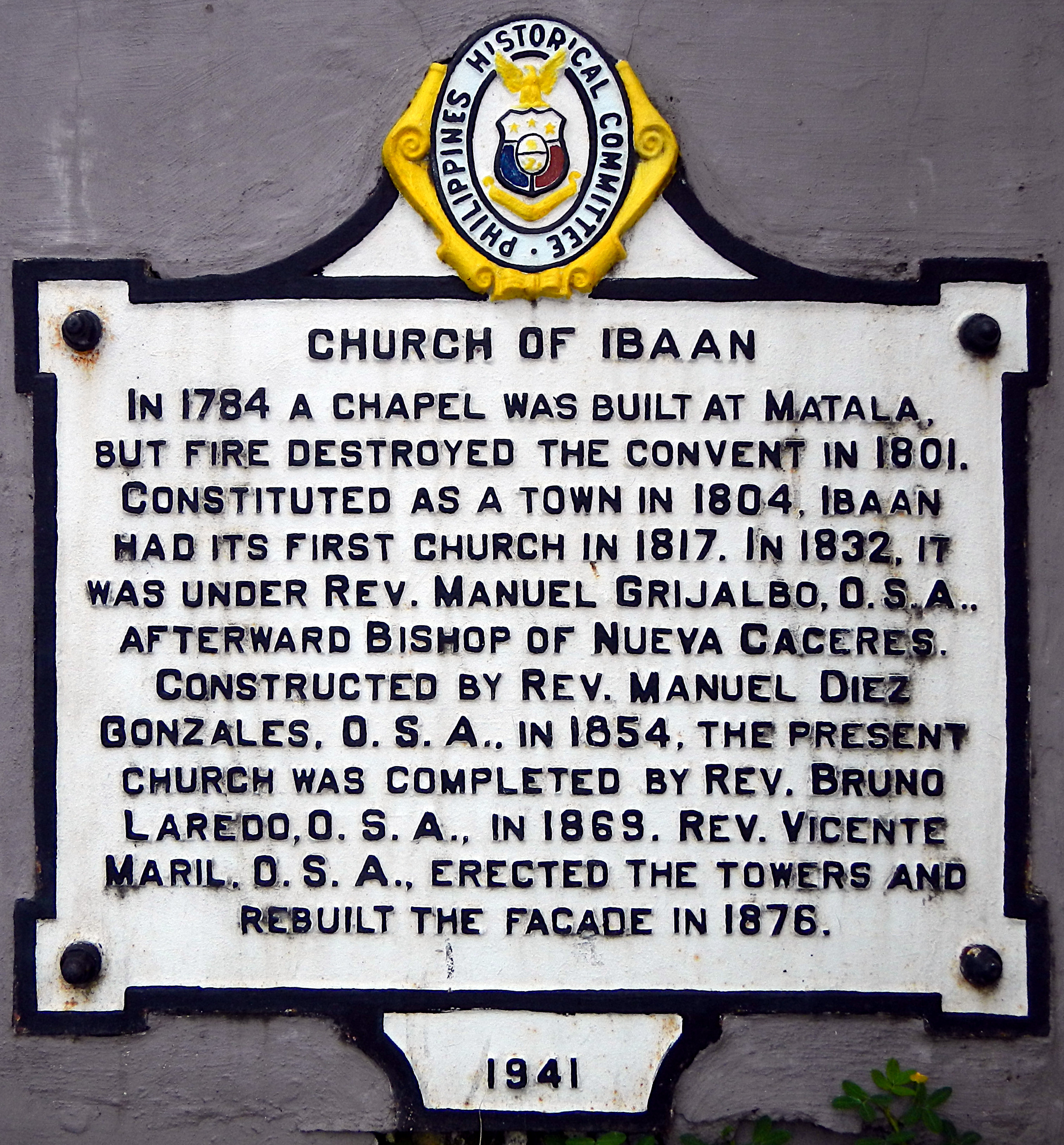
Church PHC historical marker installed in 1941

In 1784, a chapel was built in the present-day Barangay Matala, 4 kilometers (2.5 mi) away from the present-day poblacion. It was destroyed in 1800, based on stories from the folklore, due to the combined strength of acid and fire from the sky.

The first church and convent of Ibaan was built in May 1817 by Fr. Barcelona, while Don Eustacio Macatangay provided the finishing touches on the church. The town was placed under the patronage of Saint James the Apostle. In 1827, a temporary chapel was built at the present site of the church but was destroyed in 1832.

The founding stones of the present church which included its altar and patio were laid down in 1853 by Fr. Manuel Gonzalez, O.S.A. It was completed by Fr. Bruno Laredo in 1869. Architect Luciano Oliver drew a cruciform layout for the church, as well as the first lines of the current church.

The church was damaged by the earthquake of May 29, 1880, and Fr. Francisco Alvarez repaired the damage from 1891 to 1896.

With the erection of the Diocese of Lipa in 1910 (later elevated to an archdiocese in 1972), Ibaan Church was included. The Oblates of St. Joseph then sent priests to the Philippines, providing continuity to the church.

In 2017, in line with the church's bicentennial, the church underwent a major restoration. The altar was renovated, while the ceiling was painted.

The church was elevated to an archdiocesan shrine on June 16, 2022.

== Architecture ==
The church sports a neo-classical style with two belfries and a triangular pediment on the main façade. A transept was added in the design of the present church, located near the retablo (reredos).

The façade has since been covered by cement to make up for the deterioration of the stones. It was however ill-advised, as modern cement would hasten the deterioration of the church instead of the traditional lime mortar. Modern cement traps moisture inside, hastening the deterioration of the structure.

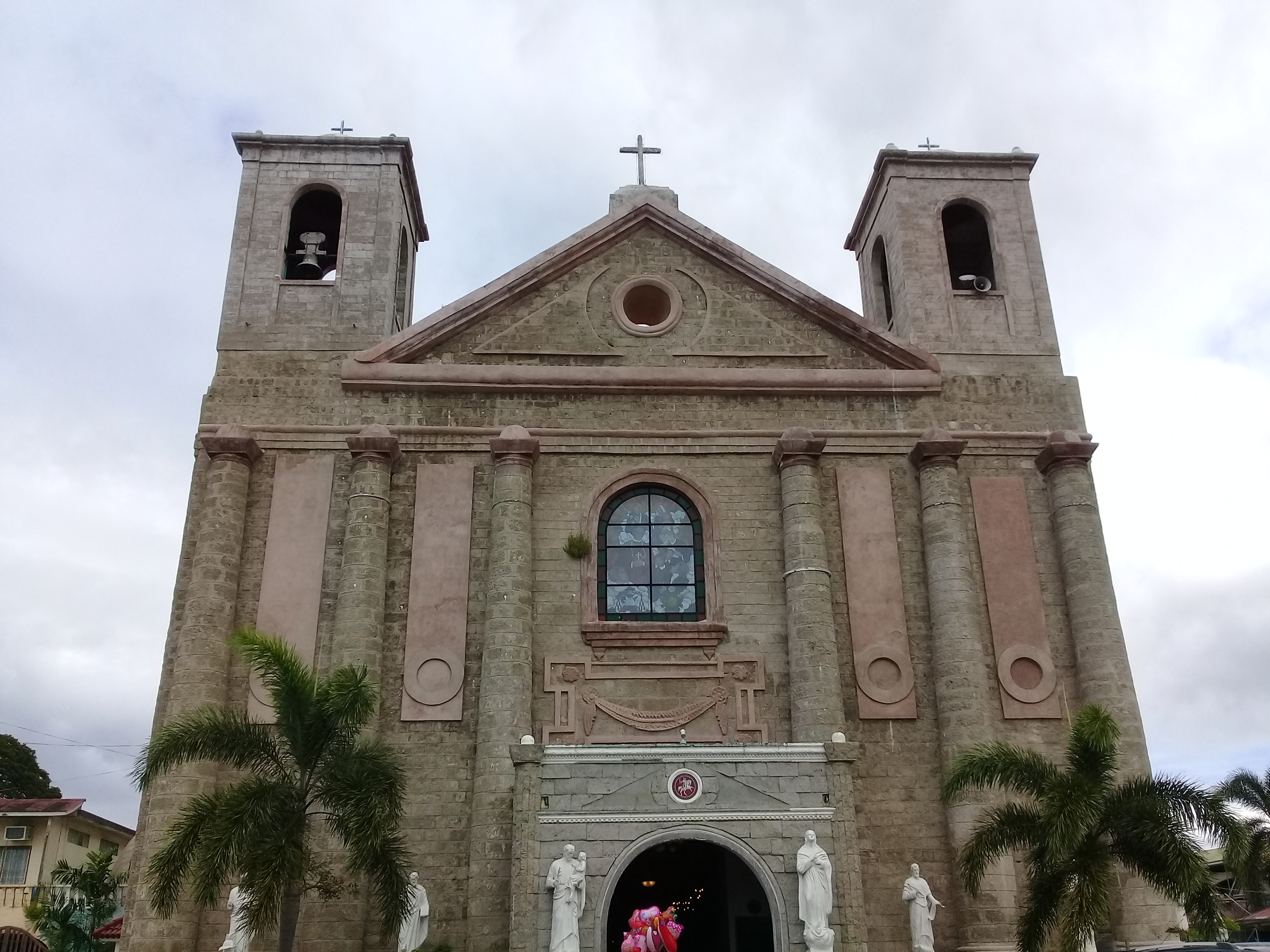
Main façade

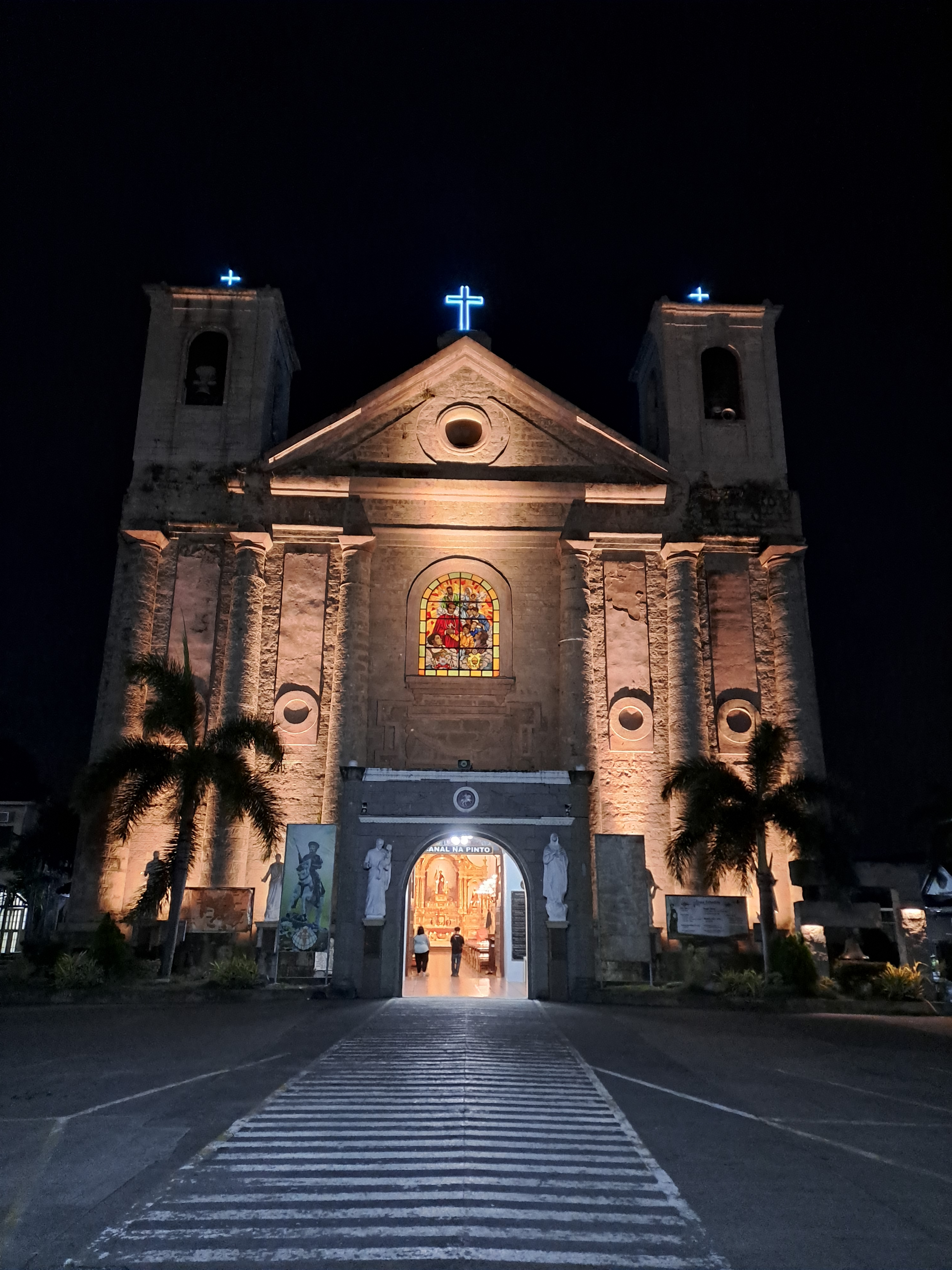
Façade at night

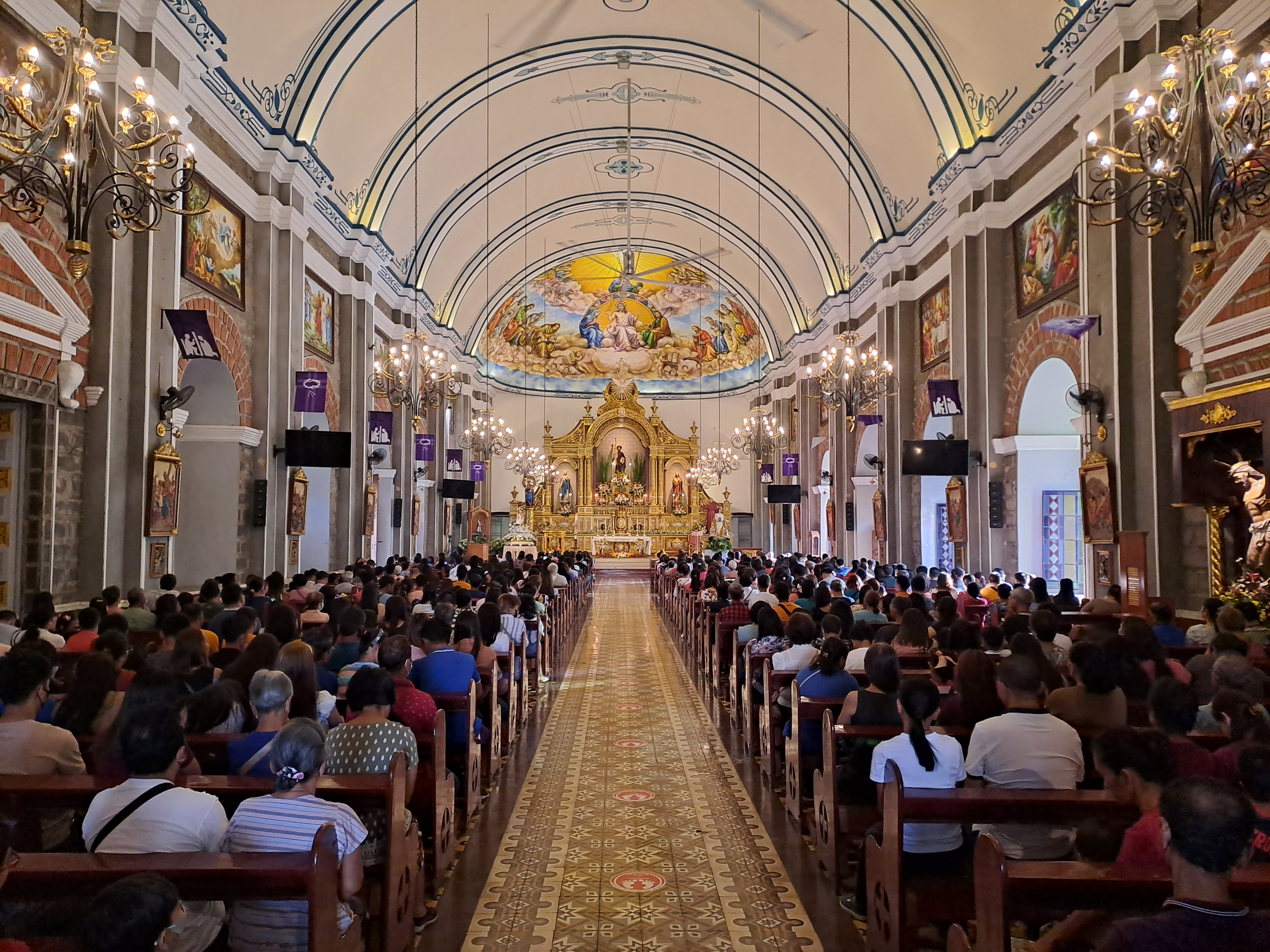
Nave

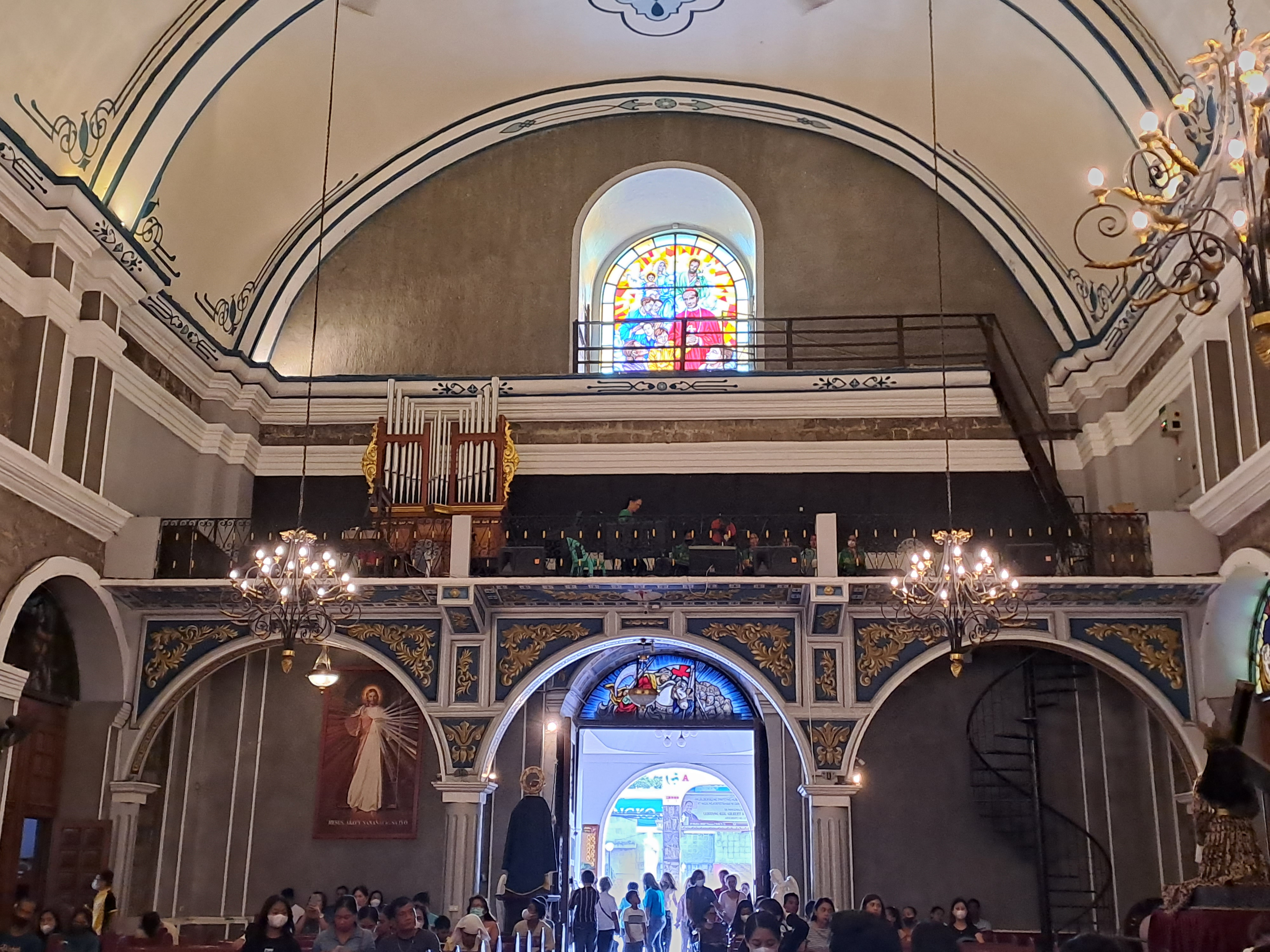
Choir loft

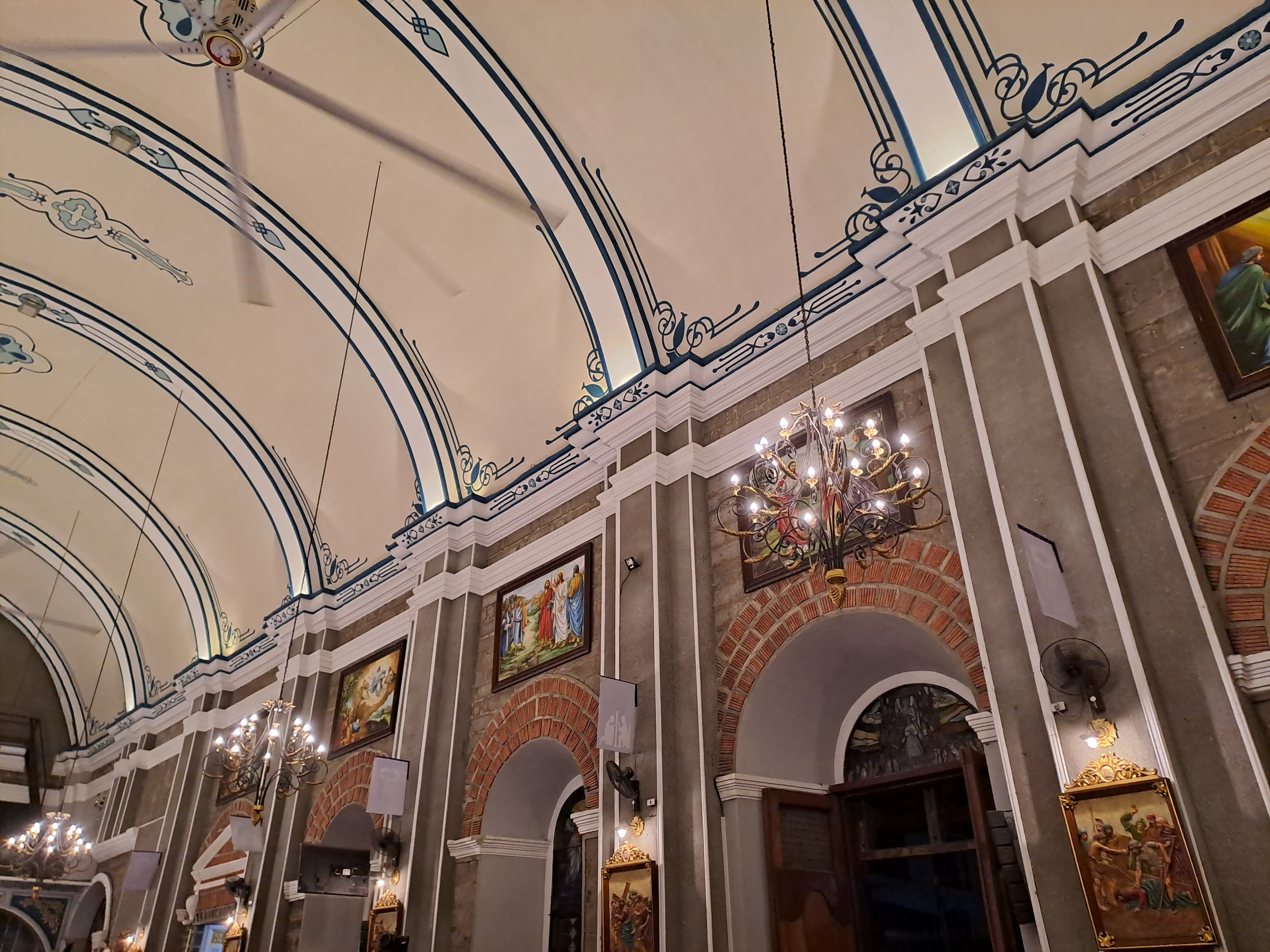
Side walls

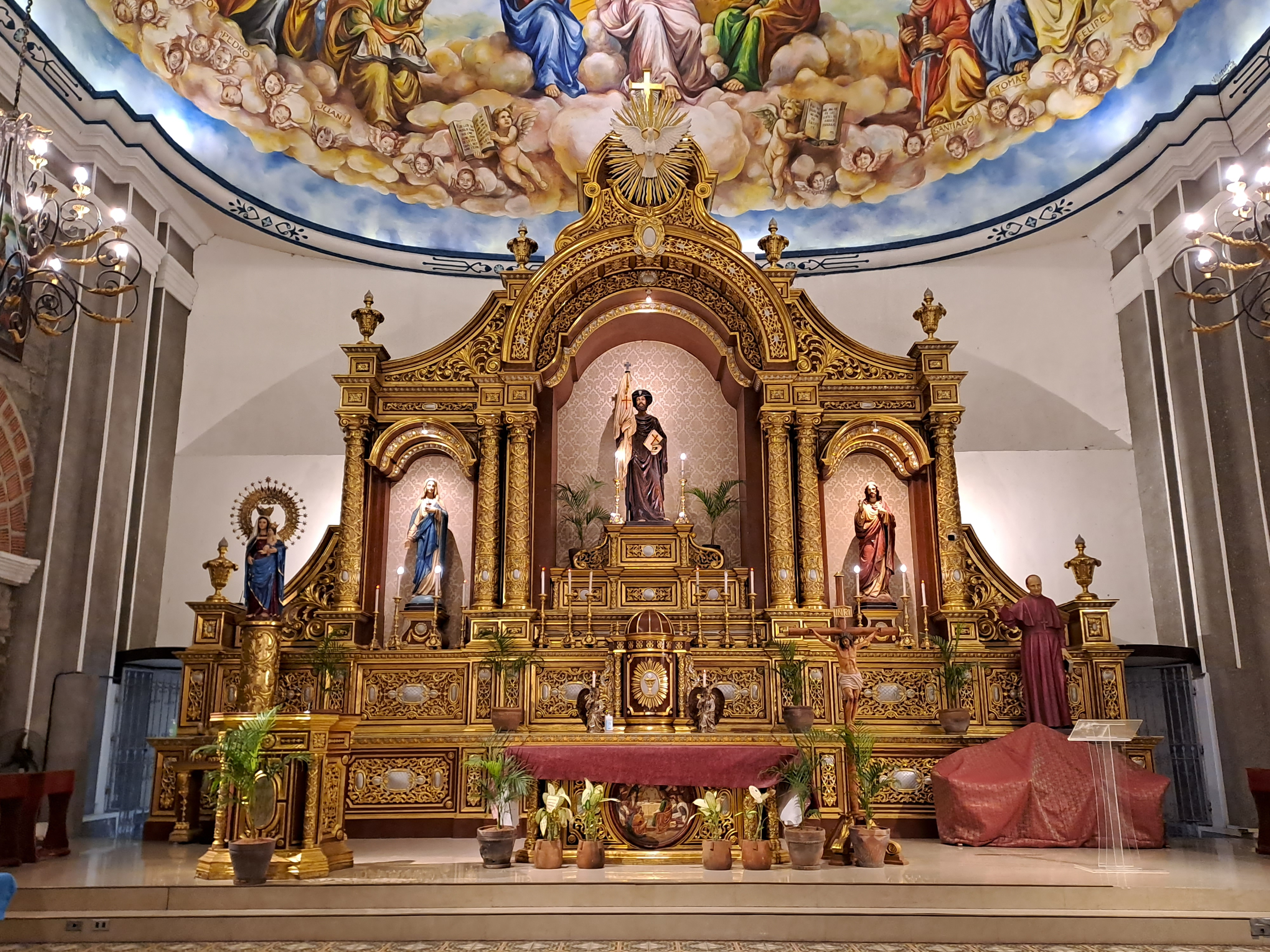
Reredos

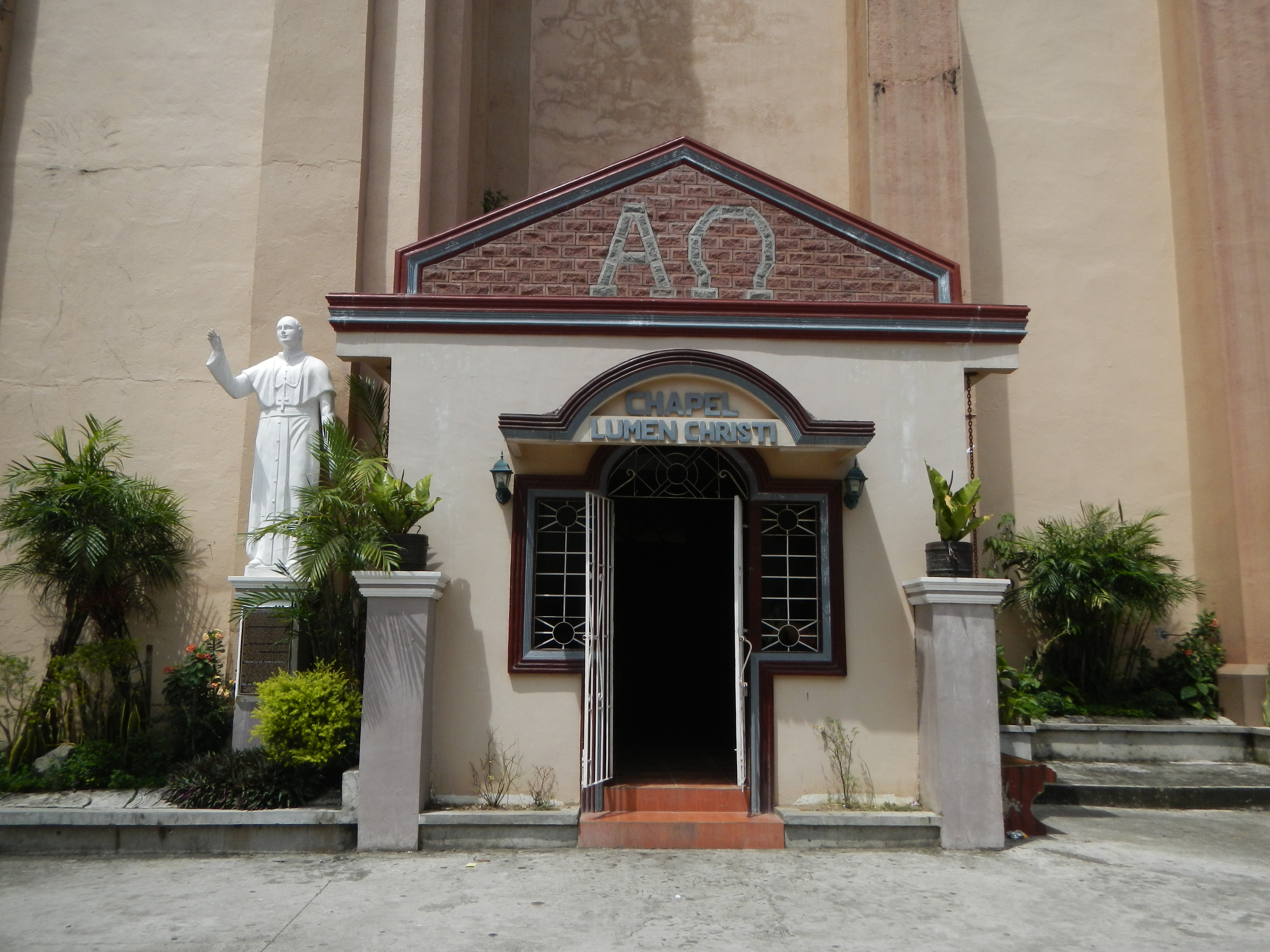
Lumen Christi Chapel

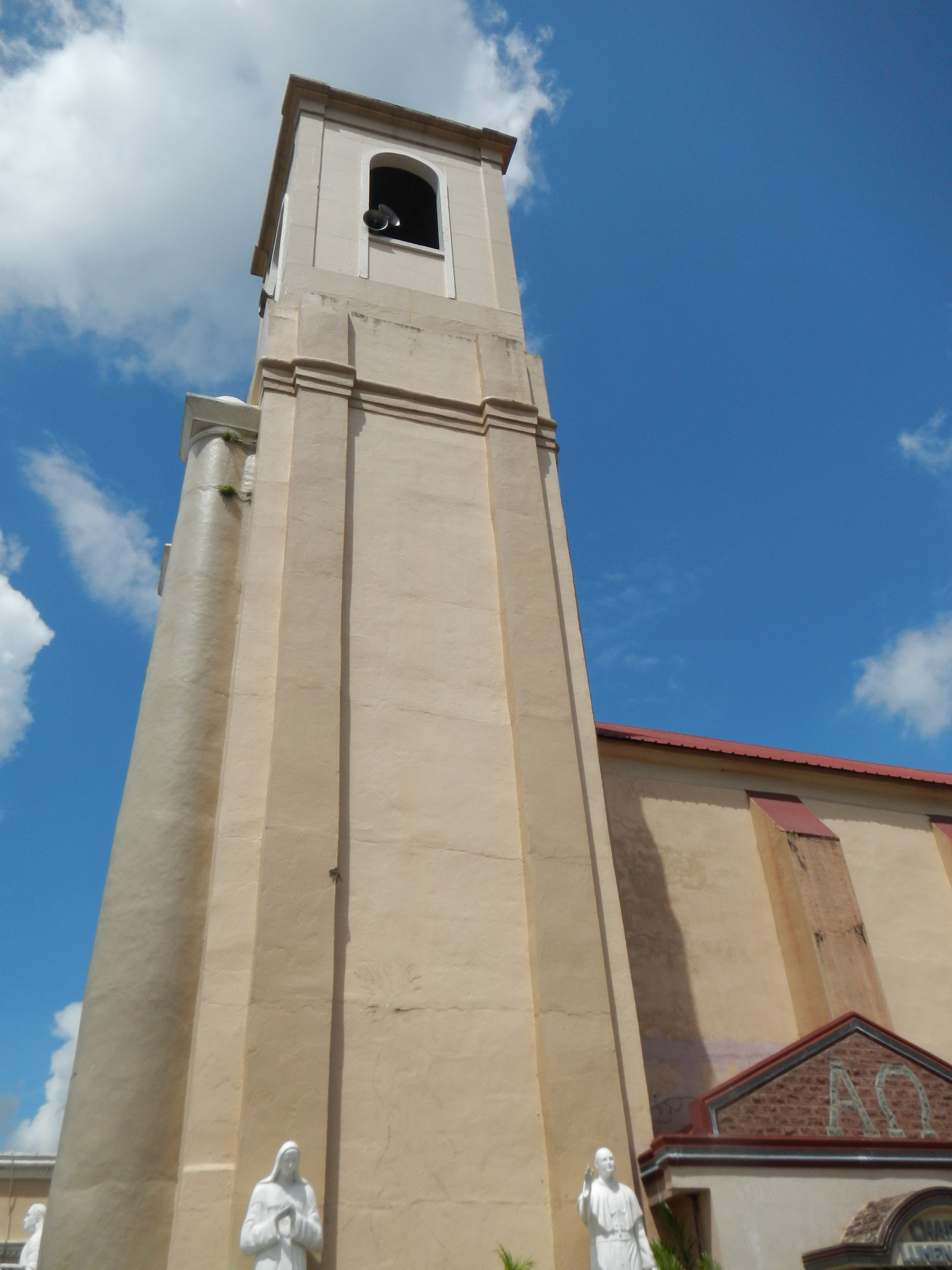
One of the church's belfries

== See also ==
- Archdiocese of Lipa
