= Potu (food) =

Chamorro rice cake

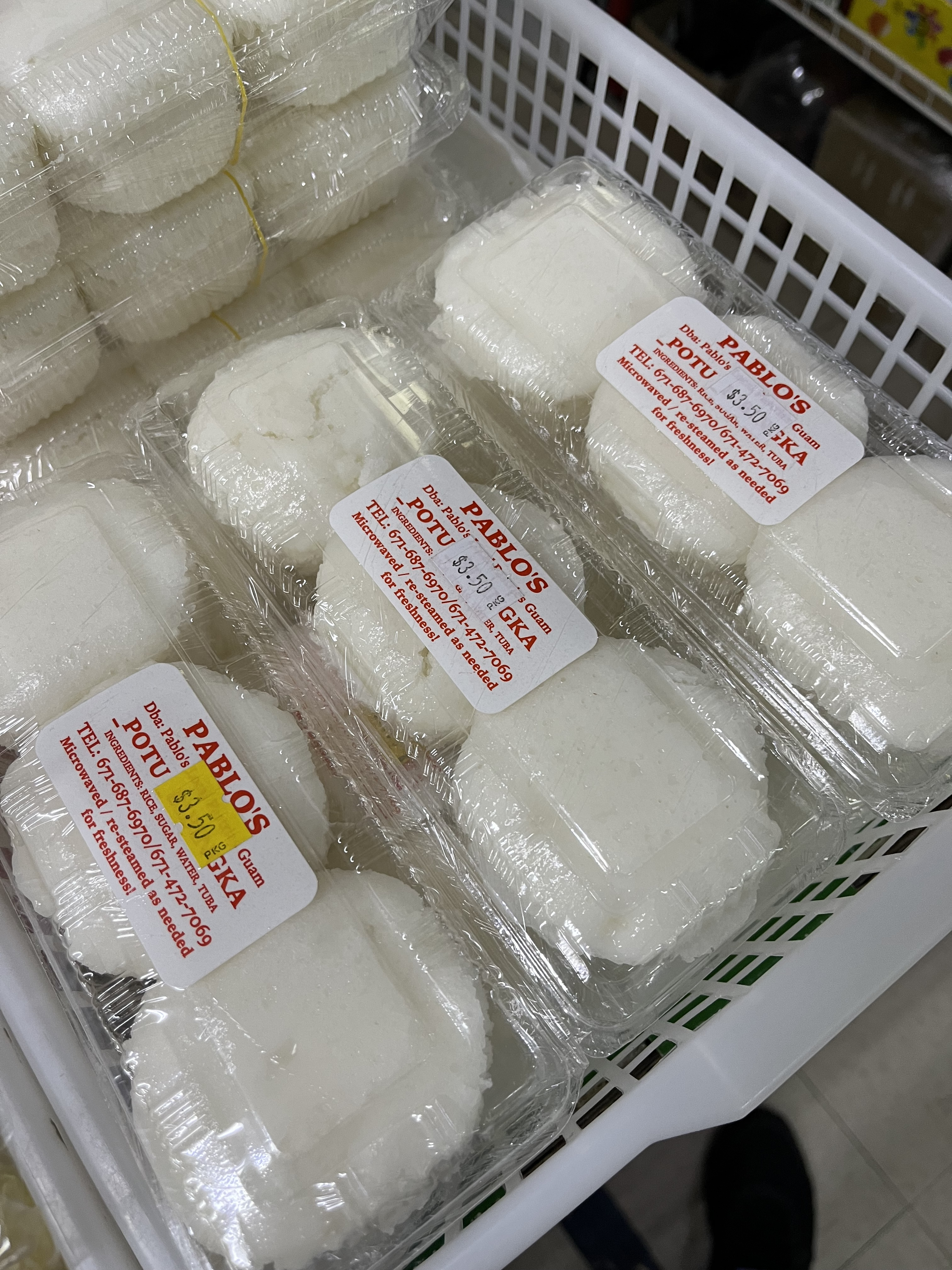
- Alternative names: Poto, Chamorro potu
- Type: Rice cake
- Region or state: Mariana Islands
- Main ingredients: Rice, coconut or tuba (fermented coconut sap)

Potu is a traditional Chamorro rice cake. The dish is often eaten as a breakfast snack or served during fiestas.

== Background ==
Potu was most likely introduced to Guam by Filipino immigrants during the Spanish era; which have their own puto where there are many variations, but in Guam it is mainly made of rice and tuba. It is ultimately from the puttu rice cakes in South India spread via trade across Maritime Southeast Asia (as borrowed into Malay: ڤوتو putu before Philippine languages) reflected in other kinds of sweet rice cake bearing similar names in the region such as the putu piring in Singapore; putu bambu of the Javanese; and the putu mayam, a local name for the idiyappam.

Tuba was introduced to Guam as early as 1668 when Diego Luis de San Vitores arrived.

== Preparation ==
The preparation of potu involves soaking rice overnight in a tuba, a fermented coconut sap beverage that imparts a distinctive flavor. The softened rice is then finely ground into a smooth paste. This mixture is sweetened, flavored with coconut or additional tuba, and shaped into small balls or other forms. Baking powder is added to the mixture prior to cooking. The cakes are steamed until cooked.

Another alternative method is to use rice flour without gluten. Also, another substitute is using coconut vinegar instead of tuba.
