= Buto (disambiguation) =

Buto may refer to:

- Buto, an Ancient Egyptian city
- Buto, another name for the Egyptian goddess Wadjet
- Butoh, a modern Japanese form of dance
- Buto, also called Puto, a Philippine dessert made of rice
