= Mont baung =

Steamed rice cake with coconut shavings

- Type: Snack (mont)
- Place of origin: Myanmar (Burma)
- Region or state: Southeast Asia
- Associated cuisine: Burmese
- Main ingredients: rice flour, jaggery, coconut shavings, red beans
- Similar dishes: Kue mangkok, putu piring

Mont baung (Burmese: မုန့်ပေါင်း; pronounced [mo̰ʊɴ páʊɴ], lit. 'steamed cake') is a traditional Burmese snack or mont.

This snack is a molded rice cake that is typically filled with coconut shavings or red bean cooked in jaggery, and then steamed in a traditional clay pot. It bears a resemblance to the Malaysian and Singaporean putu piring or kuih tutu, though It is comparably larger in size.

Sagaing holds an annual mont baung festival, during the full moon day of Nadaw, at the Weluwun Ngahtatgyi temple precincts (ဝေဠုဝန်ငါးထပ်ကြီးဘုရား).
