= Puttu =

South Indian breakfast dish

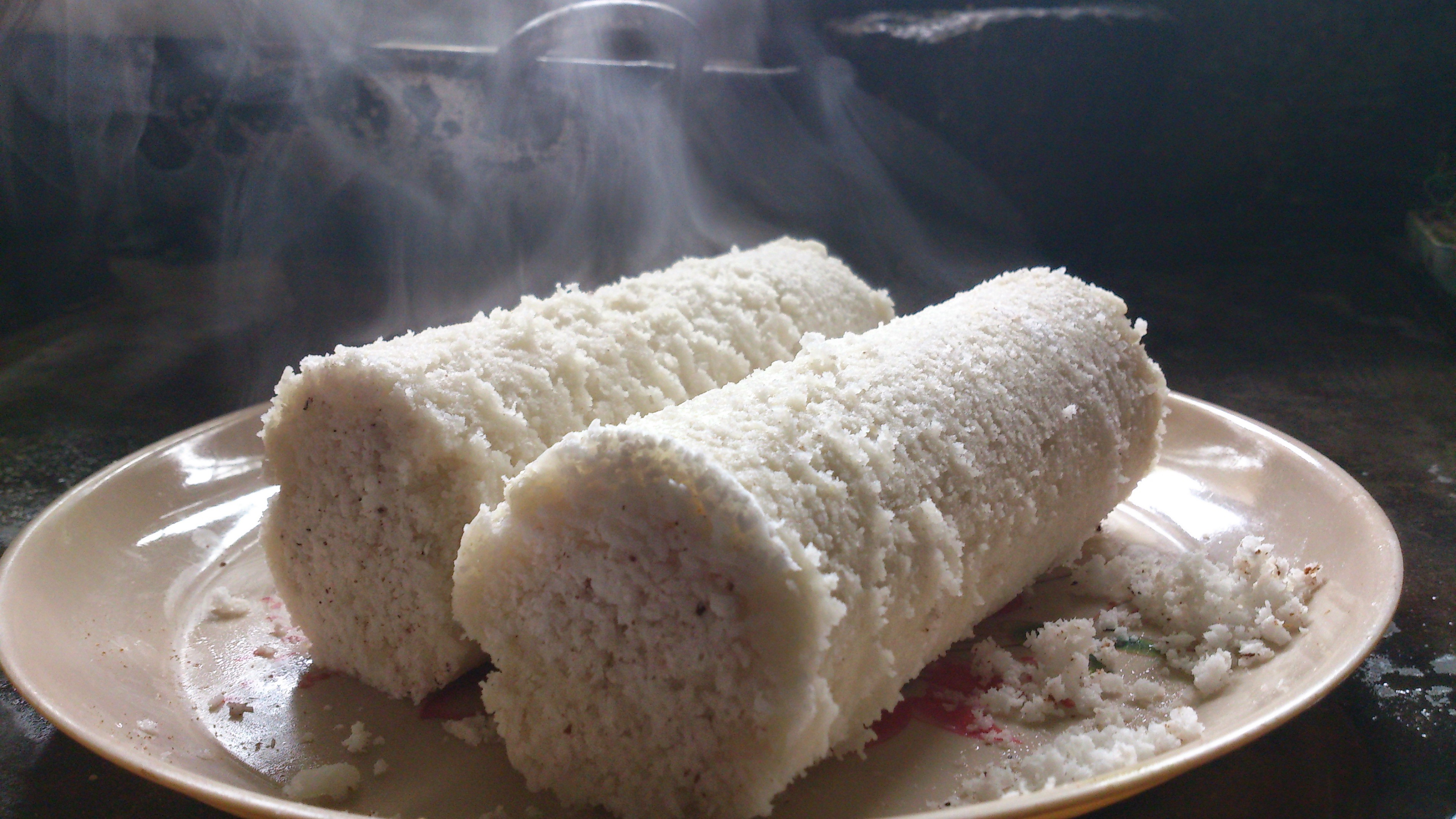
- Course: Breakfast
- Place of origin: Madurai, Tamil nadu, India
- Region or state: Keralam,Tamil Nadu, Northern Province & Eastern Province of Sri Lanka
- Main ingredients: Rice flour, coconut, salt

Puttu or Pittu (pronounced [ˈpuʈːɯ]; Malayalam: പുട്ട്; Tamil: புட்டு , பிட்டு; lit. 'portioned') is a dish native to the South Indian states of Kerala and Tamil Nadu. It is also native to Sri Lanka in the regions of Jaffna, Trincomalee, Batticaloa,Ampara and Negombo, Puttalam. It is a famous breakfast dish among Sri Lankan Tamils. It is made of steamed cylinders of ground rice layered with coconut shavings, sometimes with a sweet or savory filling on the inside. Puttu is typically a breakfast dish served hot with either sweet side dishes such as palm sugar or banana, or savoury side dishes such as chana masala, chutney, rasam, or meat curries.

== Ingredients ==
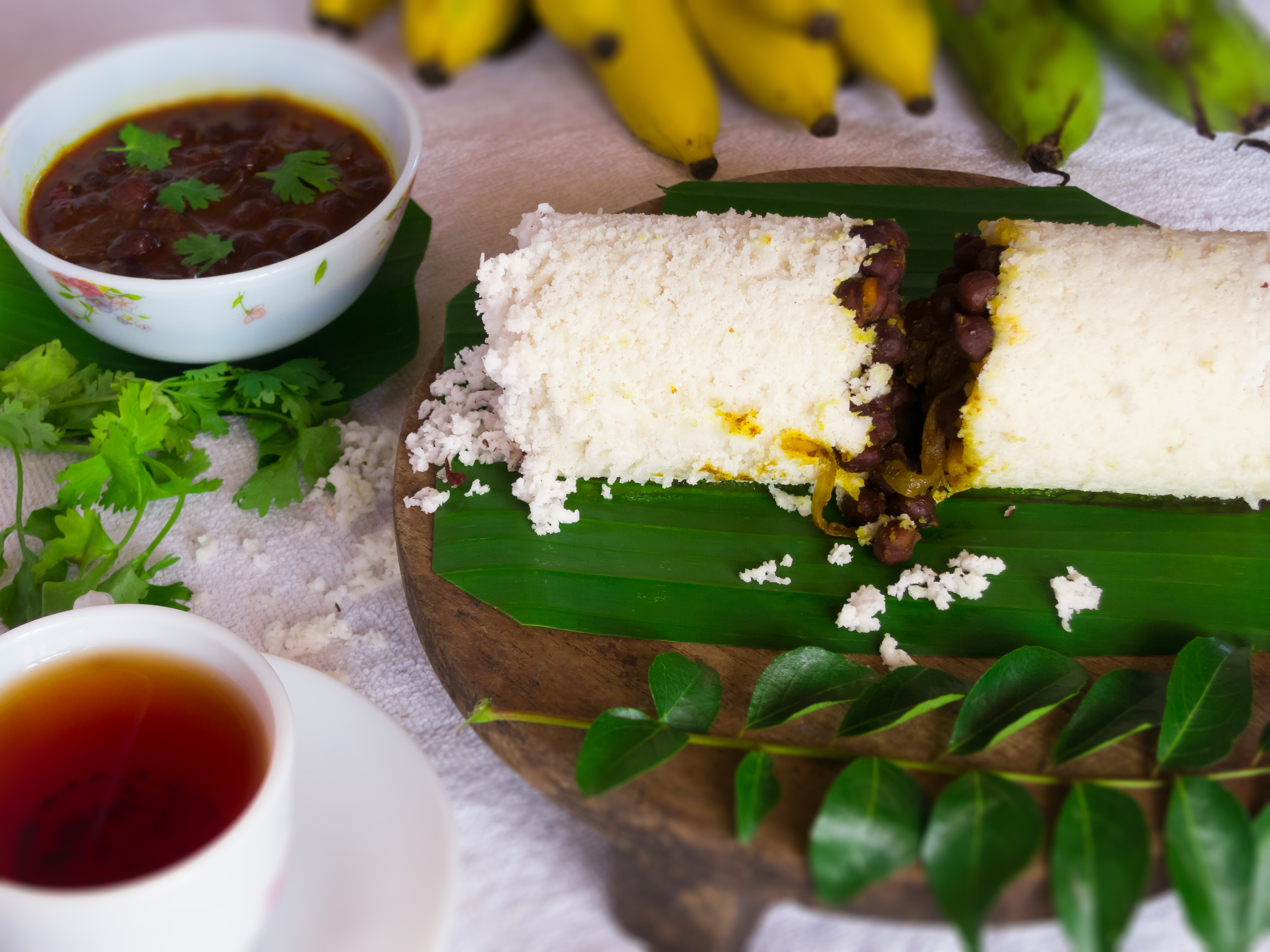
Puttu with chickpea curry

Puttu principally consists of coarsely ground rice, grated coconut, a little salt and water. It is often spiced with cumin, but may have other spices. The Sri Lankan variant is usually made with wheat flour or red rice flour without cumin, whereas the Bhatkal recipes have plain coconut or masala variant made with mutton- or shrimp-flavoured grated coconut.

In Bangladesh, the outside is made of a mixture of rice flour and ground moong dal, while the filling is a mixture of coconut flakes and a type of caramelized sugar that is similar to dulce de leche.

== Preparation ==
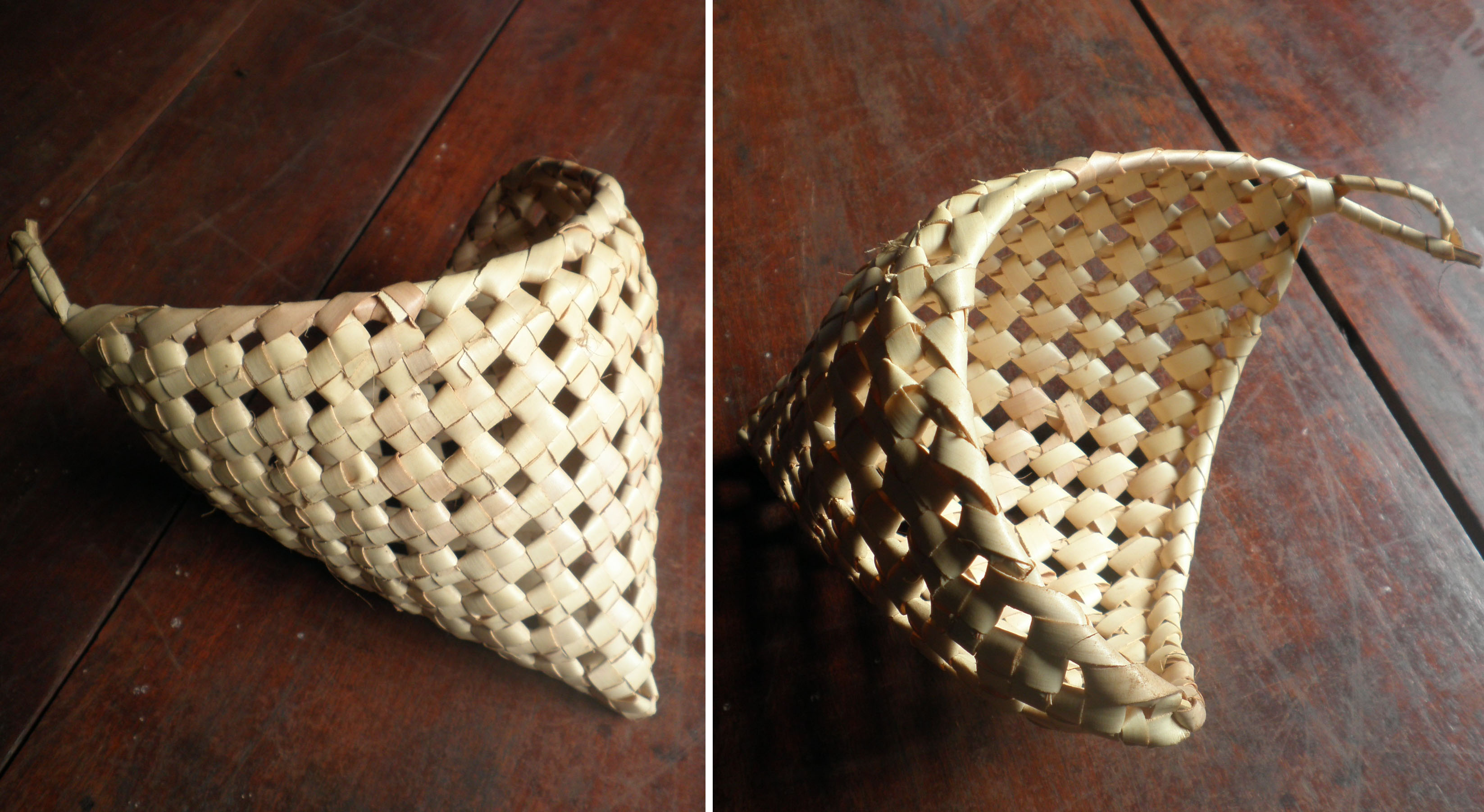
Neetru petti is a palmyra vessel used by Sri Lankan Tamils to steam Puttu.

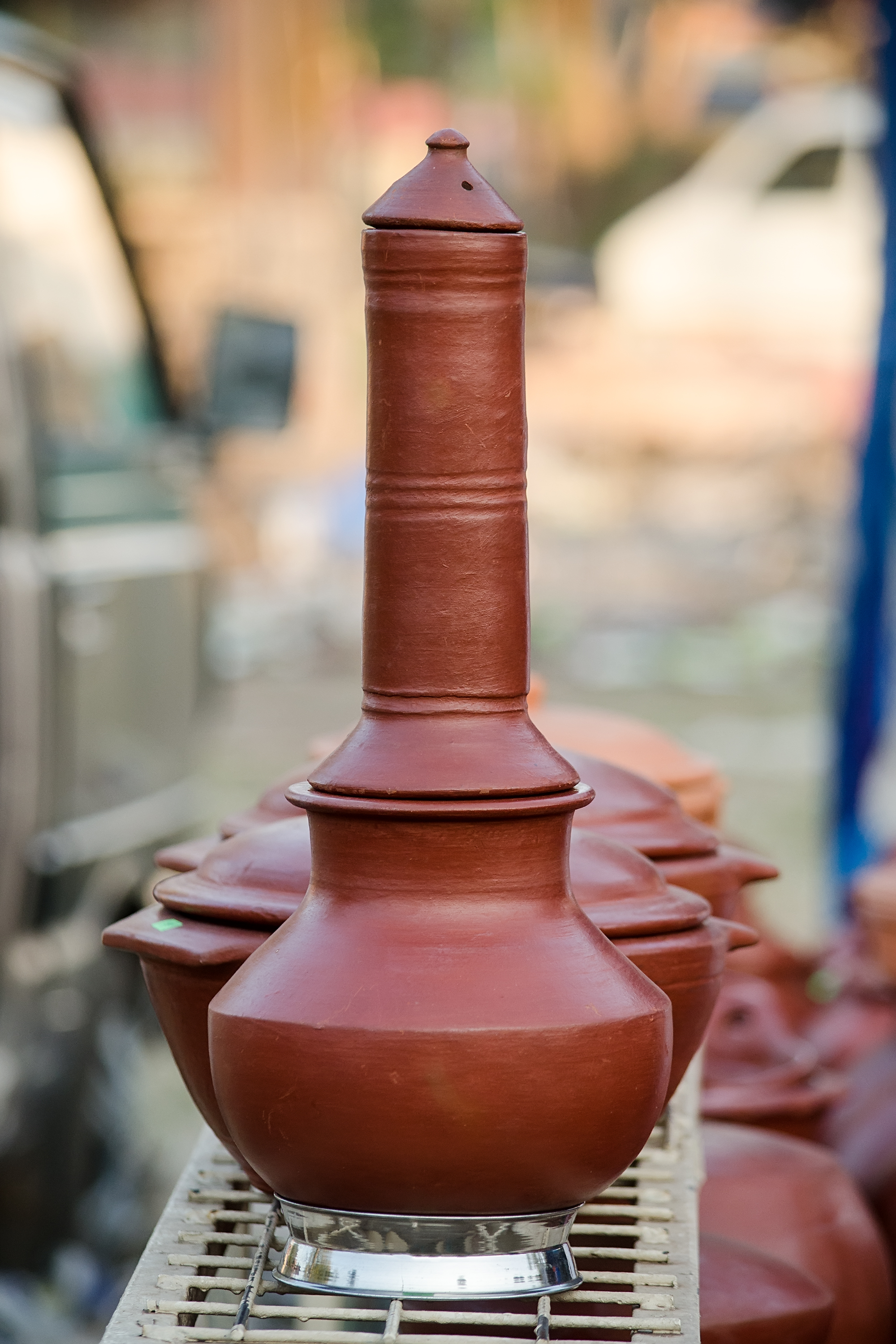
Puttu steaming vessel—side view

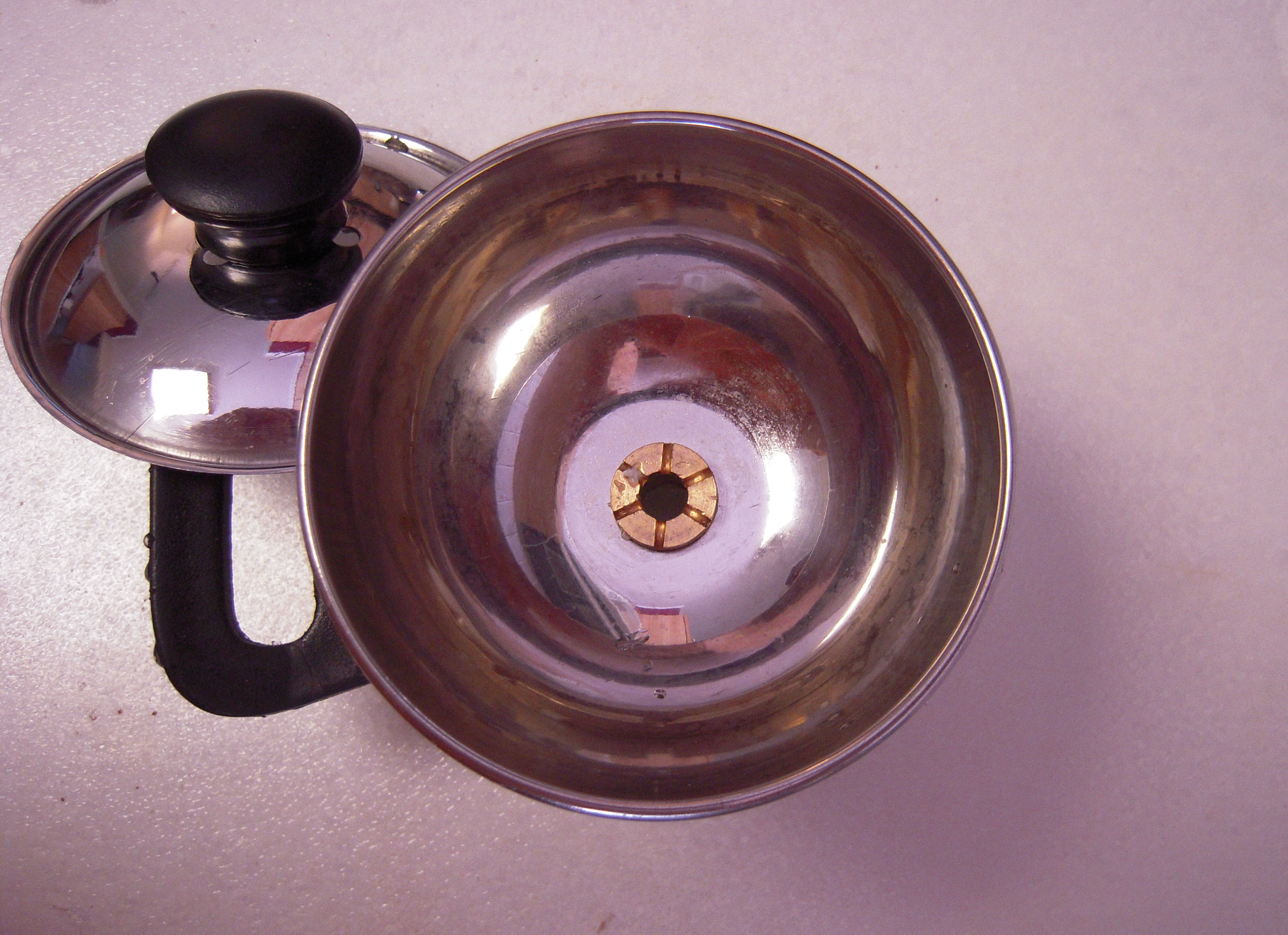
Chirratu Puttu steaming vessel—top view with lid removed

Puttu is made by slowly adding water to ground rice until the correct texture is achieved. Using hot water improves the softness of puttu. It is then spiced, formed and steamed with layers of grated coconut.

Puttu is generally cooked in an aluminium puttu kutti vessel with two sections. The lower section holds water and the upper section holds the puttu, where the rice mixture is inserted with layers of grated coconut. Perforated lids separate the sections to allow the steam to pass between them.

A number of alternative cooking vessels are used, such as traditional vessels where a perforated coconut shell is attached to a section of bamboo, or a chiratta puttu made of a coconut shell or of metal shaped similarly to a coconut shell.

Other types of cooking vessels include a pan similar to an idli pan with small holes in the bottom, and pressure cookers.

== Serving ==
Puttu is often served along with gravies, like fish curry, chicken curry, beef curry or kadala (chickpea) curry, and papadum. Also plantain, jackfruit, mango or banana is commonly served with it. In southern Kerala, people eat puttu accompanied by sweet black coffee.

In Kerala, puttu is served with banana or plantain, kadala curry, payar (green lentils) thoran with papad, fish or meat curry.

In Tamil Nadu and Karnataka, it is served with grated coconut with jaggery made of palm sugar or sugar cane, or with sweetened coconut milk.

In Sri Lanka, pittu is usually accompanied with tripe curry, fish or a meat curry, coconut milk and a sambol.

There are also many improvisations and experiments done on puttu in Kerala. Wheat and maize flours are used instead of rice in certain parts. There are also puttu-specialised restaurants that serve it with different fillings.

== Variations ==
Some variations of puttu use other grains such as wheat flour, ragi (finger millet) flour, tapioca and corn flour. The layered filling of coconut can be replaced by other foods, such as egg curry or banana. Puttu prepared in a ball shape is called manipputtu. Puttu can also be made using bamboo rice.

Muslims in Kerala eat a version of puttu called irachiputtu in which rice is layered with spiced mincemeat. In some local restaurants in Calicut, puttu is prepared in variations that incorporate ingredients such as chicken or carrot, known as chicken puttu and carrot puttu, alongside the plain version.

Puttu is also very common in Mauritius. It is usually sold by hawkers and is served as a snack. It is often misspelled poutou, and should be spelled putu in Mauritian Creole. The ingredients are the same—rice flour, sugar and desiccated coconut, but cooked in metal cylinders.

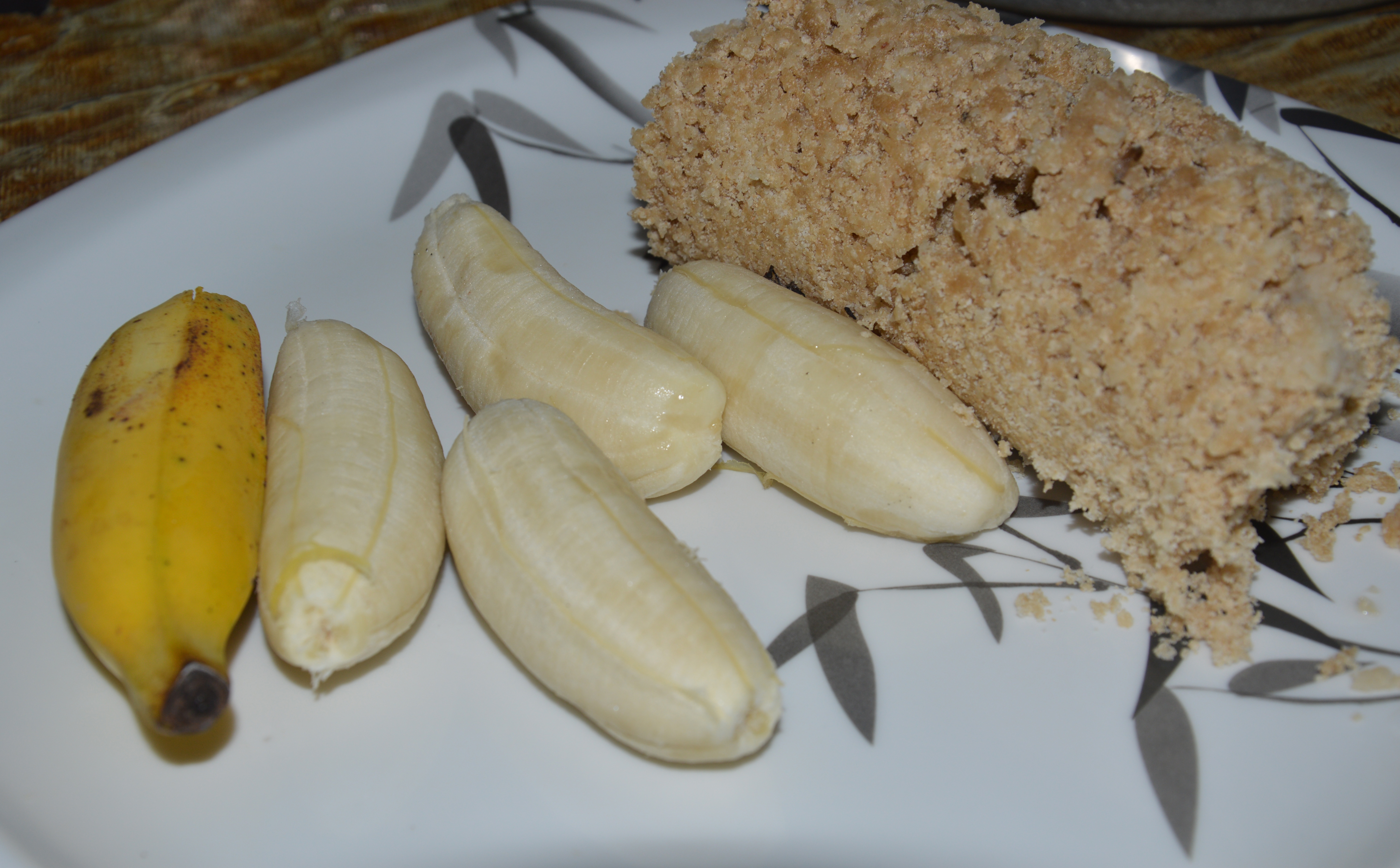
Wheat puttu with bananas

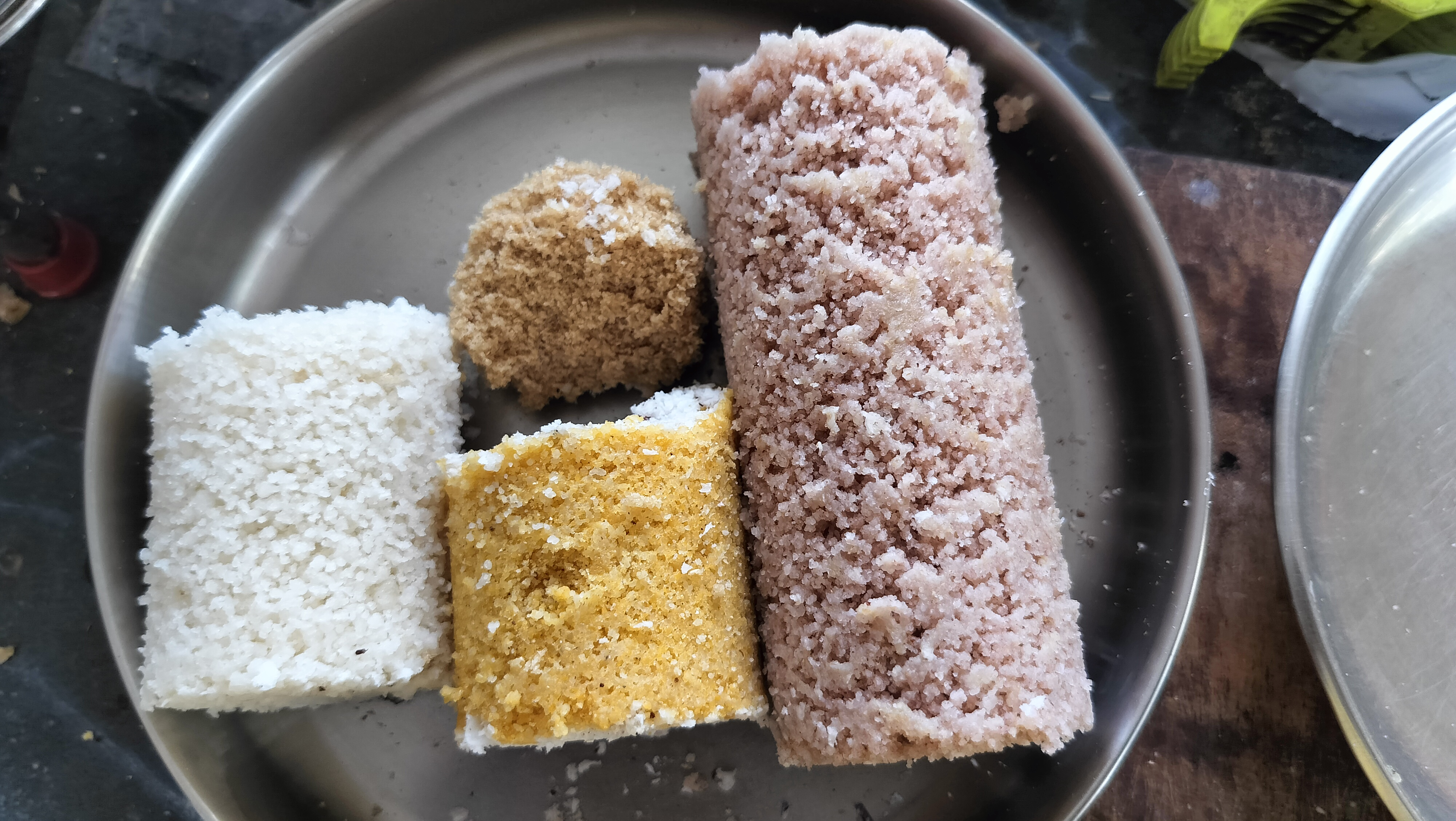
puttu made with rice, wheat, ragi, chemba rice

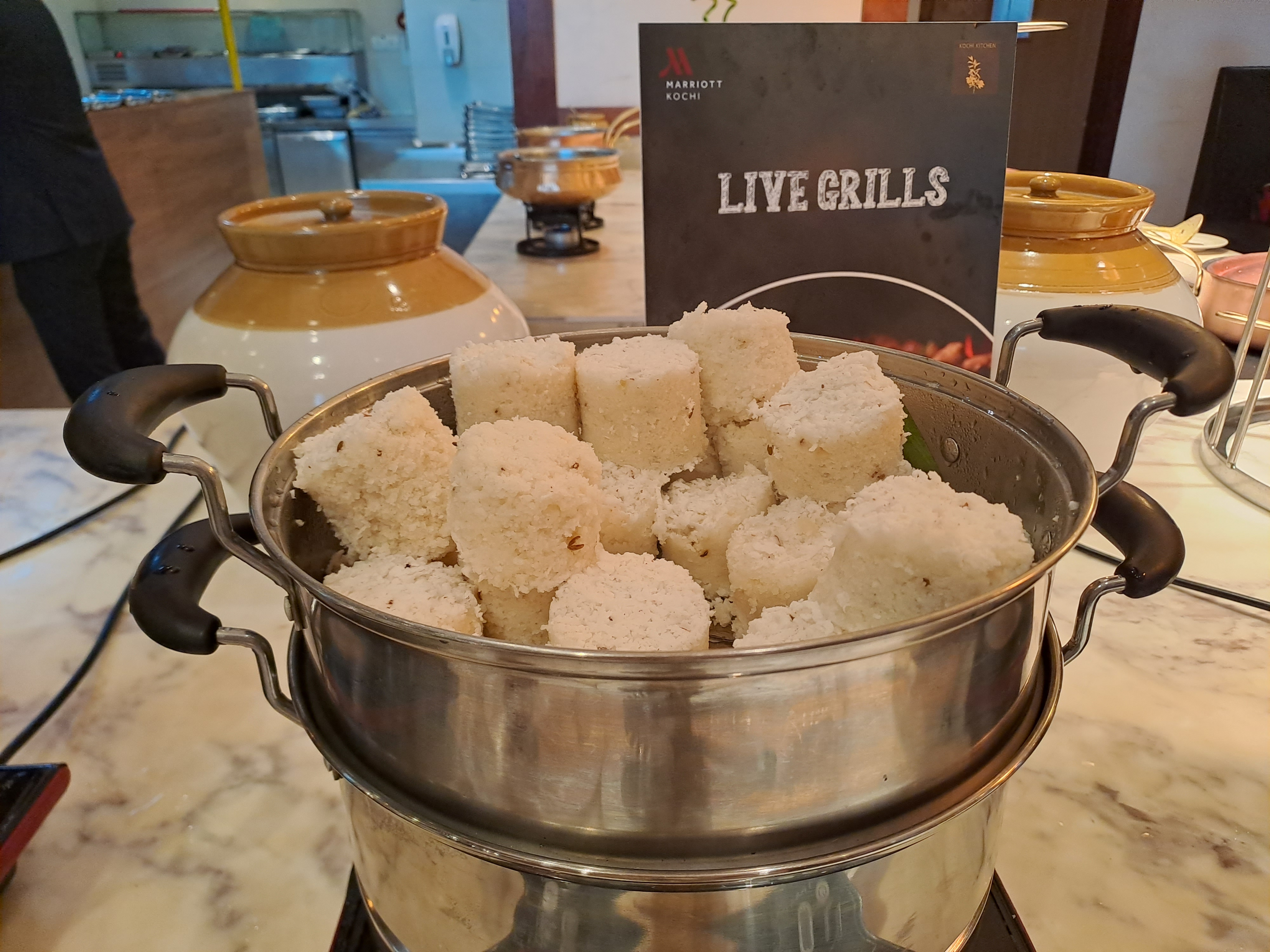
Puttu served in fine dining restaurants

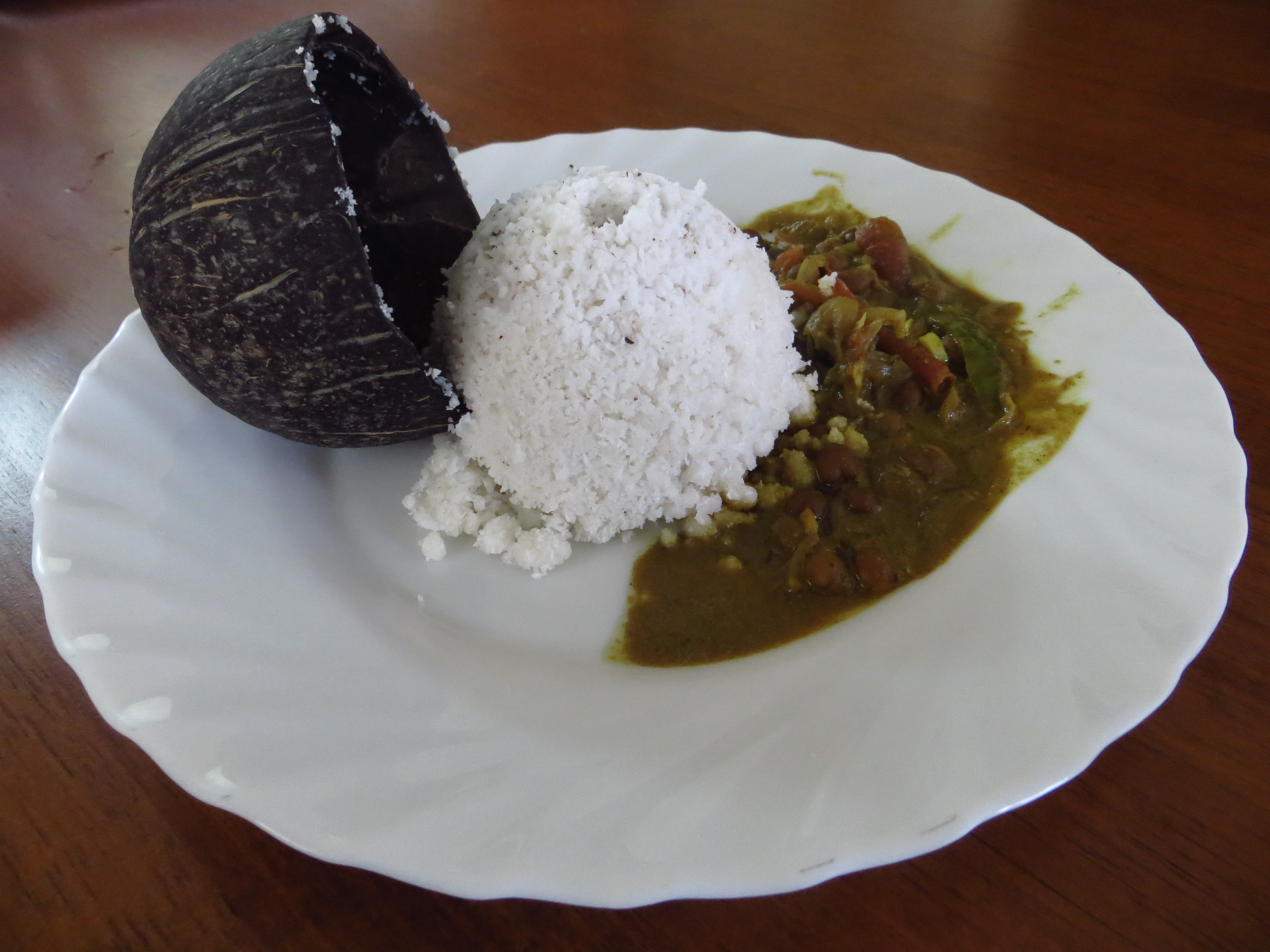
Chiratta puttu

== In Hindu mythology ==
In Tamil Nadu, puttu is mentioned in a common legend and related festival involving Shiva. This legend is known as the puttuku mann sumantha lilai (translated from Tamil as "the divine game of moving sand in exchange for puttu"). It describes how, following a flood of the Vaigai River, King Arimarthana of the Pandya dynasty ordered his subjects to carry sand to plug breaches in the river bank. An aged woman named Vanthiammai is said to have been unable to carry out this duty, whereupon Shiva is said to have appeared in the guise of a manual laborer named Chokkan. The deity offered to move the sand in her stead, in exchange for puttu, which would serve as his wage. After eating the puttu, Chokkan instead fell asleep on the river bank. Seeing this, the king became enraged and struck him with a cane. It is claimed that instead of harming Chokkan, the cane blow was felt by all bystanders, including the king himself. Chokkan subsequently revealed his true form as Shiva, granted Vanthiammai moksha, and caused the floods to recede. This myth is re-enacted yearly during the puttu tiruvila portion of the Avani Mula festival at the Meenakshi Sundareswarar Temple in the Puttuthoppu region of Arappalayam, a neighborhood of Madurai. Puttu is commonly sold and distributed at the festival.

== World record attempt ==
In 2006, students of the Oriental school of Hotel Management in Wayanad in north Kerala made a 10-foot-long puttu. They cooked the giant puttu in a specially designed 12-foot-long aluminium mould, using 20 coconuts and 26 kg of powdered rice. It took about one and a half hours to cook.

== Similar dishes ==
In Maritime Southeast Asia, there are numerous similar dessert dishes known as kue putu among the Javanese in east of Java and its diaspora in Malay Peninsula's Johore, putu piring in Singapore, and puto bumbong in Philippines. They vary by preparation and ingredients but are also steamed in bamboo tubes and are served with sugar and grated coconut.

In Indonesia, kue putu is characteristically green due to the use of pandan flavoring. It is commonly found being sold by traveling vendor carts together with klepon, which is actually ball-shaped kue putu.

In the Philippines, puto bumbong is deep purple in color due to the use of a unique rice variety called pirurutong. They are culturally significant as a common traditional Christmas dessert. Puto in the Philippines is also a general term for traditional steamed rice cakes.

== See also ==
- Bhapa pitha
- Cuisine of Kerala
- Idli
- Kue putu
- List of steamed foods
- Puto
- Sunga Pitha
- Tamil cuisine
