= Kue putu =

Southeast Asian rice cake

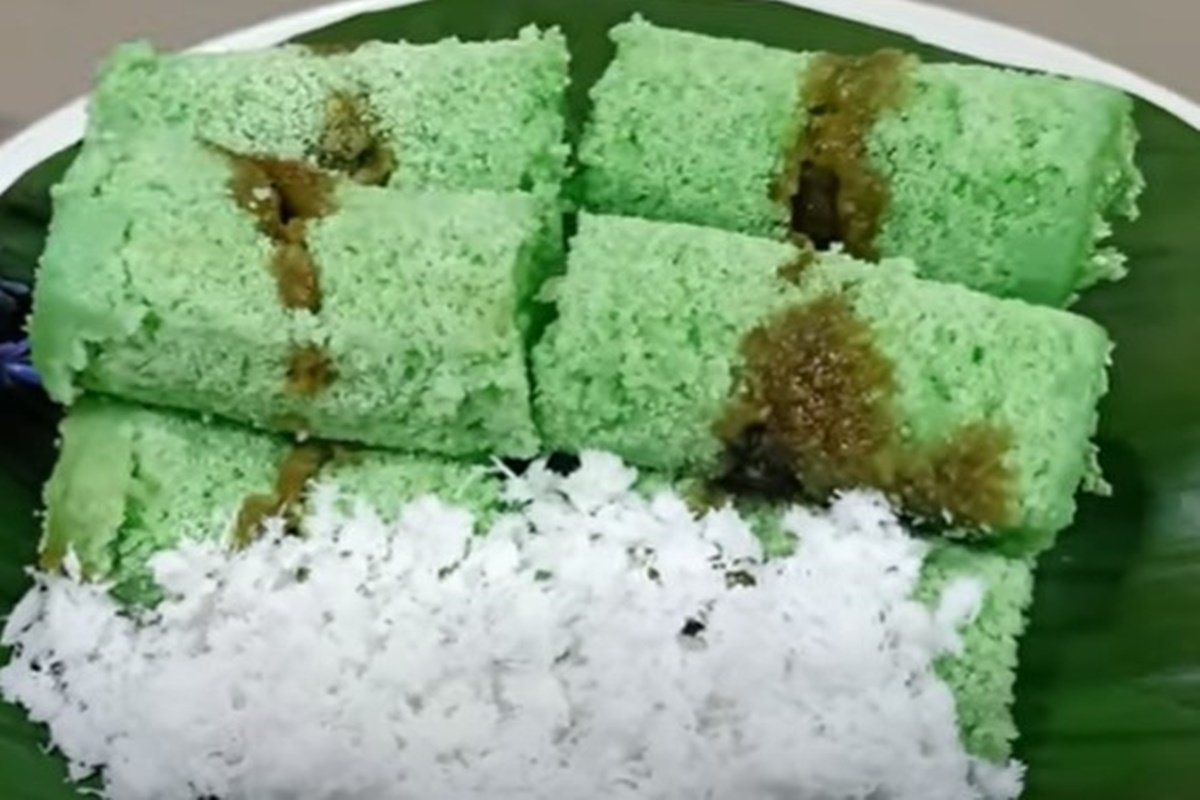
- Kue Putu, filled with palm sugar and served with desiccated coconut.
- Alternative names: Putu bambu, putu bumbung
- Type: Sweet dumpling
- Course: Dessert, snack
- Place of origin: Indonesia, Malaysia, Philippines
- Region or state: East Java, Johor
- Serving temperature: Warm or room temperature
- Main ingredients: Rice flour, palm sugar, coconut
- Similar dishes: Puttu, puto, puto bumbong, kueh tutu, mache

Kue putu or putu bambu is an Indonesian, Malaysian and Filipino rice cake. It is made of rice flour and coloured green with pandan leaves, filled with palm sugar, steamed in bamboo tubes (hence the name), and served with desiccated coconut. This traditional bite-sized snack is commonly found in maritime Southeast Asia, particularly in Java, where it is called putu bumbung. In Malaysia it is called putu bambu, and in the Philippines, it is called puto bumbong.

The word putu is believed to be derived from Tamil puttu. Kue putu is usually sold by street vendors and can be found in traditional markets, along with other kues. Kue putu can also be found in the Netherlands due to its colonial ties with the Dutch East Indies.

== Ingredients and cooking method ==
It consists of rice flour with green pandan leaf colouring, filled with ground palm sugar. These green coconut-rice flour ingredients with palm sugar filling are filled into a bamboo tube container. Subsequently, the filled bamboo tubes are steamed in a steam cooker with small holes opening to blow the hot steam. The cooked tubular cakes were then pushed out from the bamboo tube container and served with grated coconut.

Kue putu

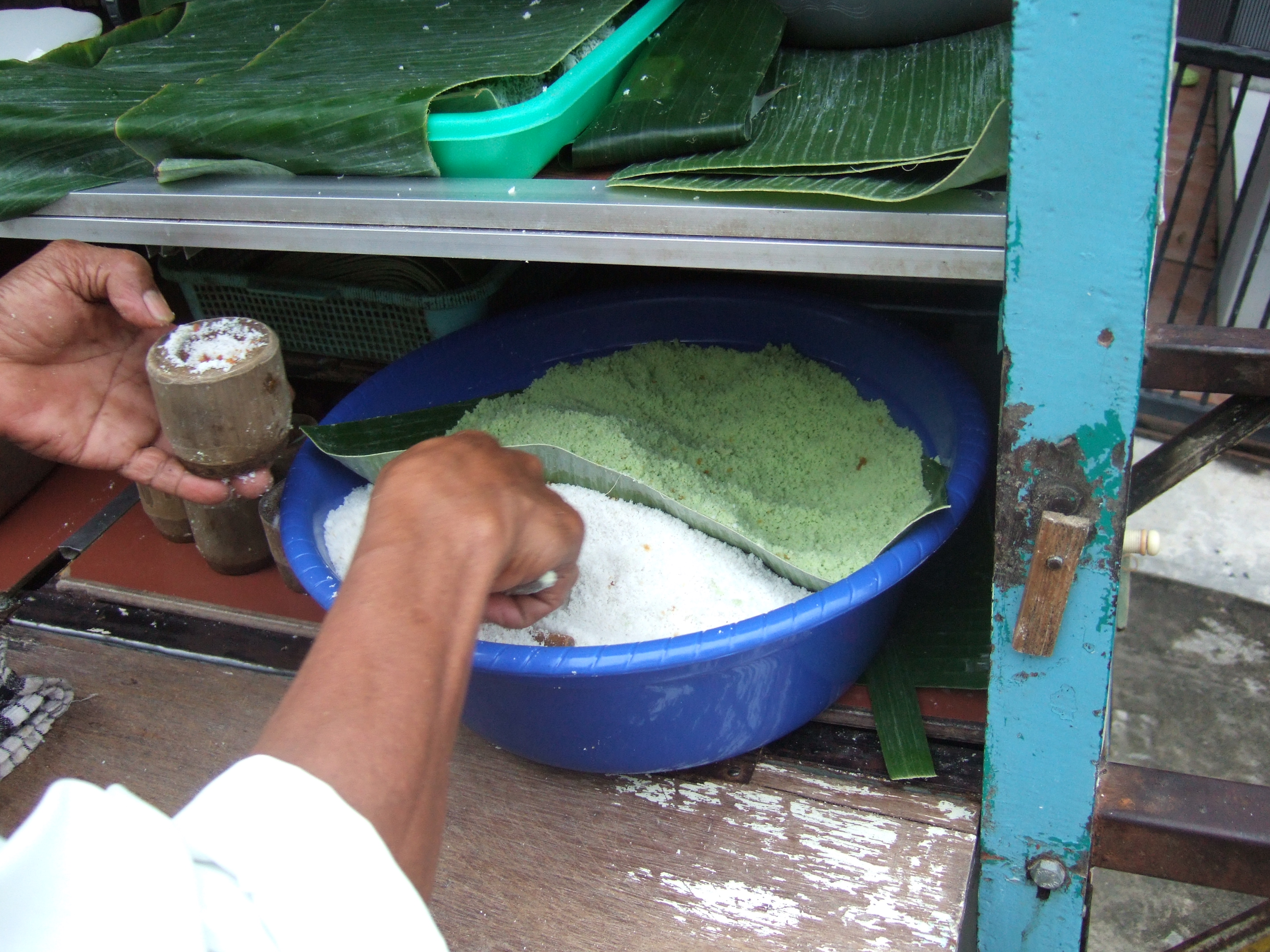
Bamboo tube being filled with rice flour

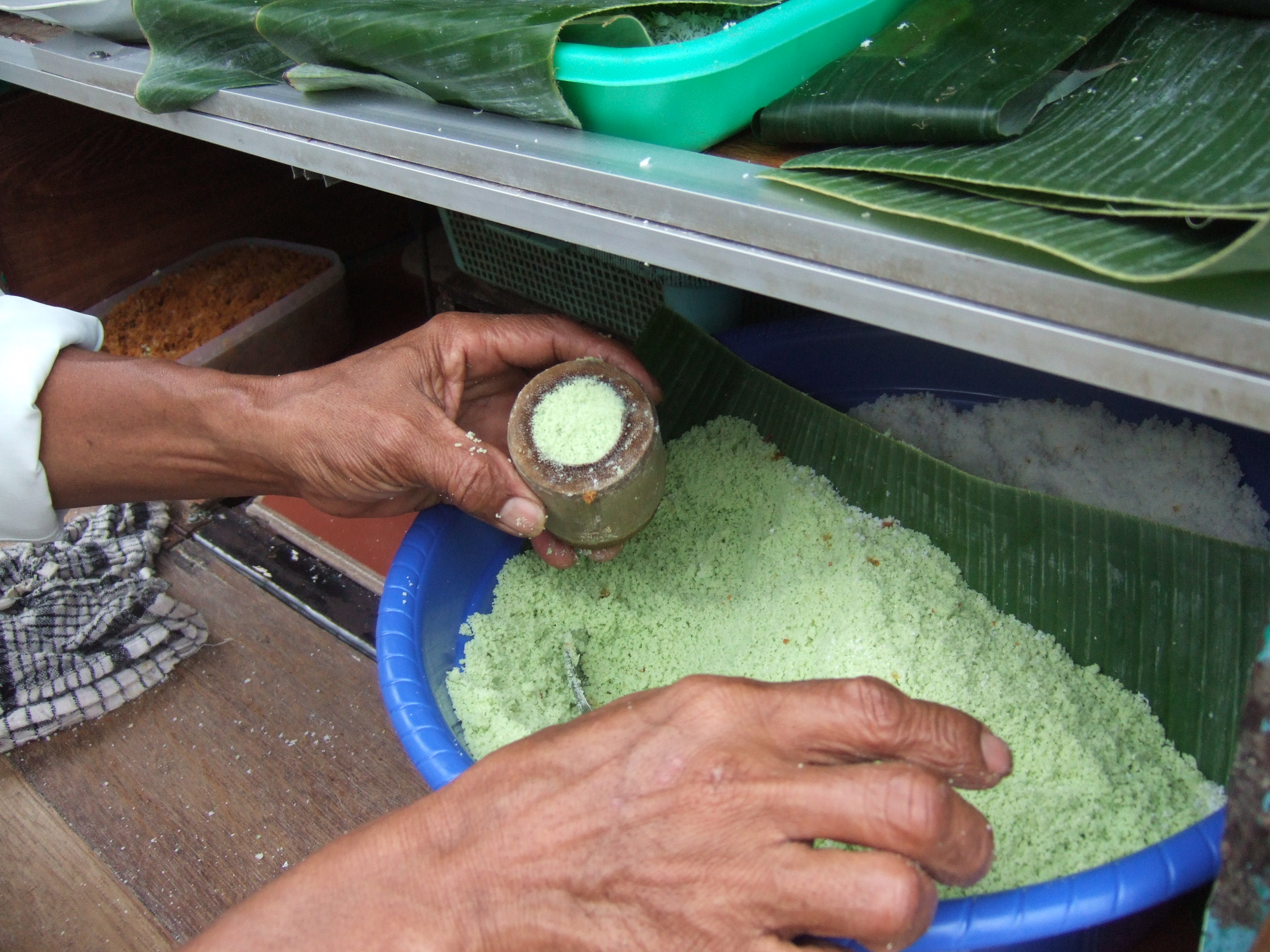
Filled bamboo tube

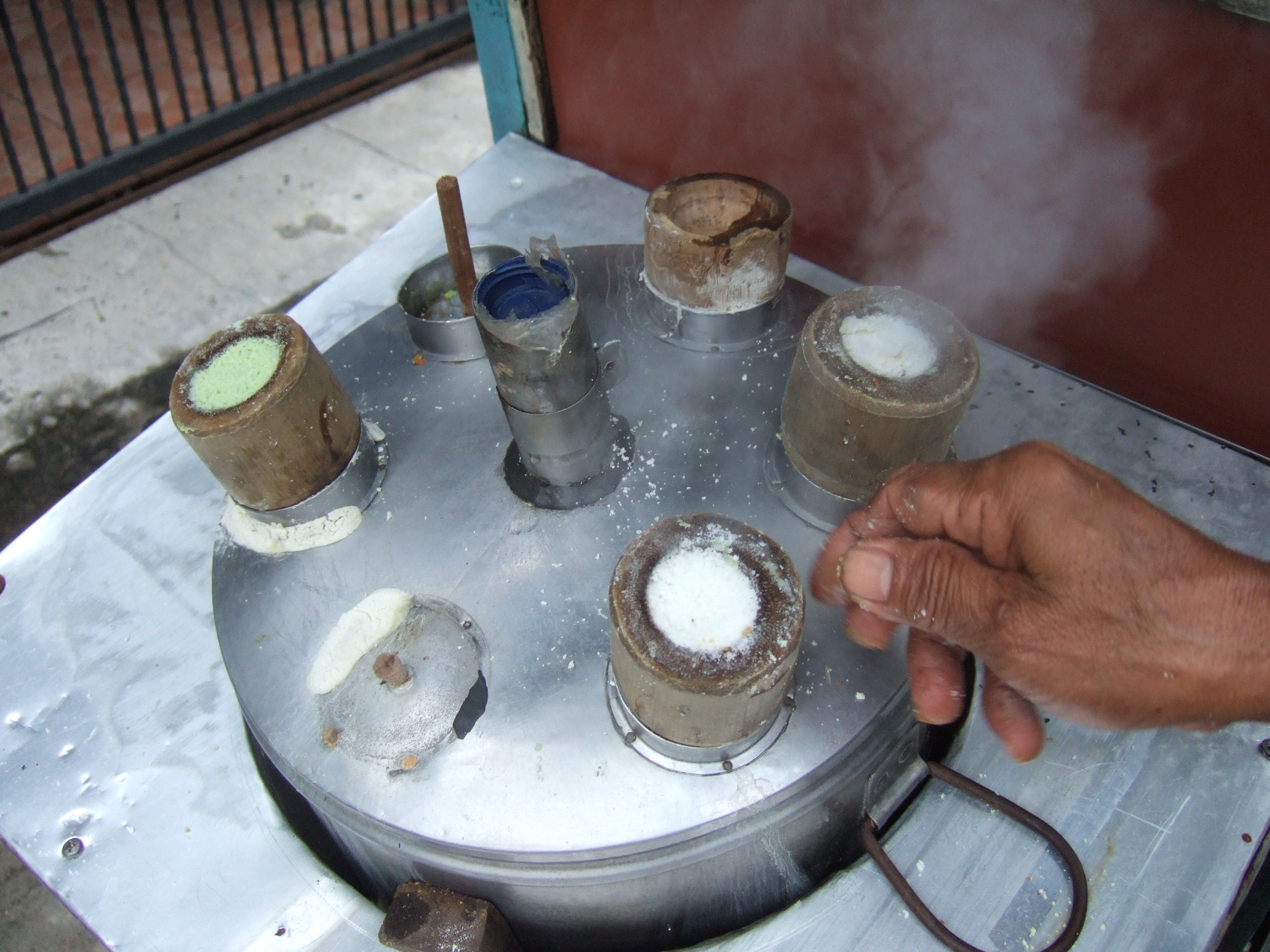
Kue putu being steamed

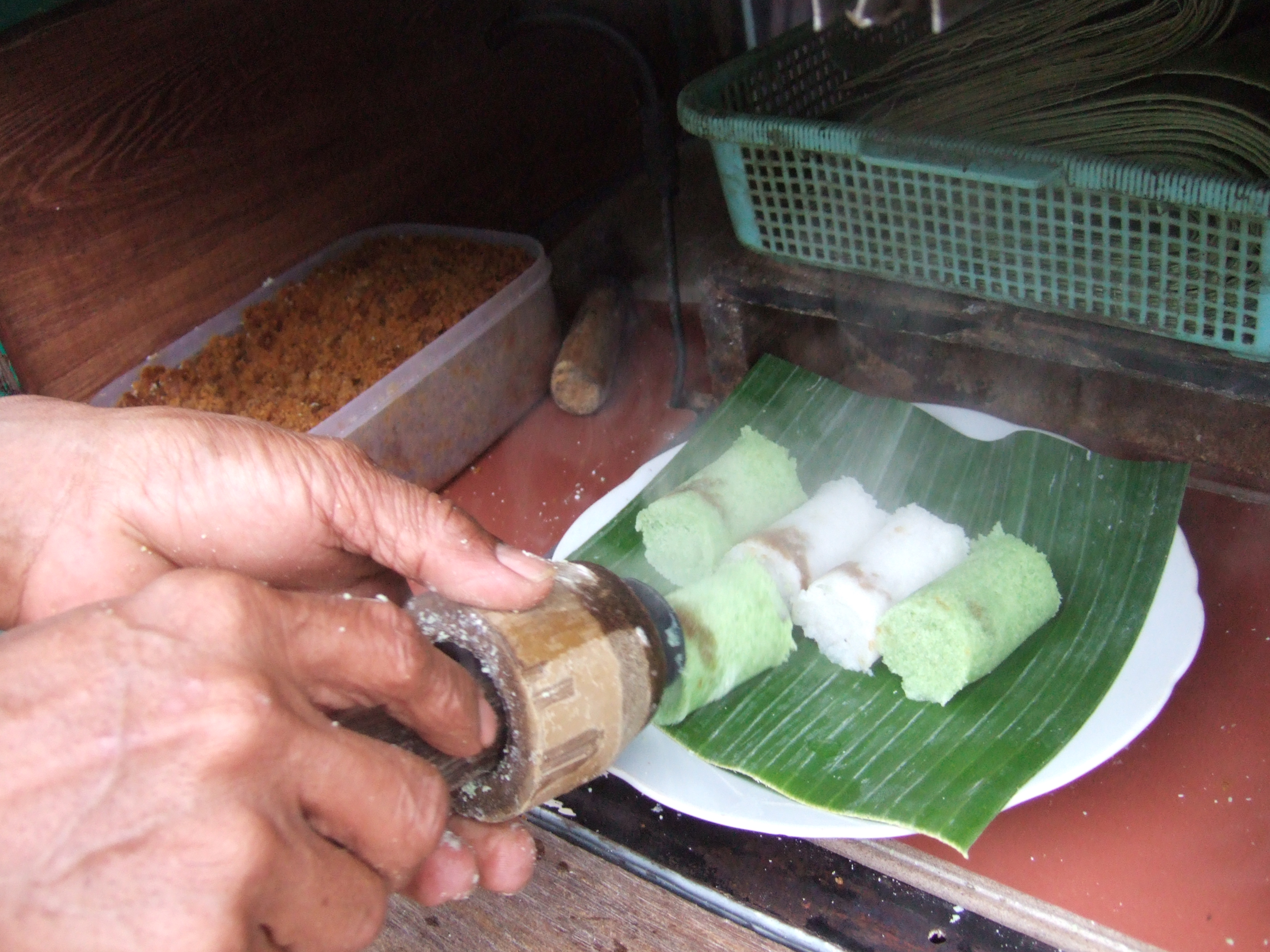
Cooked putu pushed out from the bamboo tube

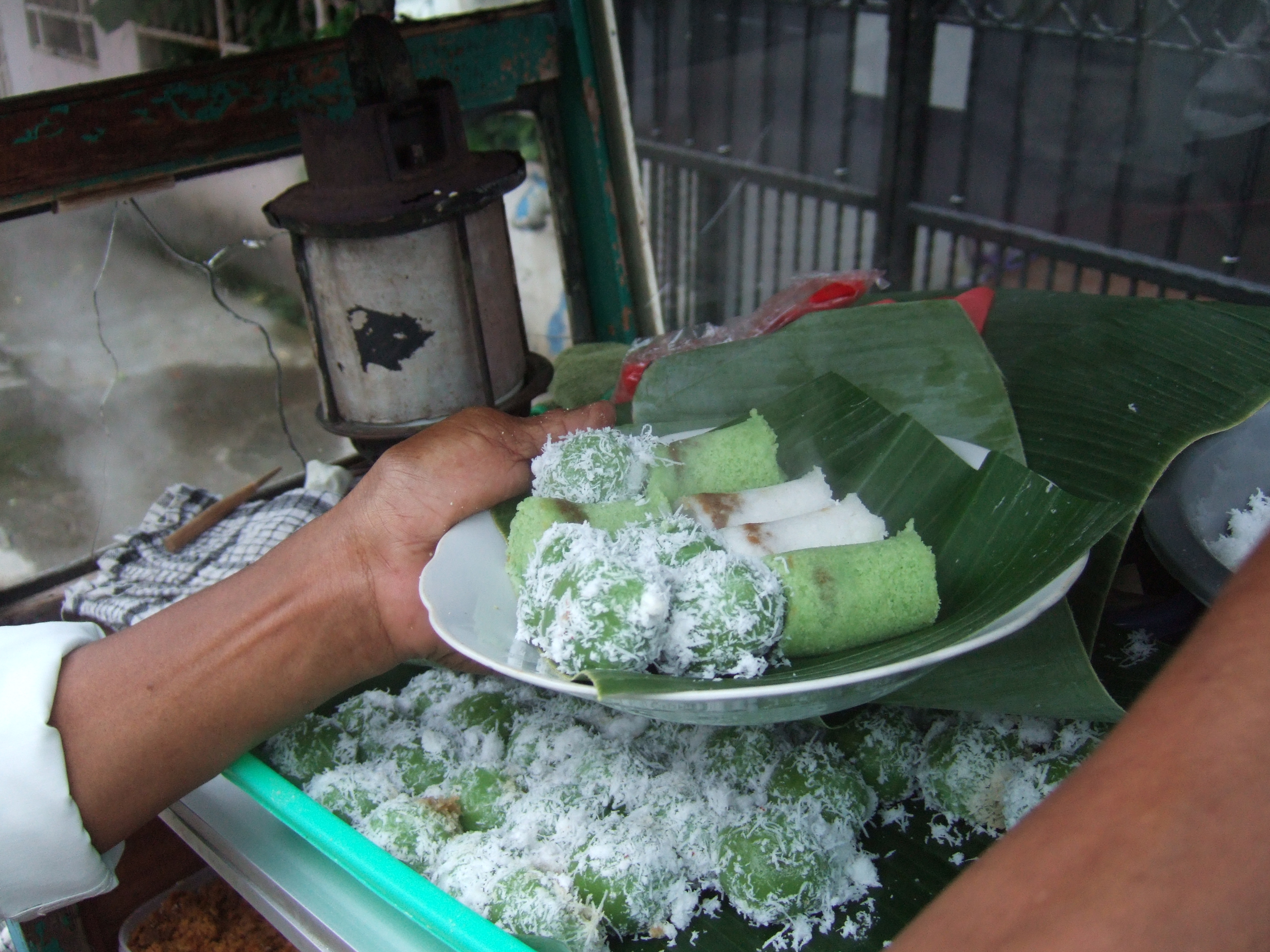
Kue putu, often sold with klepon

This set of images shows the process of kue putu making in Indonesia.

== Etymology and variations ==
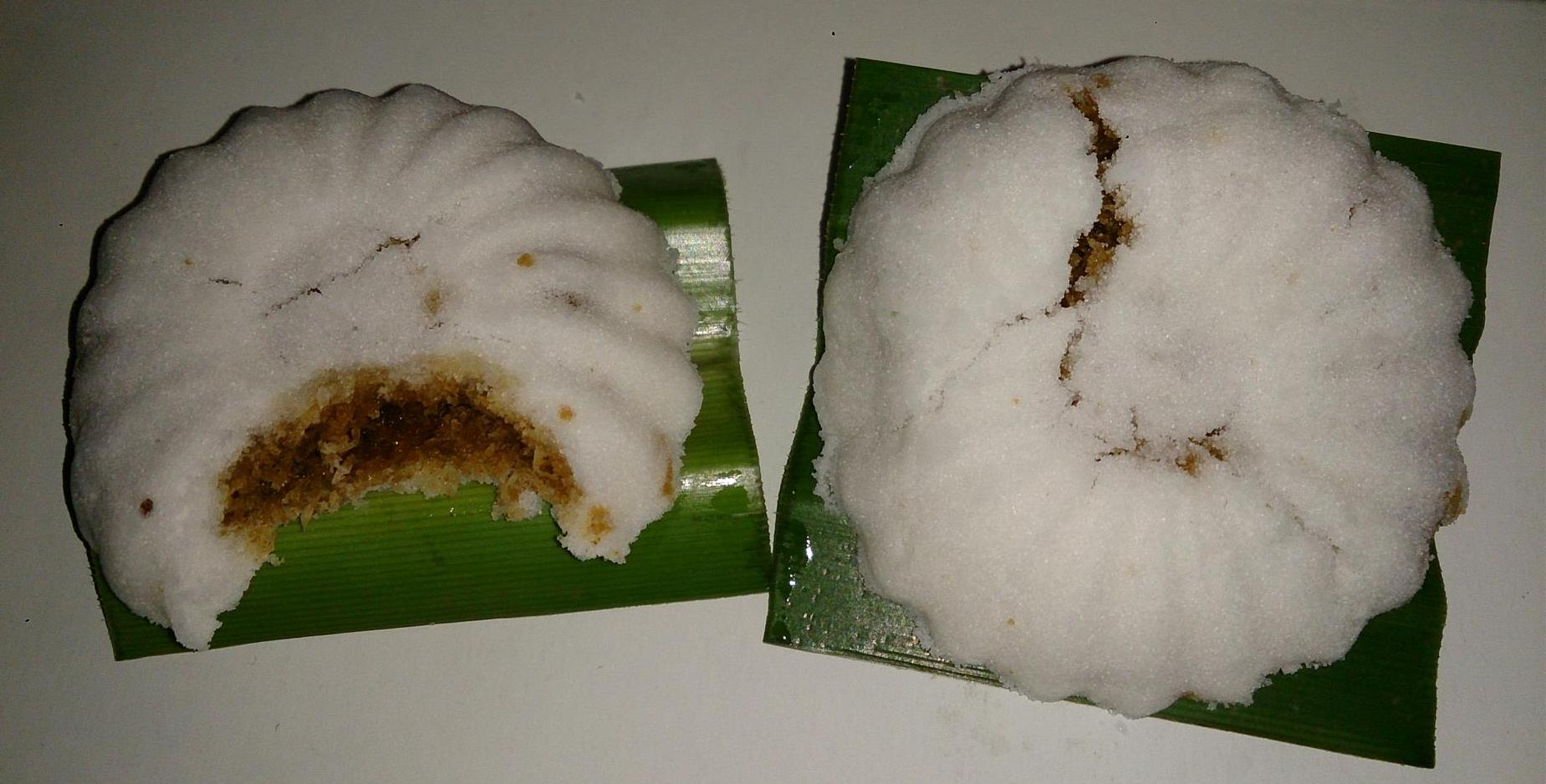
Singaporean kueh tutu or also called putu mangkok in Indonesia

In Javanese, bumbung means "bamboo" or "a hollow cylindrical object; a tube". As the dish began to spread across the country, the name was later translated to Indonesian putu bambu (bambu: "bamboo"). Hence the name, as it is made by filling a bamboo tube with the ingredients (see the above picture).

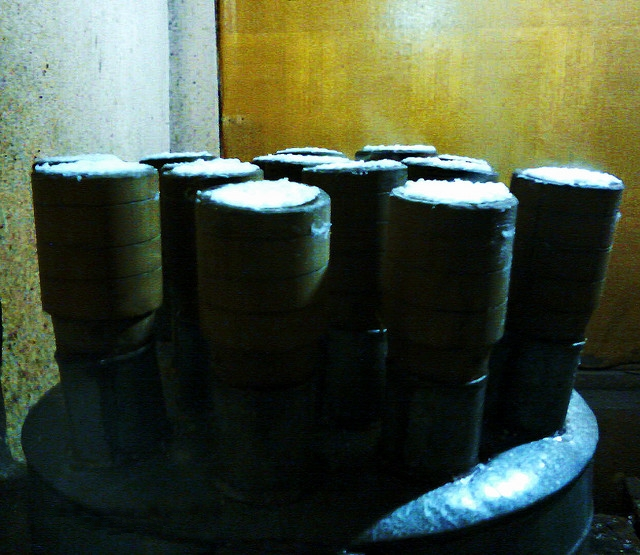
Putu bambu pipes in a steamer

Variations of kue putu are often in the shapes or fillings. Kue putu of different shapes with almost identical ingredients, fillings and recipes exist in Southeast Asia.

The white-colored, flatter disc-shaped putu is called putu piring (Malay for disc/plate putu) and is more common in Malaysia, Kerala and Sri Lanka, while thicker and more round white- or green-coloured putu mangkok (Indonesian for bowl putu) is found more in Indonesia. In Singapore, however, putu mangkok is called kueh tutu.

Traditionally kue putu is filled with palm sugar. Today, however, several new variations are using different fillings, such as chocolate or abon (beef floss).

In Indonesia, a well-known backronym of putu is "pencari uang tenaga uap", lit. 'steam-powered money maker'.

== Similar dishes ==
In the Philippines, puto refers to a class of pastries made by steaming rice. A type of puto very similar to kue putu is puto bumbóng, which is also cooked in bamboo tubes (Tagalog: bumbóng). However, puto bumbóng does not use pandan and is traditionally cooked from whole grains, rather than rice flour. It also uses a special, purple variety of glutinous rice called pirurutóng which gives it a deep, purple colour (nowadays achieved with food dye).

In India (Kerala, Tamil Nadu and Karnataka) and Sri Lanka, a similar dish is known as puttu or pittu, though the dessert variety is only prevalent in Tamil Nadu.

== See also ==
- Puttu
- Puto
- Kueh tutu
- Kue
- Klepon
- Kue lapis
- Getuk
- List of steamed foods
