= Puto (food) =

Type of steamed rice cake

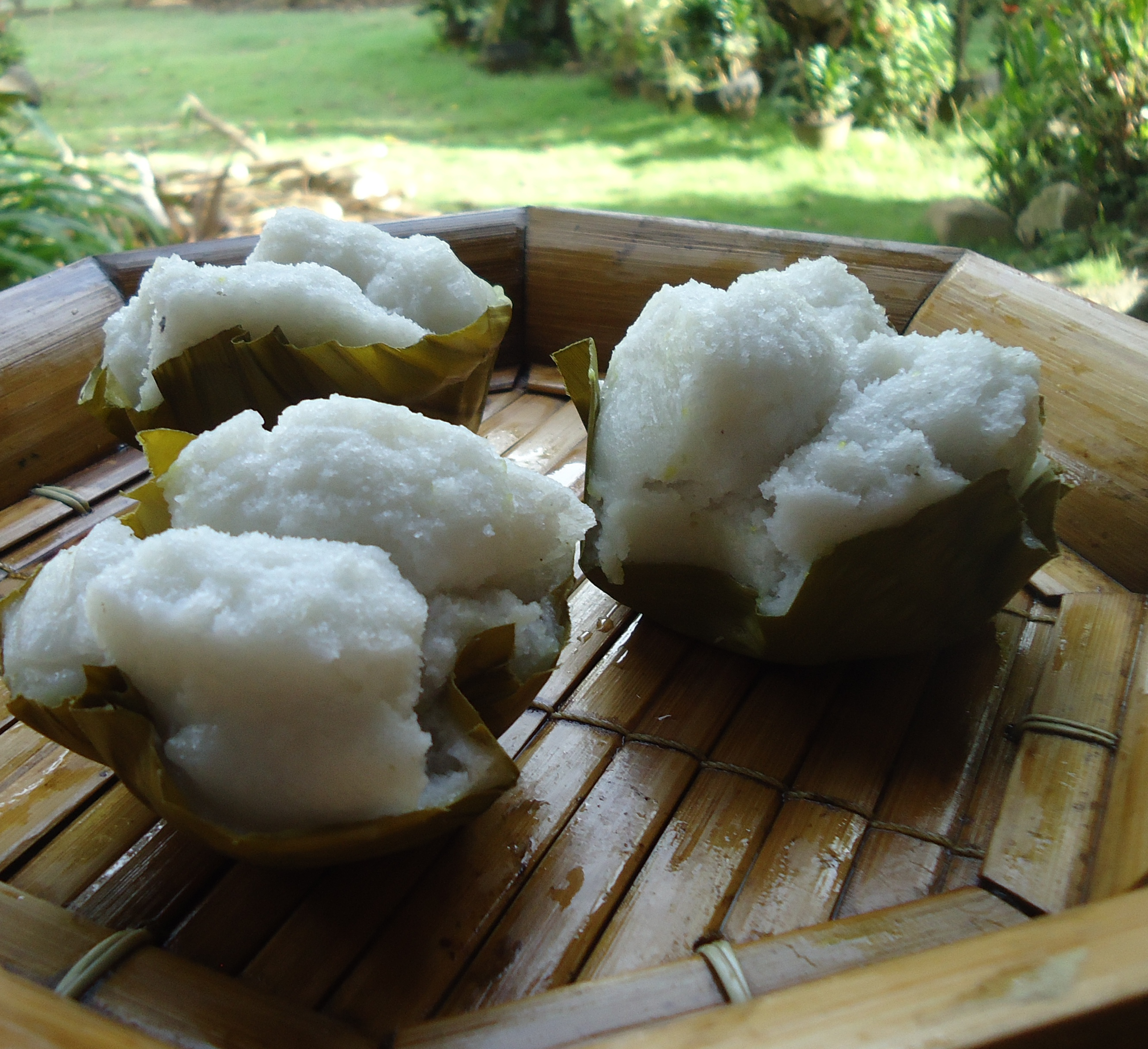
- Banana leaf-lined puto freshly steamed
- Alternative names: Kue putu
- Course: Dessert, breakfast
- Place of origin: The Philippines
- Serving temperature: Hot, warm, or room temperature
- Main ingredients: Rice
- Food energy (per serving): 587 kcal (2,460 kJ)
- Similar dishes: Bibingka, panyalam, puttu, kue putu, "idli", "Bhapa pitha"

Puto is a Filipino steamed rice cake, traditionally made from slightly fermented rice dough (galapong). It is eaten as is or as an accompaniment to a number of savoury dishes (most notably, dinuguan). Puto is also an umbrella term for various kinds of indigenous steamed cakes, including those made without rice. It is a sub-type of kakanin (rice cakes).

== History ==
Puto derives from the puttu rice cakes in south of the Indian subcontinent which may have come via South Indian trade with the Malayosphere (as borrowed into Malay: ڤوتو putu before Philippine languages) reflected in many kinds of sweet rice cake bearing similar names in the Southeast Asian region such as the putu piring in Singapore; putu bambu of the Javanese; and the putu mayam, a local name for the idiyappam.

== Description ==
Puto is made from rice soaked overnight to allow it to ferment slightly. Yeast may sometimes be added to aid this process. It is then ground (traditionally with stone mills) into a rice dough known as galapong. The mixture is then steamed.

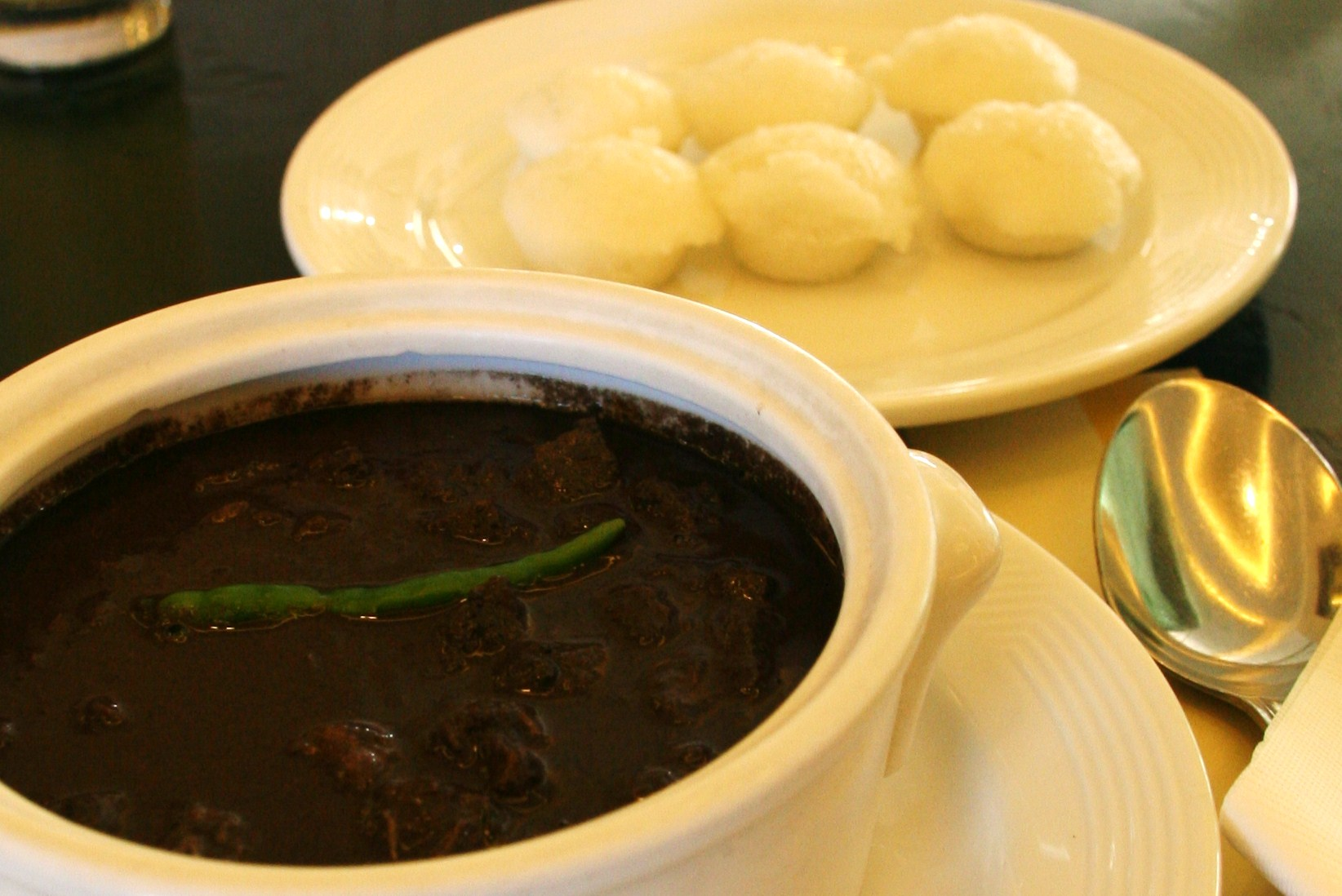
The Filipino dish dinuguan is traditionally served with puto

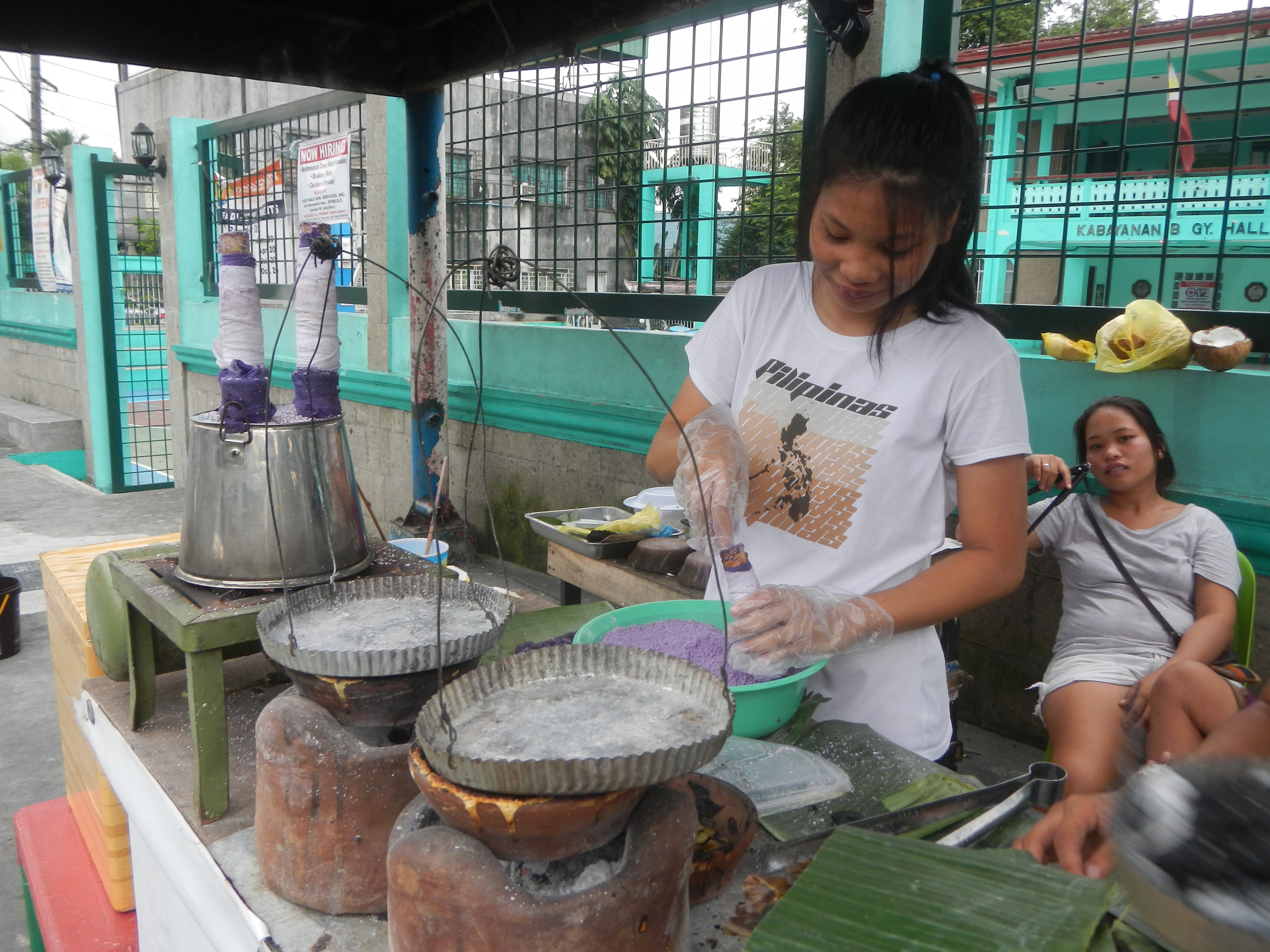
A puto stall in San Juan, Metro Manila.

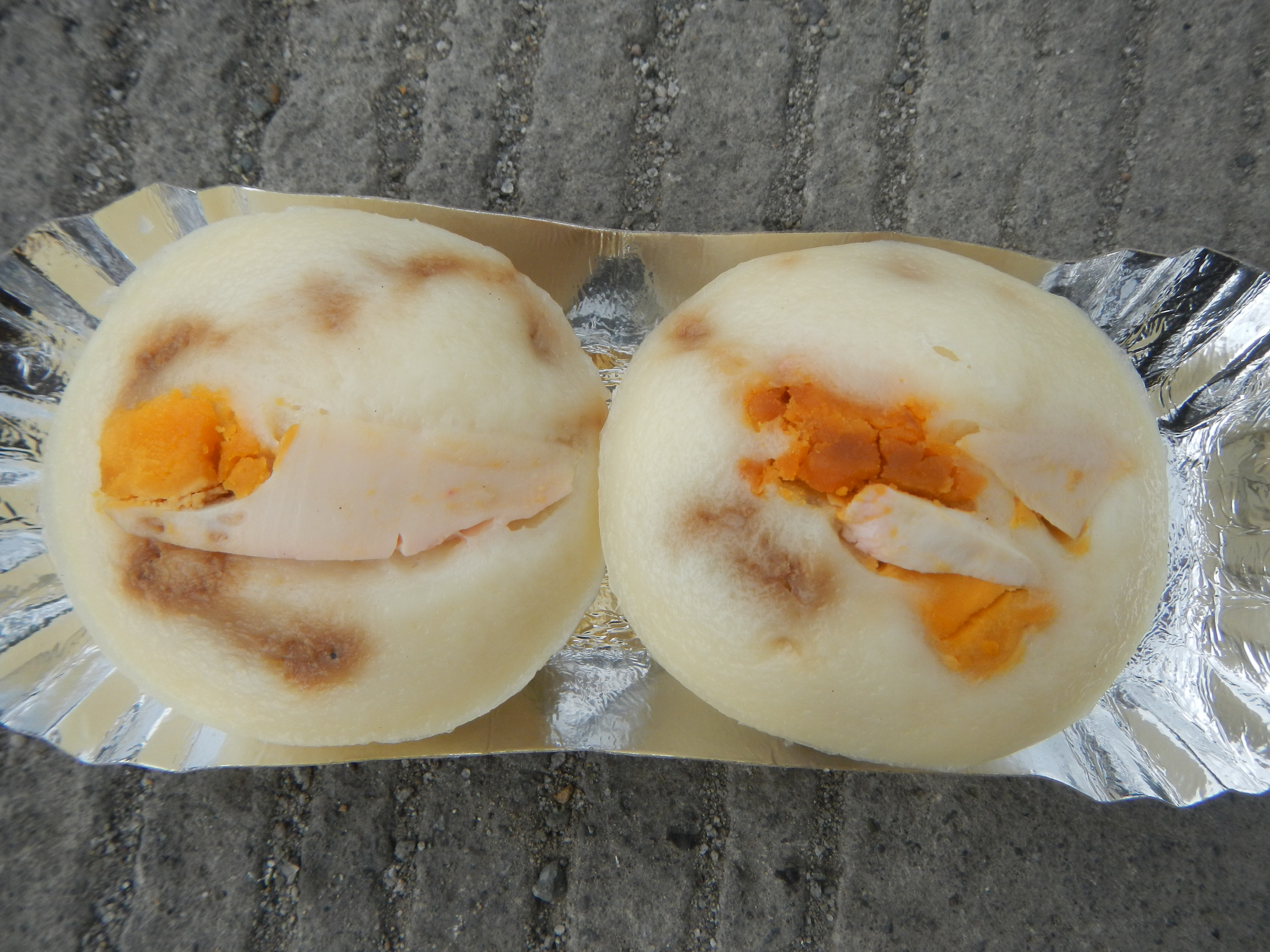
Putong lalaki topped with egg from Bulacan

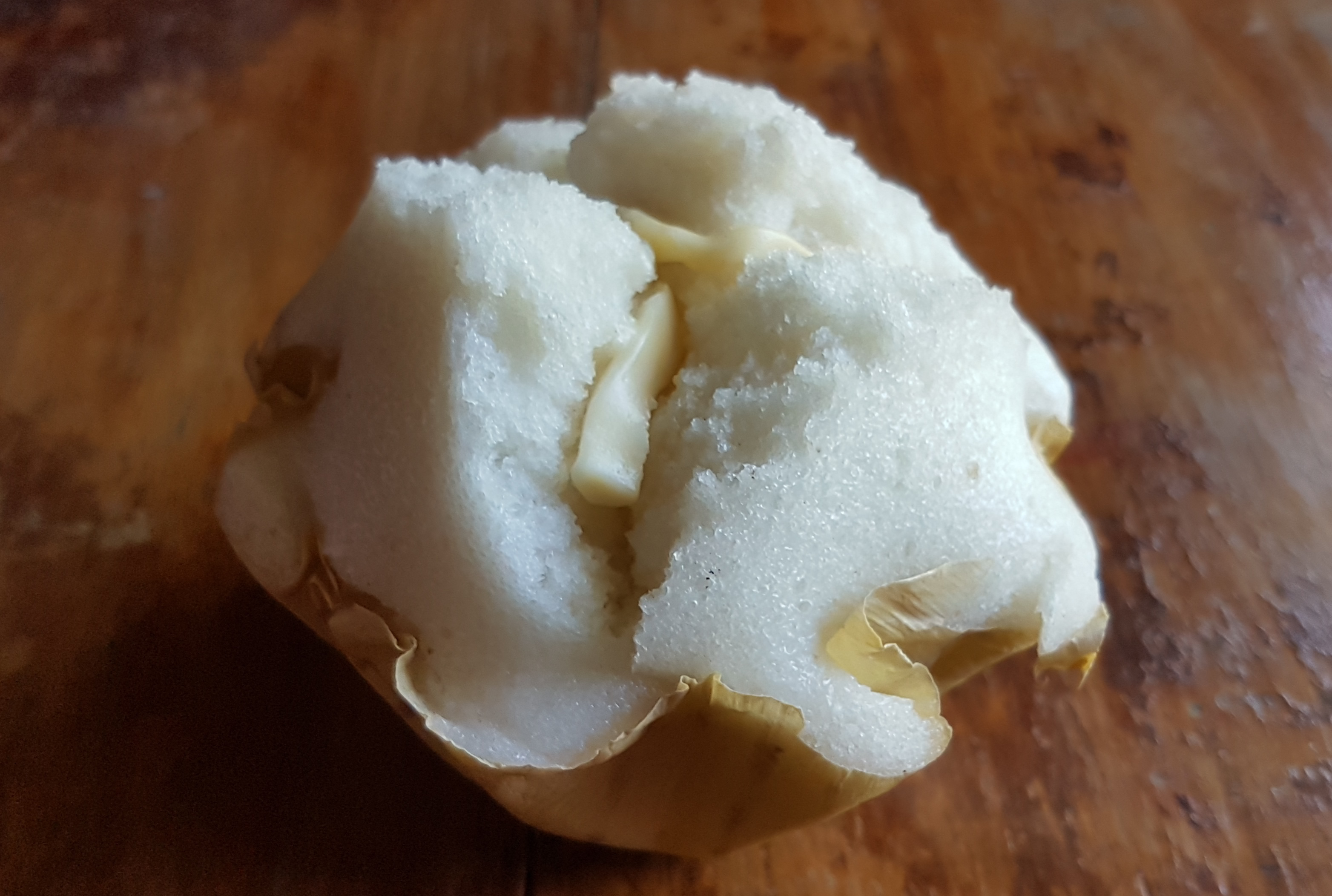
Puto with cheese toppings from Mindanao

The most common shape of the putuhán steamer used in making puto is round, ranging from 30 to 60 centimetres (12 to 24 in) in diameter and between 2 and 5 centimetres (0.79 and 1.97 in) deep. The steamers are rings made of either soldered sheet metal built around a perforated pan, or of thin strips of bent bamboo enclosing a flat basket of split bamboo slats (similar to a dim sum steamer basket). The cover is almost always conical to allow the condensing steam to drip along the perimeter instead of on the cakes.

A sheet of muslin (katsâ) is stretched over the steamer ring and the prepared rice batter poured directly on it; an alternative method uses banana leaf as a liner. The puto is then sold as large, thick cakes in flat baskets called bilao lined with banana leaf, either as whole loaves or sliced into smaller, lozenge-shaped individual portions.

Properly prepared puto imparts the slightly yeasty aroma of fermented rice galapong, which may be enhanced by the fragrance of banana leaves. It is neither sticky nor dry and crumbly, but soft, moist, and with a fine, uniform grain. The essential flavour is of freshly cooked rice, but it may be sweetened a bit if eaten by itself as a snack instead of as accompaniment to savory dishes. Most puto cooked in the Tagalog-speaking regions may contain a small quantity of wood ash lye.

Puto eaten on its own commonly add toppings like cheese, butter/margarine, hard-boiled eggs, meat, or freshly grated coconut. In Bulacan, puto with cheese toppings are humorously called putong bakla ("homosexual puto"), while puto with egg toppings are called putong lalaki ("man's puto") and those filled with meat are called putong babae ("woman's puto").

== Variants ==
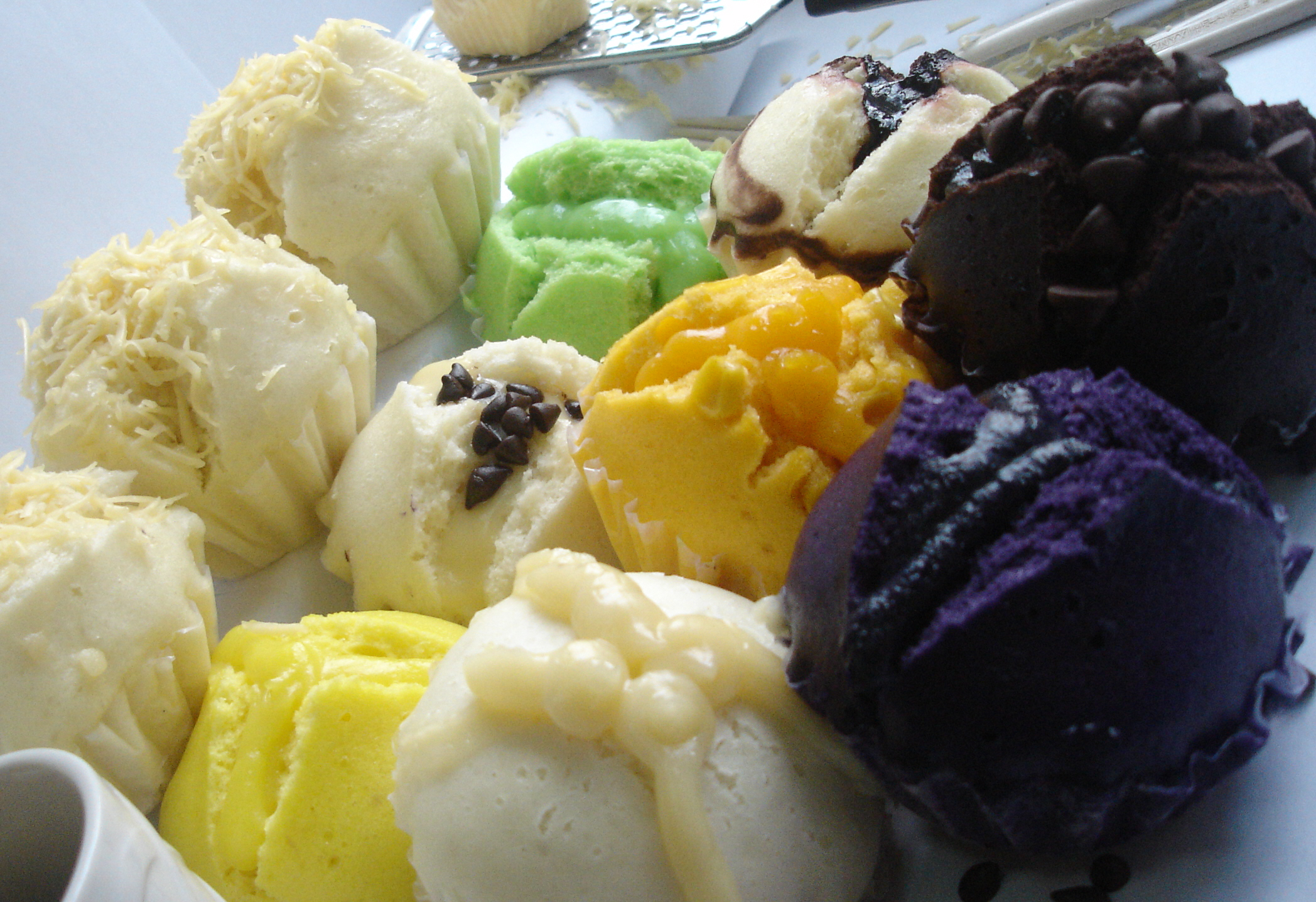
Assorted modern puto in various flavors

Puto is also an umbrella term for various kinds of indigenous steamed cakes, including those made without rice. The key characteristics are that they are cooked by steaming and are made with some type of flour (to contrast with bibingka, which are baked cakes). There are exceptions, however, like puto seko which is a baked dry cookie. The traditional puto made with galapong is sometimes referred to as putong puti ("white puto") or putong bigas ("rice puto) to distinguish it from other dishes also called puto. It is also similar to potu in Guam.

Modern variants of puto may also use non-traditional ingredients like ube (purple yam), vanilla, or chocolate. Notable variants of puto, as well as other dishes classified as puto, include the following:

=== Rice-based puto ===
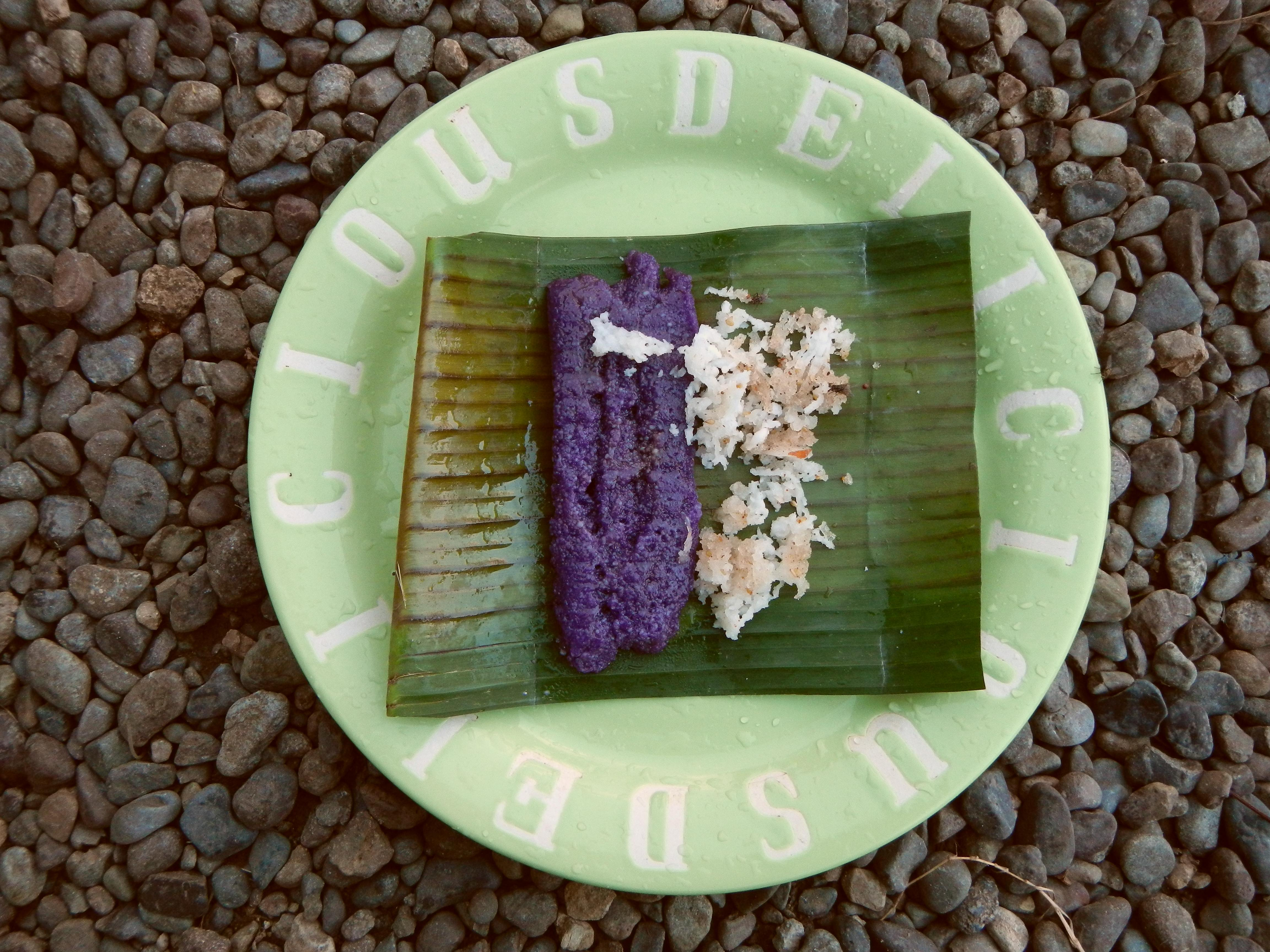
Puto bumbong, a type of puto steamed in bamboo tubes commonly sold during the Christmas season

- Puto bagas - a puto shaped like a concave disc that is made from ground rice (maaw). Unlike other puto it is baked until crunchy. It originates from the Bicol Region.
- Puto bao - a puto from the Bicol region traditionally cooked in halved coconut shells lined with a banana leaf. It distinctively has a filling of sweetened coconut meat (bukayo).
- Puto bumbong – traditionally made from a special variety of sticky or glutinous rice (called pirurutong) which has a distinctly purple colour. The rice mixture is soaked in saltwater and dried overnight and then poured into bumbóng (bamboo tube) and then steamed until steam rises out of the bamboo tubes. It is served topped with butter or margarine and shredded coconut mixed with moscovado sugar. It is commonly eaten during Christmas in the Philippines along with bibingka, another type of rice cake.
- Puto Calasiao - a puto from Calasiao, Pangasinan; that is well known all over the Philippines for its melt-in-the-mouth feeling. It is a type of puto that is shaped in small bite-sized portions.
- Puto dahon or puto dahon saging - a puto from the Hiligaynon people that is traditionally cooked wrapped in a banana leaf.
- Puto kutsinta (typically just called kutsinta or cuchinta)- a steamed rice cake similar to putong puti, but is made using lye. It is characteristically moist and chewy, and can range in color from reddish brown to yellow or orange in coloration. It is typically topped with shredded coconut meat.
- Putong lusong - an anise-flavored puto from Pampanga typically served in square or rectangular slices.
- Puto Manapla – a variant specifically flavored with anise and lined with banana leaves. It is named after the municipality of Manapla where it originates.
- Puto maya – more accurately, a type of biko. It is made from glutinous rice (usually purple glutinous rice called tapol) soaked in water, drained and then placed into a steamer for 30 minutes. This rice mixture is then combined with coconut milk, salt, sugar and ginger juice and returned to the steamer for another 25 to 30 minutes. It is popular in the Cebuano-speaking regions of the Philippines. It is traditionally served as small patties and eaten very early in the morning with sikwate (hot chocolate). It is also commonly paired with ripe sweet mangoes.
- Puto pandan – puto cooked with a knot of pandan leaves, which imparts additional fragrance and a light green color.
- Puto-Pao – a combination of siopao (meat-filled bun) and puto. It uses the traditional puto recipe but incorporates a spiced meat filling. It is similar to some traditional variants of puto (especially in Bulacan) that also have meat fillings.
- Putong pula - a Tagalog puto from the Rizal Province which uses brown muscovado sugar, giving it a brownish color.
- Putong pulo or putong polo - small spherical puto from Tagalog regions that typically use achuete seeds for coloring, giving the puto a light brown to orange color. They are traditionally served with a topping of cheese or grated young coconut.
- Putong sulot - a version of puto bumbong that uses white glutinous rice. Unlike puto bumbong it is available all-year round. It originates from the province of Pampanga and Batangas.
- Sayongsong – also known as sarungsong or alisuso, they are steamed ground mixture of glutinous rice, regular rice, and young coconut or roasted peanuts, with coconut milk, sugar, and calamansi juice. It is distinctively served in cone-shaped banana leaves. It is a specialty of Surigao del Norte and the Caraga Region, as well as the southeastern Visayas.

=== Others ===
- Puto flan (also called leche puto, or puto leche) – a combination of a steamed muffin and leche flan (custard). It uses regular flour, though there are versions that use rice flour.
- Putong kamotengkahoy - also known as puto binggala in Visayan and puto a banggala in Maranao. A small cupcake made from cassava, grated coconut, and sugar. It is very similar to cassava cake, except it is steamed rather than baked.
- Puto lanson – puto from Iloilo which is made of grated cassava, and is foamy when cooked.
- Puto mamón – a puto mixture that has no rice but combines egg yolks, salt and sugar. A mixture of milk and water and another of flour are alternately mixed into the yolks, then egg whites are beaten and folded in before the dough is poured into muffin cups and steamed for 15 to 20 minutes. It is a steamed variant of mamón, a traditional Filipino chiffon cake.
- Puto seco (also spelled puto seko) – a type of powdery cookie made from corn flour. The name literally means "dry puto" in Spanish. It is baked rather than steamed. Sometimes also called puto masa (literally "corn dough puto"; not to be confused with masa podrida, a Filipino shortbread cookie).

== Gallery ==
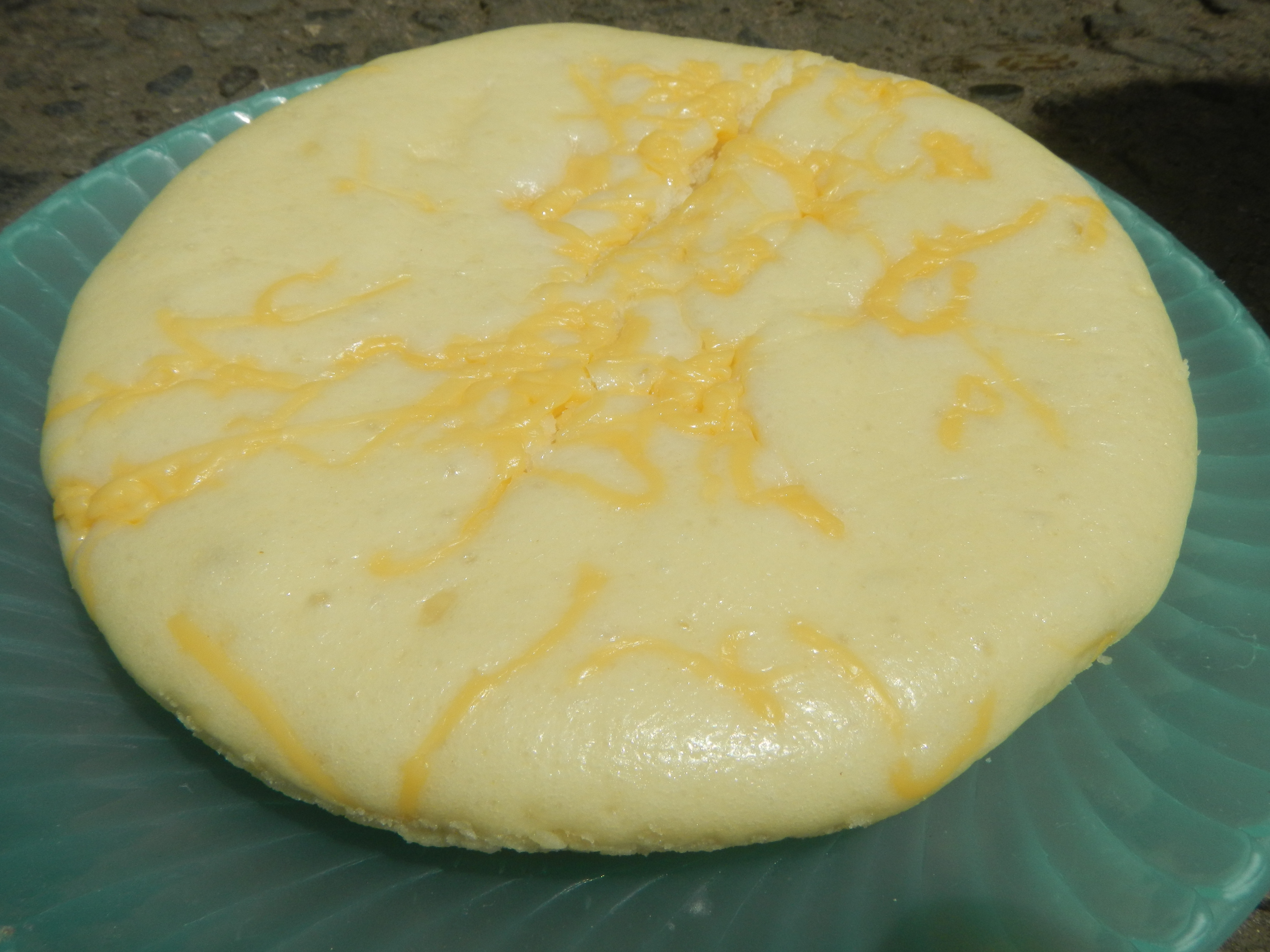
Large cheese puto from Bulacan

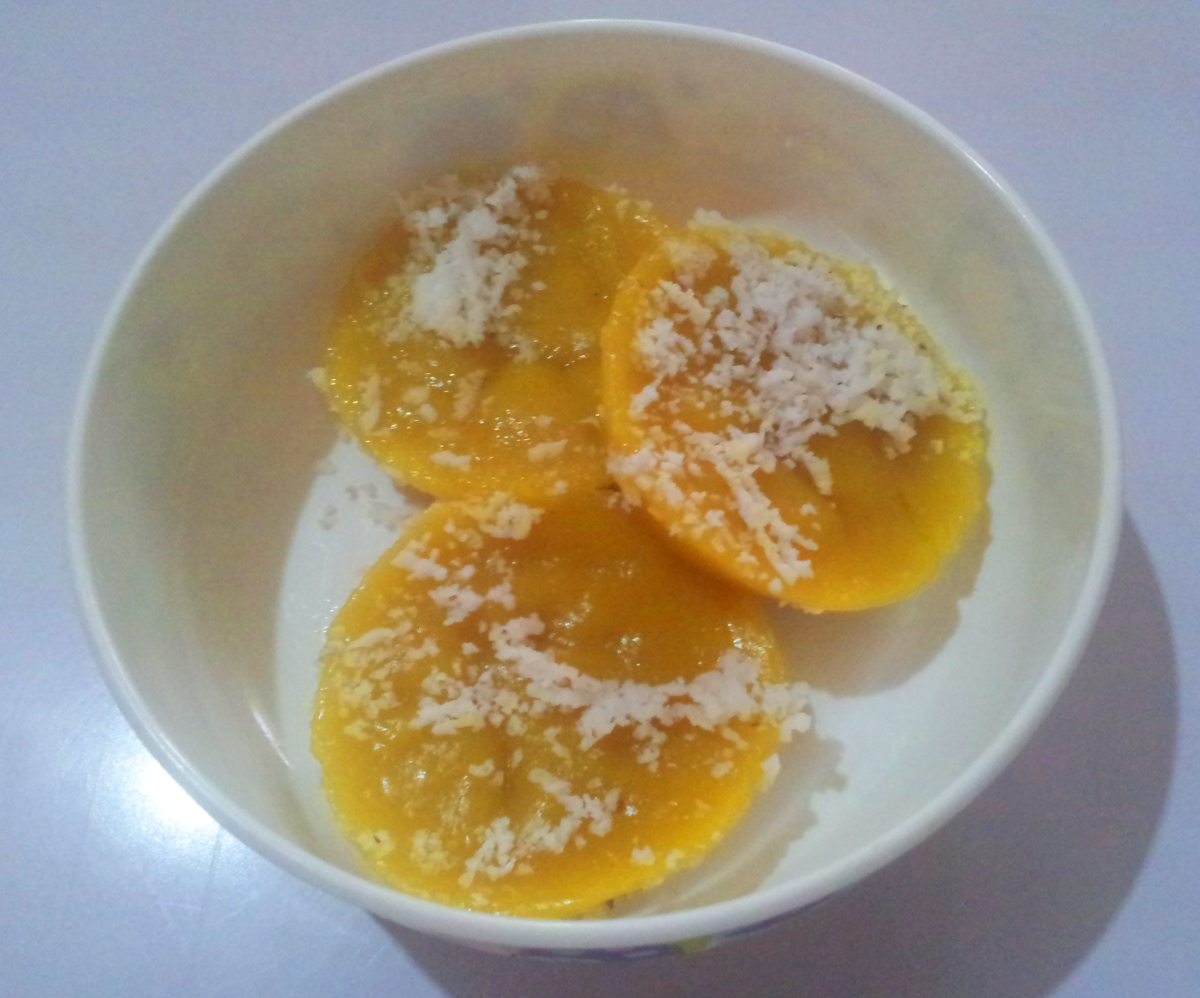
Puto kutsinta topped with grated coconut.

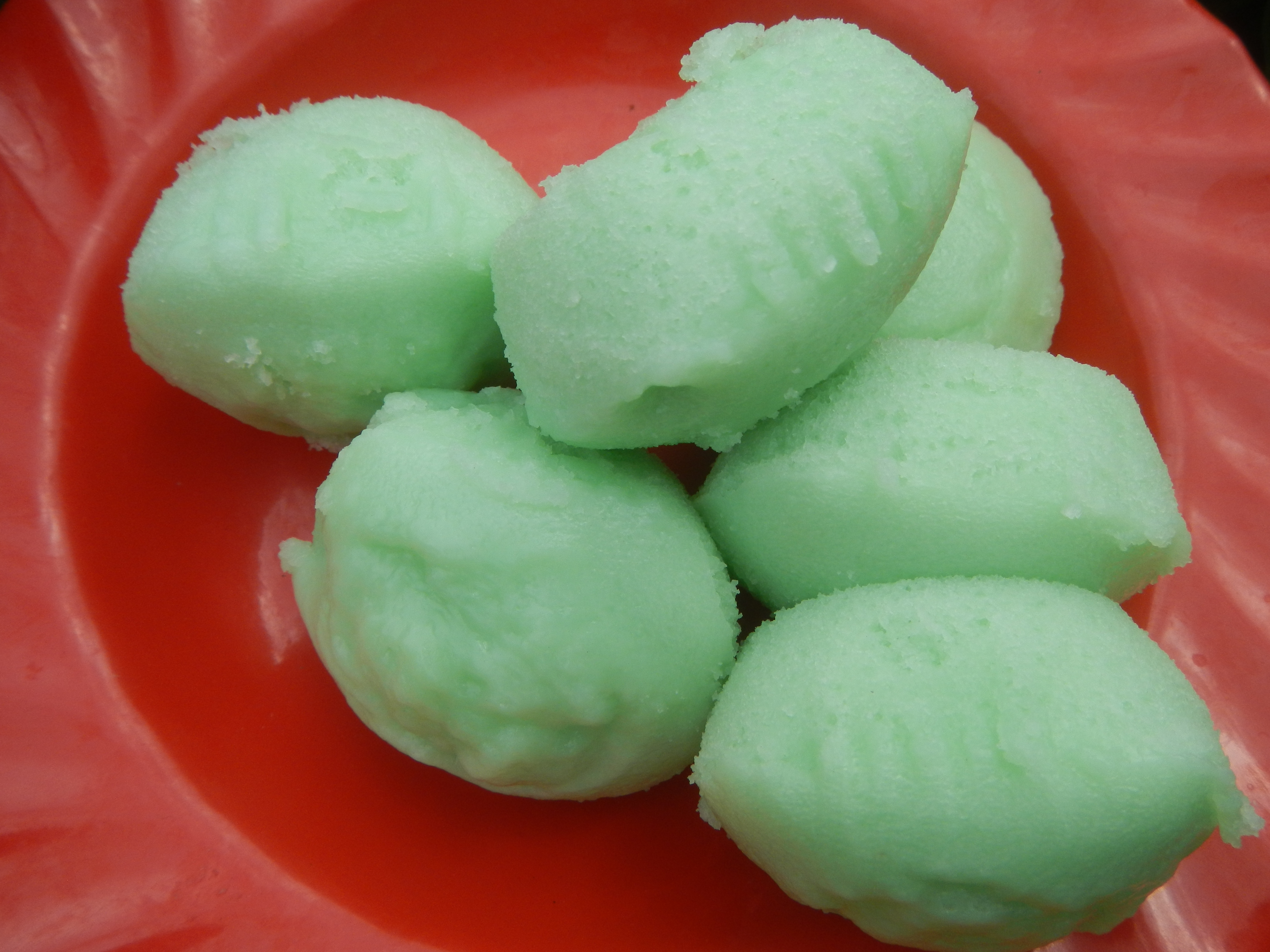
Puto pandan infused with pandan leaves

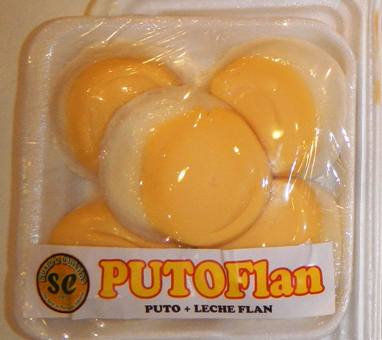
Puto flan, a combination of puto and leche flan

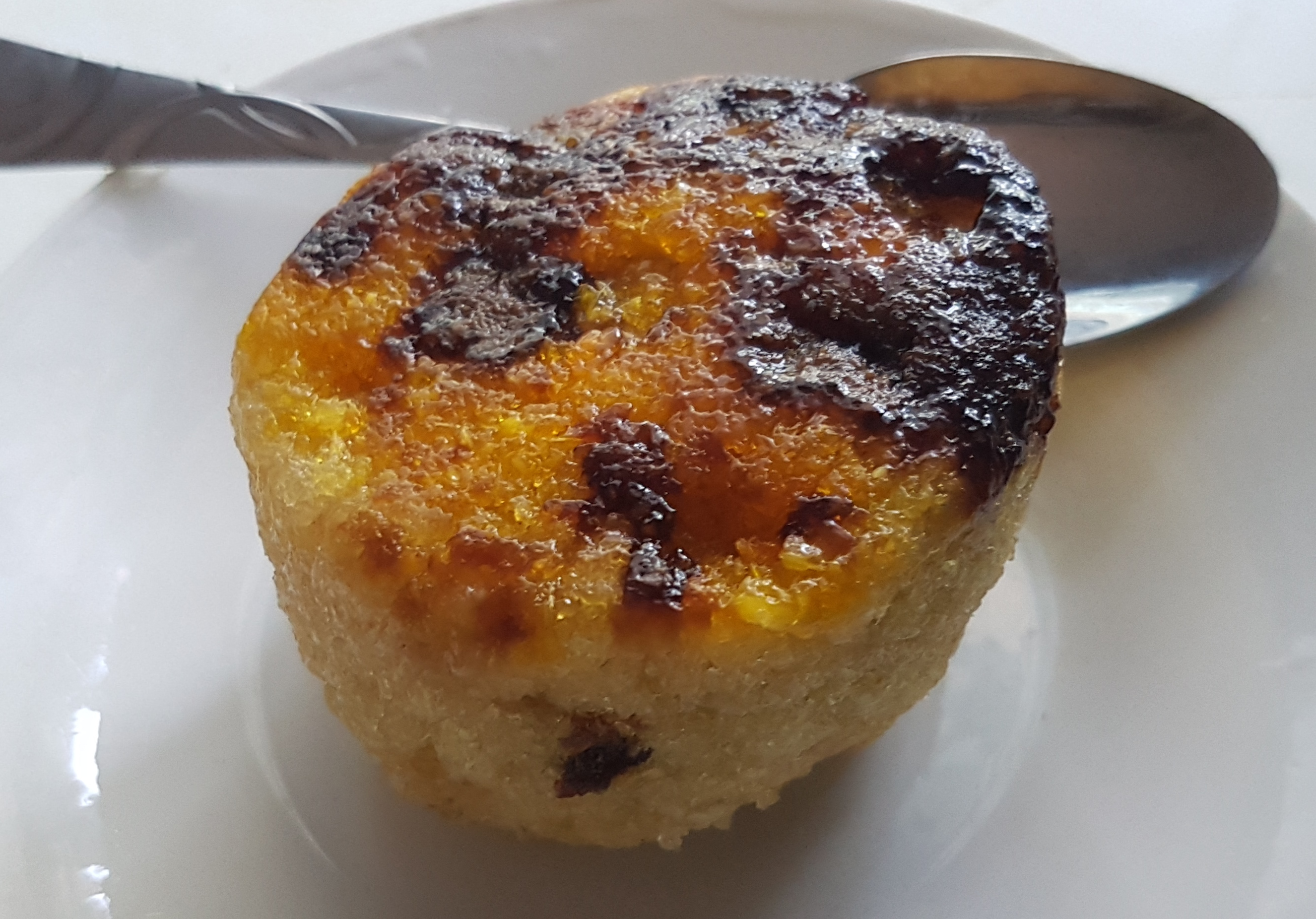
Puto lanson made from grated cassava with bukayo (sweetened coconut meat)

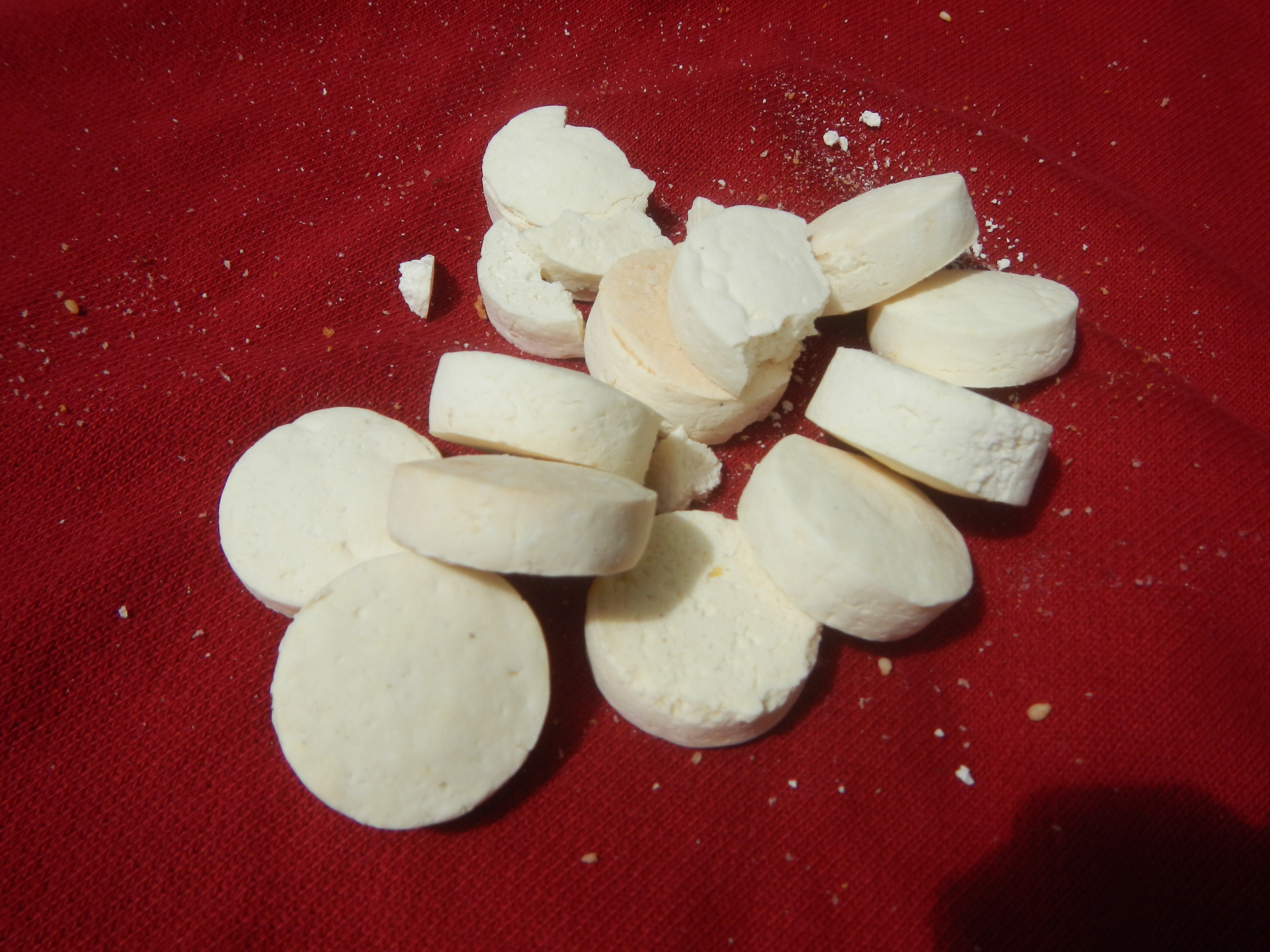
Puto seco, a dry powdery cookie made from corn flour

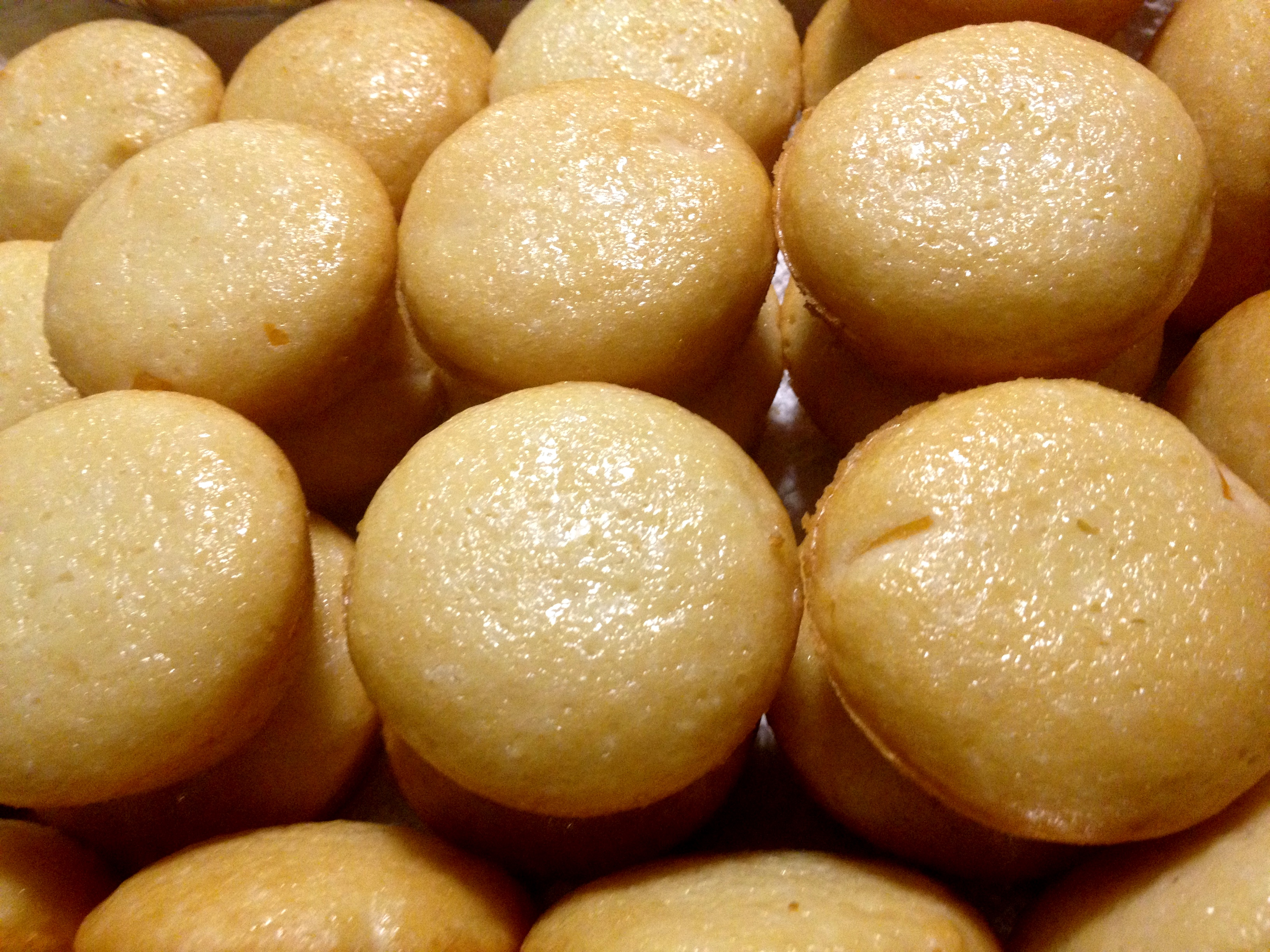
Puto mamón, made with wheat flour instead of rice flour

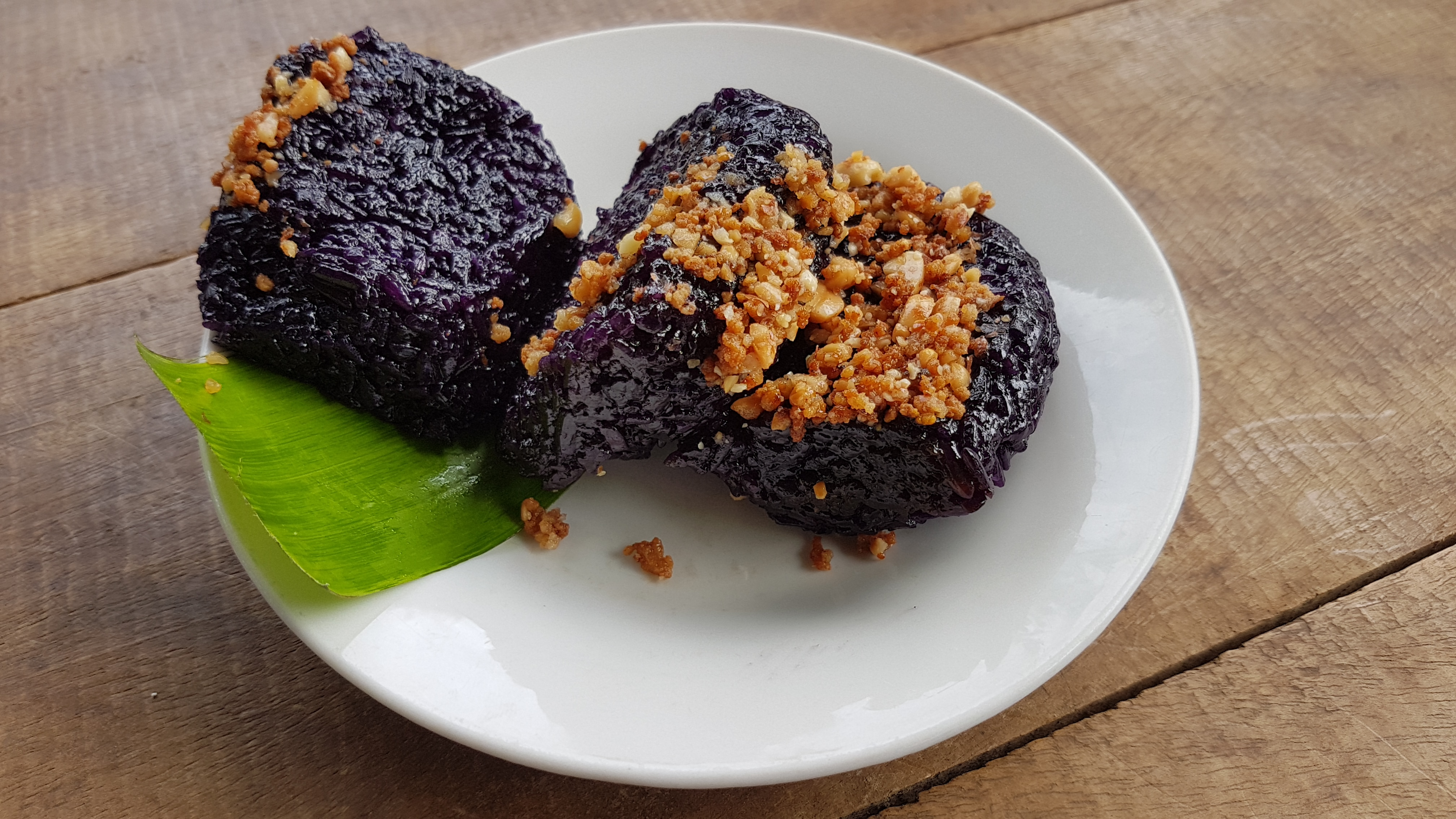
Puto maya, a type of biko shaped into little patties

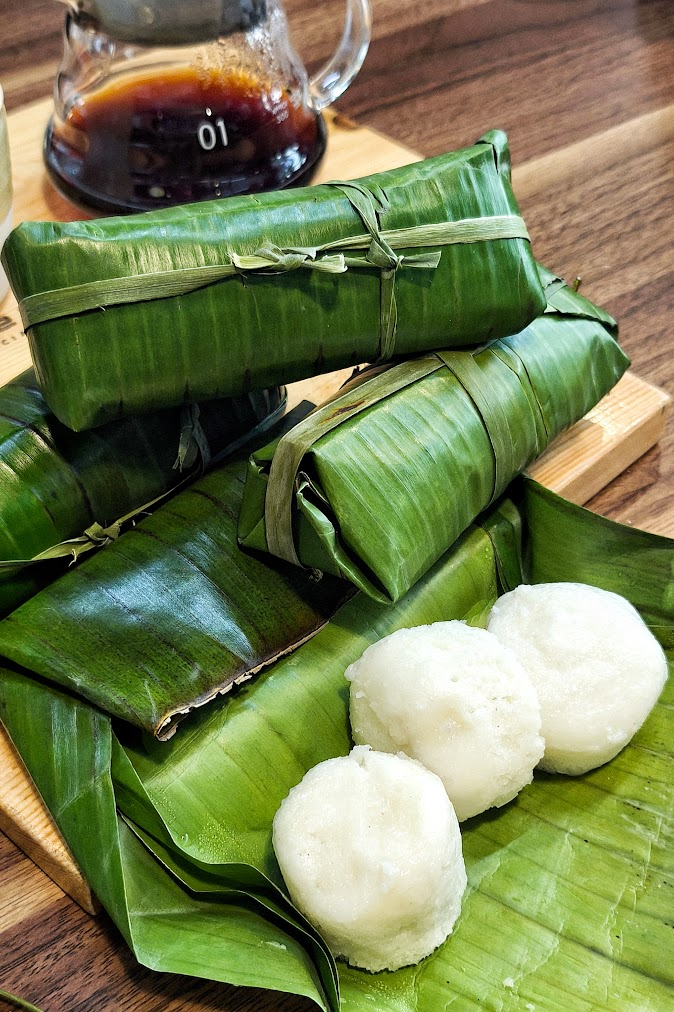
Puto Manapla from Iloilo

== See also ==
- Appam
- Bibingka
- Espasol
- Idli
- Kakanin
- Kalamay
- Kue putu
- Panyalam
- Piutu
- Puttu
- Rice cake
- Sapin-sapin
- List of steamed foods
