= Coconut rice =

Coconut-flavoured rice

Coconut rice or Roso-kokodia
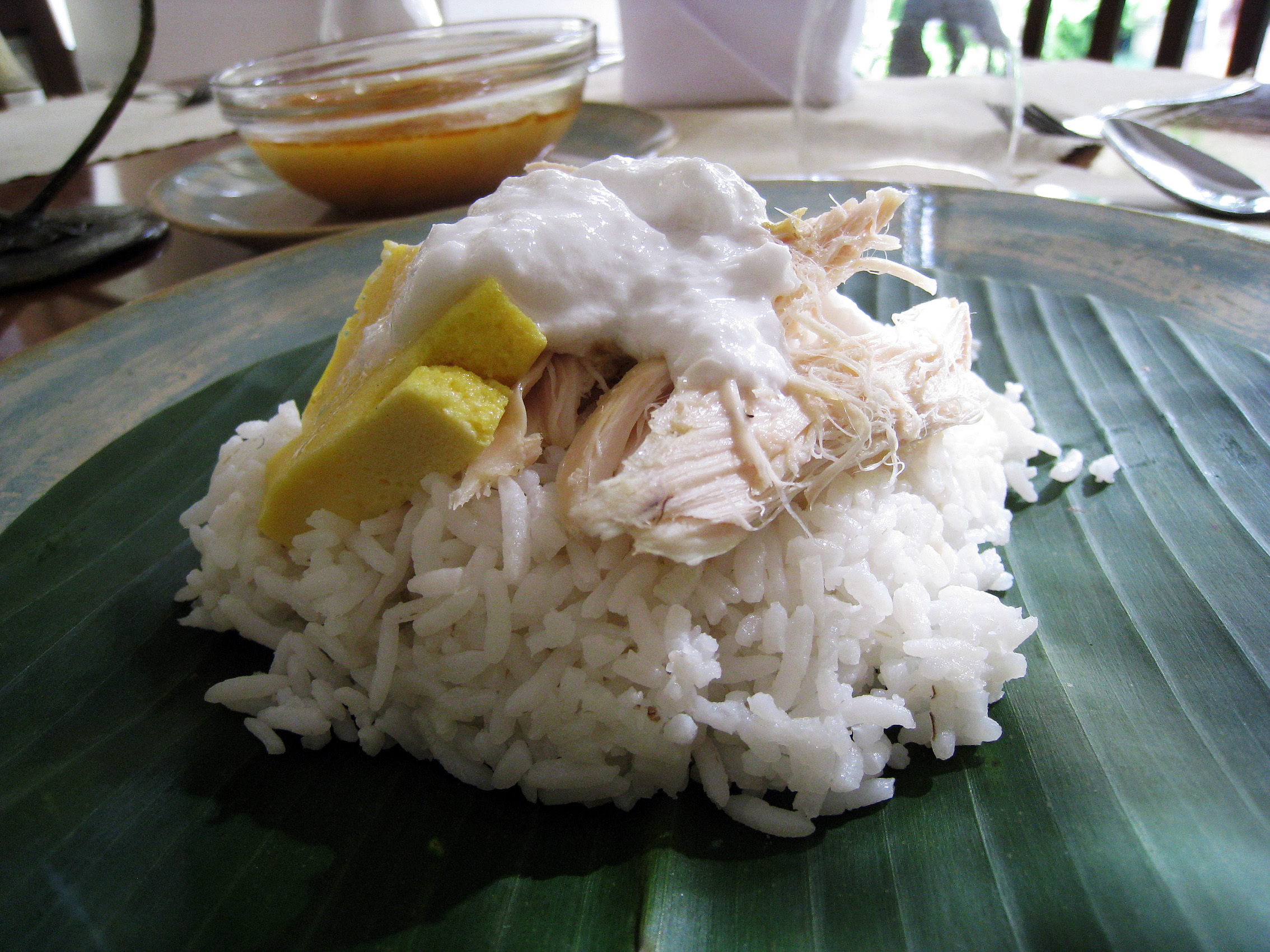
- Nasi liwet, an Indonesian-Javanese recipe of coconut rice, topped with chicken and omelette slices and thick coconut cream.
- Region or state: Southeast Asia, Indian subcontinent, East Africa, West Africa, South America, Central America, Caribbean, Oceania
- Associated cuisine: Brunei, Myanmar, Belize, Colombia, India, Indonesia, Kenya, Malaysia, Panama, Philippines, Nigeria, Sri Lanka, Thailand, Venezuela
- Main ingredients: Rice, coconut

Coconut rice is a dish prepared by cooking white rice in coconut milk or coconut flakes. As both the coconut and the rice-plant are commonly found in the tropics all around the world, coconut rice too, is found in many cultures throughout the world. It spans across the equator from Southeast Asia, the Indian subcontinent, South America, Central America, West Africa, East Africa, the Caribbean and Oceania.

== Southeast Asia ==
=== Indonesia ===
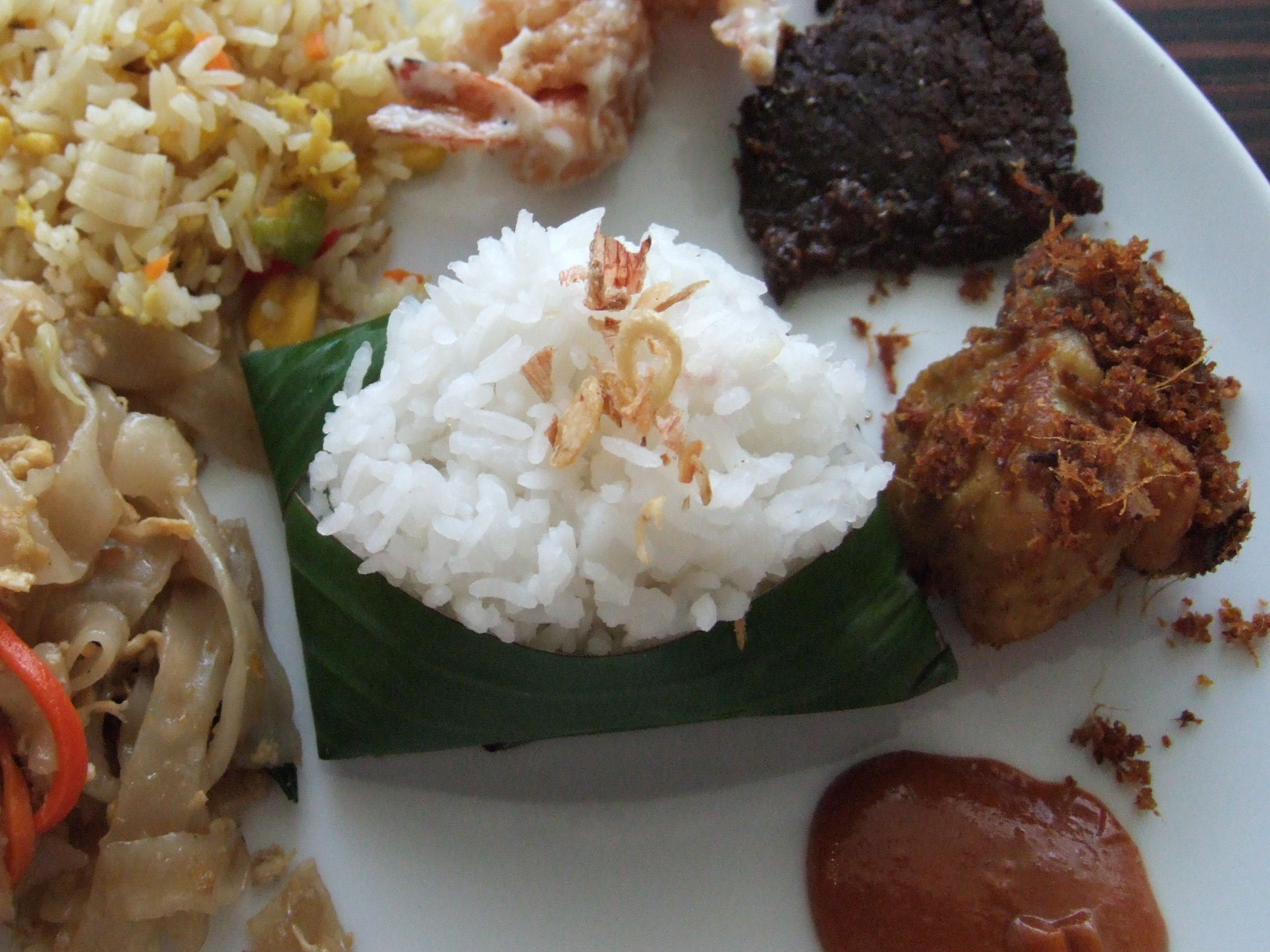
Nasi uduk, Jakartan coconut rice

Rice cooked in coconut milk is common in Indonesian cuisine, with each region having developed their own version of it. Plain coconut rice is usually made from white rice, coconut milk, ginger, fenugreek seed, lemongrass and pandan leaves, with the most common coconut rice recipe in Indonesia being nasi uduk from Jakarta. Other coconut milk rice recipes include nasi gurih from Aceh and Javanese nasi liwet. Nasi kuning is Indonesian yellow rice which is similar to coconut rice with addition of turmeric as a coloring and flavoring agent. Other types of coconut rice recipes take the form of dumplings, such as burasa from Makassar and lemang popular in Minangkabau.

=== Malaysia ===
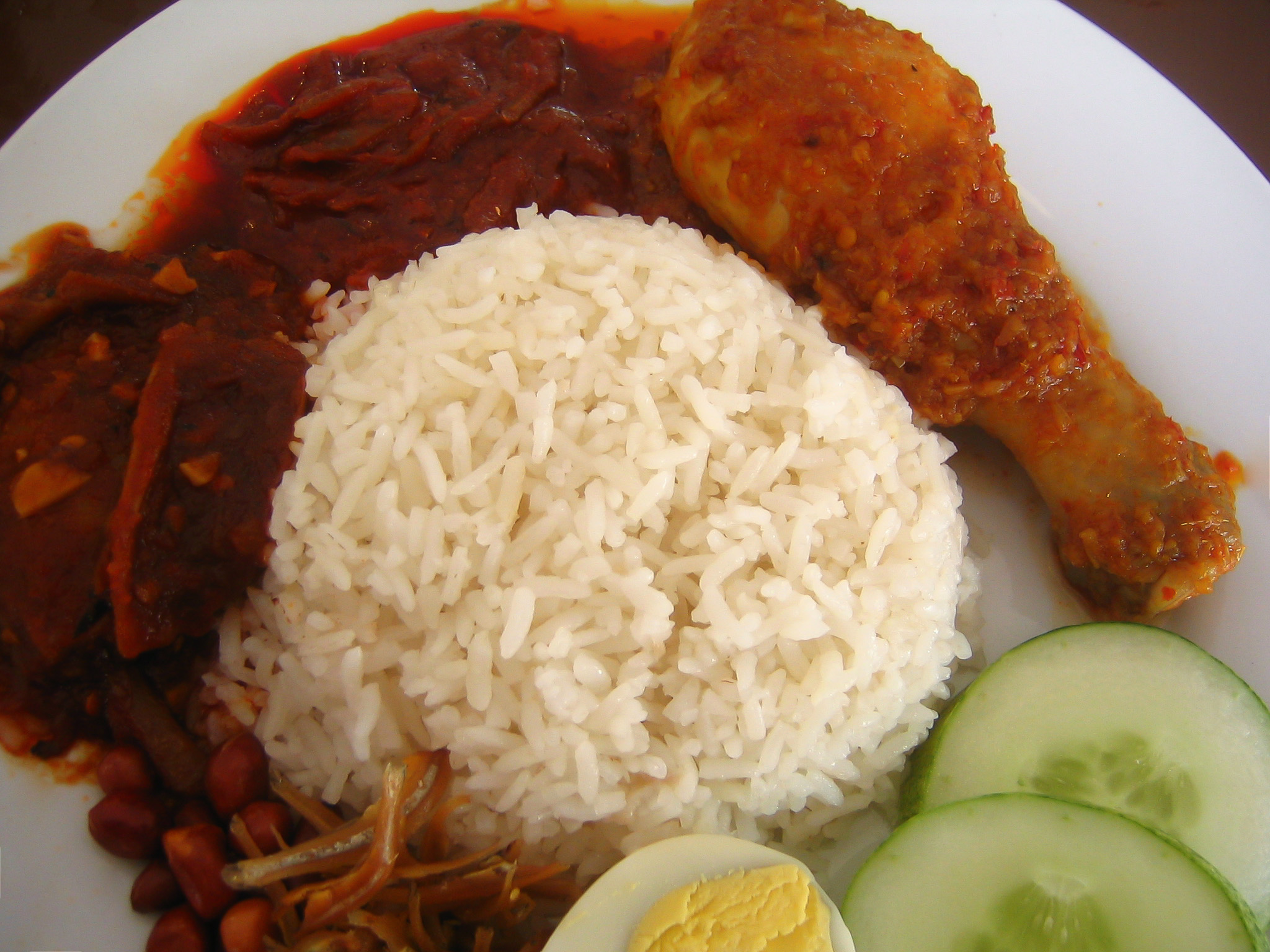
Nasi lemak, the national dish of Malaysia

Nasi lemak (coconut milk and pandan leaf) is the most popular coconut rice recipe in Malaysia. It is considered a national dish of Malaysia.

=== Myanmar ===
In Burmese cuisine, ohn htamin (အုန်းထမင်း), as rice cooked with coconut milk is called, is a ceremonial staple food, often eaten in lieu of plain white rice. In the most basic version of ohn htamin, rice is cooked with a base of coconut milk, along with fried shallots and salt, adding to the rice's savory and rich flavours. Ohn htamin is commonly paired with Burmese sibyan curries.

=== Philippines ===
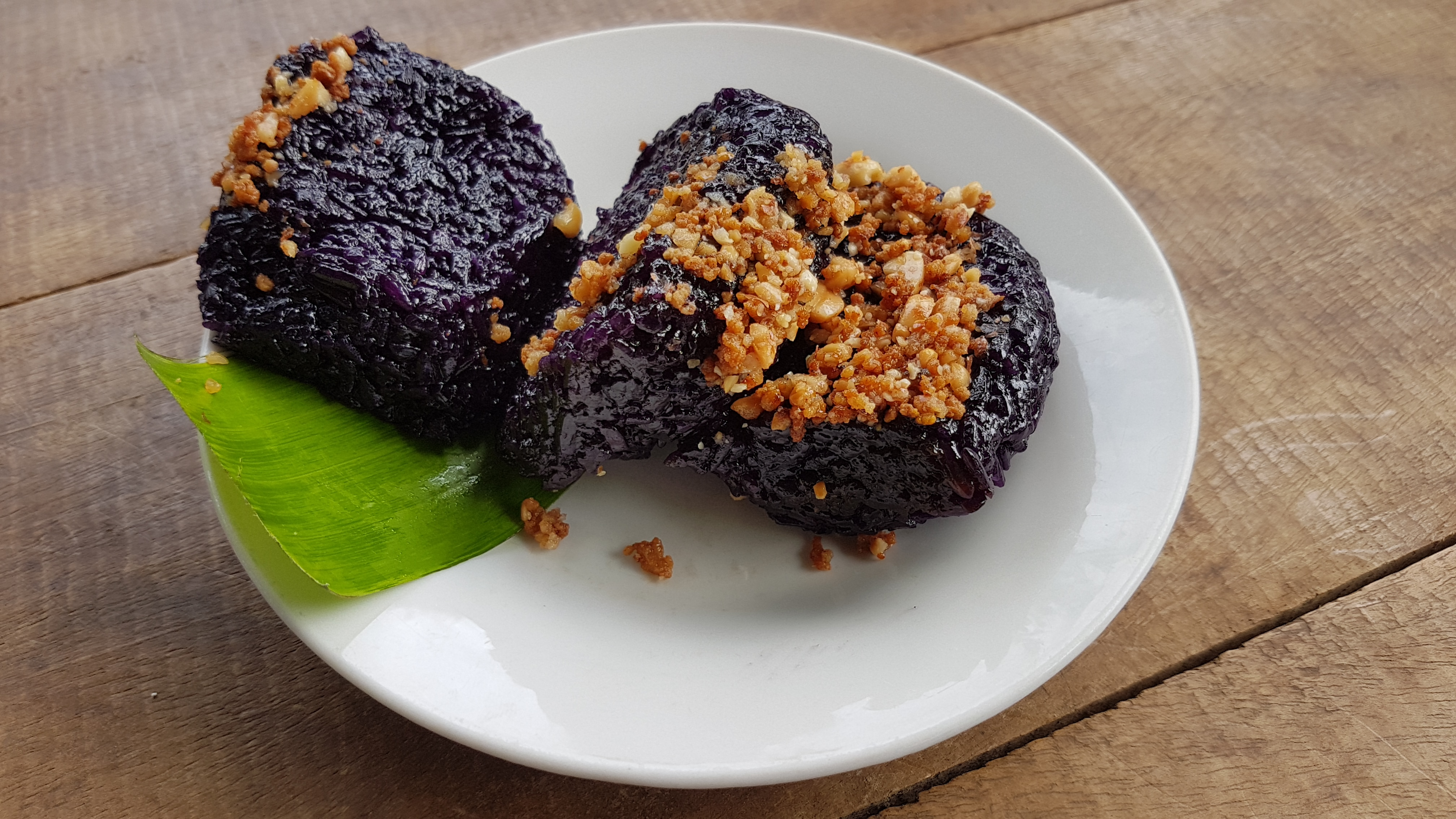
Puto maya from the Philippines

Most dishes of whole rice grains in coconut milk in the Philippines are desserts that belong to the general category of rice cake snacks, the kakanin (lit. "prepared rice"). The most basic type is the biko, which is made from rice, coconut milk, and muscovado sugar. Other similar dishes include puto maya, suman, binutong, sayongsong, and the patupat; all of which are distinctively wrapped in leaves in various ways. There are also several traditional sweet rice porridge dishes that use glutinous rice in coconut milk, including binignit, ginataang munggo, and ginataang mais.

Savory preparations of rice in coconut milk include bringhe (also biringi or biringye), a mixed rice dish that uses glutinous rice cooked in coconut milk as the base; junay, which uses coconut milk in addition to burnt coconut meat; pater which adds spicy toasted grated coconut (palapa); and oko-oko which uniquely cooks rice in coconut milk, spices, and pandan leaves inside a sea urchin shell.

=== Thailand ===
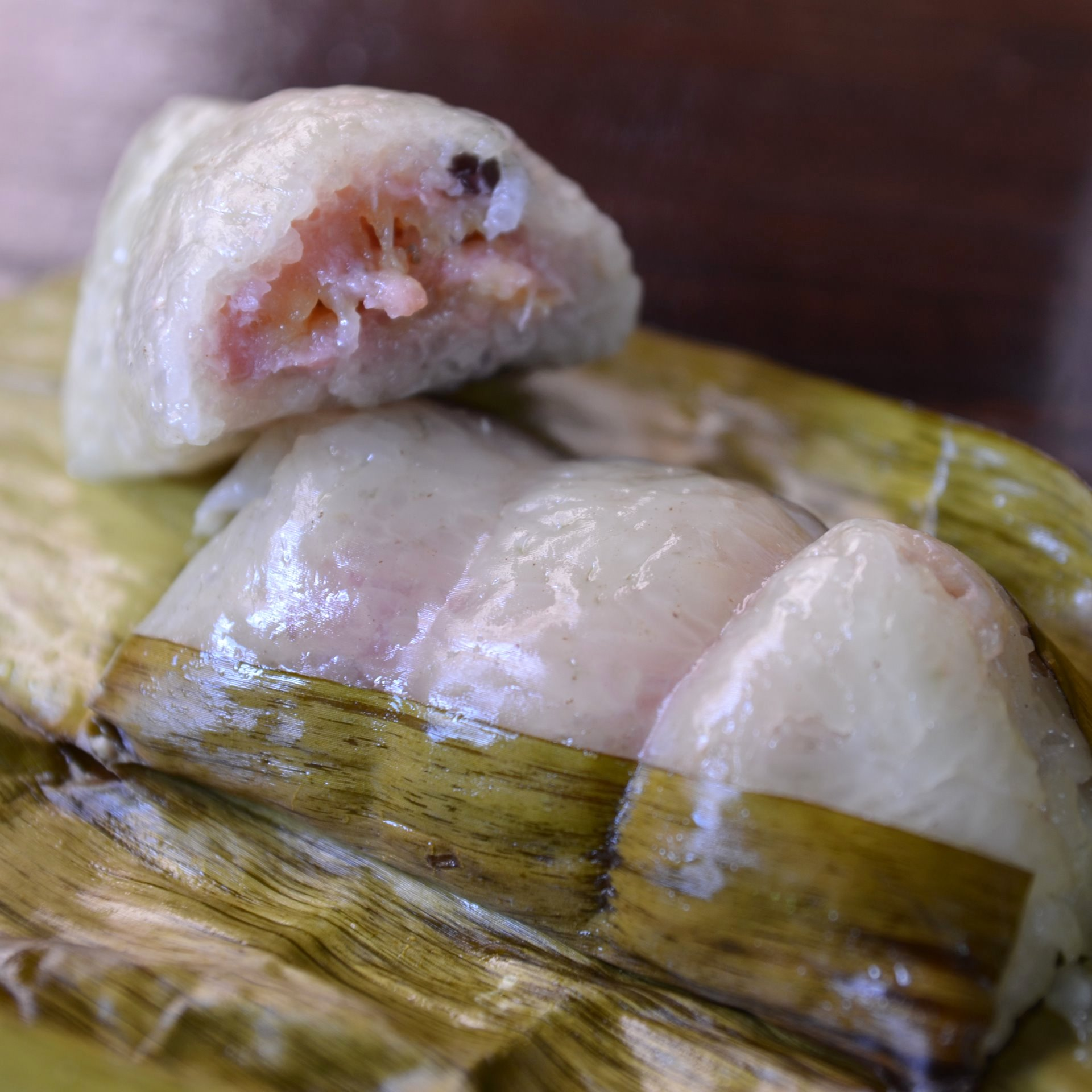
Thai khao tom mat

In Thai cuisine, sweet coconut sticky rice is very popular as a dessert or sweet snack. It is made with glutinous rice, coconut milk, sugar, salt and water and most famously paired with slices of ripe mango and an additional dollop of coconut cream. Outside of the mango season, it will also be eaten with other fruits or semi-sweet dishes. Other popular coconut rice desserts are khao tom mat, where sweet banana is steamed inside sticky rice while wrapped in a banana leaf, khao lam, where the rice and coconut milk mixture is steamed inside a section of bamboo, and khao niao kaeo, a very sweet dessert of glutinous rice, coconut milk, and large amounts of sugar, and most often pink or green in color.

== Indian subcontinent ==
=== India ===
In India, coconut rice (కొబ్బరి అన్నం Telugu, ಕಾಯಿ ಅನ್ನ in Kannada, தேங்காய் சாதம் in Tamil.) famous in the southern regions. In India, coconut rice usually made from basmati rice with mild coconut flavours acquired from coconut milk, and commonly served with curries. It is made with coconut flakes (or grated or desiccated/dry coconut). One way to make this dish is to make the rice separately (preferably using a rice variety which is light and fluffy when cooked) and then mixing it with the coconut mixture (coconut flakes toasted in sesame/coconut oil and spiced with paprika, nuts, curry powder/leaves, and other spices).

=== Sri Lanka ===
In Sri Lanka, coconut rice is often referred to as "milk rice" or kiribath. It is widely served across the nation on special occasions. It is accompanied by lunu miris, a spicy onion sambol ground with red chilli, onions, tomato, lime and salt with umbalakada.

== America ==
=== Colombia and Panama ===
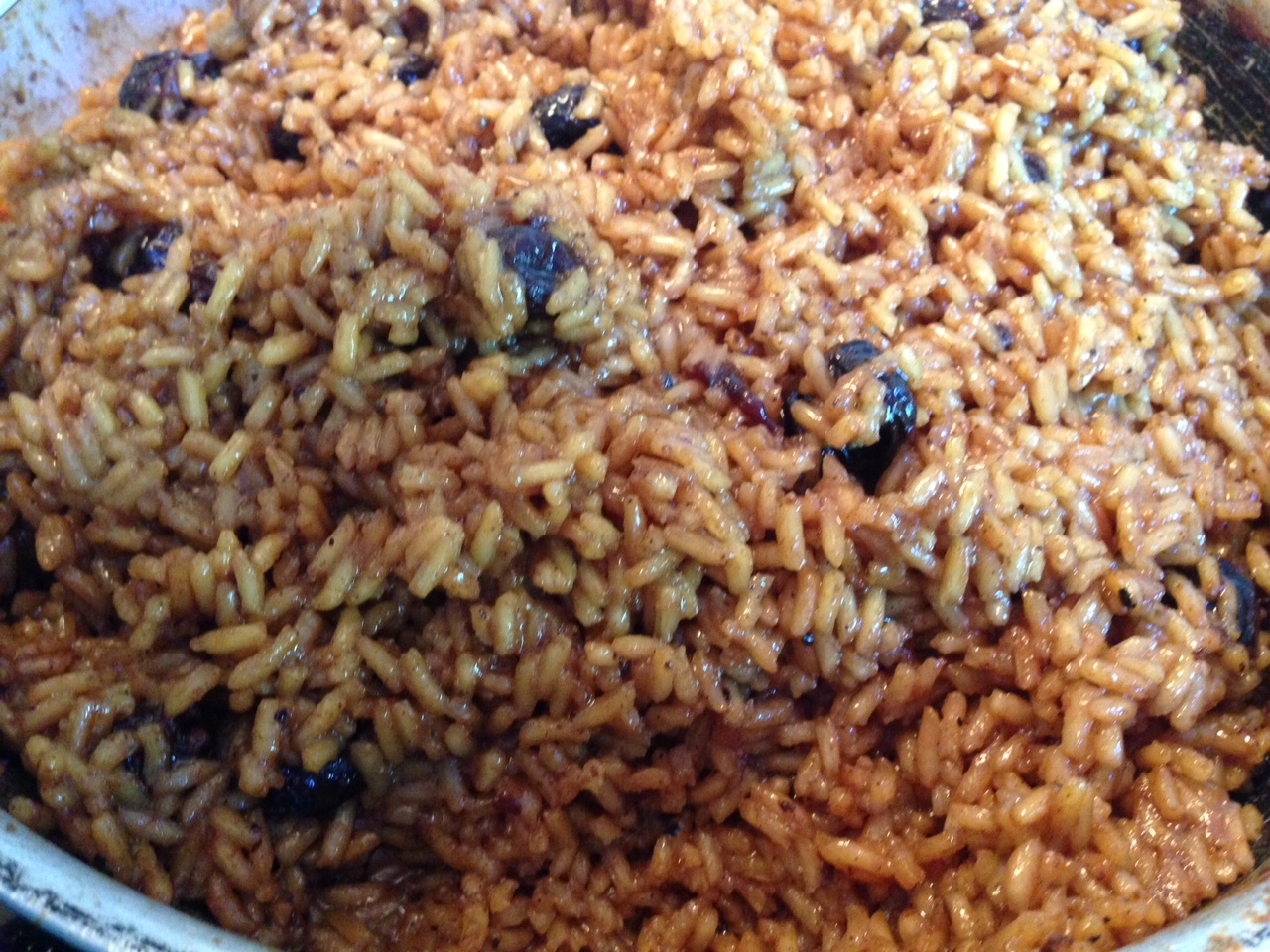
Colombian aroz con coco

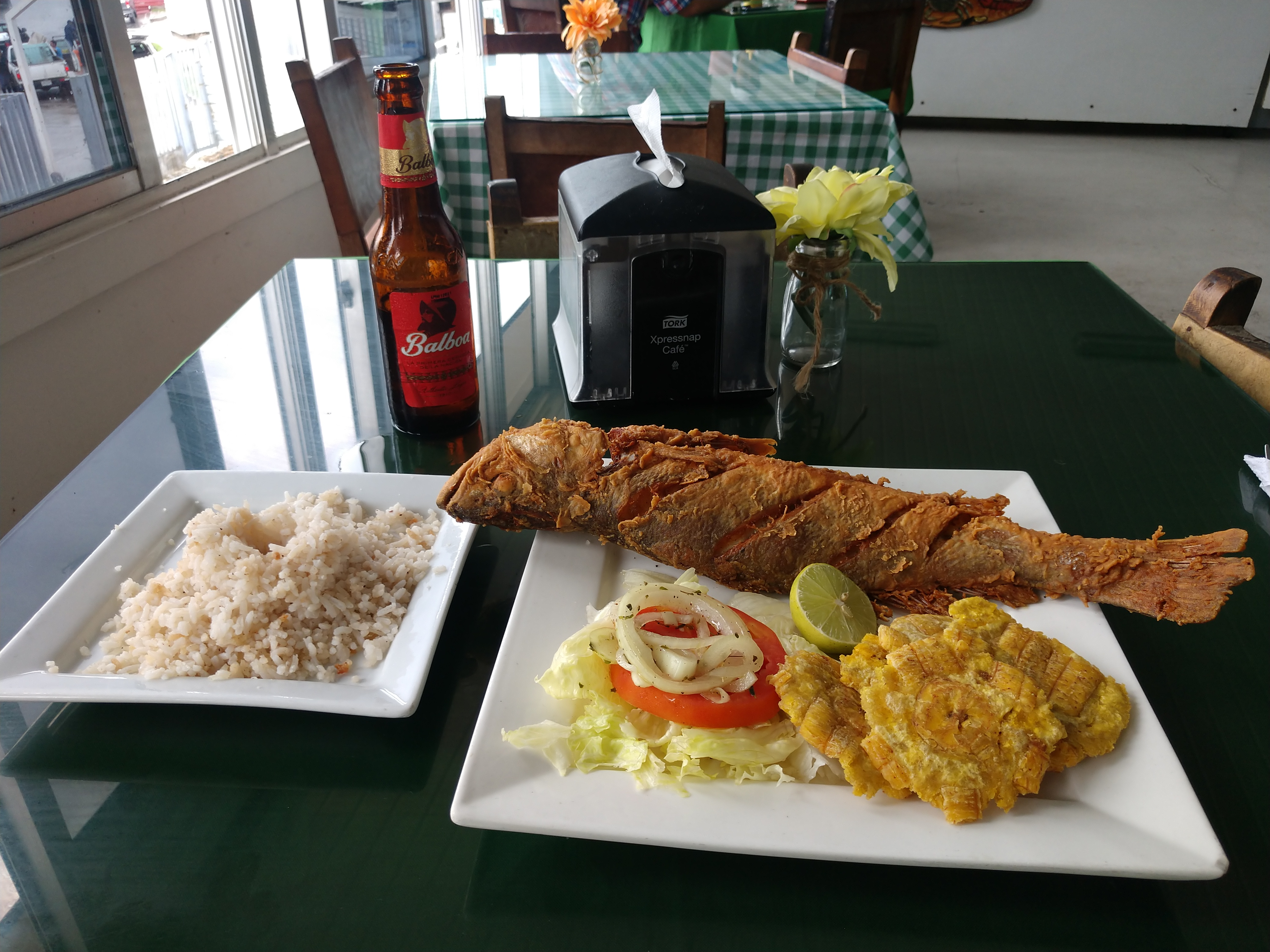
Panamanian arroz con coco

On the Caribbean coast of Colombia and Panama, arroz con coco is a typical side dish for fish. It is made with white rice cooked in a base of coconut milk and combined with shredded coconut meat, water, salt, raisins (optional), and sugar.

=== Honduras ===
In the Caribbean coast of Honduras, rice is traditionally cooked with coconut oil, coconut milk, garlic, onions and red or black beans, a hearty dish known as "rice and beans". This plate is especially popular among Hondurans of African ancestry (Garifuna), but like many other Garifuna plates and foods with African influence, it is popular among all Hondurans and regarded as a typical Honduran food by Hondurans of all racial backgrounds.

=== Puerto Rico ===
In Puerto Rico coconut rice is usually served with fish and sweet plantains. The rice is sautéed with coconut oil and salt, shredded coconut and coconut milk are then added with the option of garlic, onions, cilantro, raisins, and kumquats. The rice is then covered with a banana leaf during the cooking process. Another popular coconut rice dish is arroz con dulce (coconut rice pudding) a dessert made with milk, coconut milk, coconut cream, raisins, vanilla, rum, sugar, ginger, and spice. Puerto Rican rice pudding is popular in Colombia, Cuba, and Venezuela.

== Oceania ==
=== Samoa ===
In Samoa, coconut rice is known as Alaisa fa'apopo and is made by cooking white rice in coconut milk. A variation of coconut rice known as Koko alaisa is made with the addition of cocoa and orange leaves, often eaten as a snack or dessert. Coconut rice is typically eaten on its own or as an accompaniment to dishes such as Moa fa'asaina.

== See also ==
- Rice and peas
- Yellow rice
- Biryani
