= Junay (food) =

Filipino cuisine

- Alternative names: Junai
- Course: Main dish
- Place of origin: Philippines
- Region or state: Sulu
- Main ingredients: white rice, coconut milk, pamapa (powdered mixed spices), powdered burnt coconut meat
- Similar dishes: pastil, binalot, piyoso

Junay or junai is a Filipino packed rice dish wrapped in banana leaves, made with burnt coconut meat and various spices. It originates from the Tausug people of the Sulu Archipelago. It is made by boiling rice in coconut milk until half-cooked. It is then wrapped in banana leaves with pamapa (powdered mixed spices), oil, salt, and siyunog lahing (powdered burnt coconut meat). It is further steamed in water until fully cooked. The spices and burnt coconut are also sold pre-mixed and are known as pipis itum.

== See also ==
- Putli mandi
- Pastil
- Tiyula itum
- Tamu
- Suman
