= Piutu =

Filipino dish with mashed cassava

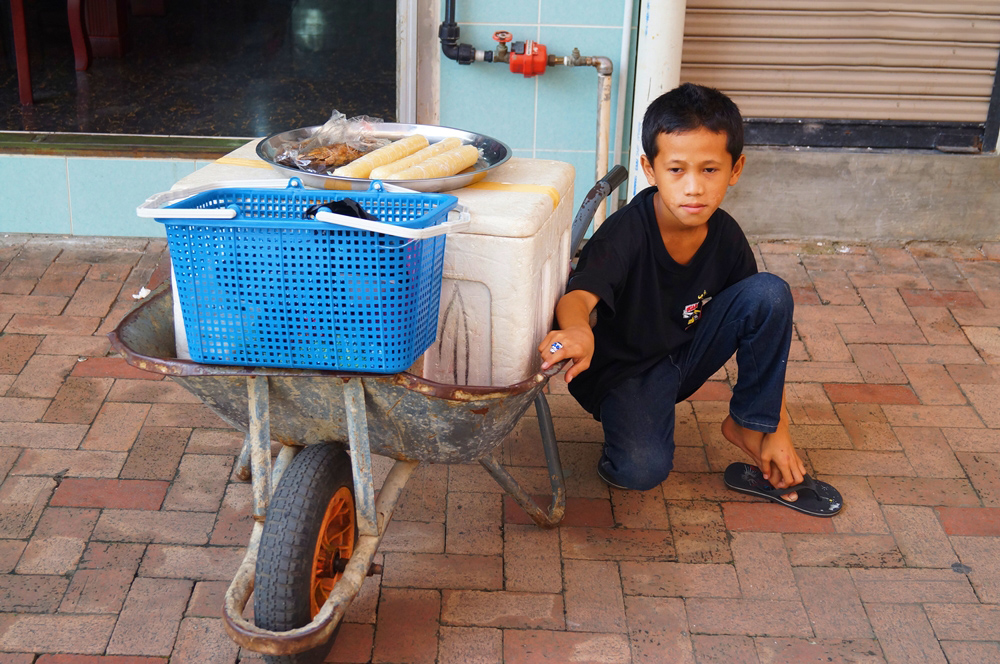
- A Tausug child vendor selling piutu in Sabah
- Alternative names: piyutu, putu
- Course: Staple
- Place of origin: Philippines
- Region or state: Sulu, Basilan, Tawi-Tawi, Zamboanga Peninsula, Sabah, and diaspora communities
- Created by: Tausūg people
- Main ingredients: Cassava
- Similar dishes: suman, puto

Piutu, also known as piyutu, pinutu, or putu, is a traditional Filipino dish of the Tausug people and Sama people of the Philippines and the east coast of Sabah. It is made from steamed cassava (panggi) that is mashed and shaped into cylinders or disks. They were traditionally wrapped in banana or palm leaves, but are commonly sold wrapped in clear plastic today. It is typically torn or cut into small disks for eating. It is not flavored and thus need to be eaten with another accompanying dish, usually seafood. The most popular accompaniments include Agal-agal (seaweed salads including lato "sea grapes"), kima (giant clam), kinilau, piyalam, and siyagul (a stew made from shark meat with siyunug lahing "burnt coconut", curry, or dulau "turmeric"). It serves as a replacement for rice, after the introduction of cassava to the Philippines from South America by the Spanish during the colonial period.

Similar and related staple dishes are biamban and sianglag. Biamban (or bamban) is made from steamed tapioca flour cylinders wrapped in banana or palm leaves. Sianglag (also known as tompe, tompek, tinompeh, or anggang) is made from grated cassava that is fried until yellowish. Both also replace rice as an accompaniment to savory dishes.

== See also ==
- Pusô
- Puto
- Lontong
- Kakanin
- Oko-oko
