= Sayongsong =

Rice cake in Filipino cuisine

- Alternative names: sayungsong, sayungsung, sarongsong, sarungsung, sarungsong, alisuso, balisungsong, balisunsong, balisuso
- Course: Dessert, Main Course
- Place of origin: Philippines
- Region or state: Surigao del Norte, Caraga Region, Eastern Visayas, Central Visayas, Bicol Region, Tagalog Region
- Serving temperature: warm, room temperature
- Main ingredients: Glutinous rice, rice, sugar, coconut milk, roasted peanuts, calamansi juice
- Similar dishes: suman, puto, pusô

Sayongsong is a traditional Filipino steamed sweet rice cake distinctively served in cone-shaped banana leaves. It exists in Surigao del Norte and other areas of the Caraga Region of northeastern Mindanao, as well as in Bohol and the Eastern Visayas (where it is known as sarungsong or alisuso) and the Bicol Region (where it is known as balisungsong). In the Tagalog region, a similar cone-shaped rice cake is also called balisungsong, but unlike the sayongsong it is not sweetened and is eaten with savory dishes.

== Etymology ==
The name means "cone", or more accurately "shaped like a snail".

== Description ==
Sayongsong is regarded as a type of puto or suman depending on how the contents are cooked.

Sayongsong is can be time-consuming to make. It is made with equal parts of glutinous rice and regular rice. It traditionally uses pirurotong, a native deep purple glutinous rice, which gives it a striking blue to purple color, but other types of glutinous rice can also be used. The rice mixture is soaked for around 20 minutes. Roasted peanuts (Surigao version) or grated young coconut (Visayas version) are then added and the whole mixture is ground into a smooth paste known as galapóng. Coconut milk sweetened with sugar is boiled separately for around 10 minutes then filtered and mixed with the galapóng. The galapóng is then cooked in a pan while constantly stirring. When it becomes very thick in consistency, a bit of calamansi juice is spritzed on the mixture. It is then allowed to cool and then poured into greased banana leaves shaped into a cone. The cones are then steamed for an additional 20 minutes.

== Variants ==
The dish can be modified by adding other ingredients, like chocolate or strips of young coconut meat. The texture of sayongsong is very soft, reminiscent of both kalamay and puto. Sayongsong has a short shelf life and spoils after around a day, though it can be preserved for another day if chilled and placed in an airtight container. In Samar, sarungsong can also be cooked in shaved bamboo tubes that are then peeled open to eat.

In the Tagalog region, especially Southern Tagalog, a similar cone-shaped rice cake is also called balisungsong, but it is not sweet. The rice is also not flavored, though it is usually made more fragrant by the banana leaves or with added pandan leaves. It usually includes a mixture of rice varieties and is eaten with savory meals, much like pusô.

== See also ==
- Moron
- Suman
- Palitaw
- Bibingka
- Pastil
- Kakanin
