= Tupig =

Filipino cuisine

Tupíg
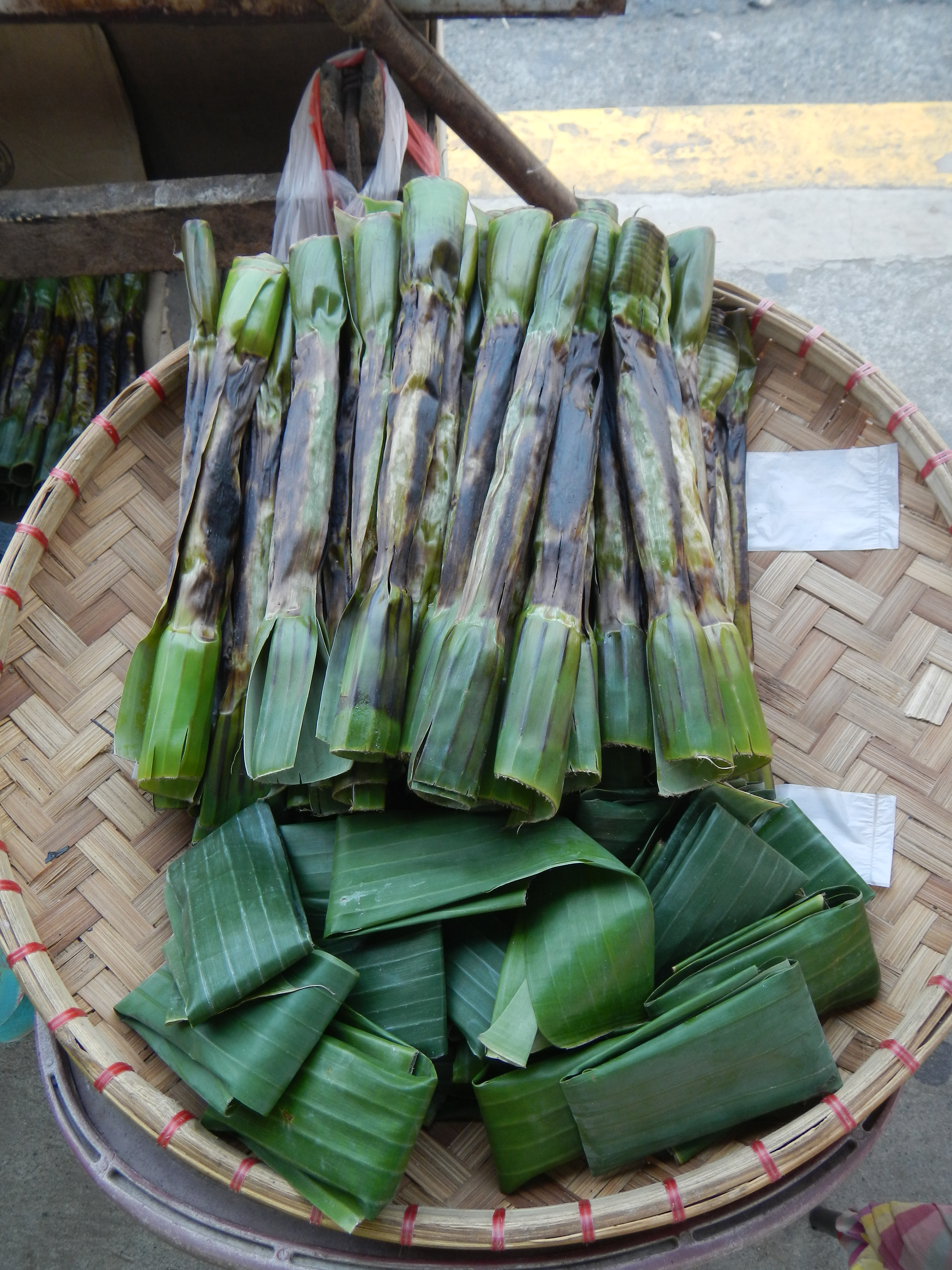
- Tupig sold as street food and pasalubong (homecoming gifts) along a roadside in Mangaldan, Pangasinan.
- Alternative names: Tinupíg or Intemtém
- Course: Dessert, Snack
- Place of origin: Philippines
- Region or state: Ilocos Region
- Serving temperature: Warm, Room temperature
- Main ingredients: Glutinous rice, muscovado, coconut milk, and young coconut strips
- Variations: Tinubong
- Similar dishes: Bibingka, Suman

Tupig, also known as tinupíg or intemtém, is a Filipino sticky rice dessert characterized by its thin, elongated, log-shaped form wrapped in banana leaves and cooked over charcoal, giving it a smoky aroma and chewy texture. It is typically made from glutinous rice flour that is soaked and lightly fermented, combined with muscovado sugar or molasses, coconut milk, and strips of young coconut meat. Originated in the Ilocos Region of northwestern Luzon, Philippines, and is considered a staple dessert among the Ilocano and Pangasinan people.

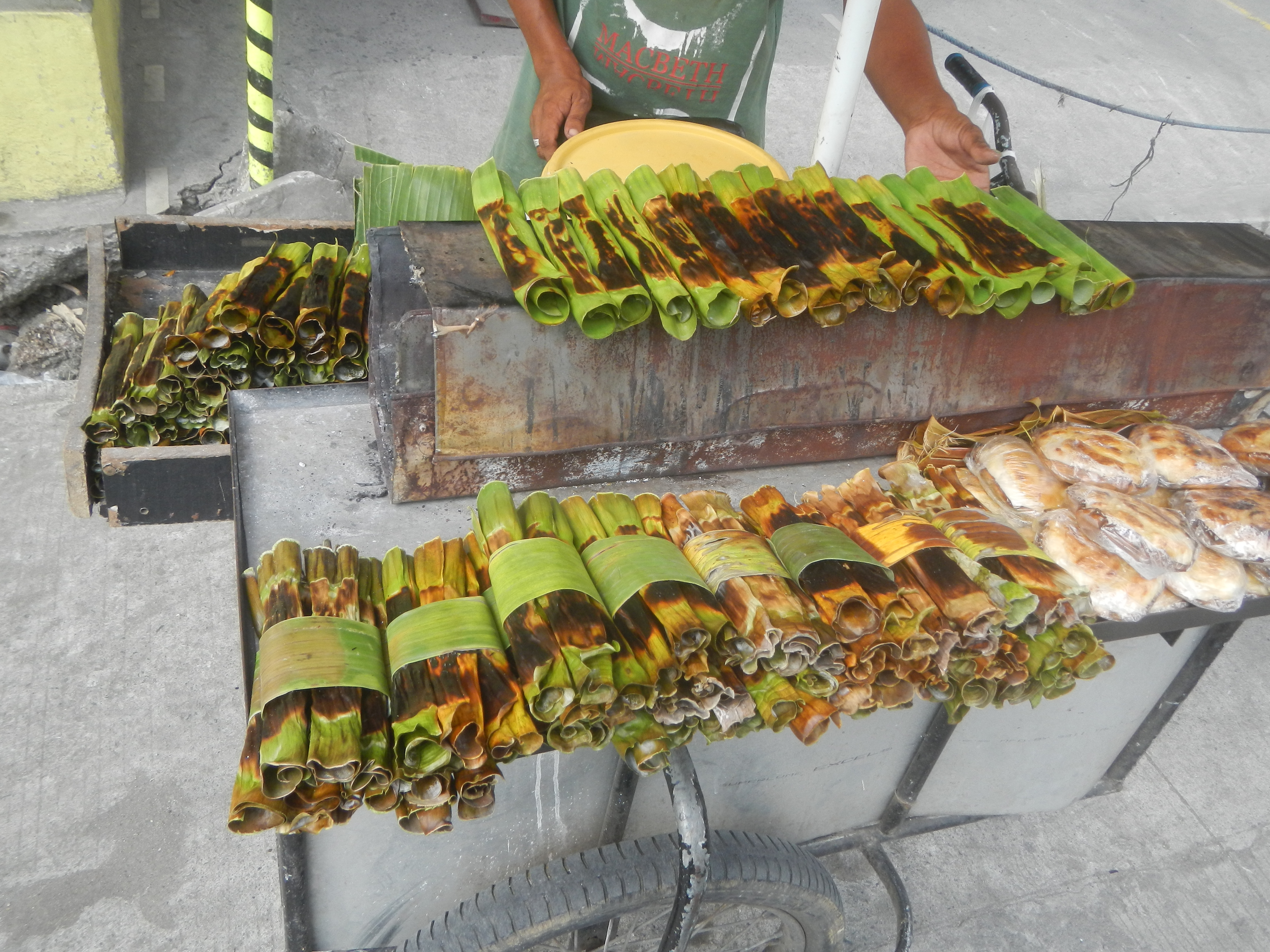
Tupig cart vendor with an improvised sheet metal grill selling the dessert as street food.

Tupig is widely sold as street food and as pasalubong (homecoming gifts), particularly in Ilocos, La Union, Pangasinan, Tarlac, and the Cagayan Valley. It is traditionally consumed during the Christmas season and is commonly paired with coffee or ginger tea (salabat). In Ilocano culture, tupig is also prepared as a food offering known as atang during All Saints’ Day and other commemorative rituals for the dead.

== Etymology ==
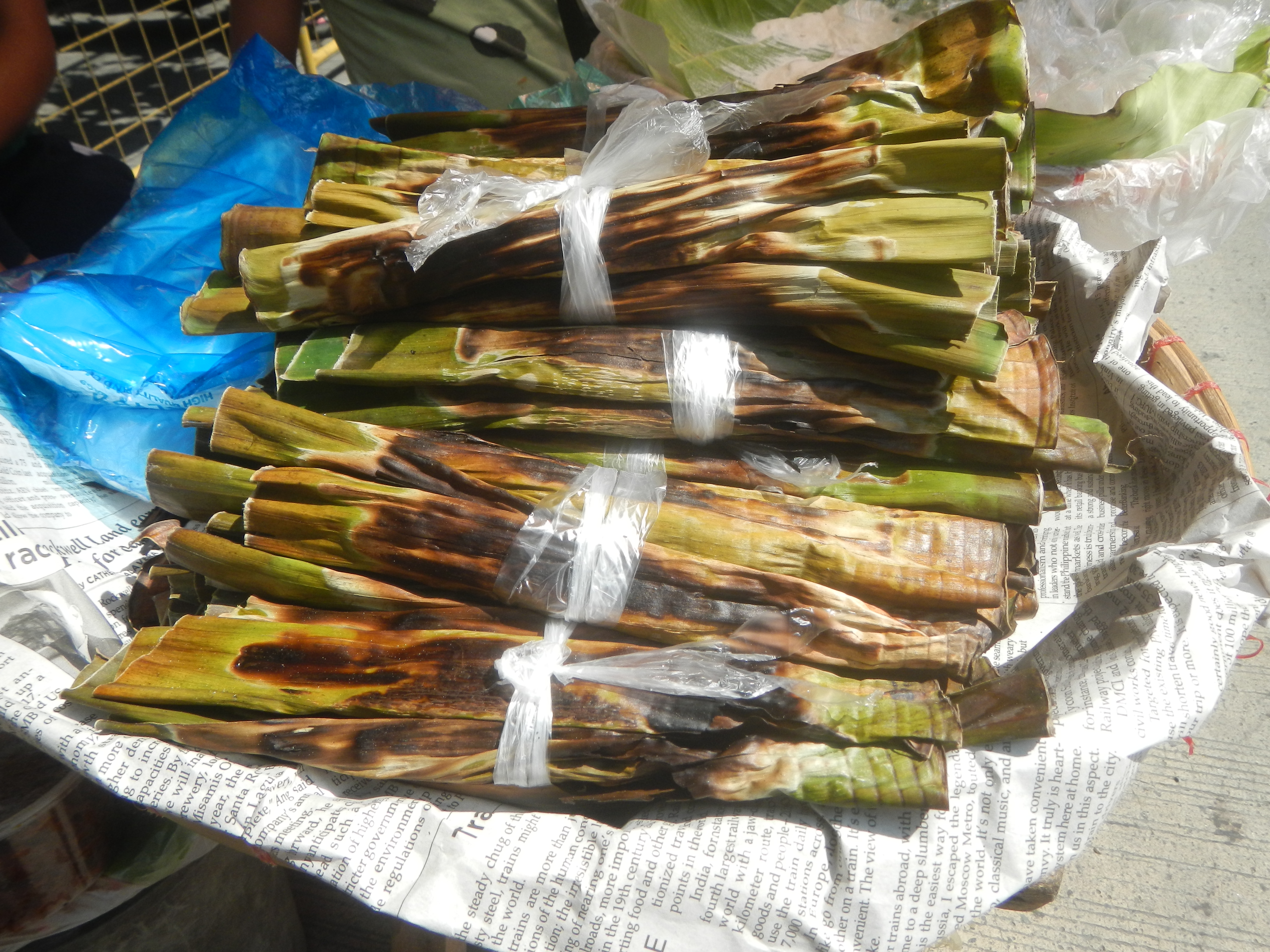
Tupig being sold as street food along a busy street in Quezon City

The term tupíg comes from the Ilocano language, meaning “flattened.” It is derived from the words tuno or tinúno, meaning “grilled,” and dippíg, meaning “flat” or “compressed,” referring to the dessert’s traditional preparation of flattening and grilling the rice mixture in banana leaves.

The alternative name intemtém is also of Ilocano origin, derived from the word temtém, meaning “bonfire,” with intemtém referring to something baked or cooked in hot ashes or over wood.

== Variation ==
Tupig varies across provinces in terms of ingredients, flavor, and cooking methods. In Ilocos, it is often compared to the Ilocano bibingka or royal bibingka, a dense, sticky, and chewy rice cake made with glutinous rice flour, coconut milk, eggs, and butter, which shares a similar texture and taste with tupig.

A notable regional variant is tinubong from Ilocos, which uses the same ingredients as tupig—glutinous rice flour, coconut milk, sugar, and strips of coconut—but is cooked inside bamboo tubes buried in embers. The name is derived from the Ilocano word tubong, meaning “internode of a bamboo.”

== See also ==
- Bibingka
- Panyalam
- Suman
- Puto bumbong
