= Binakle =

Type of steamed rice cake

- Course: Dessert, Snack
- Place of origin: Philippines
- Region or state: Ifugao
- Serving temperature: Warm, room temperature

Binakle is a type of steamed rice cake originating from the Ifugao province of the Philippines. It is made from glutinous rice (diket) that is pounded into a paste, wrapped in banana or rattan leaves, and steamed. Variants may also add sesame seeds or sweet potato. They are popularly eaten on special occasions or as a snack. Uncooked binakle, along with rice wine (baya), are common offerings to the bulul ancestor spirits in Ifugao rituals.

== See also ==
- Binaki
- Suman
- Nilupak
