= Binalot =

Technique in Filipino cuisine

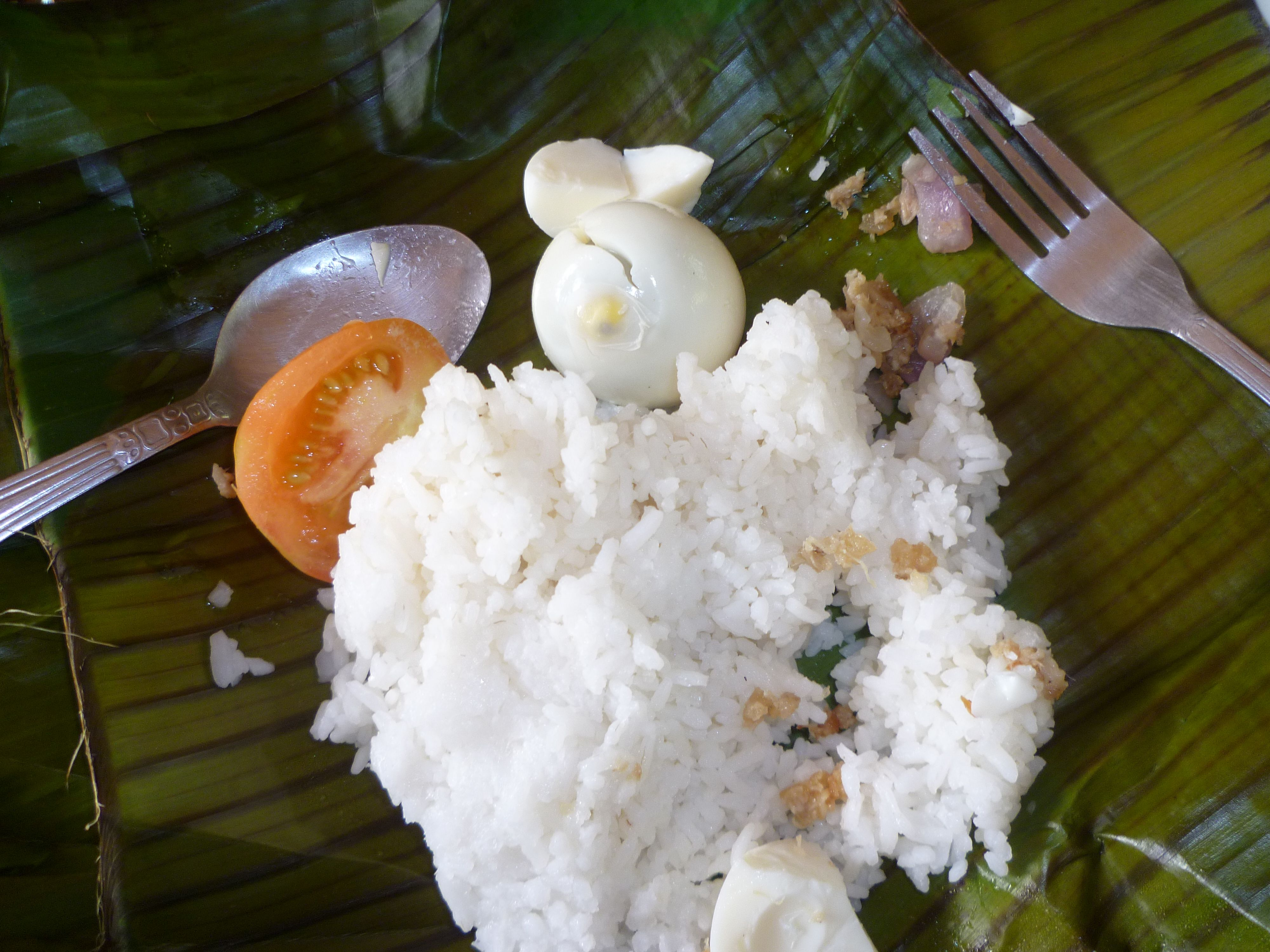
- Course: Main dish
- Place of origin: Philippines
- Similar dishes: pastil, pusô, suman

Binalot is a method of wrapping and serving food in the Philippines using banana leaves and alike. The term is derived from the root word balot (wrap) + -in- meaning "wrapped". This wrapping technique can be combined with a variety of dishes, including meat like pork and chicken. In 2017 binalot was presented by Filipino chefs in Washington through a range of 800 dishes. It is considered a traditional culinary technique of the Philippines.

== Legacy ==
The word was adopted as the name of the Filipino restaurant chain Binalot Fiesta Foods, commonly known as Binalot, which serves Filipino staples such as adobo and tocino in traditional binalot style, presented in a contemporary fast-food setting. Founded in 1996 in Makati, the chain later expanded nationwide through delivery and franchising. As of 2025, the chain operates 29 branches across 10 cities in Metro Manila, as well as one in Antipolo, and five in Cavite.

== See also ==
- Pastil - A similar but Halal meal whose preparation requires adherence to Muslim standards.
- Pusô
- Suman - A ricecake.
- Bibingka
