= Oko-oko =

Filipino sea urchin and rice dish

- Alternative names: Oko'-oko', Oku-oku, Ketupat tehe tehe, Nasi tehe tehe
- Course: Main dish
- Place of origin: Philippines
- Region or state: Tawi-Tawi, Sulu, Basilan, Zamboanga Peninsula, Sabah, and diaspora communities

Oko-oko is a Filipino dish consisting of rice cooked inside a whole sea urchin shell. It originates from the Sama-Bajau people. It is a common delicacy in Tawi-Tawi, Sulu, Basilan, and the Zamboanga Peninsula. It has also been introduced by Sama migrants to Sabah, Malaysia, where it is known as ketupat tehe-tehe or nasi tehe-tehe.

Oko-oko is prepared with a specific type of sea urchins called tehe'-tehe' (also transcribed as tehe-tehe). The spines are first scraped off and the entrails removed through a small hole at the bottom. The edible gonads are retained. Uncooked rice mixed with spices and various ingredients are then poured into the hole. The hole is plugged with pandan or coconut leaves. It is then boiled whole until the rice is cooked. Oko-oko is eaten by cracking the shell and peeling it like a hard-boiled egg. The compacted rice inside with the salty sea urchin gonads are eaten directly while held, similar to leaf-wrapped rice cakes.

== See also ==
- Piutu
- Pusô
