= Pusô =

Filipino rice cake

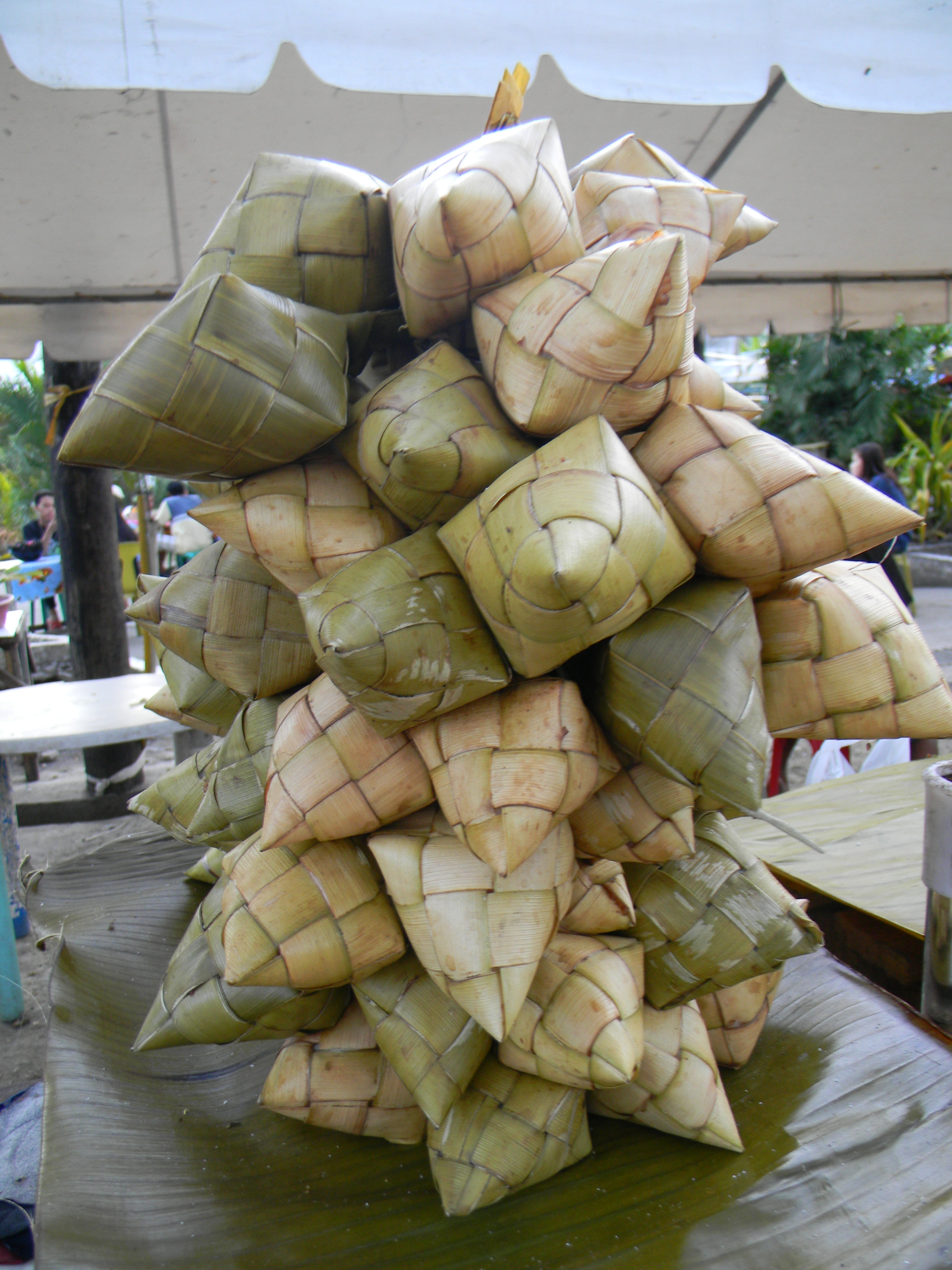
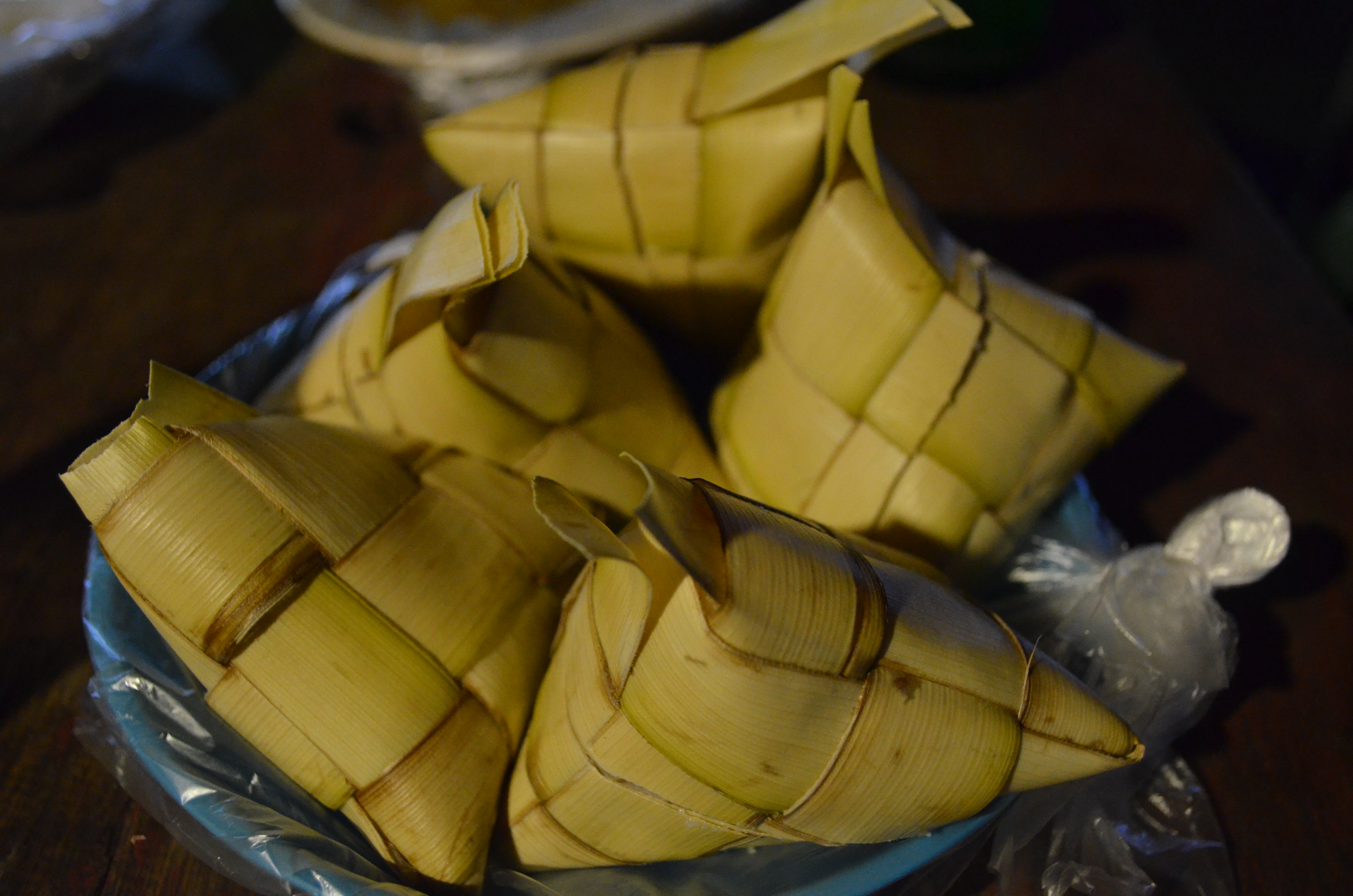
- Top: Pusô literally means ("hanging rice") in Cebuano, pusô from Cebu; Bottom: binakî ("frog-shaped") langbay from Tacloban
- Alternative names: hanging rice, poso, pusó, langbay, lambay, linambay, bugnóy, patupat, katumpat, piyoso, pyiusopusu, sinambong, ta’mu, temu, tamu, tam-o
- Course: Main course
- Place of origin: Philippines
- Serving temperature: Hot or room temperature
- Main ingredients: Rice cooked inside of pouch made from woven young palm leaves

Pusô [puˈsoʔ] or tamu, sometimes known in Philippine English as "hanging rice", is a Filipino rice cake made by boiling rice in a woven pouch of palm leaves. It is most commonly found in octahedral, diamond, or rectangular shapes, but it can also come in various other intricately woven complex forms. It is known under many different names throughout the Philippines with numerous variations, but it is usually associated with the street food cultures of the Visayan and Moro peoples.

Pusô refers to the way of cooking and serving rice on woven leaves, and thus does not refer to a specific recipe. It can actually refer to many different ways of preparing rice, ranging from plain, to savory or sweet. Regardless, all of them are woven pouches where rice is poured inside and cooked by boiling. Pusô are differentiated from other leaf-wrapped Filipino dishes like suman, binalot, and pastil, in that the latter use leaves that are simply wrapped around the food and folded or tied. Pusô, in contrast, uses intricate woven leaves as the pouch.

Pusô is traditionally prepared as a way to pack rice for journeys and is eaten held in the hands while standing, usually paired with meat or seafood cooked on skewers (inihaw or satti). It is still eaten this way from street food peddlers (pungkò-pungkò). In seated dining, it is commonly cut into pieces and served on a plate in place of regular rice.

Pusô were once culturally important among pre-Hispanic Filipinos as offerings to the diwatà spirits and as an extension of the basic skill of weaving among women. It became linked to festivities since they were commonly served during religious events, especially the more complex woven variations. It is still used in rituals in some parts of the Philippines today, though the rituals themselves have been mostly Christianized. Similarly, it remained culturally important to Muslim Filipinos, where it became symbolic of the Hari Raya feast.

Pusô is related to similar dishes in other rice-farming Austronesian cultures, most notably the ketupat found across Maritime Southeast Asia. A very similar octahedron-shaped version called katupat was also found in pre-colonial Guam, before the ancient rice cultivation in the island was replaced by corn brought by the Spanish. In the Philippines, puso is commonly eaten with roasted chicken (lechon manok) or other grilled dishes.

== Names ==
Pusô (also spelled puso, poso, or pusó) literally means "heart" in Cebuano, due to its resemblance to a heart with the two loose ends of the coconut leaf emerging at the top resembling the aorta and the venae cavae. Its other most common name, patupat, originally means "four-cornered [rectangle or cube]", a reduplication of Proto-Malayo-Polynesian *epat ("four"). This form is still evident in old Chamorro cognate atupat.

Pusô is also known by various names in different ethnic groups in the Philippines, including piyusopusó in Mindoro languages; piyoso in Maranao, Iranun and Maguindanaon; langbay, lambay, or linambay in Waray; bugnóy in Hiligaynon; tam-o in Aklanon; tamu, ta’mu, or temu in Tausug and Yakan; pusú in Kapampangan, patupát (La Union, Pangasinan, and Cagayan Valley), sinambong (Ilocos Sur and Ilocos Norte) or inkaldit in Ilocano and Pangasinan; and katumpat in Sama-Bajau.

== Description ==
Pusô does not refer to a specific recipe, rather it is a way of packaging and serving rice. Therefore, it can actually refer to many different ways of preparing rice, ranging from plain, to savory or sweet. Regardless, all of them are woven pouches where rice is poured inside and cooked by boiling. As the rice cooks, it is prevented from spreading by the pouch, resulting in a compacted cake-like texture. It can be made with either regular white rice or glutinous rice poured into a pre-woven container and then immersed in a boiling liquid. It is commonly plain, but it can be cooked with meat or flavored with gatâ (coconut milk) and spices like salt or ginger. Other variants of the dish can also be sweet and can be cooked with muscovado sugar.

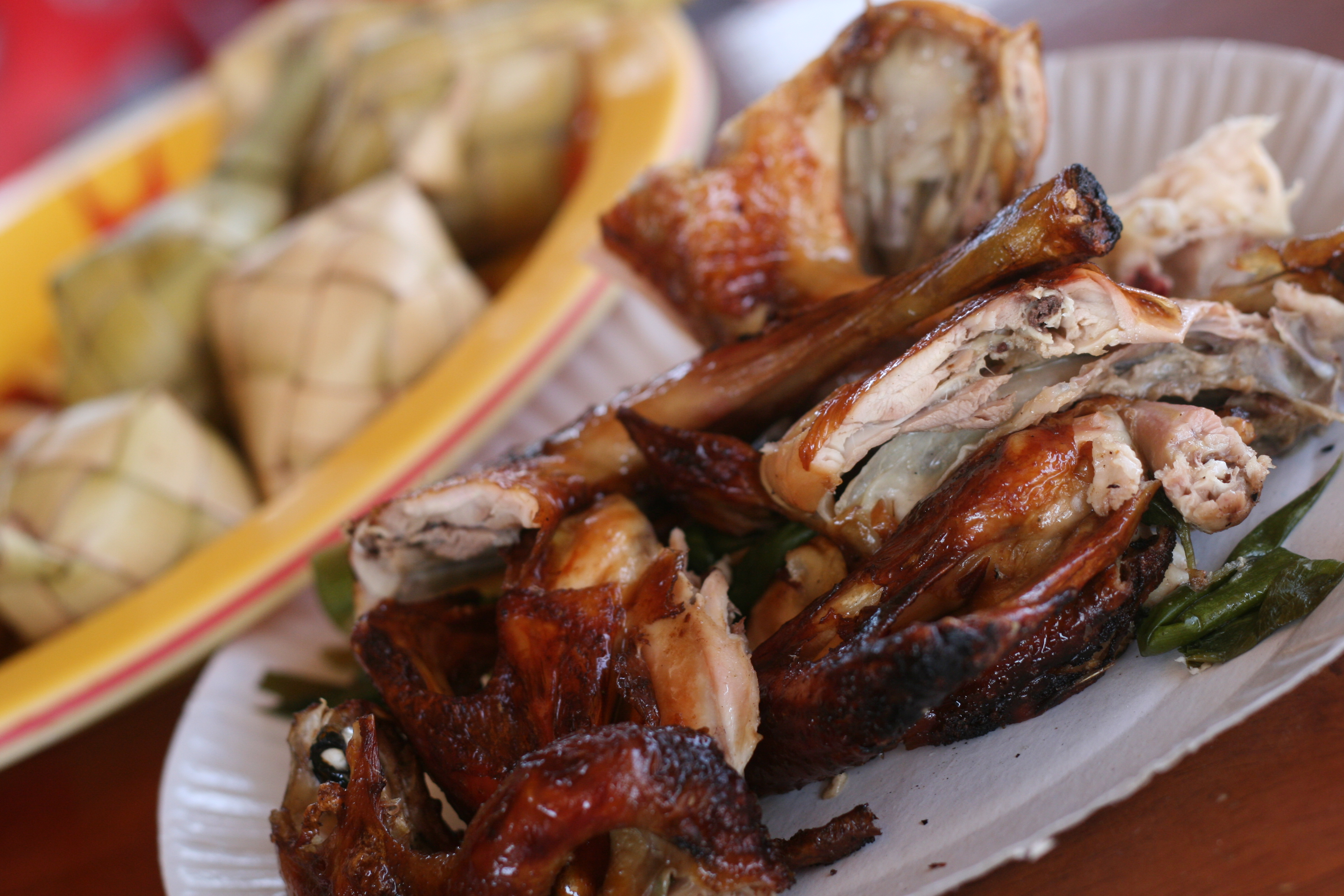
Lechon manok (roast chicken) served with pusô

Pusô are differentiated from other leaf-wrapped Filipino dishes like the Tagalog binalot and the Maguindanao pastil, as well as various kakanín snacks wrapped in leaves found throughout the Philippines, like suman and morón. These dishes all use leaves that are simply wrapped around the food and folded or tied. They are not woven into complex patterns unlike pusô.

Leaf-weaving is an ancient art in the Philippines and is used to make various traditional handicrafts like baskets, hats, mats, toys, sidings, and even religious decorations (both in ancient anitism and in modern Christian Palm Sunday celebrations). Food, as well, is commonly wrapped in woven leaves, the most commonly used being banana or coconut leaves. It makes them aesthetically pleasing, practical to eat, and infuses the food with the aroma of the leaves.

Pusô pouches are almost always woven from coconut leaves, though they can also be made from other palm species or from pandan leaves. The coconut leaves used are freshly sprouted, usually pale yellow to light green in color and far more pliable than older leaves. These young leaves are known as lukáy in most Visayan regions; palaspas, usbong, talbos, or ibus in Southern Luzon; dugokan in Leyte; ugbos in Bohol; uyok in Masbate; and langkóy in Bicol. There are numerous techniques by which they can be woven, which has translated into many different kinds of pusô.

Weavers of pusô are traditionally known as mamumusô or manlalah in Cebuano.

== Cultural significance ==
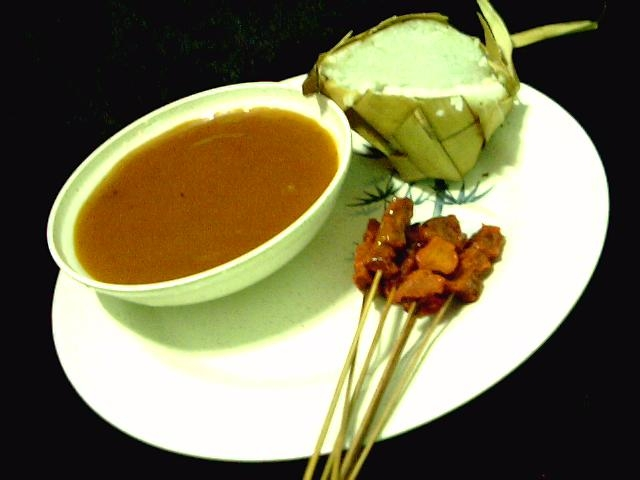
Tausūg ta'mu is commonly served with satti in peanut sauce

Pusô originated from a method of cooking and packing rice. It was also prominent in religious rituals in the anitism of pre-colonial Filipinos. The smaller or more elaborate versions were a traditional part of the food offerings to the diwatà spirits, a tradition the Spanish referred to as ofrendas. These traditions have been increasingly forgotten or syncretized as Filipinos converted to Christianity and Islam in the last few centuries.

Rituals involving pusô in the past in Cebuano religion include harang sa mga kalag (ritual preventing the deceased from affecting the living); sagangsang (ritual for tubâ palm wine gatherers); damit (pre-harvest ritual); buhat silang (a thanksgiving post-harvest ritual); tigpo (ritual asking for forgiveness from spirits of the dead); and balangkisaw (ritual asking for forgiveness from water spirits).

Nevertheless, it still survives in some (Christianized) rituals today, like in the pamisa (Catholic prayer for the dead). It is also still a regular part of the ofrenda. Though in modern times the offering is usually to the household Catholic altar or to deceased loved ones, and not to diwatà spirits.

Among Muslim Filipinos, it also survives as a festive food, and is very popular during a lot of Islamic holidays. It is particularly associated with the Hari Raya celebrations at the end of Ramadan.

== Variations ==
Pusô can be made in many different shapes using a wide variety of techniques. Some ethnic groups have numerous traditional variants, while in other ethnic groups, it is restricted to one or two. A lot of the techniques are also shared across ethnic groups and may be known under different names, indicating shared origins or cultural exchange between the groups in pre-colonial Philippines.

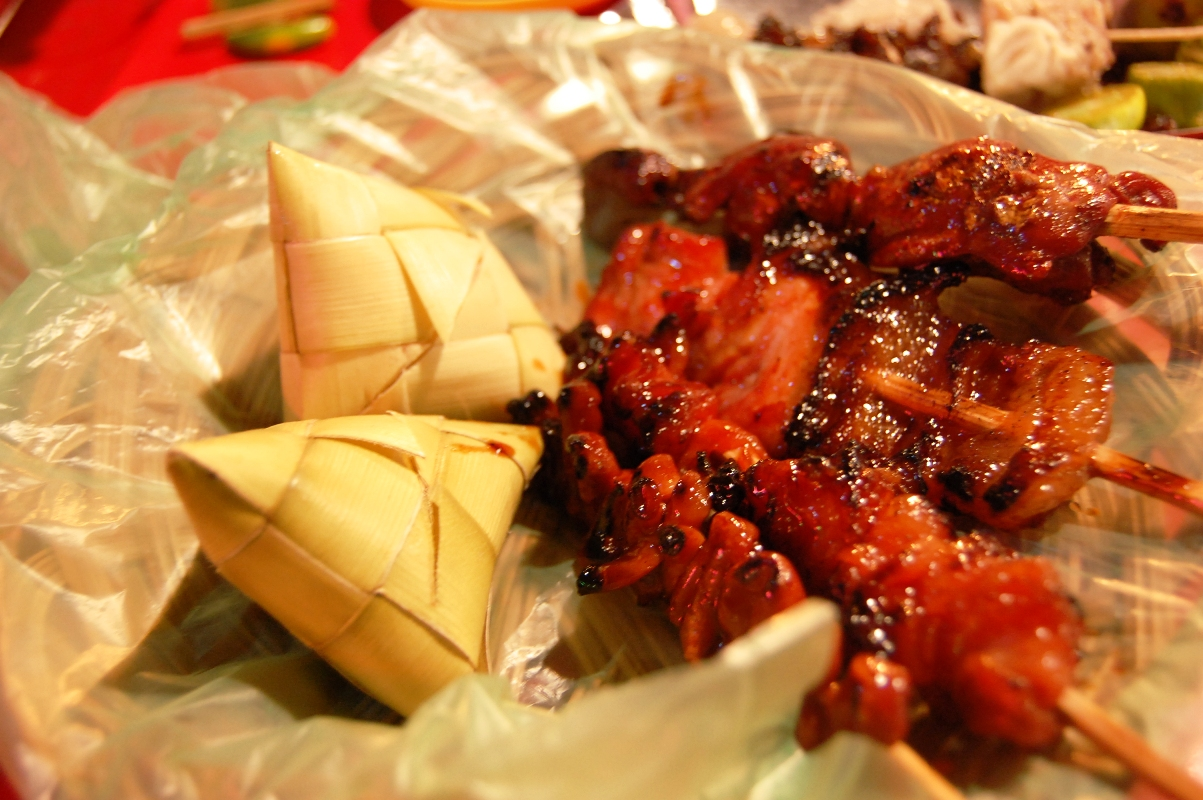
Binaki-style pusô with inihaw (Filipino barbecue)

- Binakî – also bakì-bakì, meaning "frog-like". This widespread version resembles a sitting frog with five angular points. It is made from a single strand with the loose end emerging opposite the frond base. It is also known as kongkang among the Palawan people, also a reference to its frog-like shape. It is known as uwan-uwan ("little pillow") among the Sama Bajau people and as piyusopusú (a type of bird) among the Mangyan people. Other names for it in Cebuano-speaking areas include bina-bà ("mouthful"), and sinayóp (evolving from Old Visayan sinaop, meaning "clasped hands"). It is also referred to as bayi tam-o ("female tam-o") among the Aklanon people, probably because it resembles breasts. It is also the version historically referred to as lambay, langbay, linambay, or linangbay, literally "crab-like".
- Patupát – also known as patopat, sinambong or indaldit, is a delicacy from the Ilocos Region and Cagayan Valley of northern Luzon and is commonly served as a dessert among Ilocano people, where it is not prepared in a plain or savory form. It is made from díket (glutinous rice) soaked in gettá (coconut milk) and placed in a woven rectangular pouch made from coconut or buri palm leaves. The filled pouch is then boiled in bennál (sugarcane juice) or sinakob (jaggery). In Balungao, Pangasinan, a variation uses buri palm sap or juice instead of sugarcane juice. It is also known as tikob among Tagalogs. Both names refer to its rectangular shape.
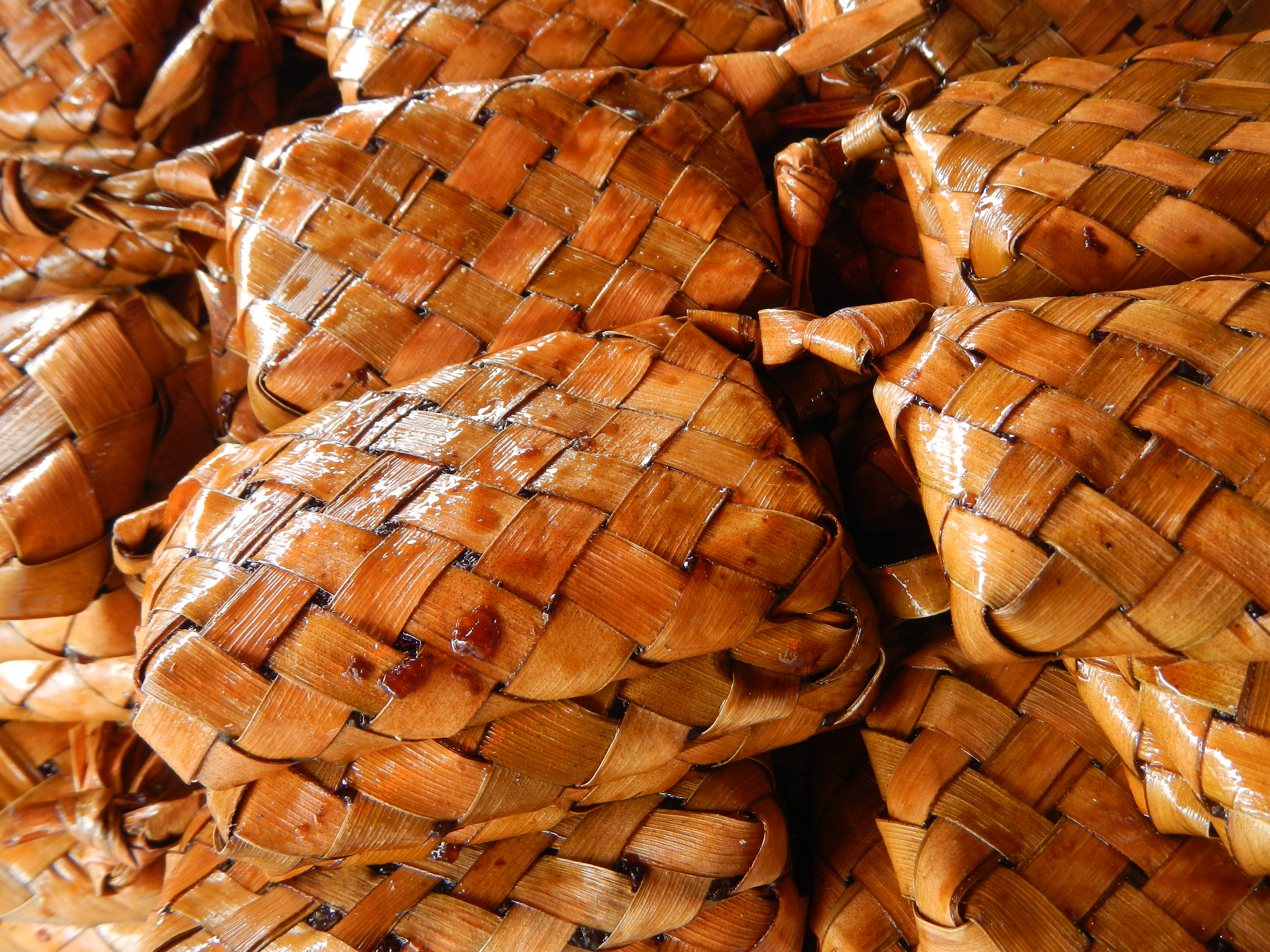
  Patupat, also known as sinambong or inkaldit, is boiled in sugarcane juice and originated from the Ilocos Region.
- Ibos – is a dessert version from Capiz. The preparation is similar to some of the common varieties, except that it always comes with a sauce called lasaw (a thick sweet sauce made by boiling a coconut milk with muscovado sugar). It is usually served during festivities, especially during the lent and halloween season. It is also prepared as an afternoon snack for kids attending the catechesis.
- Binangkito – also binangkaso, a complex version from Anda, Bohol that resembles an upside-down bangkò (a stool with four legs), usually used as a ritual offering on lantayan altars.
- Binosa – the smallest type of pusô. It is woven from a single strand and is shaped like a wineglass. It is unique in that it is almost always used as an offering to diwatà spirits. They are from the town of Taptap in Cebu. A similar variant is called inumol in Anda, Bohol and like binosa is also used as spirit offerings.
- Binungî – literally "extracted tooth". Another small version from Talamban, Cebu, although this one is made for fun, rather than as a ritual offering. It resembles a molar, with a wide top and a base with short protrusions.
- Bulasa – very small pusô from Negros Oriental that contain more or less only a handful of rice. They often contain kakanin (rice-based desserts) and are served during feasts and weddings. It is also known as tamu lugus ("areca nut tamu") among the Yakan people and kimes a datu ("[rice clenched] in the hand of the "datu") among the Maranao people.
- Hellu – a somewhat diagonal elongated version from the Tausug people. It is very rare and isn't anymore used to cook rice. It may be the same pattern named as bayubayo by Spanish sources.
- Kambing – literally "goat-like". A Yakan version similar to the Cebuano minanok, but it has additional details that make it resemble a goat instead of a chicken.

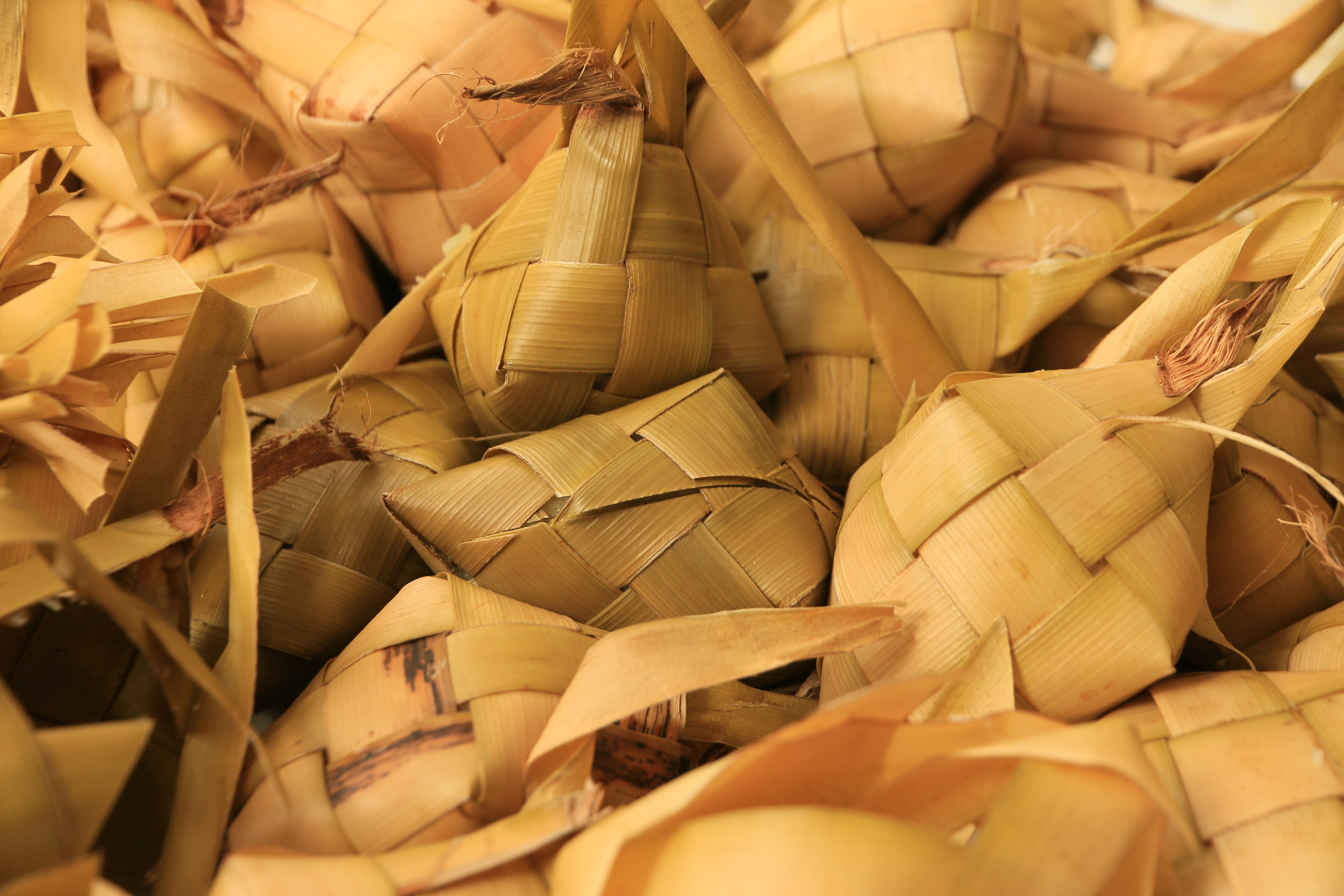
Pusô from Cebu

- Pusô – is a Cebuano term for hanging rice. It is woven from two strands with the loose ends emerging from the top where the base of the fronds also emerge. It is the most common version found in Cebuano-speaking regions, including Cebu, Camiguin, Northern Mindanao, and Sarangani.
- Kumò – a two-strand version from Samar woven to resemble a clenched fist. Like the binosa, they are often used solely as offerings.
- Manan-aw – a rare version found in Cebu. "Manan-aw" is the local Cebuano common name of the moon orchid (Phalaenopsis amabilis). This variant is named after its resemblance to its flowers. It is very large, even larger than pinawikan, and is made with eight strips.
- Minanók – literally "chicken-like". A version from Taptap, Cebu that is shaped like a chicken. It is used as a ritual offering. Also known as lánggam ("bird"), not to be confused with langgám in Tagalog.
- Pat bettes – literally "cow hooves". A triangular pyramid-shaped version, very common among the Tausug people. It has four corners at the base, and three corners on each side meeting to a point.
- Pinagbutasan – probably the same version used in the pagbutas funerary ritual described by Spanish sources. Although modern folk etymology attribute the origin of its name to a story about a datu who married a second wife and was abandoned by his first wife after he offered her the smaller portion of the pusô he had cut in half. It is triangular in shape with the leaf base and the loose ends emerging out at one point.
- Pinawikan – literally meaning "sea turtle-like". Also known as binadbaranay ("unraveling"), pinagi (ray-like), and binalek ("returned"). It is a large version made with four strands whose loose ends are woven back into the other strands. It is commonly found in Cebu and Negros Oriental.
- Pudol – also tinigib or dumpol, meaning "cut off". Resembles kinasing and is woven similarly, but the pointed tip at the bottom is flattened. It is also known as buwah pagung ("nipa palm fruit") among Sama-Bajau, and tamu sibulyas ("onion tamu") in Tausug.
- Pusô - the glutinous rice (known as pilit in various Visayan languages) is woven in young nipa palm leaves in the tinigib (chisel-shape) style which is often made in pairs that are tied together. This is then boiled in tam-is which is the freshly gathered unfermented sweet nipa palm sap called tuba sang nipa (that is sometimes pre-boiled to prevent immediate fermentation upon gathering it and produces a reddish-brown solution). The finished product is a sweet sticky reddish-brown rice cake with the nipa palm leaves also becoming reddish-brown in color, and the tam-is becoming a thick reddish-brown syrup which becomes the latik na tuba (nipa palm syrup) served with the dish. Unlike most other pusô variants, this one is considered a kakanin, a snack or dessert that can be eaten alone instead of being a replacement for plain rice which is used to compliment a main dish. It originates from the municipality of Panay, Capiz.
- Tamu Bawang – literally "garlic tamu". A Tausug version that resembles the Cebuano kinasing, except that the loose ends emerge from one of the corners in the center, and not at the ends.
- Tamu Buyung Kambing – literally "goat's scrotum tamu". A Yakan version shaped like two small pouches merging in the middle.
- Tamu Duwa Susu – literally "two nipples tamu". A Yakan version named for the two corners on its upper side.
- Tamu Pinad – the most common version used by Tausug people for Hari Raya festivities. The name means "diamond-shaped tamu" because it has a flattened diamond shape. It is the most similar to Indonesian ketupat.
- Tamu Sumbay – a Yakan version that resembles a basket called sumbay. It has a wide base and a narrow top, somewhat resembling a woman's handbag.
- Tamu Tempipih – a Yakan version named after a similarly shaped basket. It resembles the Tausug pinad with one corner cut off.
- Tinumpei – a complex version from the Yakan people similar to the binangkito, except that the points are flattened, making it look like a four-pointed star. The name refers to the tumpei, a traditional bag used by Yakan farmers. It may possibly be the same pattern named as binitoon by Spanish sources among Visayans.
- Ulona a babak – a version from the Maranao people identical in construction to the patupat but isn't used to hold sweetened rice. The name literally means "pillow of the monkey". It may also be the tambong and binairan versions mentioned by Spanish sources.

== History ==
Leaf-wrapped dishes are one of the earliest native Filipino food described by the Spaniards when they arrived in the Philippines. The first recorded mention of rice cooked in leaves is by Antonio Pigafetta who wrote in 1525 of a Visayan meal of rice and millet wrapped in leaves served with roast fish.

There are six main accounts of pusô among Visayans published in Vocabularios (dictionaries) of Spanish priests during the Spanish colonial period of the Philippines. Their authors often describe numerous variants varying by shape and weaving patterns, ranging from simple geometric shapes to complex shapes imitating objects or animals. But without illustrations, it is hard to imagine what they looked like, much less how they were made. Nevertheless, they give a glimpse of how complex the traditional pusô were during the pre-Hispanic period, although some of these forms have now been lost.

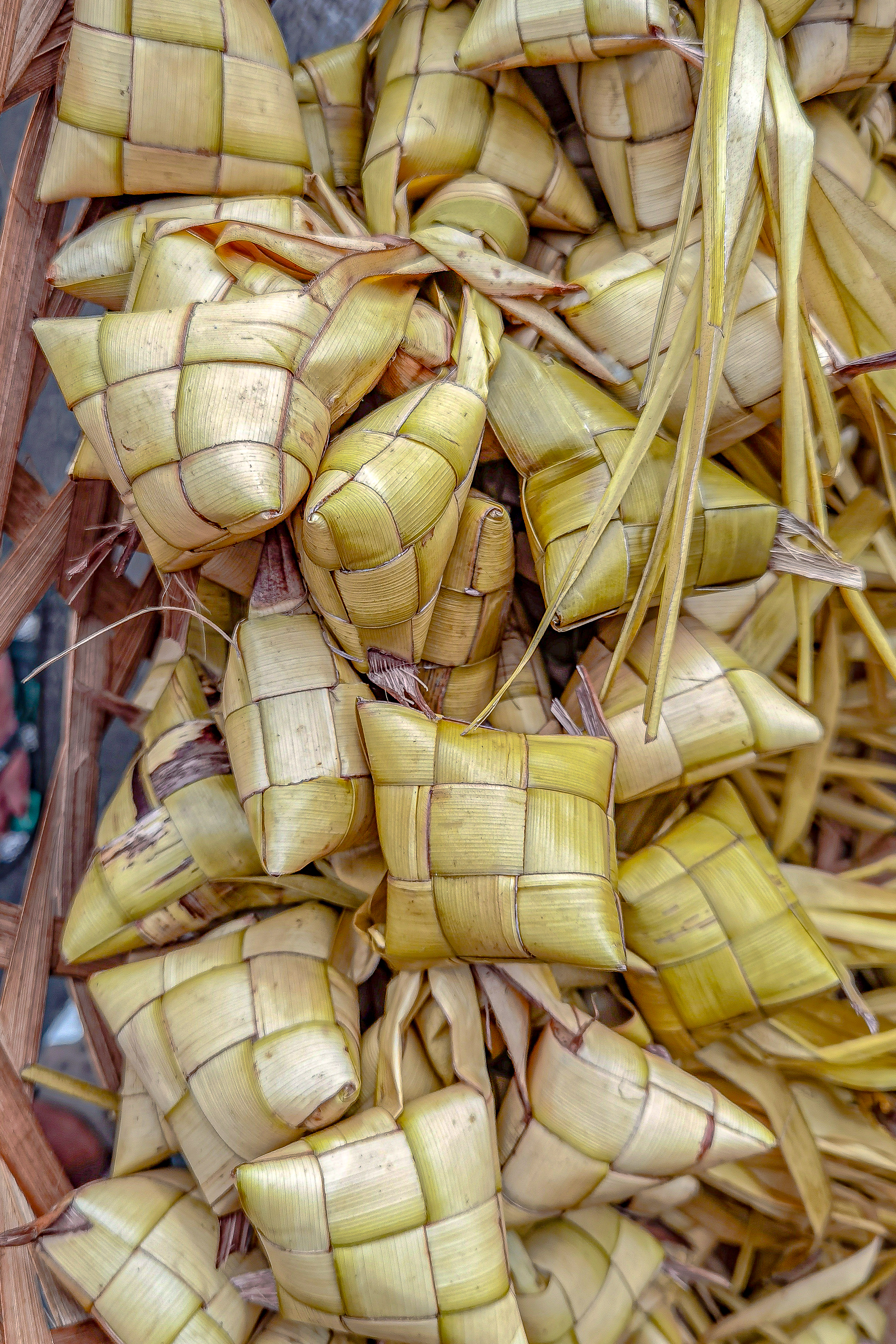
A pile of pusô being sold in Cebu

Fray Mateo Sánchez, a Jesuit priest stationed in Dagami, Leyte, is the first to describe pusô by name (as "poso") in his Vocabulario de la lengua Bisaya (1615–1617). He describes it as being made by women. He also lists fourteen types of pusô. They include tambong, which was flat and rectangular; binairan, brick-shaped like a whetstone; and bayobayo, which was cylindrical-shaped like a small pestle. He also describes others that are even more intricately shaped, like cumol sin datu, shaped like a clenched fist; linalaqui, shaped like male genitalia; binabaye, shaped like breasts; sinaop, shaped like two hands clasped together; tinicod, shaped like the heel of the foot; linangbay or linambay, shaped like a crab; binitoon, shaped like a star; bung̃an gapas, shaped like a kapok fruit; binabao or pinavican, shaped like a turtle shell; and ynamo or inamo, shaped like a monkey's head.

Alonso de Méntrida in his Diccionario de la lengua Bisaya, Hiligueina y Haraya de la Isla de Panay (1618) describes six kinds of pusô among the Cebuano, Ilonggo and Karay-a people of Panay. His list repeats some of those mentioned by Sánchez. He includes poso nga linalaque, which he describes as "esquinado" ("angular"); poso nga pinaouican, shaped like a turtle; poso nga binouaya, shaped like a crocodile; poso nga ibaiba, shaped like an iba (rice basket or jar); poso nga galangan, shaped like galangan (star fruit); and poso nga paholan, shaped like the small piece of wood worn around the waist by fishermen to attach fishing lines on.

Francisco Ignacio Alcina also described the Visayan "posos" in his Historia de las islas e indios de Bisayas (1668). He described them as a ritual offering during the pagabo or saragunting ritual, a paganito animistic ritual to the diwata (spirit) of the fireplace. He notes that once consecrated to the diwata spirits, the "posos" are left alone and never opened. Like Sánchez, he describes different types of pusô, namely the linangang, woven with almost white coconut leaves in the shape of a small bird; and ginawig, woven into the shape of a large hen.

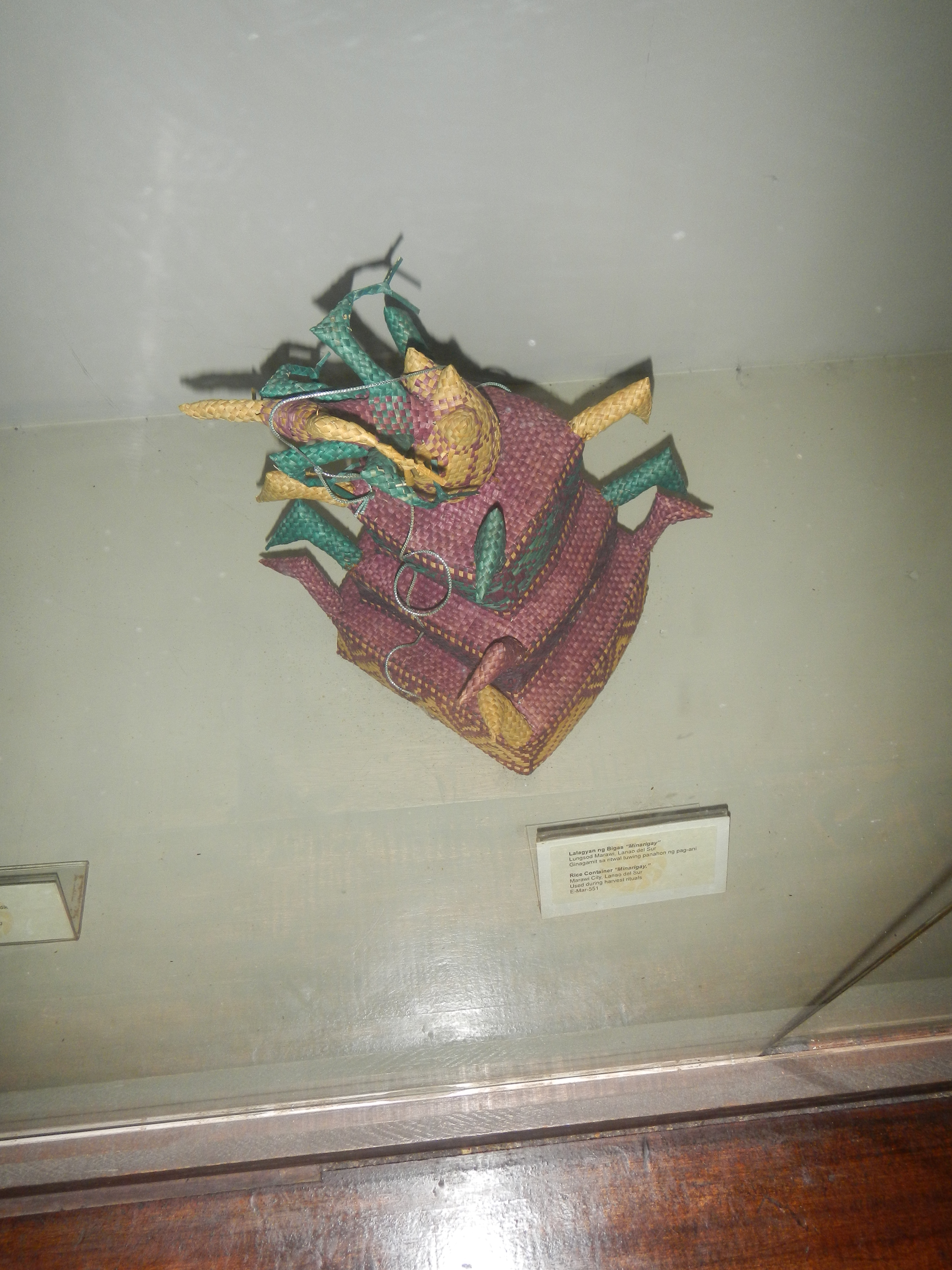
Minarigay, a woven rice container used in harvest rituals of the Maranao people

Another ceremony that uses pusô described by Alcina is the pagbutas, which was done after a burial ceremony of the dead. The relatives and friends of the deceased would weave a pusô and tie them all together in a large plate of water. The daitan shaman would then cut each pusô away while praying, signifying the separation of the living from the recently departed.

Juan Jose Delgado, another Jesuit priest stationed in Guiguan (modern Guiuan), Samar, writes about taking pusô with him on trips to the forest to cut wood in his Historia general, sacro-profana, politica y natural de las Islas del poniente llamadas Filipinas (1751). He praised the way it kept the rice fresh longer. He also mentions how the pusô is cooked with meat inside in large cauldrons called baon. Though he does not name them, he also describes numerous variations of the weaving patterns, ranging from round, square, or rectangular-shaped. He also remarks upon the skill in weaving even among children who make the pouches, likening their creations to the Gordian knot.

In the late 19th and early 20th century Vocabularias, there are only brief mentions of pusô. Juan Félix de la Encarnacion in 1885 describes pusô as a kind of pouch filled with rice. Although he does also mention pinaoican and pinapagan as separate dishes. Antonio Sanchez de la Rosa in his Diccionario español-bisaya para las provincias de Sámar y Leyte (1914) lists pusô under lambay and langbay, the modern Waray name for pusô derived from the "crab" version that Sánchez described three centuries earlier. He describes it as being a "bolsa de figura de corazon" ("heart-shaped pouch") used to cook rice or rice in coconut milk.

== Similar dishes ==
Pusô is related to similar dishes in other rice-farming Austronesian cultures, like the Indonesian ketupat, although the latter refers strictly to the diamond or triangular-shaped variants. Ketupat are also woven differently, the leaf base and the loose leaf strands do not exit at the same point, as in most Filipino puso. They are also popularly associated with Eid al-Fitr like the tamu of Muslim Filipinos. Ketupat somewhat resemble the tamu pinad version among Muslim Filipinos the most, which are shaped like a flattened diamond, although they are also woven differently. In Hindu Bali, a similar diamond-shaped variant called the ketipat or tipat is used as an offering to the rice goddess Dewi Sri.

An octahedron-shaped version called atupat was also found in pre-colonial Guam, before the ancient rice cultivation in the island was replaced by corn brought by the Spanish.

== See also ==
- Balisungsong
- Binalot
- Suman
- Lamban
- Lontong
- Oko-oko
- Pastil
- Zongzi
