= Morón (food) =

Type of rice cake native to the Eastern Visayas, Philippines

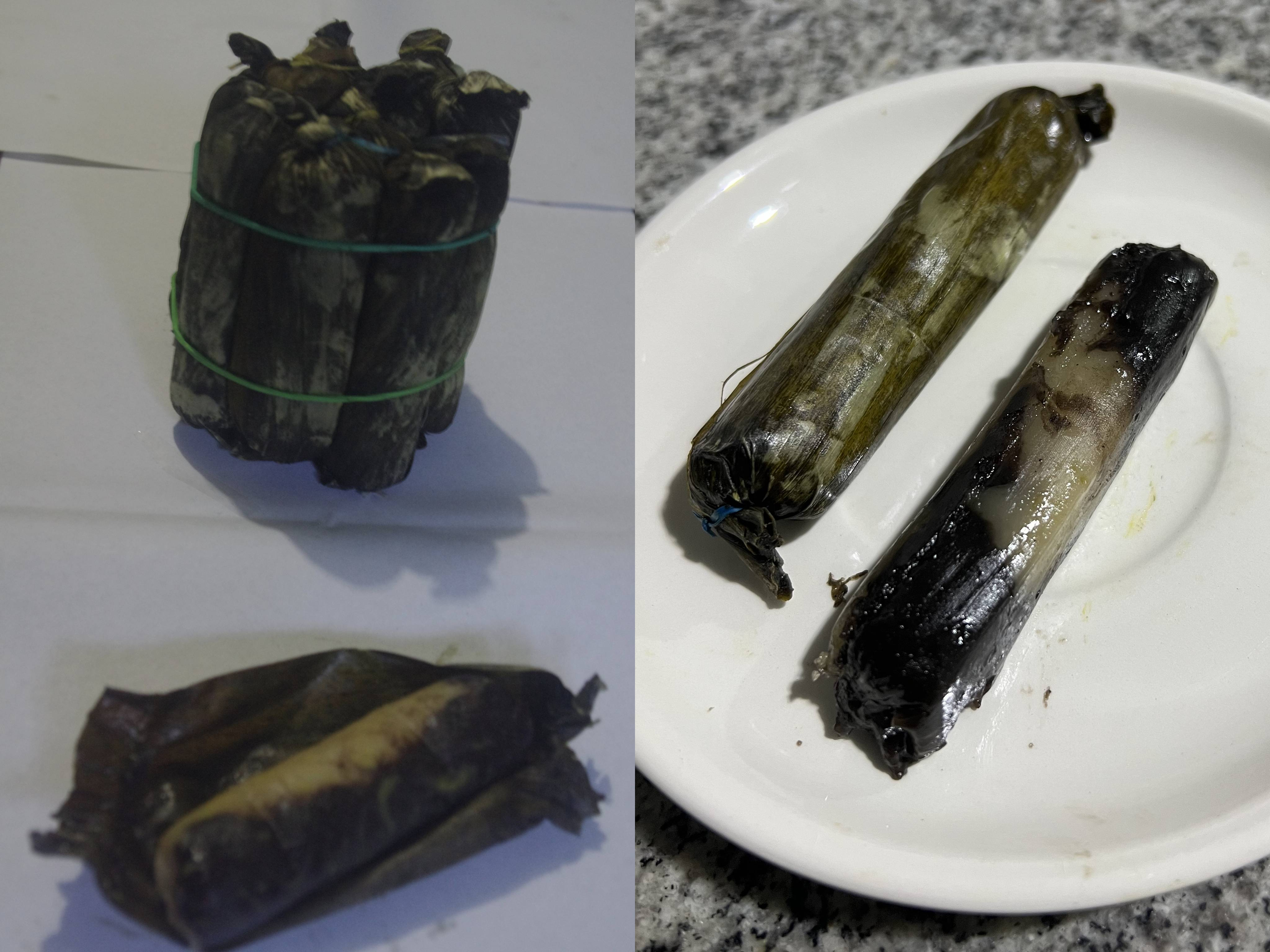
- Chocolate morón. Left: a bundle of wrapped ones on top and a single partially-unwrapped one on the bottom. Right: two on a plate, the top-left one wrapped and the bottom-right one unwrapped.
- Alternative names: Murón, chocolate morón, chocolate suman, chocolate rice cake
- Type: Rice cake
- Course: Dessert
- Place of origin: The Philippines
- Region or state: Eastern Visayas
- Main ingredients: Glutinous rice, coconut milk, sugar, chocolate
- Similar dishes: Suman

In Filipino cuisine, morón (also spelled murón, with the stress placed on the last syllable) is a rice cake similar to suman. It is a delicacy native to the Waray people of the Eastern Visayas region of the Philippines, particularly in the area around Tacloban City in the province of Leyte and in the Eastern Samar province. Other parts of the Philippines have their versions of it, however. In fact, the morón was adopted as one of Mambajao, Camiguin's locally produced products. Since it is a variety of suman, the morón is cooked with glutinous rice, coconut milk and sugar. The main difference is that morón is gyrated with chocolate tablea (chocolate tablets) or mixed with cocoa powder while a regular suman is not. It also has a hint of vanilla and is usually partnered with coffee or sikwate (tsokolate, a native Philippine chocolate drink). With chocolate as its distinct ingredient, it is also called chocolate morón or chocolate suman.

== Preparation ==
The common ingredients of morón consist of glutinous rice (locally known in Tagalog as malagkit and in the Eastern Visayas region as pilít), ordinary rice, coconut milk, sugar, chocolate or cocoa powder and melted butter. In preparation for cooking the malagkit and the ordinary rice, both rice types must be soaked together overnight and then ground the following day. The ground rice is then soaked in coconut milk until it is soft, after which sugar and chocolate powder are added. The mixture is cooked over low fire while repeatedly stirred. When the consistency is thick, the cooked mixture is set aside for it to cool.

After the mixture cools, banana leaves are prepared and cut to be used as wrappers. The recommended amount is two tablespoons of the mixture per banana leaf. The morón is then brushed with butter. After wrapping, both ends of the banana leaf are tied with string. Lastly, the morón are steamed for about half an hour. After the morón is cooled, it can now be served.

== Consumption ==
Morón is usually sold in bundles of four pieces that are individually wrapped in a banana leaf. Tourists from Leyte usually buy morón as a pasalubong or gift for their relatives and friends. In the places where morón originated, it is usually served at festivals, birthday parties, and funeral wakes. Visitors from those parties usually take home some of the morón. The food is also a medium of exchange for goodwill in Tacloban and the nearby municipalities of Palo, Tanauan, Tolosa, Dulag, Mayorga and Abuyog.

Philippine government agencies usually promote and support locally produced goods such as the morón. The Department of Science and Technology of the Philippines advocated the longer shelf life of food products including the morón to help producers of those kind of food products while the Department of Trade and Industry of the Philippines conducted trade fairs to develop and promote products, which included the morón. The Department of Labor and Employment of the Philippines, meanwhile, made a project in Mambujao, Camiguin for the production of morón.

== See also ==
- Binagol
