= Suman (food) =

Rice cake originating in the Philippines

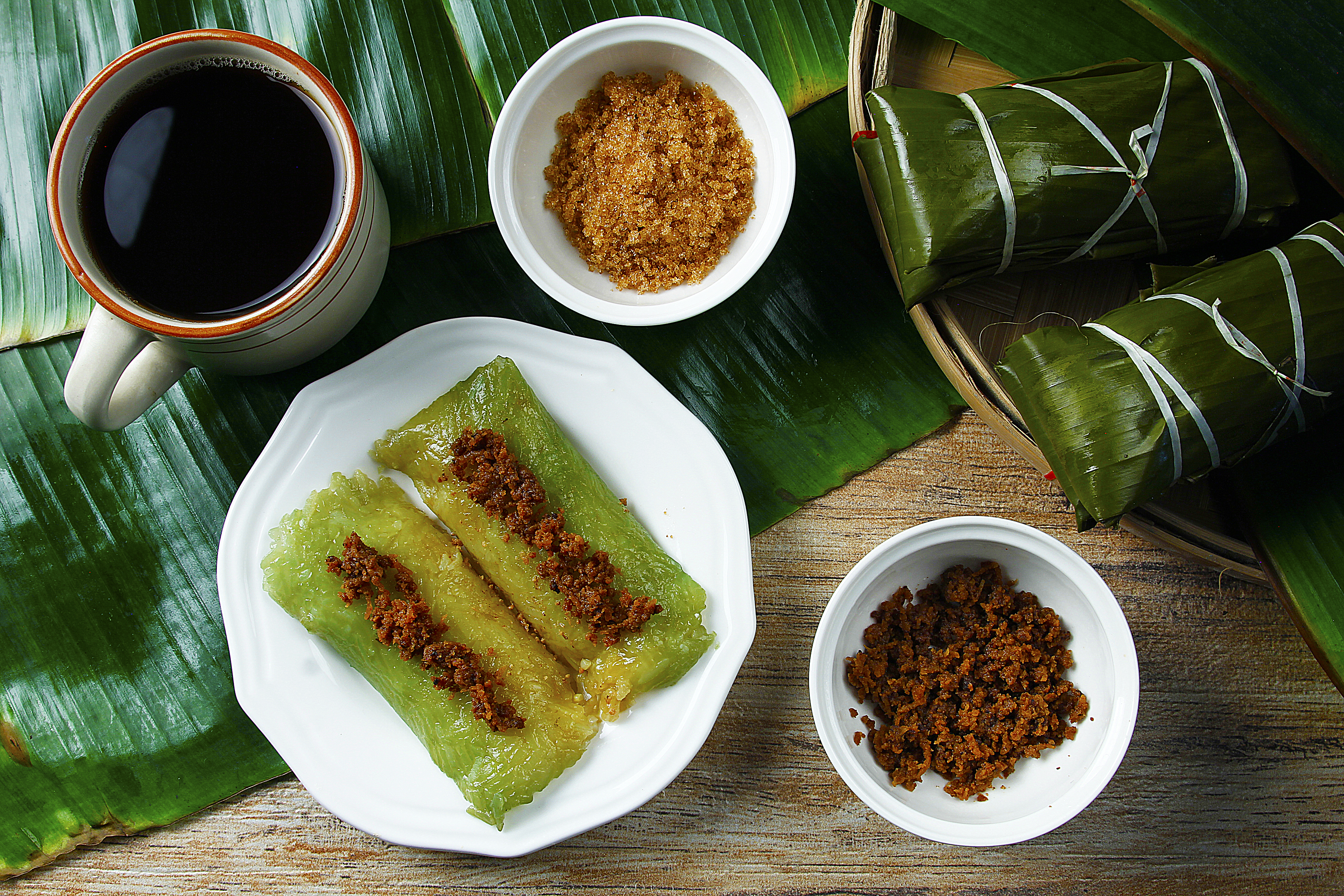
- Suman sa lihiya, a variety of suman wrapped in banana leaves
- Alternative names: Rice cake
- Place of origin: The Philippines
- Main ingredients: Glutinous rice

Suman, or budbud, is an elongated rice cake originating in the Philippines. It is made from glutinous rice cooked in coconut milk, often wrapped in banana leaves, coconut leaves, or buli or buri palm (Corypha) leaves for steaming. It is usually eaten sprinkled with sugar or laden with latik. A widespread variant of suman uses cassava instead of glutinous rice.

== Varieties ==
There are numerous varieties of suman, with almost every town or locality having its speciality. Some are:

- Binakle - Originating from the Province of Ifugao, wrapped with banana or rattan leaves, with some variants including sesame seeds or sweet potatoes as an ingredient.
- Binuo (or Suman sa Binuo) – A rare variety of suman, the glutinous rice is soaked, milled, mixed with coconut milk and sugar, wrapped in the leaves of the Tagbak plant, and steamed. The leaves give this variety of suman a uniquely balmy, minty flavor, and the suman itself is chewier than the whole-rice varieties.
- Kurukod or kurukud – A type of cassava suman with a filling of sweetened grated coconut (bukayo)
- Moron (or chocolate suman) – A suman essentially made from two sumans that are intertwined together to form a single larger suman with a candy cane like appearance. Each of the two suman constituents are made with glutinous rice flour and sometimes blended with regular rice flour, but one suman constituent is mixed with chocolate tablea (tablets) or mixed with cocoa powder while the other is largely left plain. It hails from Eastern Visayas among the Waray people especially around Tacloban City in the province of Leyte. Suman Nilambiran (or Tinambiran) is a similar looking suman dish also hailing from Eastern Visayas especially Leyte, but the two suman constituents are often made with glutinous rice whole grains (no glutinous rice flour is involved), and one constituent is made from plain white glutinous rice while the other is made from a colored (such as brown or purple) glutinous rice or chocolate-infused glutinous rice mixture.
- Palagsing – A local variety of suman from Butuan using unaw starch, or sago from the Lumbia palm tree (Metroxylon sagu)(or true sago palm), and often with pieces of coconut; it bears a characteristically red color and has a sweeter taste. This dish is known as Suman Ukaw (and also as Ambulong Suman or Amboeong Suman) in Aklan. It is known as Arasip in Leyte.
- Suman Landang – Made using Landang, a processed starch from the Buri (or Buli) palm tree (Corypha utan).
- Suman sa Ibus (or simply Ibus) – An ubiquitous variety of suman in the Philippines, the glutinous rice is washed, and is then mixed with salt and coconut milk. The mixture is poured over pre-made coil containers of young palm leaves called Ibus or Ibos, and fixed with the leaf's central shaft. That is then steamed using water mixed with "luyang dilaw" (turmeric)—giving it a distinctly yellow colour—and served either with a mixture of shredded coconut and sugar, or latik (reduce coconut milk until white lumps form and simmer until golden brown).
- Sumang Inantala – The ingredients are similar to the Ibus variety, but the Inantala differs in that the mixture itself is cooked, and then poured over a small square mat cut from banana leaves.
- Sumang Kamoteng Kahoy – Cassava is finely ground, mixed with coconut milk, sugar, wrapped in banana leaves, and steamed.
- Suman sa Lihiya – Soaked glutinous rice mixed with coconut milk is treated with lye, wrapped in banana leaves, and boiled for two hours. It is served especially with either of two varieties of latik—the brown one which has been darkened with extended cooking and has a stronger coconut flavor, or the white one which is more delicate in taste. Also known as Akap-akap from the way it is bundled and sold; it is usually sold in pairs, hence the name.
- Sumang Inilonggo – Refers to Biko in Hiligaynon/Ilonggo as opposed to the traditional suman
- Suman Dagusdos – Made with finely milled or ground glutinous rice instead of whole grains it makes for a smooth, fine, and soft texture, and hails from Aklan. Suman Maruecos from Bulacan is made with glutinous rice flour and regular rice flour, and is often flavored with ube flavoring and a filling or topping of latik, and sometimes coconut meat is added. Suman Binalay from Isabela is also made with glutinous rice flour but topped with a thick coconut caramel sauce (called laro) and latik.
- Suman Pinipig – Made from toasted young glutinous rice flakes (pinipig), coconut milk, and sugar.
- Sayongsong – Made with equal portions of regular rice and glutinous rice. A native deep purple glutinous rice called pirurotong is traditionally used giving it a strong blue to purple color, but other glutinous rice can be used. The Surigao version adds roasted peanuts, but in the Visayas grated young coconuts are used. A bit of calamansi juice is also added.
- Tupig – It has a long and thin shaped appearance and is cooked over charcoal to give it a smoky aroma and chewy texture. It is made of glutinous rice flour that has been soaked and lightly fermented, and mixed with muscovado sugar or molasses, and young coconut meat strips. It originates from the Ilocos Region.
- Sumang Gabi – Made with gabi (tarot) instead of rice. It is popular in the Bicol Region, various provinces of Southern Luzon, and Leyte.
- Budbud Kabog – Made with kabog millet (Panicum miliaceum) instead of rice. A delicacy from Cebu and originating from Catmon.
- Budbud Dawa – Made with dawa (Foxtail millet) instead of rice. A delicacy from Cebu and originating from Catmon.
- Bikayi – Made with grated cassava and bits of grated young corn kernels instead of rice, and wrapped in banana leaves but sometimes in corn husk. It hails from the Maranao people.
- Dinumugan – Made with saba bananas or cardava bananas, glutinous rice flour, grated coconuts, and coconut cream. It hails from Bohol. It is also called Suman na Saging.
- Suman Camote (or Suman Kamote) – Made with sweet potatoes, glutinous rice flour, coconut cream/milk. It's most popular in the Bicol Region, Eastern Visayas, and the Southern Tagalog areas.

== Suman wrapping ==
Suman wrapping is a unique art in itself, and can be traced to pre-colonial roots. Wrappers utilize a wide variety of indigenous materials such as palm, banana, anahaw and bamboo leaves, coconut shells, and others. Some wrappings are simple folds such as those found in the binuo and the kamoteng kahoy, resulting in rectangular suman. Others are in vertical coils like the inantala, giving it a tubular form. Still others are in pyramid-like shapes, like the balisungsong. Some forms of suman are eaten like ice cream–with cones made from banana leaves, and still others are in very complex geometric patterns like the pusu ("heart"). Some are woven into the shape of a banana blossom (which in the Philippines is referred to as the banana plant's "heart"), or the pinagi (from the word pagi, meaning stingray), a complex octahedral star.

Suman dishes (as well as savory variants like binalot and pastil) are differentiated from pusô (or patupat), in that the latter use woven palm leaves.

== Gallery ==
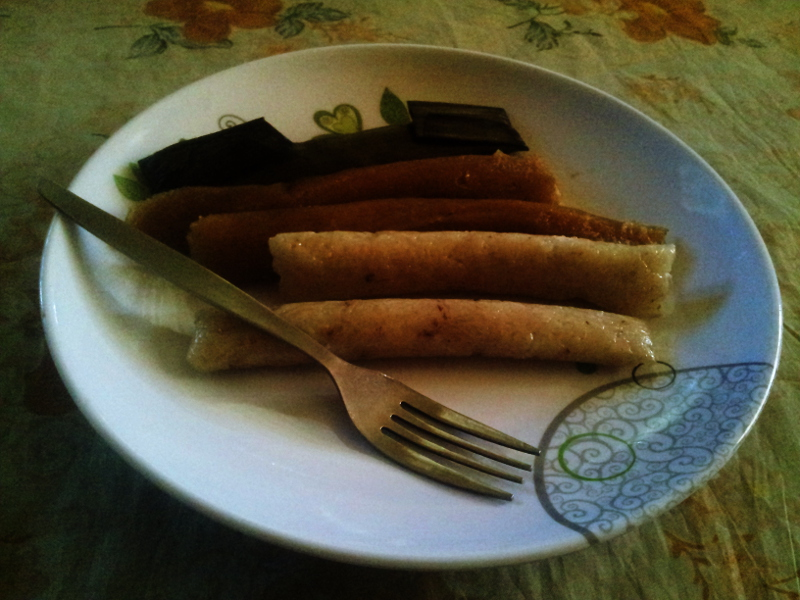
Two varieties of suman (glutinous rice and cassava)

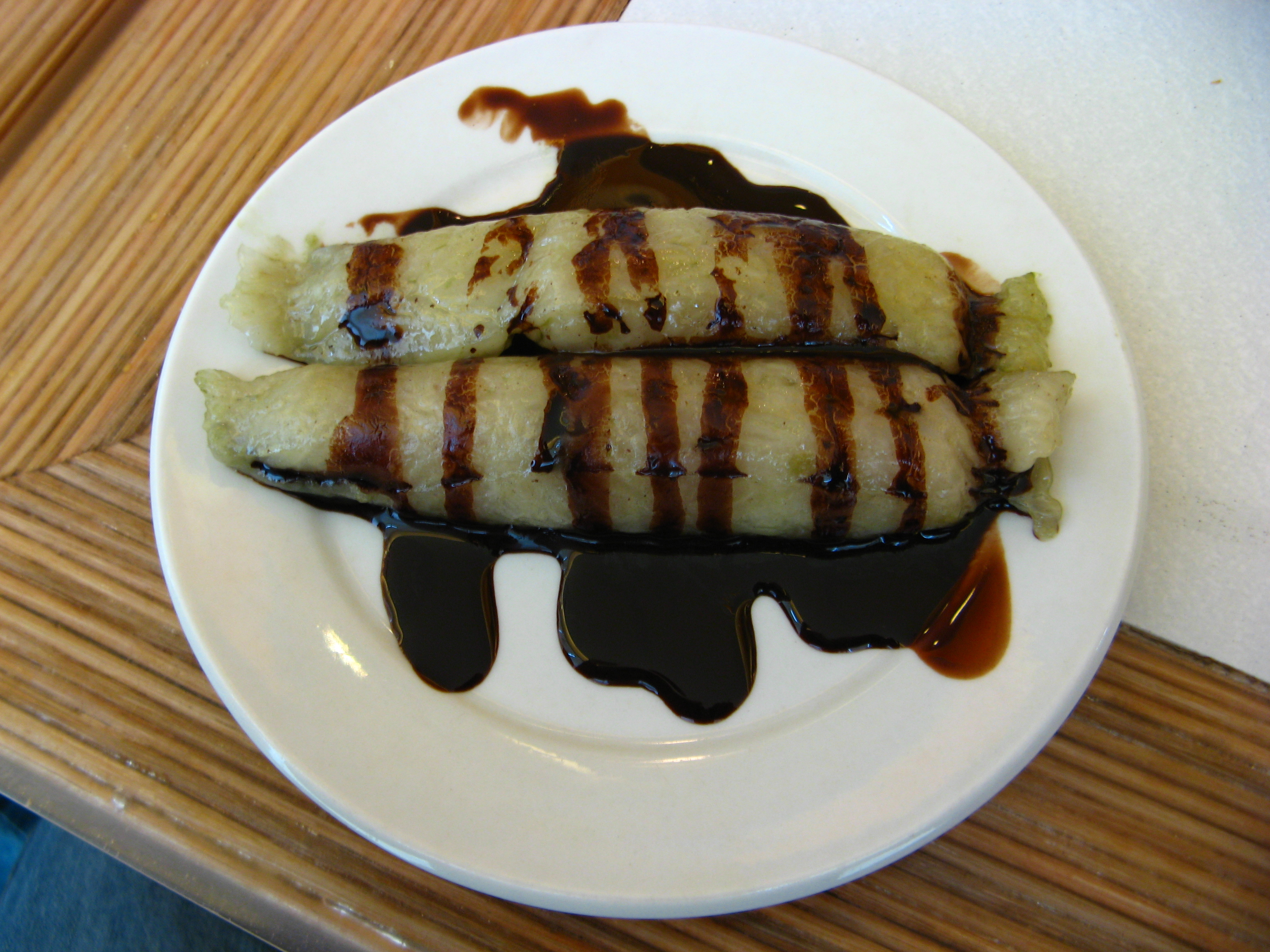
Sumang kamoteng kahoy (Cassava suman) smothered in latík

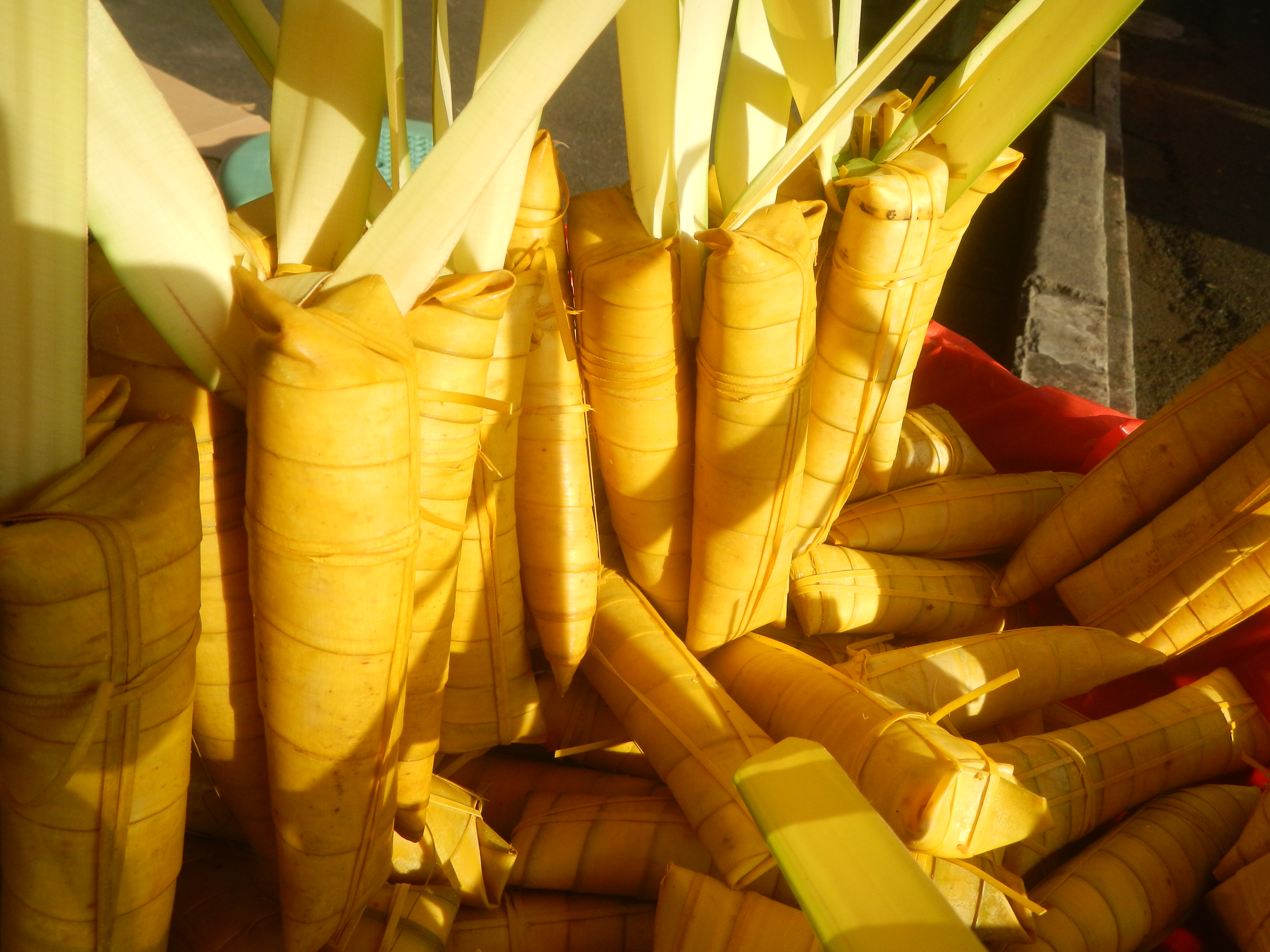
Suman sa ibus

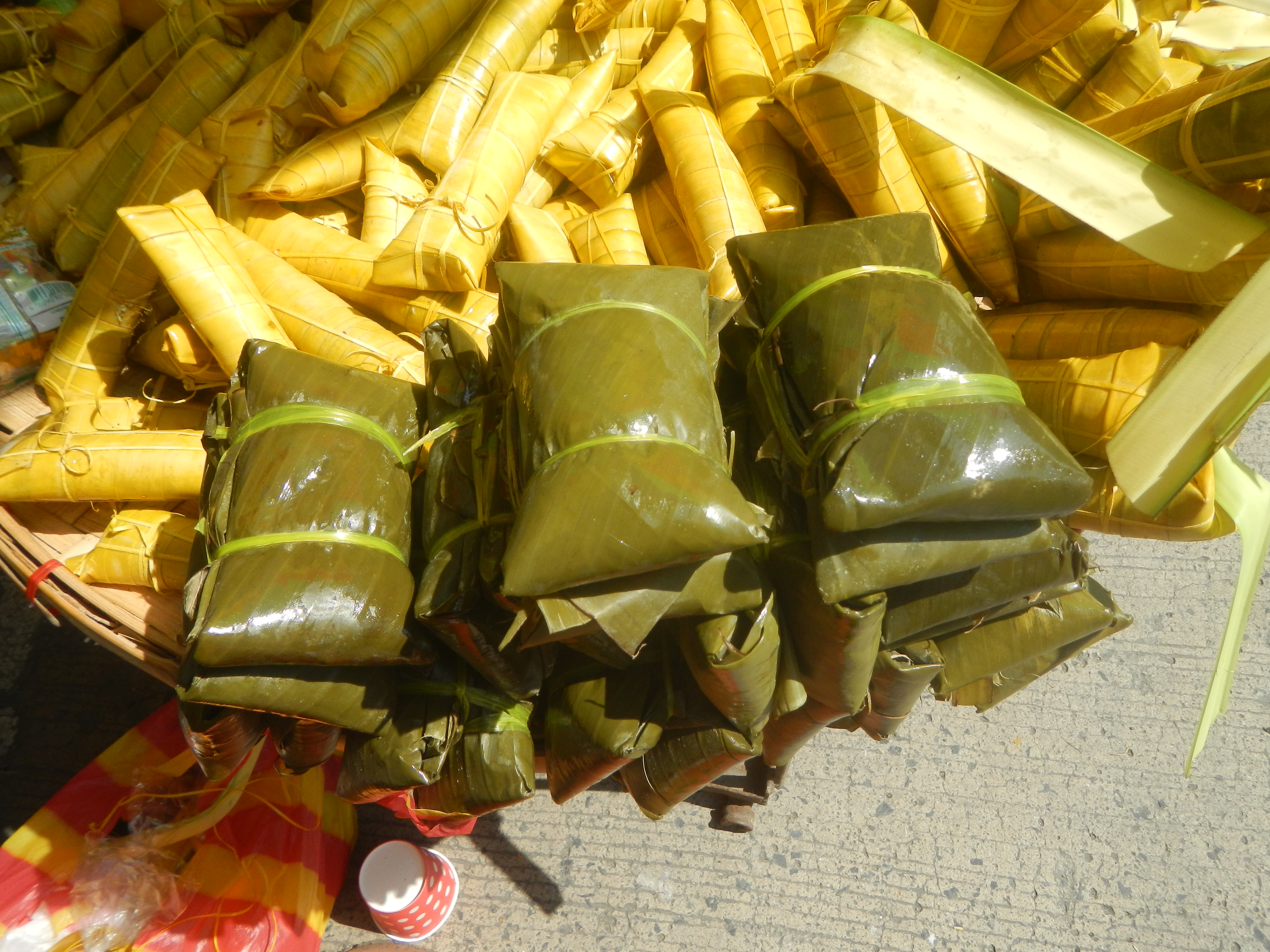
Suman sa lihiya

== See also ==
- Espasol
- Kakanin
- Kalamay
- Khao tom
- Lepet
- Moron
- Piutu
- Pusô
- Puto
- Sapin-sapin
- Tupig
- List of steamed foods
