= Pastil =

Filipino packed rice dish

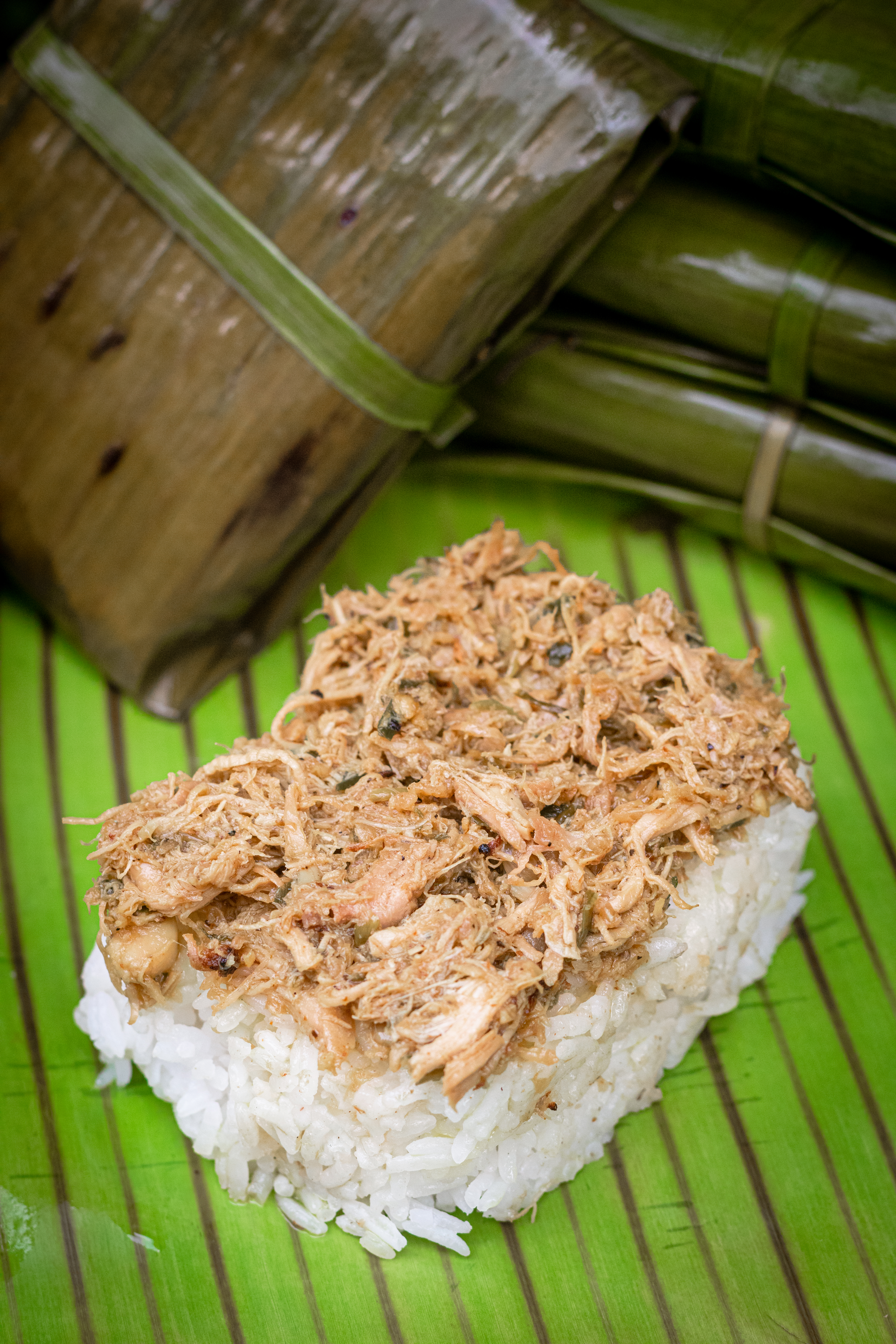
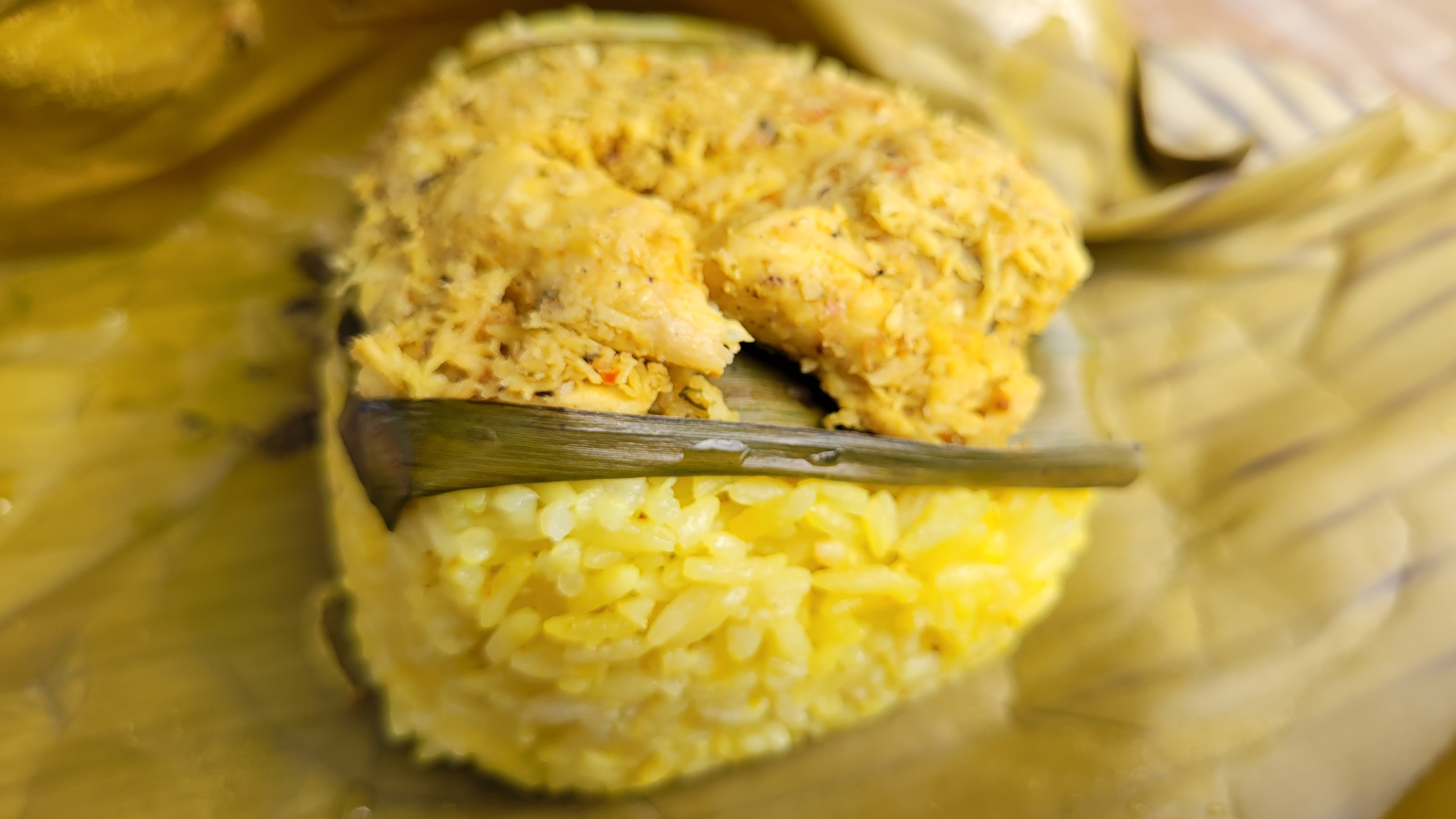
- Top: Maguindanaon chicken pastil; Bottom: Maranao chicken pater with kuning (turmeric rice) and palapa
- Alternative names: pastel, patil, patel, patir, pater, paster
- Course: Main dish
- Place of origin: Philippines
- Region or state: Maguindanao
- Main ingredients: white rice, glutinous rice, shredded beef/chicken/fish
- Similar dishes: binalot, piyoso & nasi dagang

Pastil is a Filipino dish made with steamed rice wrapped in banana leaves with dry shredded chicken or fish. It originates from the Maguindanao people and is a popular, cheap breakfast meal in Mindanao, especially among Muslim Filipinos. Pastil is also known as patil, patel, patir, or pater in Maranao; and paster in Iranun.

== Description ==
The meat or fish component of the dish is known as the kagikit. It is usually shredded chicken. The meat is cooked similarly to adobo (but without the vinegar). It is boiled and then shredded. Garlic and onions are sautéed in a pan and the shredded meat is added. Soy sauce (or oyster sauce), black pepper, and salt to taste are added and allowed to simmer until they evaporate. Palapa or chili pastes are also traditionally added since Muslim Filipino dishes are almost always spicy. Shredded grilled fish can also be used; usually katipa (walking catfish) or dalag (common snakehead) mixed with coconut meat.

The white rice is mixed with a little glutinous rice, steamed, placed on oiled banana leaves and wrapped as a thick cylinder with a strip of the meat filling extending along the length of the rice or covering one side of the rice. The leaf is then wrapped around the mixture with the ends tucked inside. The Maranao version of the dish, pater, is usually made with turmeric-infused rice (kuning) which gives it a bright yellow color. Pastil is halal food, and thus pork is never used.

Pastil is traditionally served with vegetables soaked in vinegar as a side dish, like cucumber or togue (mung bean sprouts), to neutralize the saltiness of the kagikit. A hard-boiled egg may also be included to complement the meal. It is usually eaten with coffee or Tsokolate (hot chocolate) for breakfast or merienda. Pastil are commonly sold by restaurants and street vendors in Muslim communities in Mindanao and throughout the islands, for example, General Santos hosts several restaurants serving this with side dishes. It is also sold as a cheap snack or breakfast in Metro Manila's Muslim areas like Maharlika Village in Taguig and Quiapo in Manila. In Lanao del Sur, Lanao del Norte, and Northern Mindanao, restaurants or food stalls that specialize in the Maranao version (pater) are called pateran.

== Similar dishes ==
Pastil is similar to northern Filipino wrapped meat dishes like binalot, but it differs by using shredded meat or fish instead of whole meat portions.

Its popularity has led to various adaptations outside Mindanao, some of which have sparked controversy. In particular, versions that package pastil in bottles or use pork—prohibited (haram) in Islam—have been criticized for cultural appropriation. Due to this, the National Commission on Muslim Filipinos launched an investigation into misleadingly labeled non-halal dishes, including "pork pastil", "palapork", "pork biryani", and "pork shawarma" in 2024.

A Bangsamoro official urged the public to avoid calling any wrapped dish made with pork "pastil" and to use alternative names instead. However, they expressed support for the broader appreciation of pastil beyond the Muslim community.

== See also ==
- Lemper
- Panyalam
- Piyoso
- Suman
- Tiyula itum
- Onigiri
