= Gelora 10 November Stadium =

Football stadium in Indonesia

- Stadion Gelora 10 November
- G10 November Stadium
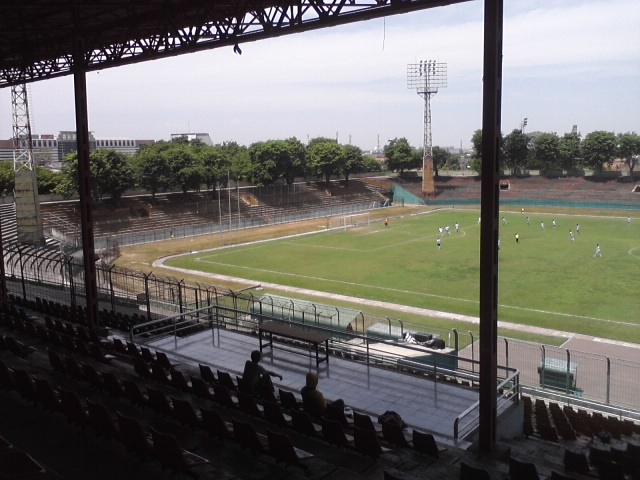
- Gelora 10 November Stadium

- Location in Surabaya, Java, and Indonesia Gelora 10 November Stadium (Java) Gelora 10 November Stadium (Indonesia)
- Former names: Tambaksari Field (until 1954); Tambaksari Stadium (1954–1969)
- Location: Tambaksari, Surabaya, East Java, Indonesia
- Coordinates: 7°15′06″S 112°45′22″E
- Owner: Government of Surabaya
- Capacity: 20,000
- Surface: grass
- Public transit: Surabaya Gubeng; Surabaya Kota

Construction
- Opened: Between 1907 and 1923 (Field); 11 September 1954
- Renovated: 1951–1954, 1969, 2018
- Architect: Tan Giok Tjiauw (stadium)

Tenants
- Persebaya Surabaya (1952–2010); NIAC Mitra (1979–1990) de Red (2026–)

Gelora 10 November Stadium (Indonesian: Stadion Gelora 10 November, lit. '10 November Sports Arena Stadium'), formerly known as Tambaksari Stadium (Stadion Tambaksari), is a football stadium located in Tambaksari, Surabaya, East Java, Indonesia. It is currently used mostly for association football matches. Originally a football field named Tambaksari Field (Lapangan Tambaksari), the stadium holds 20,000 people. The stadium is widely known to has Pterocarpus indicus trees inside. The current name derives from the starting date of Battle of Surabaya, which later become the Indonesian Heroes' Day.

== History ==
In August 2026, the stadium was chosen as the home base of de Red for the 2026–27 Championship season.

== Major events ==
- 26 August – 6 September 1969: 7th Indonesian National Games (Pekan Olahraga Nasional)
- 16 June 1983: Post-season tour match of Arsenal, when they were beaten 2–0 by local club NIAC Mitra.
- 11 July 1992: Sepultura's Arise World Tour
- 28 June – 6 July 2012: 4th ASEAN School Games
