= Tambaksari =

- District
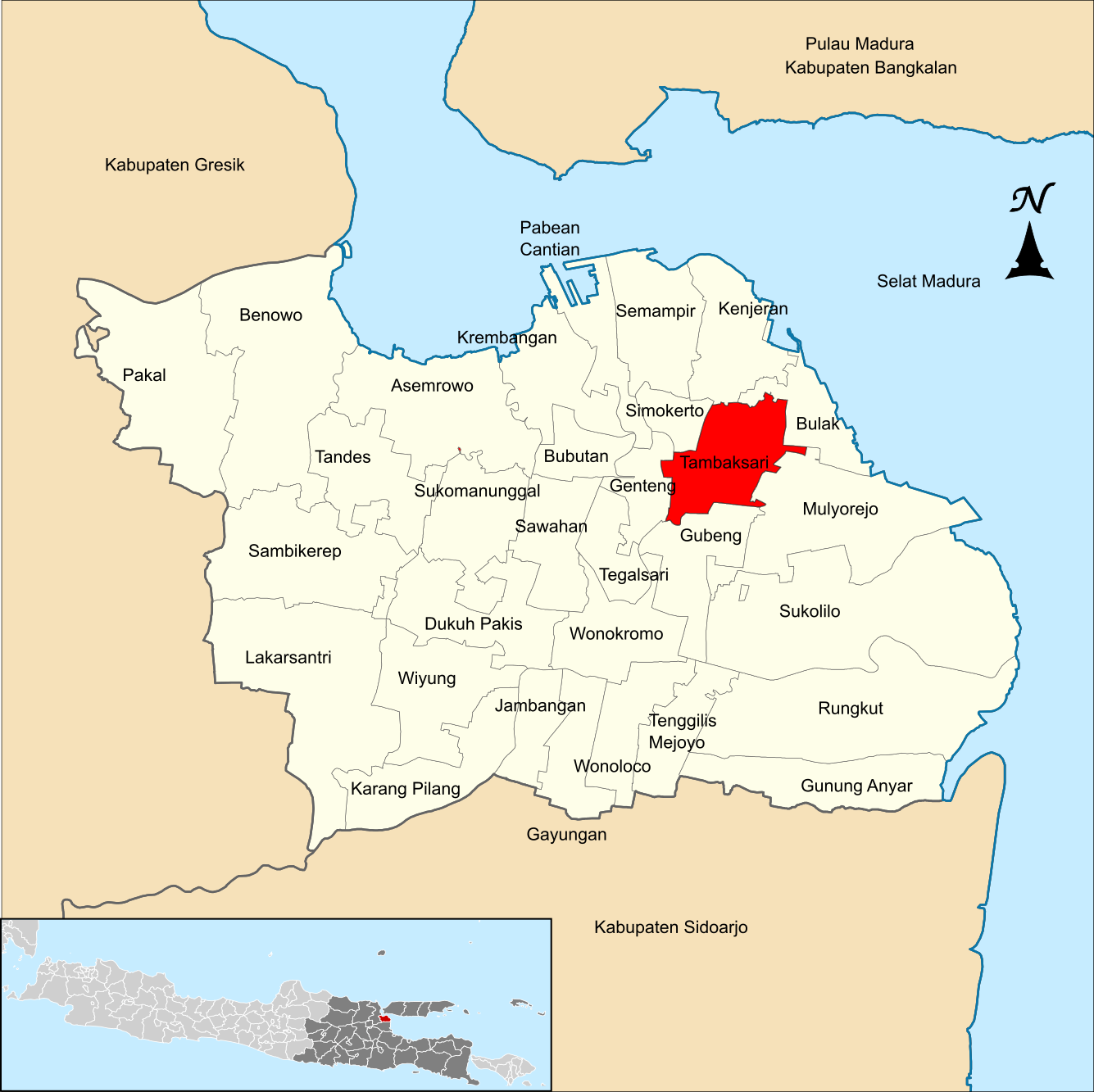
- Country: Indonesia
- Province: East Java
- City: Surabaya

Area
  - Total: 8.97 km^{2} (3.46 sq mi)

Population (mid 2024 estimate)
  - Total: 227,025
  - Density: 25,300/km^{2} (65,600/sq mi)
- Time zone: UTC+7
- Website: https://tambaksari.kec-kuwarasan.kebumenkab.go.id/

Tambaksari is an administrative district (kecamatan) in the city of Surabaya in East Java, Indonesia

== History ==
Tambaksari Village can be said to be an old village in Surabaya. Initially, Tambaksari village was a pond or swamp, but in the 19th century it was already inhabited by people and it started to become busy in the 1960s.
