= Casabe =

Cassava flatbread

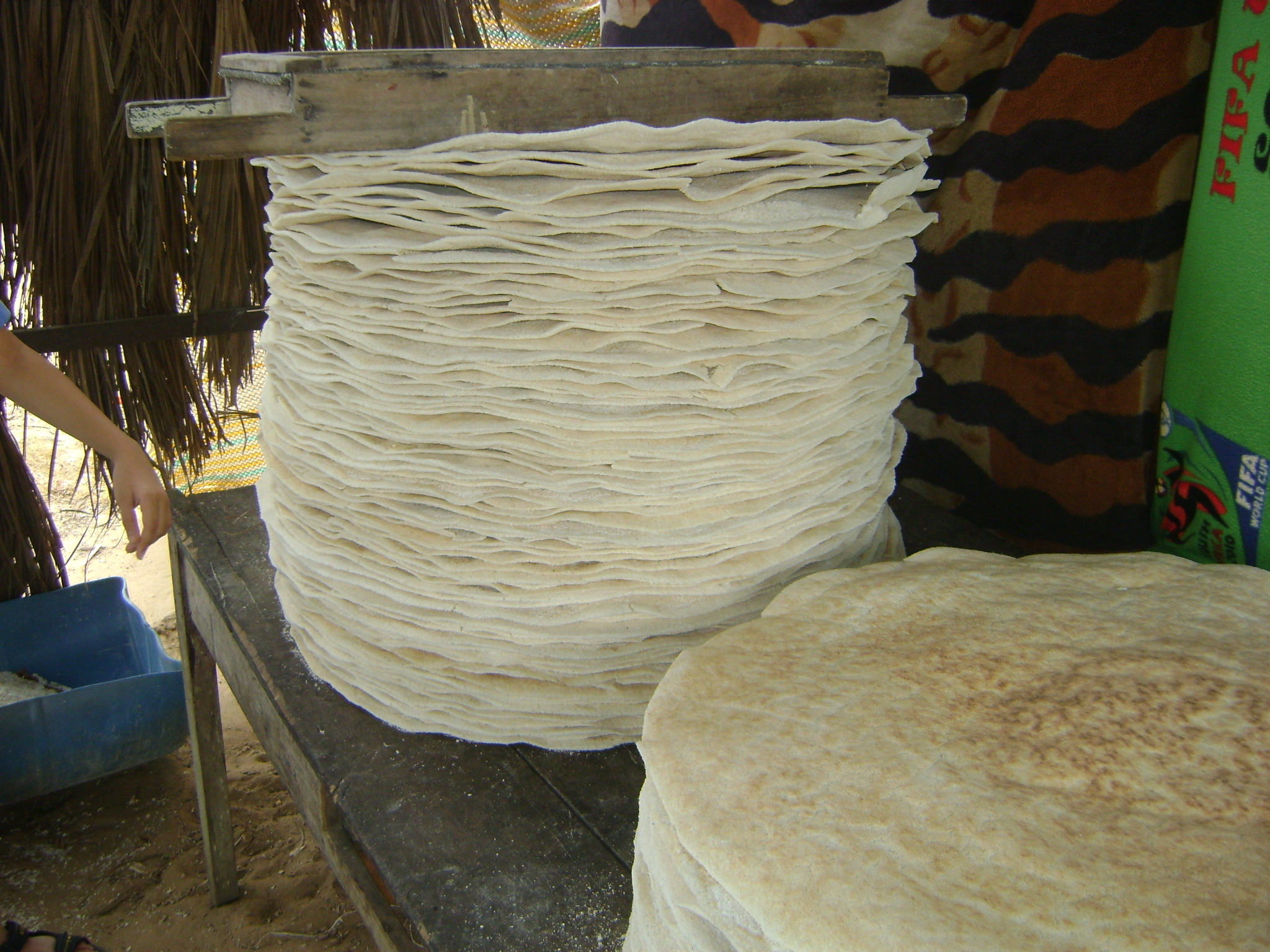
- A stack of casabe
- Alternative names: Cassava bread, kasav, ereba, beiju
- Type: Flatbread
- Place of origin: Caribbean South America
- Associated cuisine: Amazon, Venezuela, Suriname, Caribbean (including Cuba and Dominican Republic)

Casabe or cassava bread is a flatbread made of cassava, eaten across the Caribbean Basin and the Amazon. It is usually made of bitter cassava, which is toxic before processing. Some cultures use mashed, fermented cassava, while others use cassava starch (tapioca), and additional ingredients may be used for flavor. The flatbread bakes for a few minutes on a flat surface known as a budare. Casabe is thin and crispy. When dried, it lasts several months. It may be eaten with various dishes or sweets. It is high in fiber and does not contain fat or gluten.

Casabe may have originated in Caribbean South America thousands of years ago before spreading to the Antilles. It was eaten by the Taíno and other Pre-Columbian cultures, being useful for its portability. Spanish colonists encountered casabe in the 1490s and also considered it useful, despite disliking its taste. European explorers, soldiers, and buccaneers adopted casabe in the sixteenth century, and it was produced and traded at large scales. However, its consumption was limited to a small region, and Europeans preferred wheat bread. After a decline in popularity, casabe has seen a revival since the 1990s, in part due to its health value. Casabe was recognized as UNESCO Intangible Cultural Heritage in a multinational listing inscribed in 2024.

Casabe is consumed by many indigenous peoples of South America and is a staple food for some groups in the Amazon. It is common in Venezuelan cuisine, particularly in the eastern region and among Indigenous and Afro-Venezuelans, and has spread across the country. In Suriname, it is eaten by all ethnic groups. It has also spread across Cuba from the central and eastern regions. For the Garifuna people in Central America, casabe (known as ereba) is a culturally important dish. It is also eaten across the Dominican Republic and neighboring Haiti, as well as other parts of the Caribbean.

== Etymology ==
In the Arawakan languages, the word casabe—also spelled casabi, casavi, or cazabi—refers to a baked good made of cassava flour. The English cassava derives from this word, as a metonym extending the name of the product to the ingredient. This conflation originated among English-speaking observers such as Francis Drake, who referred to the crop as cassavia and the flatbread as cassado. Some writers adopted the term cassado, while others used cassava to refer to the flatbread, before the usage of cassava for the crop became standard. In Spanish, however, the word casabe refers only to the flatbread, as writers did not conflate it with the crop; the word entered Spanish in the 18th century.

The Portuguese term for casabe is beiju. In Haiti, it is known as kasav. The Garifuna people call it ereba. Other regional terms for the bread include cassava bread, casave, and couac. Spanish colonists used the term pan de indias (transl. Indian bread).

== Preparation ==
Casabe is a flatbread made of cassava flour, which is made by peeling, grating, squeezing, and sifting cassava. Either bitter or sweet varieties of cassava may be used for casabe. Bitter varieties are more common. Both varieties of cassava contain the compound linamarin, which produces cyanide, although the bitter variety contains much more. Bitter cassava is toxic unless it undergoes complicated processing into casabe or a porridge known as farinha. This process requires extracting the water, as cyanide is soluble in water. It may involve extracting the toxins using a sieve known as a matapi.

One kilogram of cassava yields about one-third of a kilogram of casabe. Cassava flour is mixed with water and forms a smooth dough. Optional additions include coconut, cinnamon, anise, mocambo seeds, or sweeteners such as sugar or panela. The dough is shaped into large circles with a thickness of 0.5–5 cm (0.20–1.97 in), against a hot, flat surface known as a budare. (Note: In Haiti, the bread is baked on a round iron surface known as a platine.) The budare allows the temperature to be controlled. It bakes for a few minutes, and water evaporates, resulting in a cohesive, solid flatbread.

Preparation of casabe
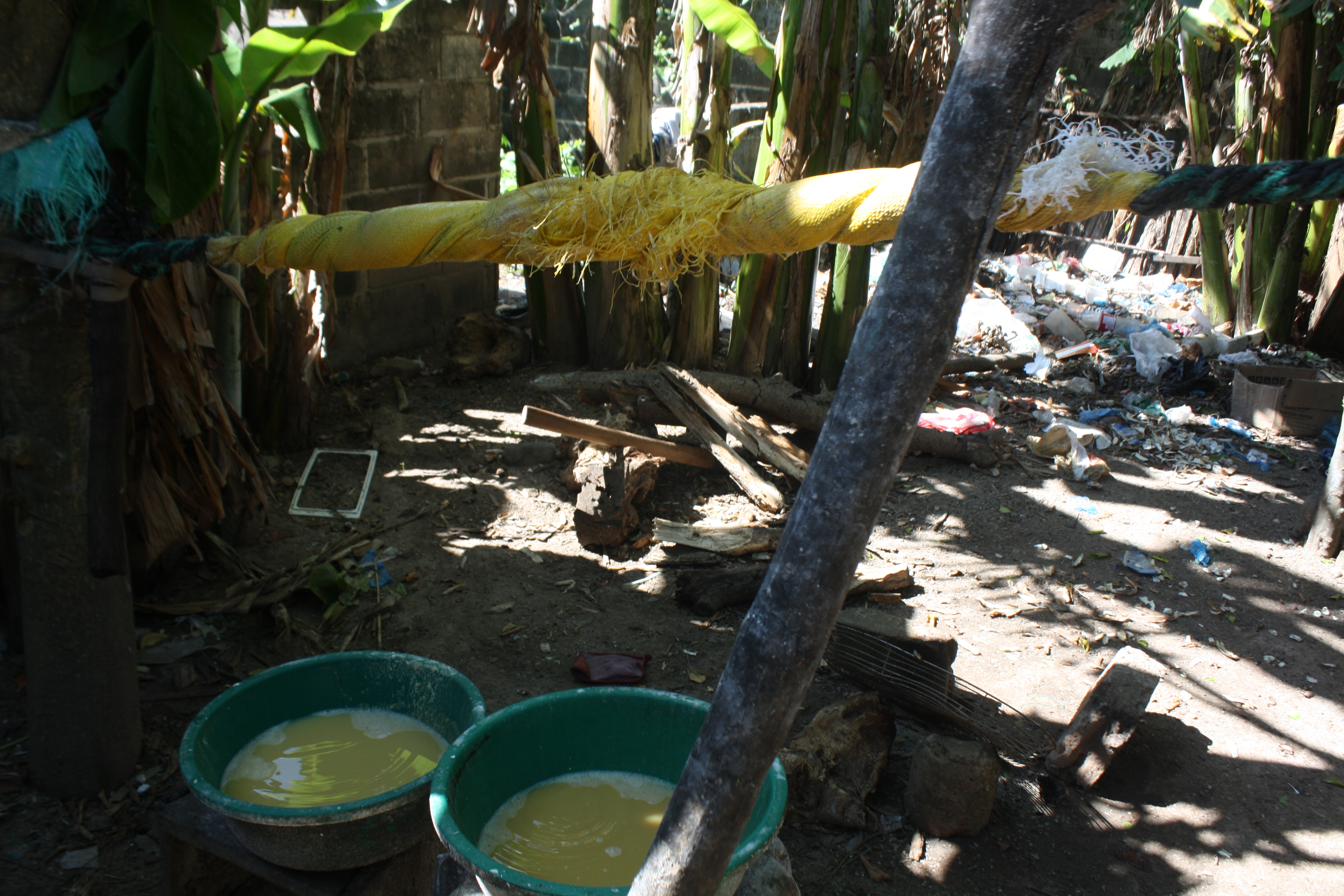
Cassava is squeezed to extract toxins.

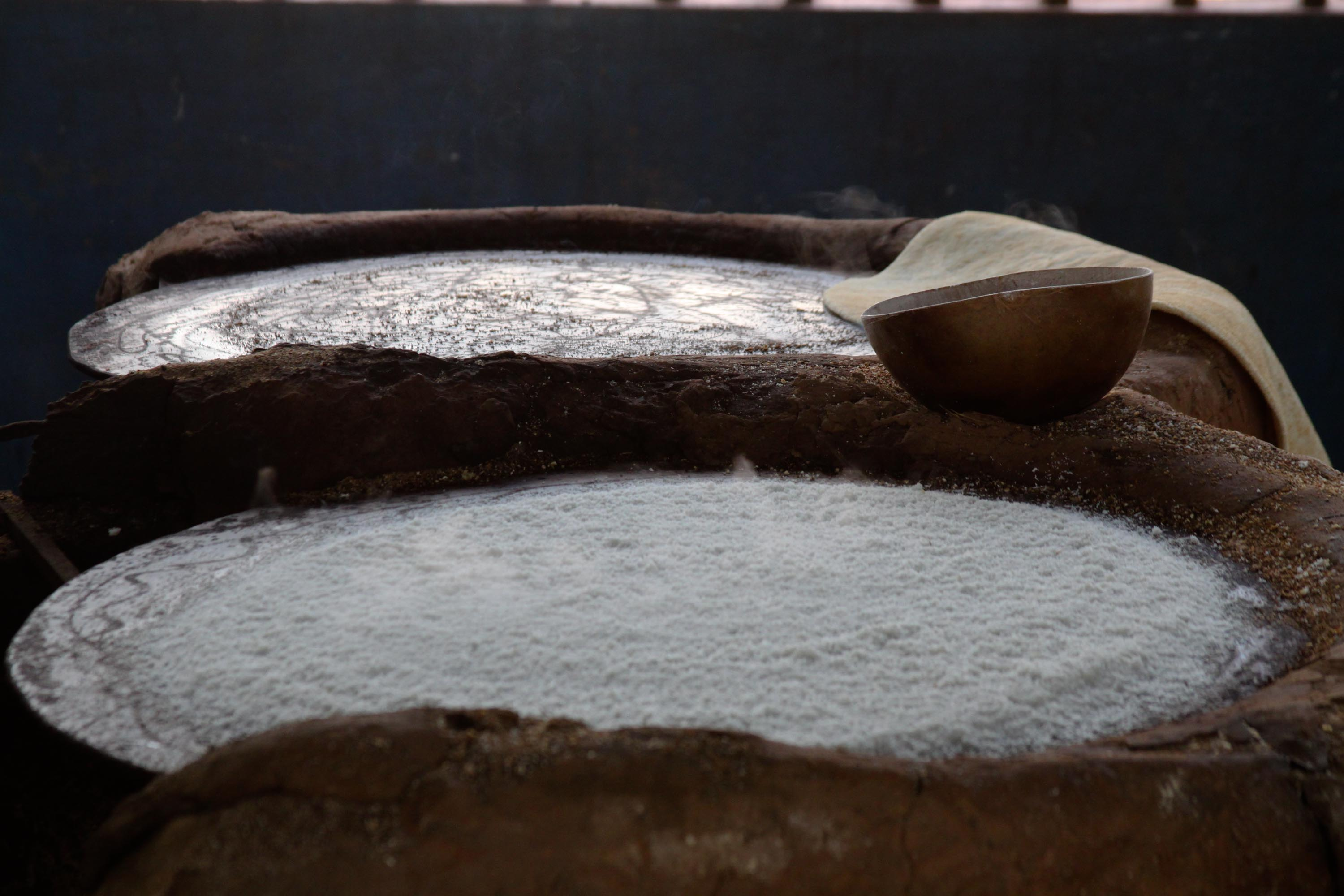
The dough is shaped into circles.

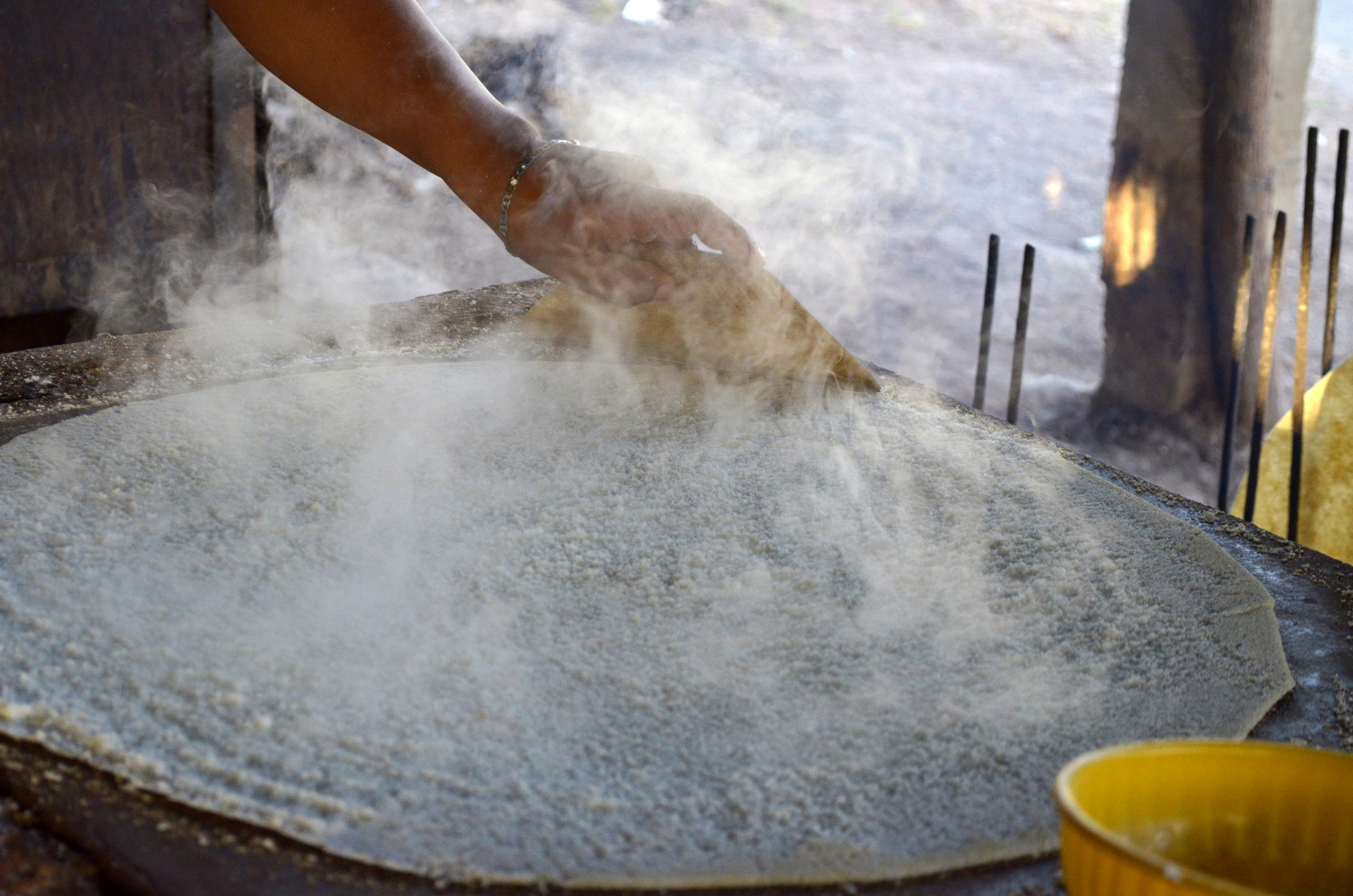
Water evaporates as casabe bakes on a budare.

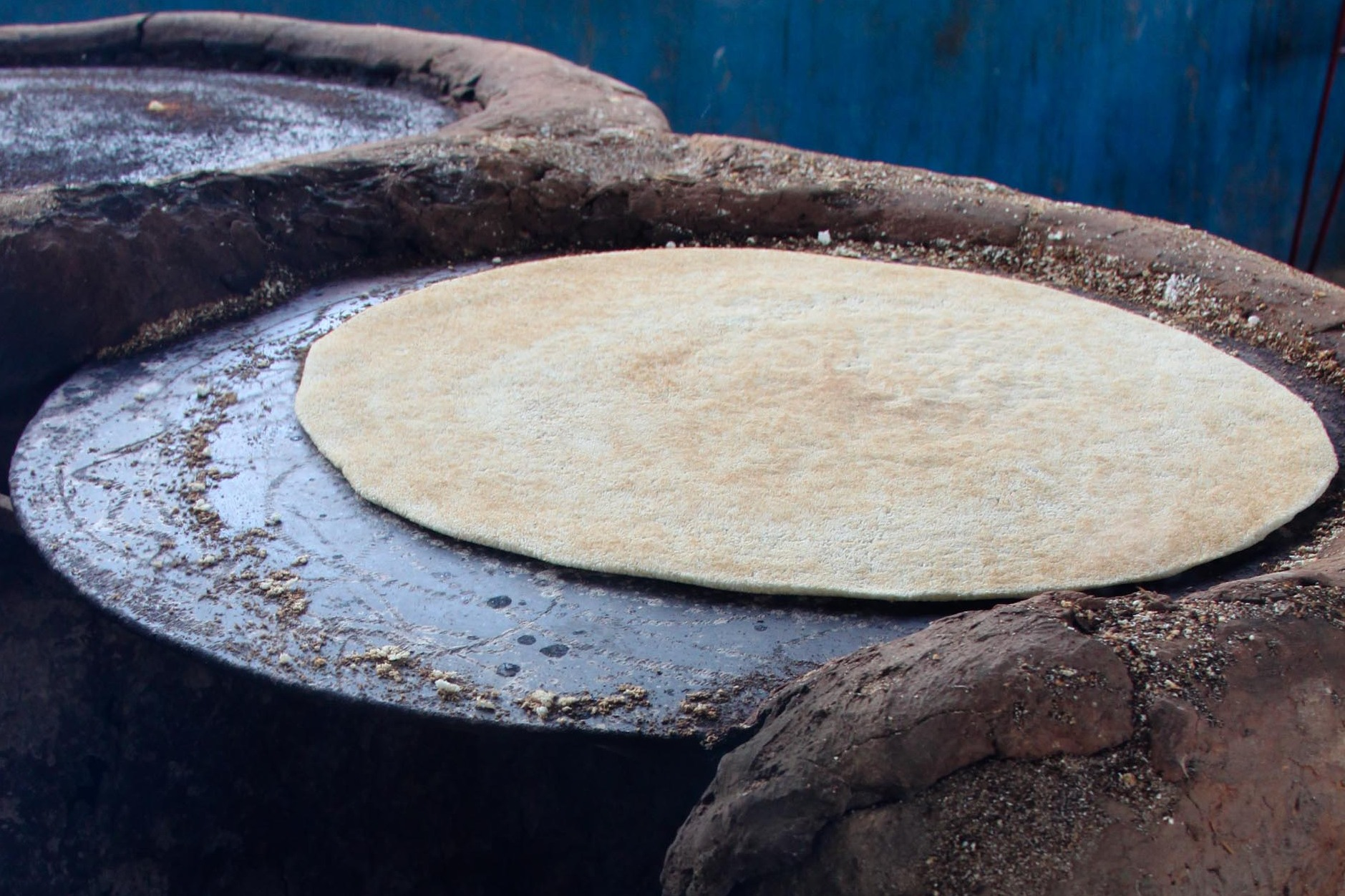
The final product is thin and dry.

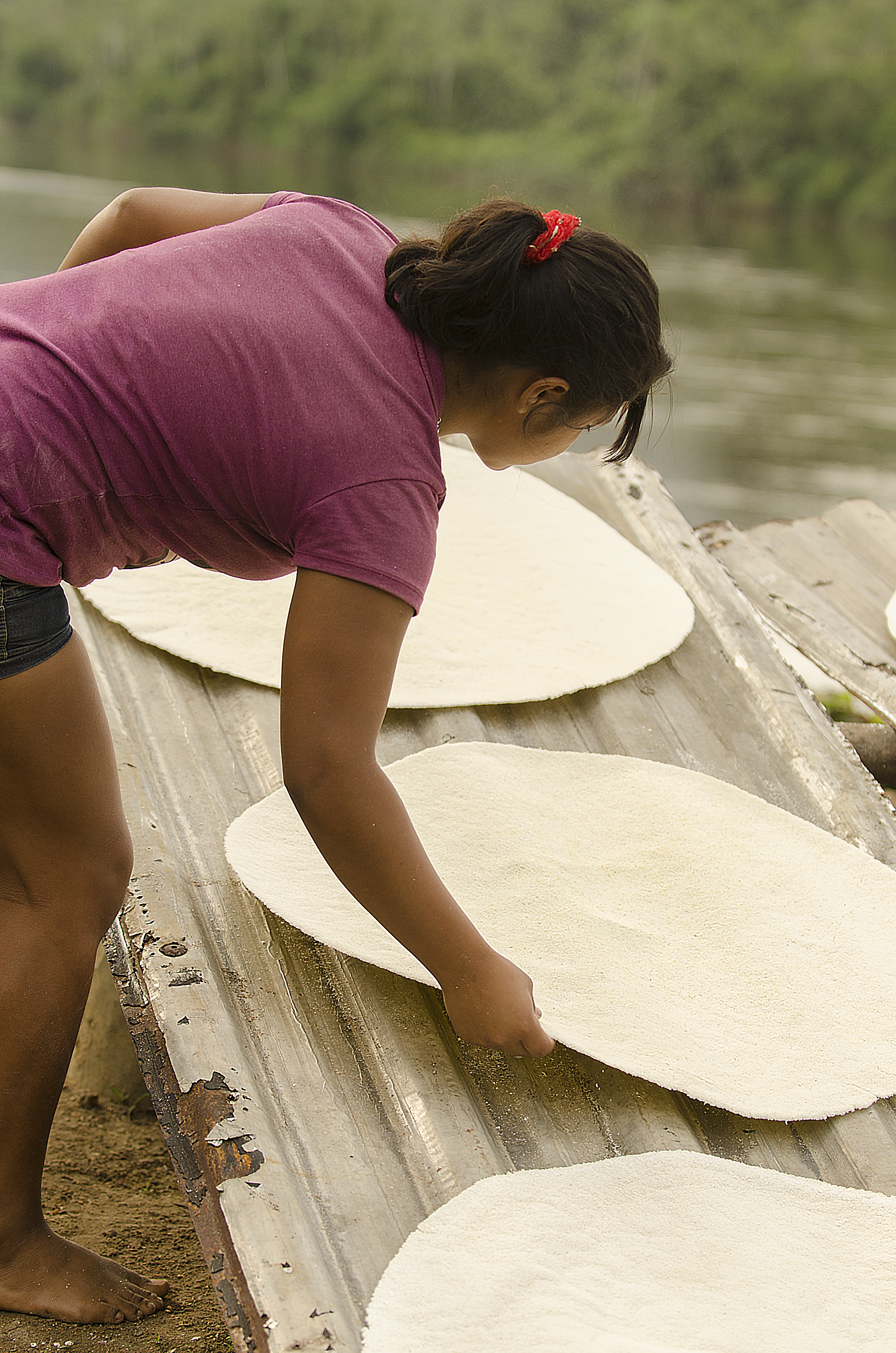
Casabe may vary in size.

Casabe is round, thin, crispy, and dry, resembling a cracker, with a mild earthy flavor. It may be white or golden brown. It is similar to the arepa, but thinner, and it is larger than a tortilla.

There are many types of casabe with differing varieties of cassava, lengths of fermentation, preparation methods, and sizes. Casabe de masa—made with mashed, fermented cassava—is eaten by some Amazonian cultures including the Witoto and Nonuya, while casabe de almidón—made with tapioca, the starch of the plant—is eaten by others including the Andoque and Muinane. Jaujau is a very thin casabe made of fine flour and, in its modern form, sweetened. Cultures such as the Tucanoan peoples do not distinguish between types of bread made of cassava, referring to all of them as casabe, though color, taste, and texture vary between producers. Some communities in the Dominican Republic add lard to casabe for flavor. Haitian kasav has distinctive flavorings added during baking, including various combinations of salt, sugar, cinnamon, coconut, ginger, condensed milk, pineapple, and herring.

== Use ==
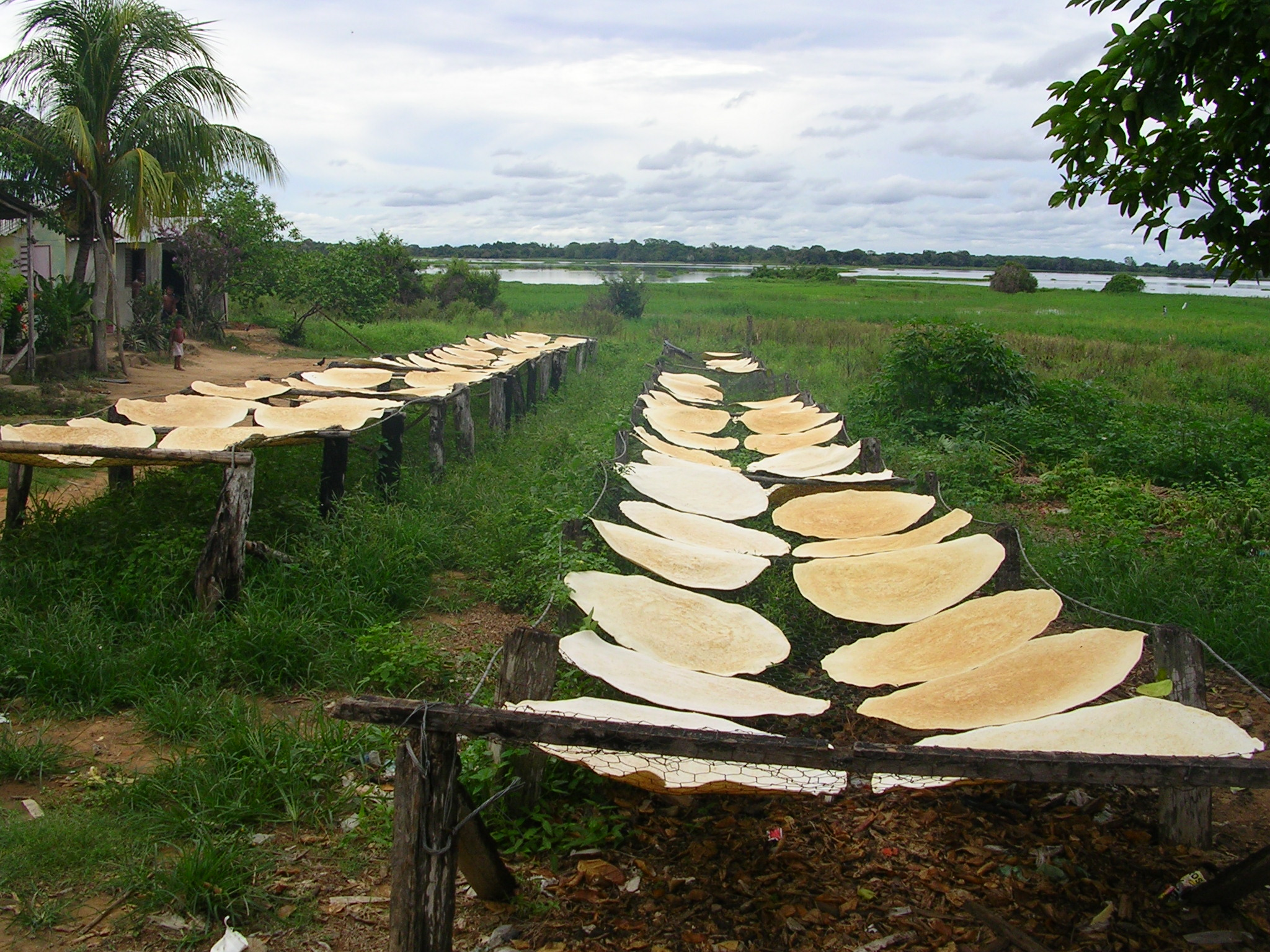
Casabe being dried

Casabe is often baked in batches, with as many as 30 flatbreads at once, enough to last one week for a household. Communities including the Ye'kuana prefer to prepare it the day it is eaten, requiring time-intensive work. Casabe can be dried to last months or years. Its softness can be restored by soaking it in liquid.

Casabe may be eaten for any meal. It may be topped with other foods used as a spoon, and it is less commonly eaten by itself. Its flavor pairs well with meat or fish, and it is also served with sweet foods such as coconut. Since it is dry, it is paired with moist foods. It is sometimes used as a spoon for pepperpot, a stew made from cassava juice. In Cuba, it is paired with eggs, vegetables, chocolate, or coffee. Casabito, eaten along the Caribbean coast of Colombia, is a sweet type of casabe folded over a filling of either coconut or mongo mongo, which is a mixture of banana, guava, and mamey. In parts of the Amazon, fariña de pescado consists of casabe mixed with dried fish.

Casabe is also the basis of the alcoholic beverage parakari, made by mixing pieces of burnt casabe with water and a fermentation starter. Casabe is also used for a similar, non-alcoholic beverage, known among the Macushi people as woʻ.

== Nutrition and physical qualities ==
A 100-gram serving of casabe contains 265 dietary calories. It has a high fiber content, ranging from 7% to 19%, differing based on the variety of cassava. It is low in protein, but it is paired with protein-rich foods such as milk or cheese. It contains vitamins including thiamin—with 62 micrograms per 100-gram serving—as well as niacin. It also contains minerals including phosphorus and calcium. However, the calcium binds with fiber, making it less bioavailable, and the calcium content of casabe is less than that of other vegetable fibers unless enzymes are added. It does not contain fat, sodium, cholesterol, or gluten. It has an estimated glycemic index of 118 and insulinemic index of 132, with both responses being similar to plain cassava. Although raw cassava contains cyanogenic toxins, the final product contains only 2 to 8 percent of the initial content.

Though properties of casabe may vary between producers, a crispy texture is typically desired. Some people instead prefer a moist texture, so they add water before eating. The preference among the Tucanoan peoples is for casabe to be thick and mildly sour, qualities achieved by using bitter cassava. Bitter cassava also results in a longer-lasting product. A hypothesis by Donald Lathrap states that bitter cassava varieties are cultivated because of their preferable qualities for products including casabe.

== History ==
=== Prehistory ===
Bitter cassava was the main staple of the Pre-Columbian Antilles, and ancient peoples developed methods to discard the toxin or utilize it for poisoned arrows. Casabe may have existed as early as 2000 BC. According to food writer Richard Foss, it originated in the region of the modern-day Colombia–Venezuela border and spread across Caribbean South America. It is possible that, as cultures from South America expanded, they introduced casabe to pre-agricultural cultures of the Antilles.

Archaeological sites of the Saladoid culture of modern-day Venezuela, dating to the Archaic Period, feature clay griddles that could have been used for casabe, though these were likely used for other foods. (Note: Evidence shows that these griddles were used for maize, beans, sweet potato, and fish. Evidence of cassava cooked on griddles has been found at the site of En Bas Saline on Hispaniola, dating to the mid-15th century.) In the following Ceramic Period, casabe is associated with an archaeological complex in the Antilles and Caribbean South America, characterized by hemispheric pots—although casabe itself was not made with pots. Casabe is also associated with the presence of budares, found only in agricultural societies, although other baked products existed in hunter-gatherer societies.

Casabe was likely a common provision in the Antilles, including among the Taíno people of Hispaniola and Puerto Rico. It was produced at large scales, and a by-product was turned into cassareep, served alongside casabe as a dipping sauce. Taíno production of casabe may have been the cause of cassava being a staple. Within the gendered division of labor of the Taíno, women made the griddles used for casabe. In Taíno mythology, the major deity Yúcahu was associated with the knowledge of producing casabe, and Taíno shamans gave casabe as offerings to zemi spirits during an annual festival, whose participants received small pieces to keep for a year.

The Arawak of northern South America, a culture related to the Taíno, similarly consumed casabe. It was also consumed by the Carib people, including the Mainland Carib of South America and the Island Carib (Kalinago) of the Lesser Antilles; they ate it with pepperpot. The Island Caribs made a fermented beverage called ouicou by chewing and spitting out casabe, using spit as a fermentation starter. Ceramic griddles, likely used for casabe, were common in the Orinoco Basin before the colonial era. Casabe was not found in some nearby regions, such as the Isthmus of Panama, where cornbread was instead consumed.

According to geographer Francisco Watlington, cassava production in parts of the Caribbean was over 15 long tons per hectare (6.2 t/acre), so the bread was produced at a rate of at least 5,000 kilograms per hectare (4,500 lb/acre). The requirement for firewood contributed to deforestation in Hispaniola and Puerto Rico. For people who conducted lengthy voyages for hunting, fishing, trading, or visiting relatives, casabe was useful as a portable food. The Igneri people, whose trading colonies spanned from the Orinoco to Puerto Rico, filled canoes and warehouses with the bread. Archaeological excavations in the Antilles have found griddles with unique designs that may have indicated social groups.

=== Adoption by Spanish colonists ===
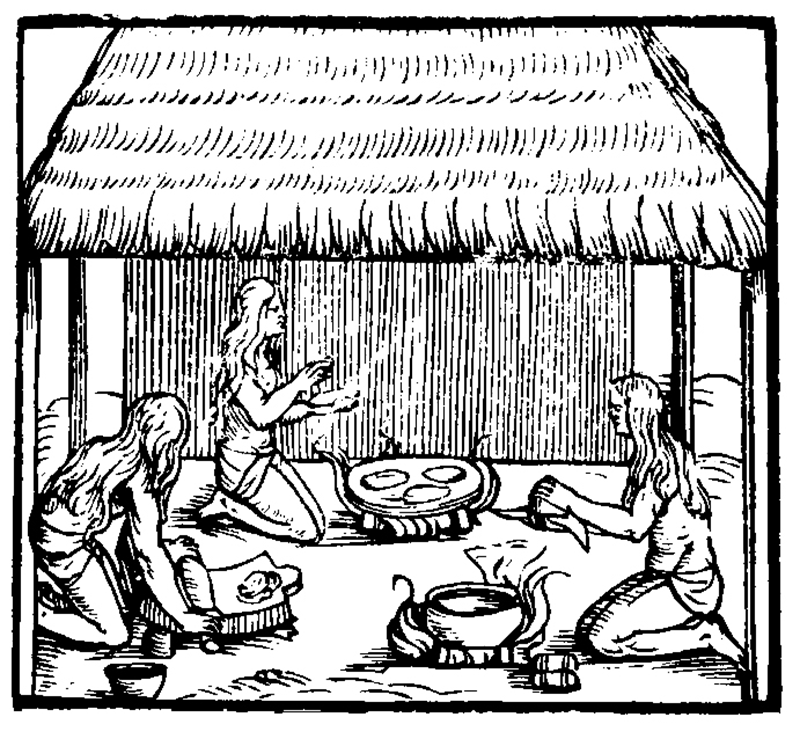
Taíno women making casabe, 1565

Once Spanish colonists came to the Americas, casabe was one of the first local foods they adopted. The Taíno gave casabe to Christopher Columbus, who arrived in Hispaniola in 1492 and shared a meal with the Taíno leader Guacanagaríx. He brought cassava flour to make casabe on his 1496 return voyage to Spain. Spanish writers—beginning with Ramón Pané, who reached Hispaniola in 1494—referred to casabe as bread. Pané also noted the role of casabe in mythology. Naturalist Gonzalo Fernández de Oviedo wrote a detailed description of casabe making in the 1520s. He wrote that the Taíno could live twenty days without eating, or longer if they ate casabe. Noting that casabe was easy to produce, transport, and store, Oviedo demonstrated its usefulness for sailors by bringing samples to Spain. He also considered it a highly demanded and profitable product, recording how supply and demand affected the price of casabe in the city of Santo Domingo, Hispaniola. Both Oviedo and Bartolomé de las Casas wrote that the common people of the Antilles ate thick casabe, while the nobility ate thin, white casabe. Columbus and Las Casas noted that the Taíno of Hispaniola had storehouses filled with dried casabe.

While recognizing its usefulness, Spanish explorers disliked the taste of cassava. According to a 1590 account by José de Acosta, the Spanish considered it "an appropriate food to discourage gluttony because it could be eaten without the slightest concern that desire for it would cause excess". Acosta wrote that the best type of casabe was jaujau, but he "would much prefer a piece of bread no matter how black it was". Physician Nicolás Monardes wrote that he preferred cornbread, although it had a lower shelf life. Other 16th-century writers who disparaged casabe included Tomás de la Torre, who compared it to eating sawdust; Girolamo Benzoni, who compared it to eating dirt; and José de Acosta, who called it "a tasteless, bland thing, but healthy and nourishing". On the other hand, Las Casas described casabe as "the best bread that I believe there is in the world after that of wheat". Writer Peter Martyr d'Anghiera believed casabe was easier to digest, and therefore healthier, than wheat bread. Portuguese records widely noted that casabe was long-lasting. As Spanish people ate casabe due to its availability, a proverb arose: "In the absence of bread, casabe"; (Note: Spanish: A falta de pan, casabe.) this expression remains popular in Cuba.

Spanish colonists carried casabe during expeditions and military actions, so it was an important food during the early era of Spanish colonization of the Americas. Colonists of the Province of Tierra Firme, encompassing Caribbean South America, ate casabe as they lacked wheat. The bread also played a role in the encomienda system of forced labor in the area. Las Casas noted that cassava was an efficient crop that colonists planted in order to feed casabe to their indigenous laborers. Las Casas estimated that the typical Taíno adult ate 500 g (18 oz) of casabe per day.

=== Colonial period and large-scale production ===
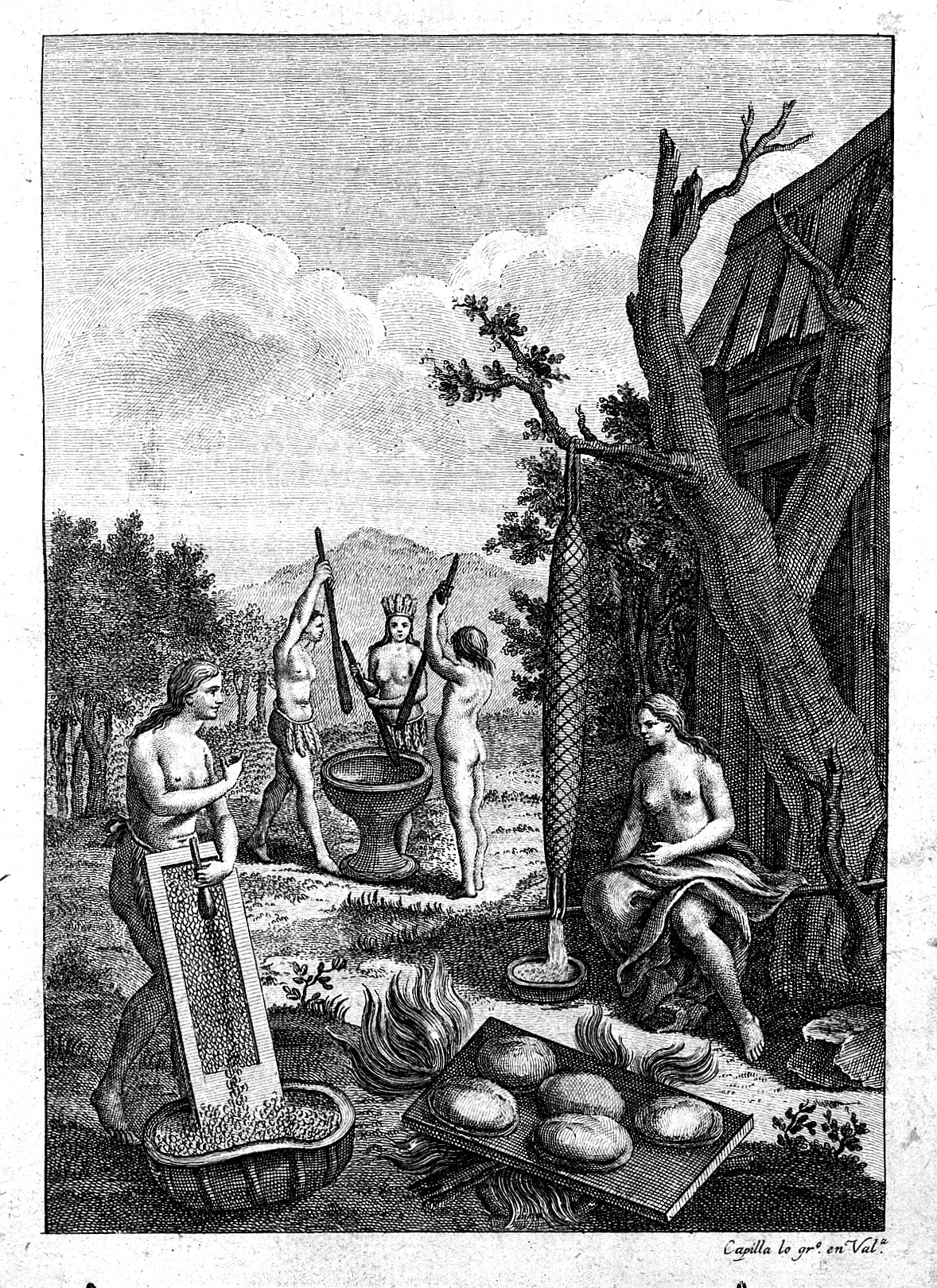
Processing of bitter cassava, 1791

The 16th century saw the mass production of indigenous products such as casabe, a product primarily made in rural areas. Some villages gave casabe as tribute to the empire, while others—particularly in eastern Hispaniola—exported it to Spanish ships. Some indigenous communities specialized in such products. The indigenous community of Mona Island, near Puerto Rico, produced over 75 tons of casabe annually in the 1510s and 1520s, exporting it on slave ships across the Caribbean. Communities of the Orinoco sold surplus casabe in exchange for tools and other essential products. Based on archaeological evidence, these communities continued to use clay griddles while using fewer grindstones, possibly indicating an increased focus on casabe.

Casabe became one of the most common items of trade between the peoples of Guiana region and Europeans; casabe produced in Colombia and Venezuela was exported to Panama City via the port of Portobelo. Cuba also exported casabe in the early period of Spanish colonization. Although the colonists of Cuba preferred wheat bread, casabe was necessary to meet demand for food, so the city council of Havana discussed increasing its production.

Casabe was widely used as sailors' rations, in place of hardtack, by the 1570s. It became common among buccaneers when wheat bread was unavailable. English privateer Francis Drake described casabe as a better food than hardtack for his sailors. Sailors popularized casabe beyond the Americas. Merchants introduced cassava to Indonesia, where it was used for a bread similar to casabe.

Spanish colonists brought casabe to the Magdalena River valley of Colombia, including the city of Cartagena. Casabe was the most common bread in late-16th-century Cartagena, costing less than maize bread. (Note: In Cartagena in 1588, a 1.5-pound piece of casabe cost one-half real, the same price as 1 pound of cornbread or 0.5 pounds of arepas.) Coast guard sailors in the city had rations including 26 ounces of casabe per day. Casabe was also part of the rations of African slaves in Cartagena, eaten with meat or fish. Casabe and maize breads were produced by slave plantations and were the main foods of Cartagena's slaves, with the latter being about four times as common. However, Cartagena was known as a place where people could eat maize instead of casabe.

As European colonists developed a cuisine, they placed casabe at the bottom of the hierarchy of breads, with wheat bread at the top. However, wheat and barley did not grow in the Caribbean, necessitating casabe and maize. Its consumption was limited to a small region and declined as livestock and sugar were introduced. English colonists in the West Indies ate casabe out of necessity but disliked its flavor. In the English colony of Montserrat, in the 17th century, cassava bread was eaten by laborers who could not afford much else as well as sailors. The Caribs used clay griddles for casabe until the 1630s as iron pans became common.

When French colonists reached the Lesser Antilles in the 1630s, casabe was the region's main staple, and it became part of the diet of French and African populations of the region. As the French writer Daniel Lescallier noted in 1764, foods such as casabe were eaten by the common people, while wheat bread was eaten by the wealthy. The town of Los Minas, Haiti, founded by freed slaves on Hispaniola in the 1760s, was centered around exporting foods, primarily casabe. The Garifuna people, descended from Caribs and Africans in Saint Vincent, inherited cassava bread as a staple. After being relocated to Central America in the late 18th century, they valued cassava bread as an ancestral tradition.

Among indigenous communities of the Orinoco Basin, archaeological evidence of griddles indicates a possible increase in casabe production around the 18th century, possibly to sell to other communities. They continued to commercially produce casabe following the independence of Colombia in the 1820s, and it became a commodity. The region's communities viewed casabe making as a low-status feminine job, while masculine jobs became associated with the new Venezuelan identity. An 1824 text from the Southern United States, The Virginia House-Wife by Mary Randolph, mentions "cassada bread [sic]" in comparison to johnnycakes. This is the northernmost attestation of cassava in this period, and it is likely that the bread was imported to the region from the West Indies. Casabe was also eaten by troops in the Cuban War of Independence in the 1890s.

=== Decline and revival ===
Casabe declined in popularity in the modern era. In Cuba, it was eaten primarily by remote farmers. Consumption in Puerto Rico declined as wheat bread and rice were imported. Venezuelans associated casabe either with the eastern region or with poor people, and it has been eaten in place of wheat bread during times of crisis. Among the Garifuna, production became less frequent as cassava plants were destroyed by Hurricane Mitch of 1998, as well as by pigs, which were increasingly farmed by the community.

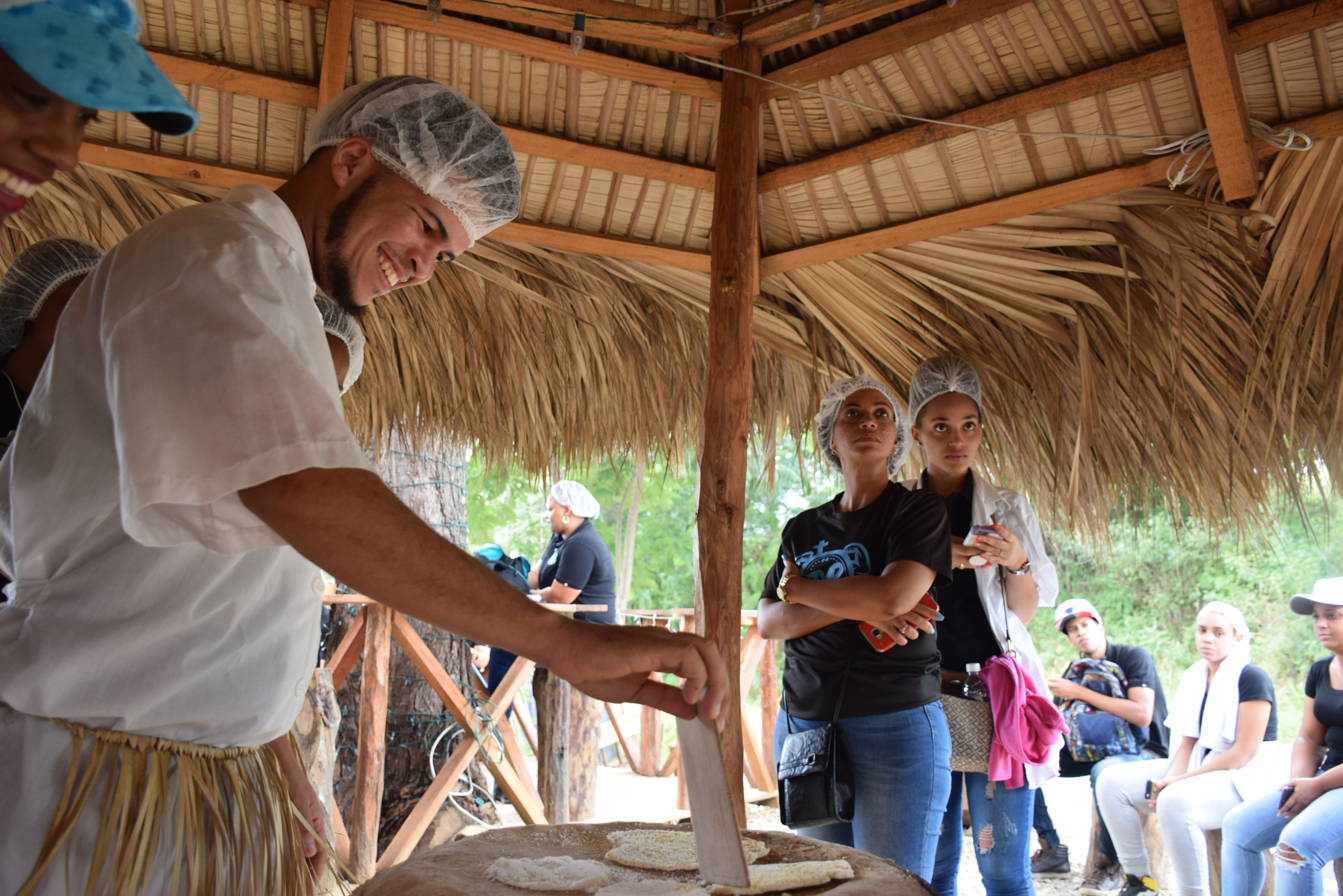
A cultural event in the Dominican Republic demonstrating casabe production

The popularity of casabe has increased amid health concerns and interest in gluten-free food. In Venezuela, it became popular among the upper classes by the 1990s, due to perceived health benefits, particularly fiber. A revival of casabe also occurred in Cuba, supported by researchers, producers, and chefs. The environmental NGO CubaSolar included it on its "Arca del Gusto" project, which listed Cuban foods in need of preservation, and the government listed it as intangible cultural heritage in October 2019.

Casabe was listed as UNESCO Intangible Cultural Heritage for Cuba, the Dominican Republic, Haiti, Honduras, and Venezuela in December 2024, following a joint application in March 2023. Its description emphasized the traditional knowledge involved in preparing the bread, shared between cultures. It was the first listing to include multiple countries in the Americas. The listing was an initiative Haiti's ambassador to UNESCO, Dominique Dupuy, who believed it would highlight the similarities between the country and its neighbors; she described casabe as "a facet of our identity and serves as a reminder that our history is deeply rooted in millennial-old traditions". The delegations of Brazil and Guatemala had not completed their applications before the listing was made, but they, in addition to Paraguay, expressed interest in doing so later.

During the 2024 famine in Haiti, casabe became important as sustenance and as an economic product. Another economic crisis in Cuba contributed to the revival of casabe, made with locally available cassava as food imports decreased.

== Consumption ==
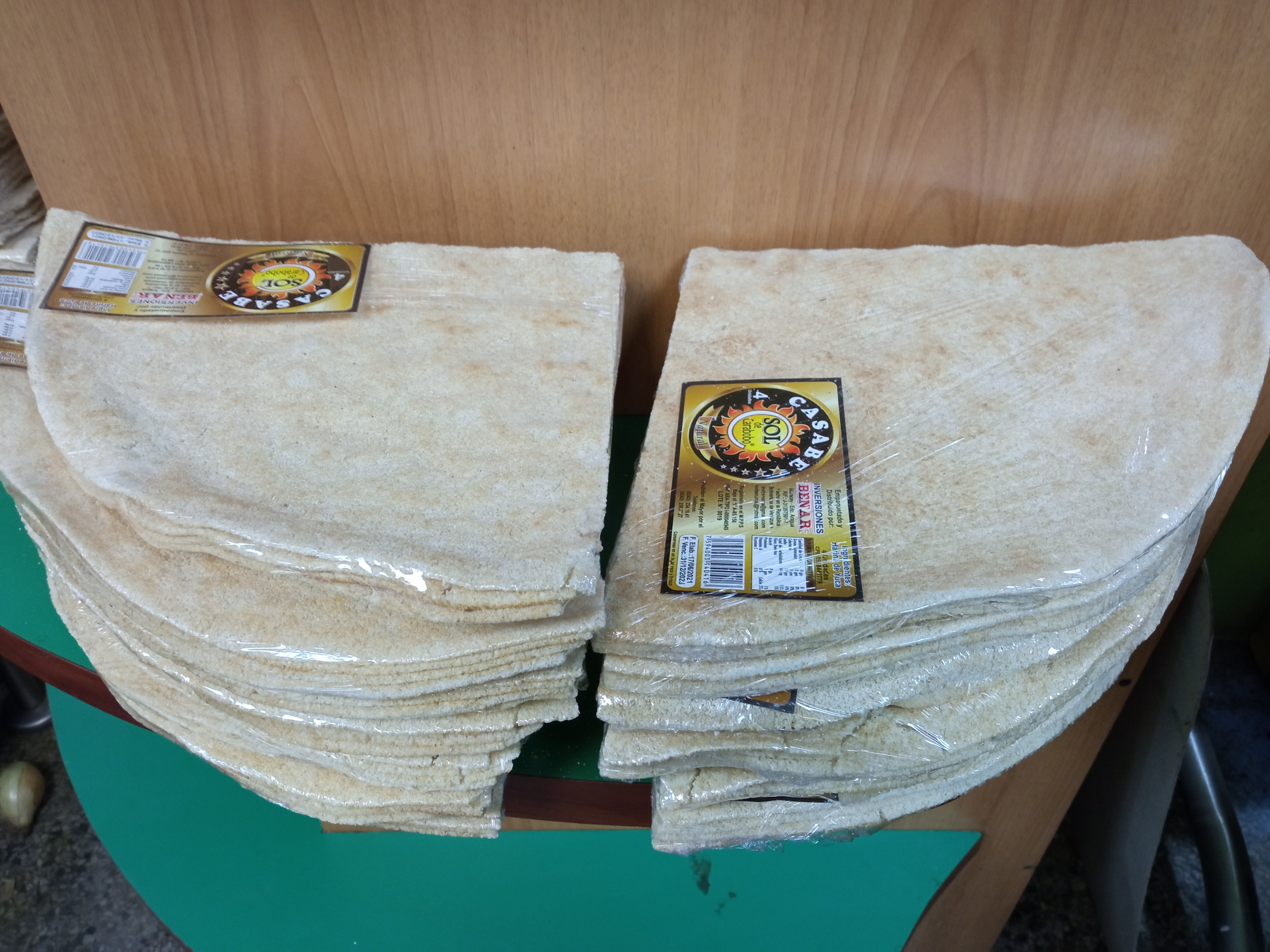
Casabe sold in a supermarket

Casabe is found in several countries of the Caribbean Basin and the Amazon. Consumption of casabe is generally low, with other Latin American breads, including arepas and corn tortillas, being more common. Paraguay has the highest consumption rate, with the average person consuming 340 kg (750 lb) per year, as of 2000. Proponents of casabe view it as healthy, sustainable, and representative of an Indigenous American tradition. The bread is served at culinary festivals, and products are sold with designs celebrating the food.

=== By region ===
Based on scholarly data up to 2017, about 79% of indigenous communities in South America produce casabe or farinha. Casabe is a staple in parts of the Amazon Rainforest, including the north and the Alto Xingu region of the south. It is a major part of the diet of the Tucanoan peoples of the Amazon. A Tucanoan origin myth states that the first woman baked casabe after planting seven varieties of bitter cassava. Communities of the Mirití River in the Colombian Amazon have rituals for the first time a woman prepares casabe, being forbidden from touching the tools before this. For the Muinane people, it is the first solid food fed to babies, ceremonially ensuring that the person will always like it. The Tiriyó Carib people feed casabe to pet birds. The Piaroa people of the Orinoco Basin eat casabe with every meal, making it the only plant-based food they serve alongside animal-based foods. The Ye'kuana, also of the Orinoco, also eat casabe with most meals, viewing it as a requirement for eating meat, fish, and similar foods. Other indigenous groups that widely consume casabe include the Mokaná of northern Colombia.

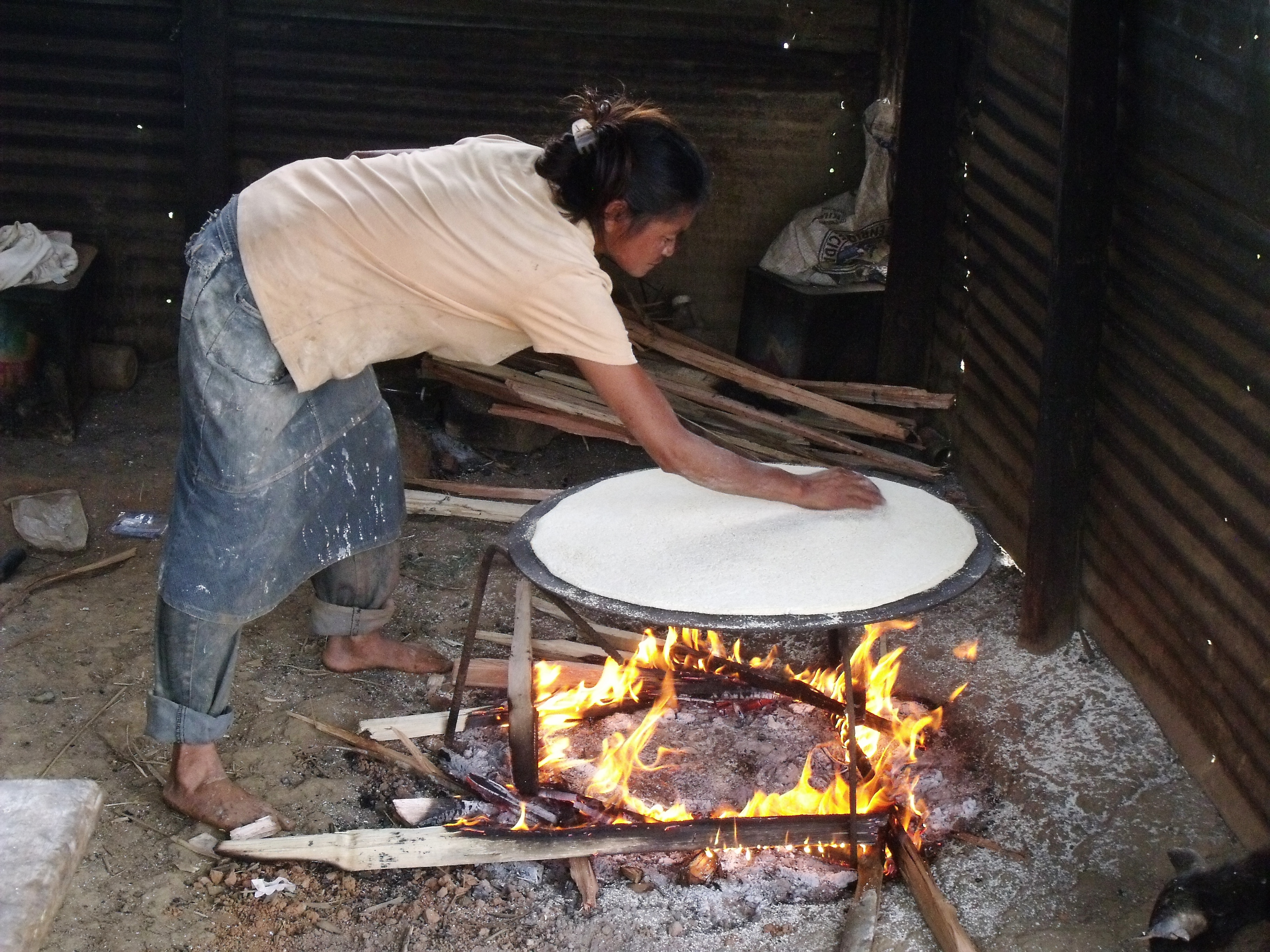
Casabe is widely eaten by Indigenous peoples in Venezuela.

Casabe is strongly associated with Venezuelan cuisine and is eaten across the country. It is widespread among Indigenous and Afro-Venezuelans. In the Guayana Region of eastern Venezuela, it is a staple food, prepared with similar tools to those of ancient times. Restaurants in Venezuela serve it spread with butter or sprinkled with parmesan. In the Llanos region of Venezuela and Colombia, casabe is eaten in place of bread. The price of twenty pieces of casabe in Puerto Ayacucho, Venezuela was US$20 in 1997 (Equivalent to 40 in 2025).

Cassava bread is a common dish in Surinamese cuisine, common to all ethnic groups. It is one of few foods cooked using firewood in the country. The Saramaka people of Suriname prepare cassava bread with curved, intertwined designs, imprinted using two fingers, a type of design common in the culture. Surinamese Jews have used cassava bread in place of matzah when it was unavailable.

Casabe is also found in Cuba, where the cassava plant is widely available. It is often eaten with meals in a limited part of the country, being consumed in six rural provinces of central and eastern Cuba, and 21st-century initiatives have brought it to the west. Peddlers in rural Cuba sell the bread at very affordable prices, under 15 pesos (4 U.S. cents) in 2025. Privately owned restaurants in Havana use it for various dishes and desserts. Cubans commonly eat casabe and roast pork on holidays such as Christmas and New Year's Day.

As cassava is common in Caribbean cuisine, casabe plays a role similar to that of corn tortillas in nearby regions where maize is common. Casabe is particularly common in the cuisine of the Dominican Republic, being found across the country and neighboring Haiti. Dominicans eat it as a snack, and many casabe products are sold in the city of Santo Domingo. It is comparatively less available in Puerto Rico. Thin cassava bread is eaten for Christmas in Montserrat, while a thick cassava bread stuffed with beef is eaten for Christmas in Bermuda. In Dominica, the Kalinago people consume casabe. It is also eaten across ethnic groups in Martinique and Guadeloupe, being a well-known dish of the region. In Trinidad and Tobago, the only producer of cassava bread is the Santa Rosa First Peoples Community.

Among the Garifuna, cassava bread—known as ereba—is a staple food and is considered an important part of their identity. They eat it with butter or seafood dishes. Ereba production is a communal process between the men and women of a family or neighborhood. The use of presses led men to join the process, and most men know how to make it. Still, in Garifuna villages of Honduras, the final baking is exclusively performed by women. Ereba is also mass-produced. In the Garifuna religion, shamans (buyeis) offer cassava bread to the spirits of the dead during the Chugu ceremony. The color of the bread holds ritual significance, as the Garifuna identify it as red (funati), which attracts spirits, though white areba is made for the Agowaguduni ceremony for the recently deceased.

Casabe has been introduced to cities in the East Coast of the United States. Within the Dominican diaspora in New York City, casabe is sold by supermarkets and bodegas.

== See also ==
- List of cassava dishes
- Amazonian cuisine
