= List of World Heritage Sites in the Caribbean =

Location of World Heritage Sites in the Caribbean

This is a list of UNESCO World Heritage Sites in the Caribbean.

== Legend ==
Site; as per officially inscribed name
Location; at city, regional, or provincial level and geocoordinates
Criteria; as defined by the World Heritage Committee
Area; in hectares and acres. If available, the size of the buffer zone has been noted as well. A value of zero implies that no data has been published by UNESCO
Year; during which the site was inscribed to the World Heritage List
Description; brief information about the site, including reasons for qualifying as an endangered site, if applicable

== World Heritage Sites ==
† In danger
* Trans-border site

Site	Image	Location	Criteria	Area ha (acre)	Year	Description	Refs
Alejandro de Humboldt National Park	Tall green trees and hills are on both sides of a river in the center.	Holguín and Guantánamo, Cuba; 20°27′N 75°0′W	Natural: (ix), (x)	69,341 (171,350); buffer zone 34,330 (84,800)	2001	The park exhibits a wide array of geology types. It contains many biological species, including 16 of Cuba's 28 endemic plant species, as well as animal species such as the endangered Cuban solenodon.	
Antigua Naval Dockyard and Related Archaeological Sites		English Harbour, Antigua, Antigua & Barbuda; 17°00′30″N 61°45′52″W	Cultural: (ii), (iv)	255 (630); buffer zone 3,873 (9,570)	2016	The site consists of a group of Georgian-style naval buildings and structures, set within a walled enclosure. The natural environment of this side of the island of Antigua, with its deep, narrow bays surrounded by highlands, offered shelter from hurricanes and was ideal for repairing ships. The construction of the Dockyard by the British navy would not have been possible without the labour of generations of enslaved Africans since the end of the 18th century. Its aim was to protect the interests of sugar cane planters at a time when European powers were competing for control of the Eastern Caribbean.	
The Archaeological Ensemble of 17th Century Port Royal		Kingston Parish, Jamaica	Cultural: (iv), (vi)	27; buffer zone 292.27	2025	The site contains the remnants of the pirate city of Port Royal, destroyed by earthquakes in 1692 and later in 1907, with most of it being now located underwater.	
Archaeological Landscape of the First Coffee Plantations in the South-East of Cuba	Old coffee plantation in the hills above Santiago, Cuba.	Santiago de Cuba and Guantánamo, Cuba; 20°00′21″N 75°37′4″W	Cultural: (iii), (iv)	81,475 (201,330)	2000	During the 19th and early 20th centuries, eastern Cuba was primarily involved with coffea cultivation. The remnants of the plantations display the techniques used in the difficult terrain, as well as the economic and social significance of the plantation system in Cuba and the Caribbean.	
Blue and John Crow Mountains	View over a mountain valley	Jamaica; 18°04′39″N 76°34′16″W	Mixed: (iii), (vi), (x)	26,252 (64,870); buffer zone 28,494 (70,410)	2015	The park covers roughly about 4.5% of Jamaica.	
Brimstone Hill Fortress National Park	Fortifications near the sea.	Saint Kitts, Saint Kitts and Nevis; 17°20′49″N 62°50′14″W	Cultural: (iii), (iv)	—	1999	Built during the 17th and 18th centuries by African slaves in a period of European colonial expansion, the fortress is an exceptionally well preserved example of British military architecture in the Caribbean.	
Colonial City of Santo Domingo	Low old houses and a church with a large white cupola in the distance.	Distrito Nacional, Dominican Republic; 18°29′0″N 69°55′0″W	Cultural: (ii), (iv), (vi)	93 (230)	1990	Santo Domingo was founded in 1498 shortly after the arrival of Christopher Columbus on the island and had the first cathedral, hospital, customs house and university built in the New World. Its grid patterned town plan became the model for other colonial towns in the Americas.	
Desembarco del Granma National Park		Granma, Cuba; 19°53′N 77°38′W	Natural: (vii), (viii)	32,576 (80,500)	1999	The park features a unique karst topography with features such as terraces, cliffs, and waterfalls.	
Historic Area of Willemstad, Inner City and Harbour, Curaçao	Port with colorful houses in blue, brown, green, yellow, pink.	Willemstad, Curaçao, Netherlands; 12°6′7″N 68°54′8″W	Cultural: (ii), (iv), (v)	86 (210); buffer zone 87 (210)	1997	The architecture of the 17th-century Dutch trading settlement Willemstad combines styles from the Netherlands with Spanish and Portuguese colonial towns.	
Historic Bridgetown and its Garrison	Clock tower of red bricks.	Bridgetown; Barbados; 13°5′48″N 59°36′50″W	Cultural: (ii), (iii), (iv)	187 (460); buffer zone 321 (790)	2011	Bridgetown is an excellent example of a British colonial settlement built from the 17th to 19th century. Unlike Dutch and Spanish settlements of the area, the town is not laid out on a grid plan but follows a serpentine urban design.	
Historic Centre of Camagüey	There is a large stone building in the center with a tall tower. Behind are several smaller buildings with red roofs.	Camagüey, Cuba; 21°22′43″N 77°55′7″W	Cultural: (iv), (v)	54 (130); buffer zone 276 (680)	2008	Camagüey is among the first seven villages founded by the Spanish in Cuba, first settled in 1528. The irregular organization of the city is distinct from the typical, orderly construction of most other Spanish settlements. This maze-like style was influenced by medieval European ideas and traditional construction methods of early immigrant masons and construction workers.	
La Fortaleza and San Juan National Historic Site in Puerto Rico	Buildings with wrought-iron balconies line a cobbled street.	San Juan; Puerto Rico, United States; 18°28′0″N 66°7′30″W	Cultural: (vi)	33 (82)	1983	A series of defensive structures built between the 16th and 20th centuries at a strategic point in the Caribbean Sea to protect the city and the Bay of San Juan. They represent a fine display of European military architecture adapted to harbour sites on the American continent.	
Morne Trois Pitons National Park	Valley and reddish rocks.	south central part of the island, Dominica; 15°16′N 61°17′W	Natural: (viii), (x)	6,857 (16,940)	1997		
National History Park – Citadel, Sans Souci, Ramiers	Ruins of a large stone building and flight of steps.	Nord, Haiti; 19°34′25″N 72°14′39″W	Cultural: (iv), (vi)	—	1982	Sans-Souci Palace was the royal residence constructed by King Henri I. It was the most important of nine palaces built by the king, along with fifteen châteaux, numerous forts, and sprawling summer homes on his twenty plantations. The Citadelle Laferrière is a large mountaintop fortress in northern Haiti, and is the largest fortress in the Americas. The mountaintop fortress has itself become a national icon of Haiti, featured on currency, stamps, and tourist ministry posters. The Buildings of Ramiers were among the first monuments constructed after the Haitian Revolution.	
Old Havana and its Fortifications	A city street with a tall, old looking building in the center. It has two circular towers on either end that are taller than the rest of the building.	La Habana, Cuba; 23°8′0″N 82°21′0″W	Cultural: (iv), (v)	143 (350)	1982	Havana was founded in 1519 by Spanish colonists, growing to become one of the Caribbean's primary shipbuilding centers by the 17th century. The old city was built in the Baroque and Neoclassical styles. Historical landmarks in Old Havana include La Cabaña, the Cathedral of Havana and the Great Theatre of Havana.	
Pitons Management Area	A pair of steep conical rocks rising from the sea.	near Soufrière, Saint Lucia; 13°48′26″N 61°4′13″W	Natural: (vii), (viii)	2,909 (7,190)	2004		
San Pedro de la Roca Castle, Santiago de Cuba	A series of walls made of stone sit on a hill that is above water.	Santiago de Cuba Province, Cuba; 19°58′0″N 75°52′15″W	Cultural: (iv), (v)	—	1997	The large fort was built to defend the important port of Santiago de Cuba. The design of the fortification was based on Italian and Renaissance architecture. The complex of magazines, bastions, and batteries is one of the most complete and well-preserved Spanish-American defense fortifications.	
Trinidad and the Valley de los Ingenios	A group of buildings with red roofs in the middle of green trees and hills. There is a taller building with a tower in the center.	Sancti Spíritus Province, Cuba; 21°48′11″N 79°59′4″W	Cultural: (iv), (v)	—	1988	The city of Trinidad was founded in the early 16th century. In 1518, Hernán Cortés began his expedition to conquer Mexico from the port at Trinidad. The city prospered throughout the colonial period in large part due to the success of the local sugar industry. The adjacent Valley de los Ingenios was the origin of the Cuban sugar industry, which emerged in the 18th century. It is home to numerous cane sugar mills, as well as cattle ranches and tobacco plantations.	
Urban Historic Centre of Cienfuegos	A building with yellow walls has two towers of different heights with round red roofs. There are bells in the tallest tower.	Cienfuegos, Cuba; 22°8′50″N 80°27′10″W	Cultural: (ii), (v)	—	2005	Cienfuegos was founded in 1819 as a Spanish colony, though its first inhabitants were French immigrants. It became a trade center in the sugar cane, tobacco, and coffee trade because of its location on the Bay of Cienfuegos. Because of its establishment in the later colonial period, the architecture has more modern influences: including modern ideas of urban planning.	
Viñales Valley	There is a field with tall grass and trees and a small wooden hut in the front, and steep cliffs in the back.	Pinar del Río Province, Cuba; 22°37′N 83°43′W	Cultural: (iv)	—	1999	The village of Viñales was founded in 1875 after the expansion of tobacco cultivation in the surrounding valley. The Valley features a karst topography, vernacular architecture, and traditional cultivation methods. The Valley was also the site of various military engagements in the Cuban War of Independence and Cuban Revolution.	
Volcanoes and Forests of Mount Pelée and the Pitons of Northern Martinique	Waterfront village with volcanic mountain in the background.	Saint-Pierre, Martinique, France; 14°49′23.39″N 61°10′33.1″W	Cultural: (viii), (x)	13,980 (34,500); buffer zone 28,826 (71,230)	2023	Volcanic area of global significance to vulcanology, and home to a number of endemic species.	

== Tentative list ==
In addition to sites inscribed on the World Heritage List, member states can maintain a list of tentative sites that they may consider for nomination. Nominations for the World Heritage List are only accepted if the site was previously listed on the tentative list.

Ref No.	Site	Image	Location	Year listed	UNESCO criteria	Description
6070	Historic Lighthouses of The Bahamas		Bahamas	2015	iii (cultural)	For over 150 years, British Imperial Lighthouse Service lights have been a constant in Bahamian maritime history. They are symbols of the unique heritage of maritime navigation. There are only a few of these hand-wound kerosene-burning lighthouses left in the world and they are found in the Bahamas.
6071	The Inagua National Park		Inagua, Bahamas	2015	vi, x (mixed)	It is an important area for breeding, passage and wintering for numerous species of waterbirds and is one of the only Wetlands of International Importance in the Caribbean. It has the largest breeding colony of Caribbean flamingos.
1993	The Scotland District of Barbados		Saint Andrew's Parish and Saint Joseph's Parish Barbados	2005	not stated (natural)	The Scotland District of Barbados has base of sedimentary rocks and is the only place in the Caribbean that a submarine mountain range lies above water. This sparsely populated region holds interesting rock formations created by tectonic movement and erosion.
5942	The Industrial Heritage of Barbados: The Story of Sugar and Rum		Barbados	2014	ii, iii, vi (cultural)	Sugarcane landscapes are an outstanding example of a cultural landscape shaped by Europeans and Africans in the Atlantic World. The site illustrates the impact of human settlement, slave labour and agricultural activities, and more specifically the production of Caribbean sugar and rum, from the mid-17th century on the natural landscape.
1798	National Schools of Art, Cubanacán		Havana, Cuba	2003	i, ii, iii, iv, v (cultural)	The site is one of the most outstanding examples of contemporary Latin American architecture, with an acknowledged artistic value, reuniting testimonial values stemming from the historic moment in which it was built, when cement and concrete were scarce in Cuba.
1801	Ciénaga de Zapata National Park		Matanzas, Cuba	2003	vii, ix, x (natural)	It is an extensive ecosystem made up of mangrove forests, keys, seagrass beds, coral reef barriers and deep reefs. The conservation status of coral reefs in the area is most remarkable.
1802	Reef System in the Cuban Caribbean		Cuba	2003	vii, x (natural)	The site is a series of marine protected areas with well-preserved underwater ecosystems stretching 800 km along the Caribbean coastline of Cuba.
6020	Fort Shirley		Saint John Parish, Dominica	2015	ii, iv (cultural)	Fort Shirley was formerly a military outpost, a sterling example of its kind in the West Indies. It was the scene of a famous revolt of African slave soldiers in protest over their conditions there in 1802. Their action resulted in all slave soldiers in the British Empire being made free in 1807.
6021	Morne Diablotin National Park		Saint Joseph Parish, Dominica	2015	vii, x (natural)	The site is home to two endemic bird species — Dominica's national bird, the sisserou parrot, and the Jaco red-necked parrot — which occur nowhere else on Earth. The Park also covers a wide range of habitats, including the globally rare elfin woodland ecosystem.
6022	Soufriere-Scott's Head Marine Reserve		Saint Mark Parish, Dominica	2015	vii, x (natural)	The site is a vast submerged volcanic crater, with some of the most pristine marine environments in the Caribbean. The site also has significant cultural importance to the indigenous Carib people.
1704	Jacagua, Villa of Santiago		Santiago Province, Dominican Republic	2001	not stated (cultural)	A former Spanish-founded rural settlement that now represents the precursor to the modern city of Santiago. The site preserves the ruins of the former brick and masonry church.
1705	Montecristi		Monte Cristi Province, Dominican Republic	2001	not stated (cultural)	Surrounded by a mountainous and maritime environment the city is notable for its wooden Victorian houses that date to its booming period during the 18th and 19th centuries.
1707	Archaeological and Historical National Park of Pueblo Viejo, La Vega		La Vega Province, Dominican Republic	2001	not stated (cultural)	The site includes the Pueblo Viejo fortress and old town, founded in 1495 for Christopher Columbus, and the former gold mine and foundry that the fortress was built to protect.
1708	Historical Centre of Puerto Plata		Puerto Plata Province, Dominican Republic	2001	not stated (cultural)	The architecture of the historic centre of Puerto Plata combines popular Victorian styles of the 19th-century with traditional vernacular styles creating a unique landscape that contrasts with the Spanish colonial history of the city.
1709	City of Azúa de Compostela		Azua Province, Dominican Republic	2001	not stated (cultural)	Founded in 1504 by Diego Velázquez de Cuéllar, the original settlement of Azua de Compostela was one of the oldest European settlements in the Americas until its destruction in 1751 with its ruins preserved as a historical park.
1714-1715	Ruta de los Ingenios		Distrito Nacional and La Altagracia Province, Dominican Republic	2002	ii, iv, v (cultural)	Ruta de los Ingenios (Route of Sugarmills) consists of two sugarcane plantations and mills: Nuestra Señora de Monte Alegre (La Duquesa) and the Sanate Sugar Mills.
6289	Archaeological Site of Villa La Isabela		Puerto Plata Province, Dominican Republic	2018	ii, v (cultural)	Founded by Christopher Columbus in 1493 during his second voyage to the Americas, La Isabela was the first settlement to be founded by a European power in the New World. The archaeological site preserves the foundation of some of the first European houses, a watchtower, a warehouse, the church and a cemetery.
6290	Jaragua National Park		Pedernales Province, Dominican Republic	2018	i, iii, vii, ix, x (mixed)	The largest protected area in the Caribbean contains Taino archaeological sites in addition to dry forests, mangroves, marine habitats and the Baoruco Mountain Range.
6291	First Colonial Sugar Mills of the Americas		San Cristóbal and Santo Domingo Provinces, Dominican Republic	2018	ii, iv (cultural)	The site consists of four archaeological sites dating to the 16th-century containing the remnants of the oldest sugarcane mills in the Americas.
6292	Cotubanamá National Park		La Altagracia and La Romana Provinces, Dominican Republic	2018	i, ii, iii (cultural)	The archeological heritage of Cotubanamá represents some of the best-preserved evidence to the Taino culture evident in its petroglyphs and ceremonial ball courts (bateyes), in addition to evidence of one of the first contacts between Europeans and indigenous cultures of the Americas.
6293	La Plata and Navidad Banks Marine Mammal Sanctuary		Dominican Republic	2018	iii, ix, x (mixed)	Protected marine area that includes La Plata, Navidad and Pañuelo banks in addition to portions of the Samaná Bay. The area is historically notable for the number of well-preserved colonial era shipwrecks and biologically important for its unusually high diversity of cetacean species.
6294	Pre-Hispanic Rock Art in the Dominican Republic		Hato Mayor, La Altagracia, Pedernales and San Cristóbal Provinces, Dominican Republic	2018	i, iii (cultural)	Prehistoric rock art consisting of paintings, petroglyphs and bas-reliefs found in five caves across the country in the Cotubanamá (formerly Del Este), Jaragua and Los Haitises National Parks, and the Pomier Caves Reserve.
1924	St. George Historic District		Saint George Parish, Grenada	2004	ii (cultural)	The historic district of St. George is notable for the contrast between the blend of the planned section of the town with its distinctive Georgian architecture and the unplanned section with a distinctive Caribbean vernacular style.
1926	St. George Fortified System		Saint George Parish, Grenada	2004	ii, iv (cultural)	The fortified system of St. George was established to take advantage over the geography of the amphitheater-shaped bay.
5845	Grenadines Island Group		Grenada and Saint Vincent and the Grenadines	2013	iii, iv, v, viii, x (mixed)	The Grenadines islands consist of 32 islands spanning the Windward Islands between Saint Vincent and Grenada. The site represents the encounter of numerous cultures (indigenous Carib, Garifuna, African, European and South Asian) and rich insular and marine environments.
1947	Historic Centre of Jacmel		Sud-Est Department, Haiti	2004	ii, iv (cultural)	The colonial city of Jacmel was founded in 1698 over an ancient pre-Columbian village.
5431	Seville Heritage Park		Saint Ann Parish, Jamaica	2009	ii, iii, iv (cultural)	One of Jamaica's most significant historical sites due to the presence of Taino, Spanish and British archaeological sites.
5627	National Marine Park		Bonaire, Netherlands	2011	vii, ix (natural)	Established in 1979, Bonaire National Marine Park is the oldest marine reserve in the world. The unique combination of species and high biodiversity make the Park's coral reefs and mangroves outstanding.
5632	Plantations in West Curaçao		Curaçao, Netherlands	2011	ii, iv, v (cultural)	The plantations of West Curaçao are a cultural landscape that uniquely reflect a distinctive variant of the Caribbean slave plantation society that evolved between the mid-17th and early 20th centuries.
1116	Historic zone of Basseterre		Saint George Basseterre Parish, Saint Kitts and Nevis	1998	not stated (cultural)	Evidence of the French origins of the town can be seen in the urban grid of the historic downtown of Basseterre with clear influences from colonial French and British architecture.
1117	City of Charlestown		Saint Paul Charlestown Parish, Saint Kitts and Nevis	1998	not stated (cultural)	The capital and main settlement of the island of Nevis is notable for its well-preserved colonial Georgian architecture.
5749	Rock Art of St. Vincent and the Grenadines		Saint Vincent and the Grenadines	2012	iii, v, vi (cultural)	The site consists of thirteen well-preserved precolonial petroglyphs distributed throughout river valleys, a coastal peninsula and a rock shelter across the archipelago.
5751	The La Soufrière National Park		Saint Vincent, Saint Vincent and the Grenadines	2012	iii, viii (mixed)	This national park is home to the volcano of La Soufrière and its surrounding environment that contains both archaeological and geological resources that document the anthropological and eruptive history of the volcano.
5644	Banwari Trace Archaeological Site		Banwari Trace, Siparia, Siparia Trinidad and Tobago	2011	iii, v (cultural)	The Banwari Trace deposit is to be found on the southern edge of the Oropuche Lagoon in southwest Trinidad, just west of the Coora River. The site occupies the top of a Miocene hillock, originally covered with deciduous seasonal forest, which rises above the swamp. All of the Archaic sites in the Lesser Antilles and Puerto Rico, including Banwari trace, belong to the Ortoiroid Series, which gets its name from the type site of Ortoire in Trinidad.
5645	La Brea Pitch Lake		La Brea, Siparia Trinidad and Tobago	2011	vii, viii (natural)	The Pitch Lake is found in southwest Trinidad in the village of La Brea. The lake measures approximately one hundred (100) acres (41 hectares), and is estimated to be two hundred and fifty (250) feet (76 metres) deep in the centre. It holds about ten million (10,000,000) tons of pitch. It is situated about twelve hundred (1200) yards from the sea, in a depression immediately south of a 140 feet high hill, from the summit of which the ground slopes gently northwards to the sea.
5646	Tobago Main Ridge Forest Reserve		Mason Hall, Tobago Trinidad and Tobago	2011	v, vi, vii, ix, x (mixed)	Tobago is the smaller, relatively northeasterly island of the Republic of Trinidad and Tobago, with a surface area of about 316 km2. The Main Ridge is literally the backbone of the island, Gutting lengthways across two thirds of Tobago's surface. It encompasses 3958 hectares (9780 acres) of tropical rainforest specifically lower montane, lowland and xerophytic rainforest - and reaches a height of 604 metres. The majority of the forest reserve is lower montane, and is found at heights above 244 metres.
5682	Turks and Caicos Islands		Turks and Caicos Islands, United Kingdom	2012	x (natural)	The extremely hot, dry conditions led to natural salt production in the interior wetlands of the islands, leading to one of the first and major international salt industries in the Americas. The smaller cays are important for breeding seabirds, and endemic reptiles, invertebrates and plants. The wetlands are globally important for shorebirds.

== See also ==
- Lists of World Heritage Sites
