= Pre-Columbian Antilles =

The pre-Columbian history of the area now known as the Antilles was characterized by a diverse population of Native peoples.

The first humans to arrive in the region were the Paleo-Indians, hunter-gatherers who arrived 5000–2000 BC to the area of modern-day Cuba, Hispaniola and Trinidad.

Later on, Trinidad and the Greater Antilles were settled again by the Meso-Indians in 1000–500 BC, who brought with them more sophisticated forms of material culture, such as pottery and toolmaking. These Meso-Indians, known as the Ciboney, concentrated in the western regions of modern-day Cuba and Haiti.

Finally, the third group to inhabit this region were the Taino, Arawakan-speaking people who entered in about 300 BC, as well as the Carib, who migrated after 1000 AD, displacing the Taino in northern Trinidad and the Lesser Antilles.

== First human settlements ==
=== Settlement ===
The first Indigenous people to arrive in the Antilles where Paleo-Indians, estimated to have arrived approximately 5000–2000 BC. The earliest archeological sites, located in Cuba and Hispaniola, date to 4050–550 BC (7000 BP–2500 BP). These early people used mainly stone tools, and also produced stone and shell ornaments.

Although the means of sustenance by these groups are not well-known, there is evidence to suggest that they were foragers of both marine (primarily mollusks) and small terrestrial animals, such as iguanas and rodents. This was not universal however, as studies done on an archeological site in northern Cuba, known as Levisa I, have suggested that the inhabitants dwelling there had a reliance on larger animals, such as manatees, sea turtles and the now extinct Caribbean monk seal, with little contribution from fish and mollusks.

These settlers mainly arrived to the area of Cuba, Hispaniola and Trinidad, as well the northern region of the Lesser Antilles. The islands of the Lesser Antilles each contain only a small number of sites, with the exception of Antigua. The settlers mainly avoided the southern Caribbean, with the exception of Barbados.

== Meso-Indian Settlement and the Early Ceramic Age ==
=== Settlement ===
Approximately 1000-500 BC, Meso-Indians arrived into the Antilles region, a part of a population dispersal that included the Antilles, as well as the Lower Orinoco River basin of modern-day Venezuela.

Until recently, it was assumed that these Meso-Indians originated along the Orinoco River basin, before venturing to the Antilles in about 550 BC. However, it has been recently discovered that the southern Lesser Antilles south of Guadeloupe were settled centuries earlier. It has been suggested now that these Meso-Indian settlers might have moved directly through the Caribbean Sea to the main island of the Antilles, rather than "island-hopping" from South America, as previously thought. The early colonization that happened here could potentially be explained by the oceanographic effects on canoe travel. The channels between the islands act as bottlenecks for currents moving in from the Atlantic, allowing for paddling between South America and the northern Caribbean to be achieved in a matter of a week or so.

While some of these settlers arrived on land that had been occupied by those who had arrived in the first wave, other settlers landed on uninhabited land, such as all of those south of Guadeloupe (except for Barbados).

Settlements of this time period, known as the "Early Ceramic Age", were mainly concentrated on the northern and eastern coasts on the islands, allowing for these settlers to take advantage of trade winds. The interior of these islands were also occupied to a lesser extent, serving purposes such as fresh water collection.

Much of the southern Lesser Antilles area remained unsettled until centuries after the rest of the Antilles, towards the end of the Early Ceramic Age. The reasons for this still remain unclear, however settlements here contain a technological innovation, a well lined with ceramic vessels, allowing settlers to have access to fresh water in these islands, which previously lacked such access.

=== Culture and society ===
These Meso-Indians brought with them a more sophisticated material culture, which included pottery and other ceramics. Many ceramic bowls and vessels contained handles in the shape of humans or animals. A wide variety of ceramic vessels were produced, including griddles for cooking cassava bread and other foods.

Many settlements were strategically located near lithic sources, indicating that like the Paleo-Indians before, stones still played an important role. There was a tradition of making beads out of semi-precious stones and minerals, such as jadeite, diorite and olivine, which was restricted to certain islands only. Rock art became commonplace during this period, with an assortment of petroglyphs and pictographs depicting zoomorphic, geometric and anthropomorphic patterns.

Trade became common between islands, as well as between the Antilles and South America. Distinctive objects, such as duhos, ceremonial seats, were traded from 400 BC to AD 500. Guanin, a gold-copper alloy, has been found hammered into ornaments in Puerto Rico. This alloy is not native to the Caribbean islands, indicating that it was occasionally imported from northern Venezuela, or even Isthmo-Colombian region, further west. This area may have influenced northern Caribbean society in other ways as well. Certain ornaments and decoration in the northern Caribbean resemble those from other culture, such as the Andes.

The settlers of this time period sustained on marine-based animals, but they also used imported crops. Whilst it was formerly thought that very few crops were harvested, new evidence shows the presence of crops such as maize, sweet potato and peanuts.

Some of the imported crops were used for other purposes other than consumption, as indicated by the discovery of ceramic sniffing tubes and inhaling bowls, used to inhale the hallucinogen choba (derived from the seeds of Anadenanthera peregrina).

The first appearance of zemis, spiritually charged objects, is in 250 BC. They were made from a variety of materials, from cotton and wood, to shells and limestone. Many of those discovered have a triangular shape, which some scholars have argued represents the mountainous formations seen in volcanic islands. These artifacts would slowly become more complex in design, something that was accompanied by the arrival and growth of the Taino, as well as the beginning of the Late Ceramic Age.

== The Late Ceramic Age ==
=== Taino ===
Around 300 BC, the Taino, an Arawakan-speaking people, entered the region.

The Taino would become more socially complex over time, with a ruling class emerging in their society. This created a stratified social hierarchy, dominated by rulers called caciques and shamas who managed the religious activity of the people.

Although the artistic craftsmanship of pottery declined during the Late Ceramic Age, the Taino created other forms of art. These amerindians would create artificial such as ceremonial seats called duhos, zoomorphic benches, canopied stands to hold choba powder, ceremonial staffs, and figurines. The Taino also created bateys, pillar stones that were the center of ceremonial events and ball games.

The Taino chiefdoms began to wield significant influence in the Antilles during this time period. This is signified by continued usage of zemis, many of which had characteristics associated with Taino groups.

=== Carib ===
The Carib arrived after 1000 AD, displacing the Taino in northern Trinidad and the Lesser Antilles. They were located on the windward side of settled islands, and were protected against surprise attacks. Unlike the Taino, Carib society was more flexible, lacking caciques.

The Carib are considered to have had superior canoe-building and woven cloth techniques compared to the Taino, though they are considered to have had inferior pottery techniques. The Taino and Carib had mostly similar material culture.

The Late Ceramic Age continued until European contact in the 1400s.
