= Environment of Cuba =

Cuba has a variety of natural habitats and is home to a large number of species, many of them endangered. Since the arrival of European settlers Cuba has experienced deforestation, as more and more forest area has been taken over by humans for agricultural production, resulting in the extinction of some species. Environmental awareness has since increased in Cuba, and in the late 1990s and in the 2000s, the Cuban government started new programs to protect the environment and to increase forest coverage.

== Overview ==
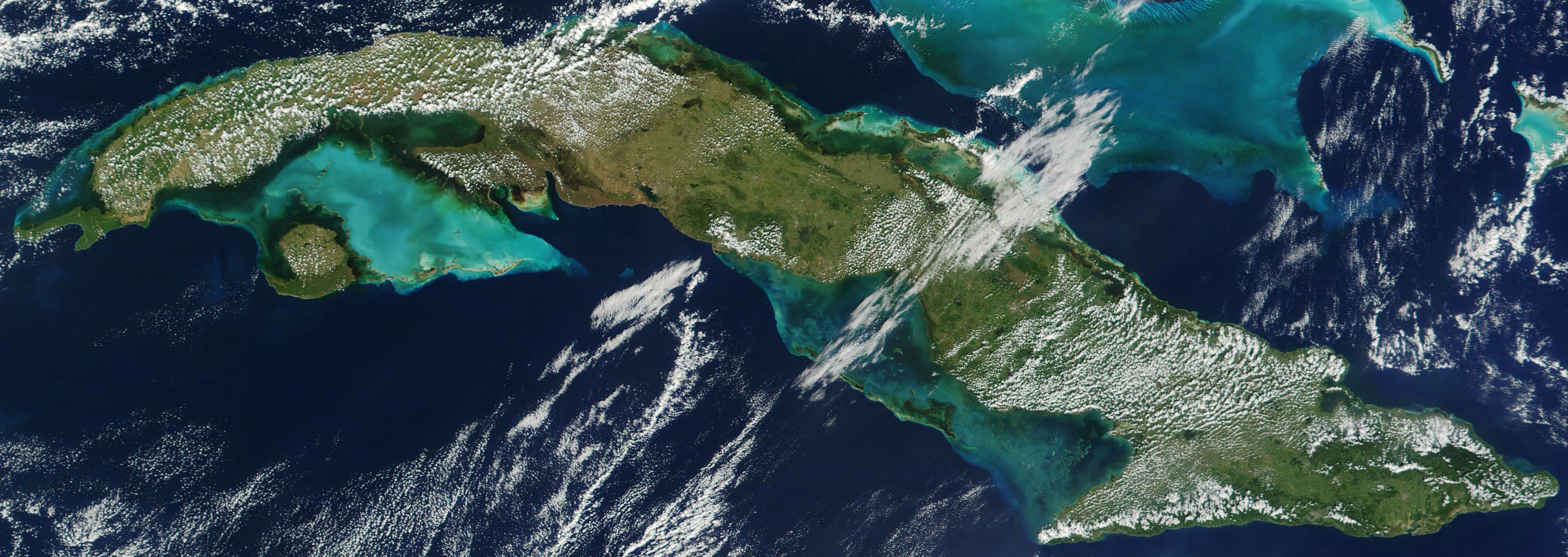
Satellite image of Cuba

Soil and desertification are the main causes of environmental problems. In addition, Cuba has other issues such as deforestation, water pollution, the loss of biodiversity, and air pollution. Soil degradation and desertification are produced by the lack of good farming techniques and natural disasters. Deforestation is killing the forest, for example, by cutting down trees. Water pollution is the contamination of water caused by different industries. Also, the loss of biological diversity is caused by the extinction of different animal species. Lastly, air pollution is largely caused by the increasing number of "old" cars that fill Cuba's streets.

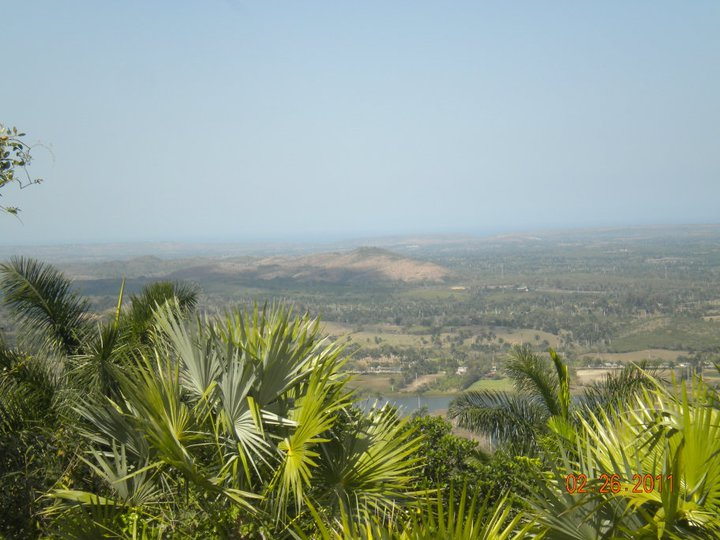
Matanzas

== Forests ==
Cuba had a 2018 Forest Landscape Integrity Index mean score of 5.4/10, ranking it 102nd globally out of 172 countries.

=== Tree cover extent and loss ===
Global Forest Watch publishes annual estimates of tree cover loss and 2000 tree cover extent derived from time-series analysis of Landsat satellite imagery in the Global Forest Change dataset. In this framework, tree cover refers to vegetation taller than 5 m (including natural forests and tree plantations), and tree cover loss is defined as the complete removal of tree cover canopy for a given year, regardless of cause.

For Cuba, country statistics report cumulative tree cover loss of 412,188 ha (4,121.88 km^{2}) from 2001 to 2024 (about 10.3% of its 2000 tree cover area). For tree cover density greater than 30%, country statistics report a 2000 tree cover extent of 4,014,605 ha (40,146.05 km^{2}). The charts and table below display this data. In simple terms, the annual loss number is the area where tree cover disappeared in that year, and the extent number shows what remains of the 2000 tree cover baseline after subtracting cumulative loss. Forest regrowth is not included in the dataset.

Annual tree cover loss in Cuba, 2001–2024. View chart definition.
Tree cover extent in 2000 minus cumulative tree cover loss in Cuba, 2001–2024 (loss-only residual; does not account for gain). View chart definition.

Annual tree cover extent and loss
Year	Tree cover extent (km2) (Note: This residual measure does not include forest regrowth.)	Annual tree cover loss (km2)
2001	39,956.62	189.43
2002	39,806.27	150.35
2003	39,740.70	65.57
2004	39,520.96	219.74
2005	39,392.62	128.34
2006	39,269.57	123.05
2007	39,190.83	78.74
2008	39,020.00	170.83
2009	38,857.40	162.60
2010	38,771.33	86.07
2011	38,608.20	163.13
2012	38,504.74	103.46
2013	38,444.03	60.71
2014	38,385.42	58.61
2015	38,318.16	67.26
2016	37,577.63	740.53
2017	36,809.50	768.13
2018	36,659.94	149.56
2019	36,585.29	74.65
2020	36,459.10	126.19
2021	36,361.88	97.22
2022	36,312.99	48.89
2023	36,125.03	187.96
2024	36,024.17	100.86

=== REDD+ reference level and monitoring ===
Under the UNFCCC REDD+ framework, Cuba submitted its first proposed reference level in 2025. On the UNFCCC REDD+ Web Platform, the submission is listed as “under technical assessment”, while the other Warsaw Framework elements—a national strategy, safeguards, and a national forest monitoring system—are listed as “not reported”.

The 2025 submission is subnational in scope, covering Cuba’s central-eastern region (seven provinces), and uses a 2014–2019 reference period. It reports a proposed net reference level of −19.2 million t CO2 per year, with no adjustment for national circumstances. The included REDD+ activities are enhancement of forest carbon stocks, conservation of forest carbon stocks, and sustainable management of forests.

The submission uses a forest definition of land larger than 0.5 hectares with trees capable of reaching at least 5 metres in height and canopy cover of at least 30%, excluding land used predominantly for agriculture or livestock. It includes above-ground biomass and below-ground biomass and reports CO2 only, while excluding deadwood, litter and soil organic carbon. Activity data were derived using a systematic sampling design interpreted through Collect Earth Online and satellite imagery.

== Marine biodiversity ==
Cuba is renowned for its extensive coral reefs, spanning over 1,000 square miles, and hosting more than one-third of all coral reefs in the Caribbean basin. This makes it home to the region's largest mangrove forest. The Nature Conservancy has been active in Cuba for over 20 years, focusing on improving marine management and implementing ecosystem-based adaptations to climate change. Their work, alongside local government cooperation, aims to preserve Cuba's iconic reefs and rich biodiversity.

== Conservation ==
One of the main solutions used by Cuba to regulate the environmental problem was creating an Environmental Educational program. This helped with the environmental problems by educating Cuban people about observing the environment. For example, the community contributed to neighborhood clean-up techniques. The government created new methods to prevent the destruction of the environment, such as organic farming versus using chemicals to treat the lands. Designated areas were built for garbage and industrial waste instead of dumping them into Havana Bay.

Cuba's approach to addressing environmental challenges includes significant international cooperation. For example, the Sister Sanctuaries Agreement between the U.S. National Oceanic and Atmospheric Administration, the National Park Service, and Cuba's Ministry of Science, Technology, and Environment focuses on stewardship and scientific research in Marine Protected Areas.

Despite challenges in accessing international funds due to political and economic constraints, Cuba has pursued innovative solutions to finance its conservation efforts. Initiatives include the National Fund for Forest Development (FONADEF) and the proposed National Fund for Protected Areas (FONAP), which aim to ensure the financial sustainability of conservation projects. In addition, partnerships with international donors and the exploration of payments for ecosystem services (PES) are part of Cuba's strategy to secure necessary funding for its biodiversity conservation efforts.

In 1994, CubaSolar was established during this energy crisis to bring together engineers, scientists, and planners to develop alternative energy capacity. It seeks to promote solar energy, biogas, hydropower, and solar thermal energy. CubaSolar has participated in projects to mitigate desertification. It has built greenhouses for research on seed cultivation.
