= Pueblo Viejo National Park =

National Park in the Dominican Republic

Coordinates: 19°17′36.960″N 70°32′39.120″W

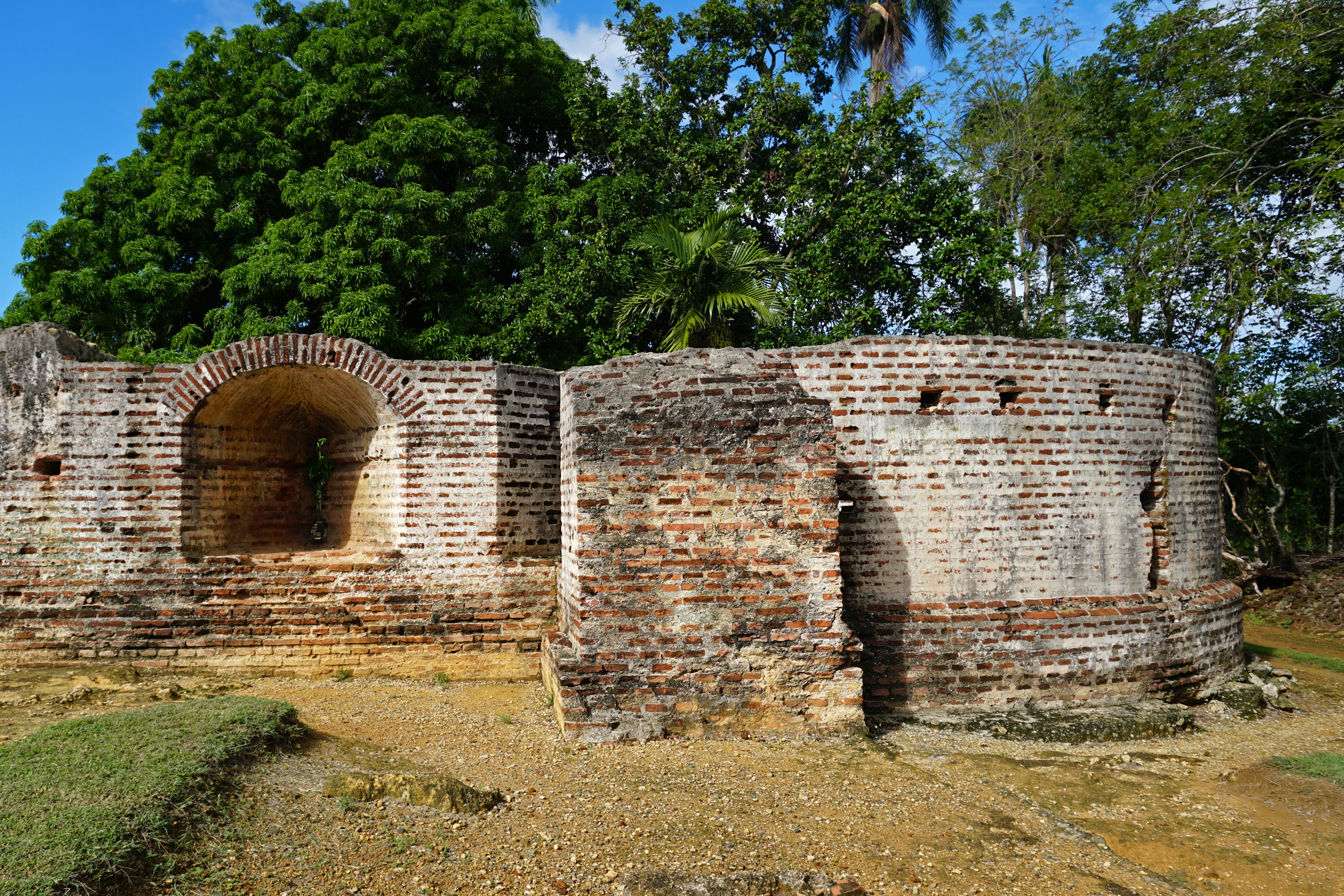
Ruins of La Concepción fortress at Pueblo Viejo National Park.

The Archaeological and Historical National Park of Pueblo Viejo, La Vega (also known as the National Park of Concepción de la Vega), in the La Vega Province of the Dominican Republic, includes the old city of Concepción de la Vega, and the Pueblo Viejo gold mine. This site was added to the UNESCO World Heritage Tentative List on November 21, 2001 in the Cultural category.

== History ==
The city of La Concepción de la Vega was founded as a fortress by Christopher Columbus in 1495. The city was built up around the fortress and the gold mine of Pueblo Viejo, as the extraction of precious metals was the main objective of Columbus' missions to the new world. The town was destroyed by an earthquake on December 2, 1562, and the survivors moved to the present site on the banks of the Camú River.

== Mining ==
The Pueblo Viejo mine is the Dominican Republic's only gold mine, and was at one point the Western Hemisphere's largest and most productive gold mine. The first extraction of gold from this site was undertaken in the late 15th and early 16th centuries, however.

== Gallery ==
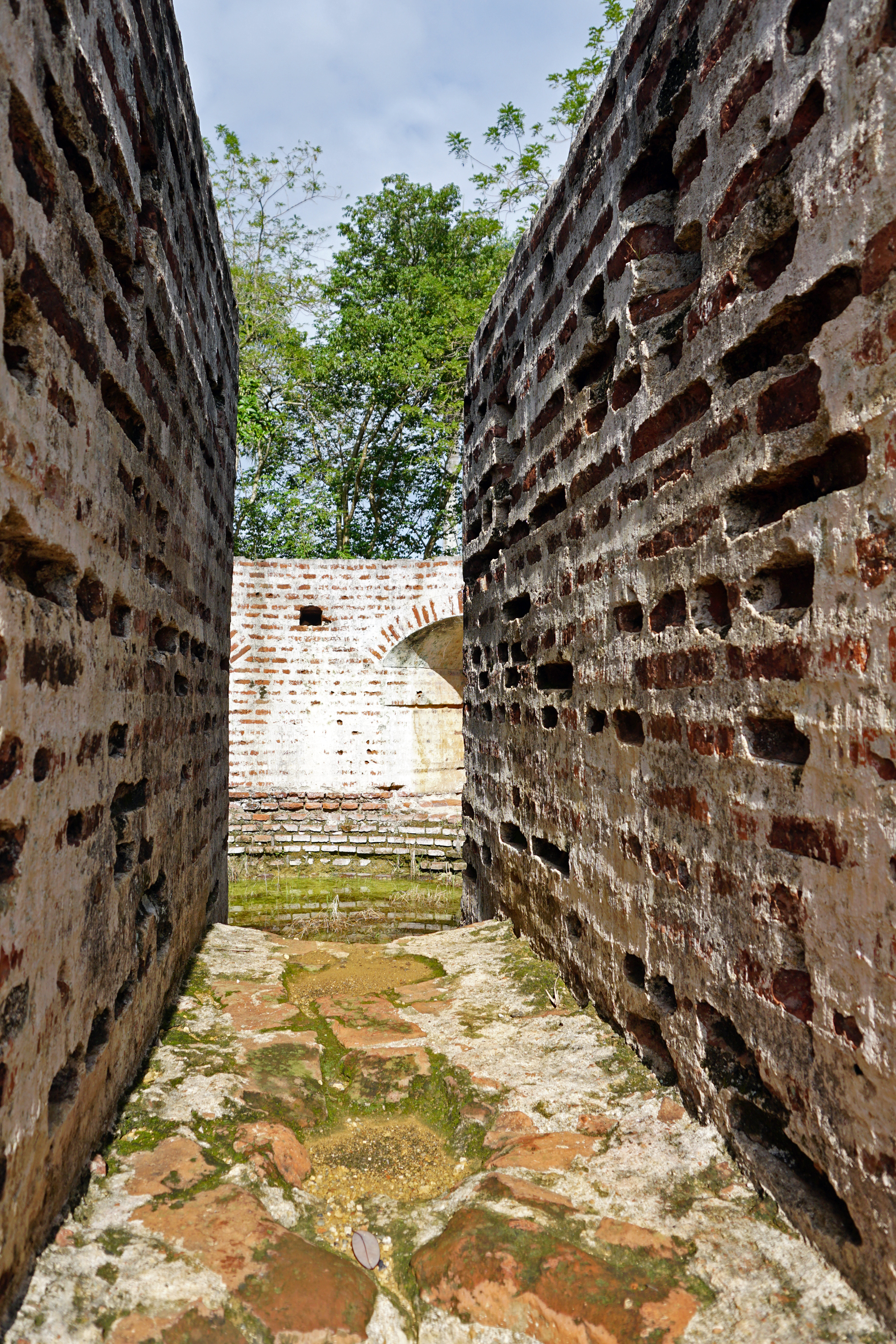

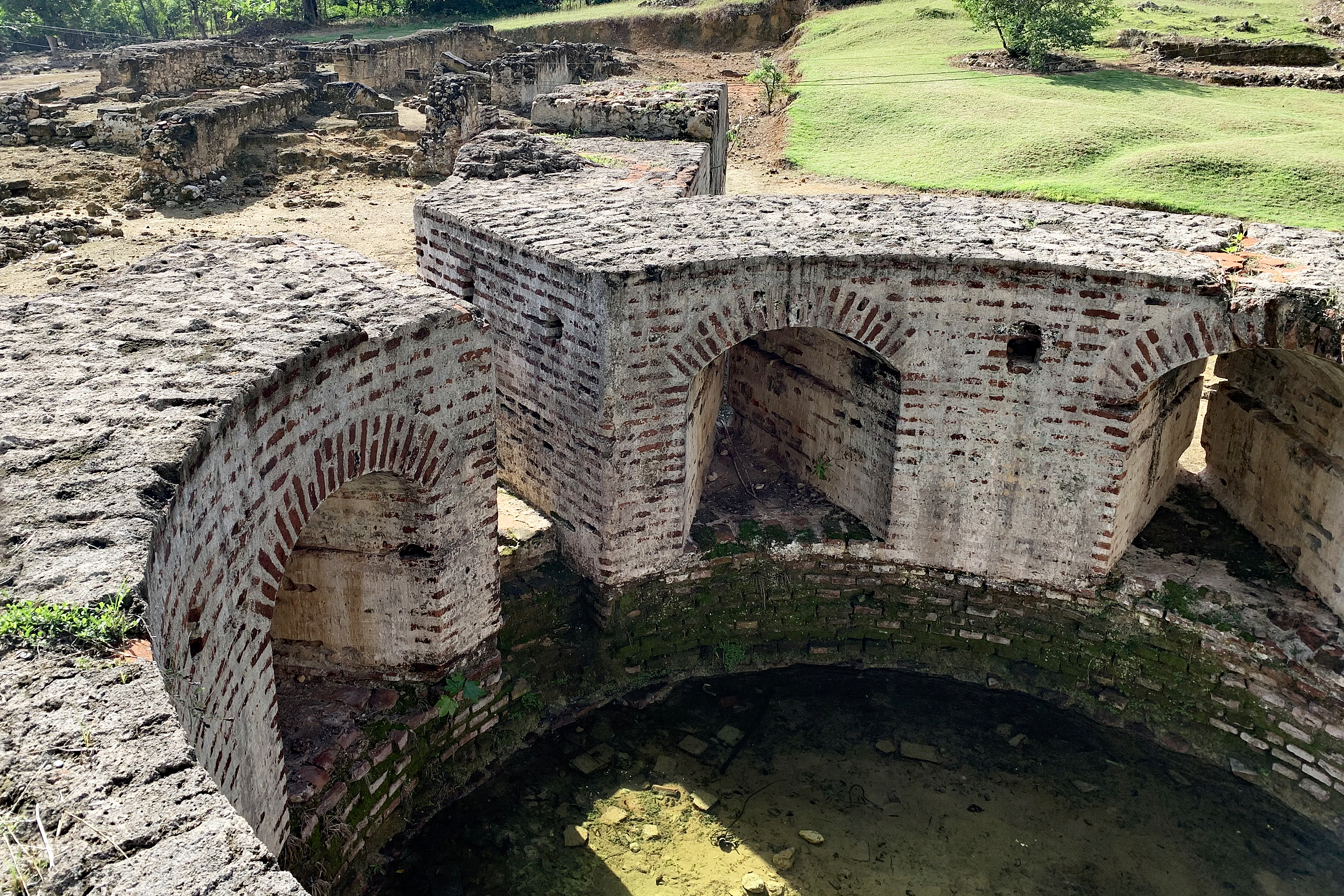

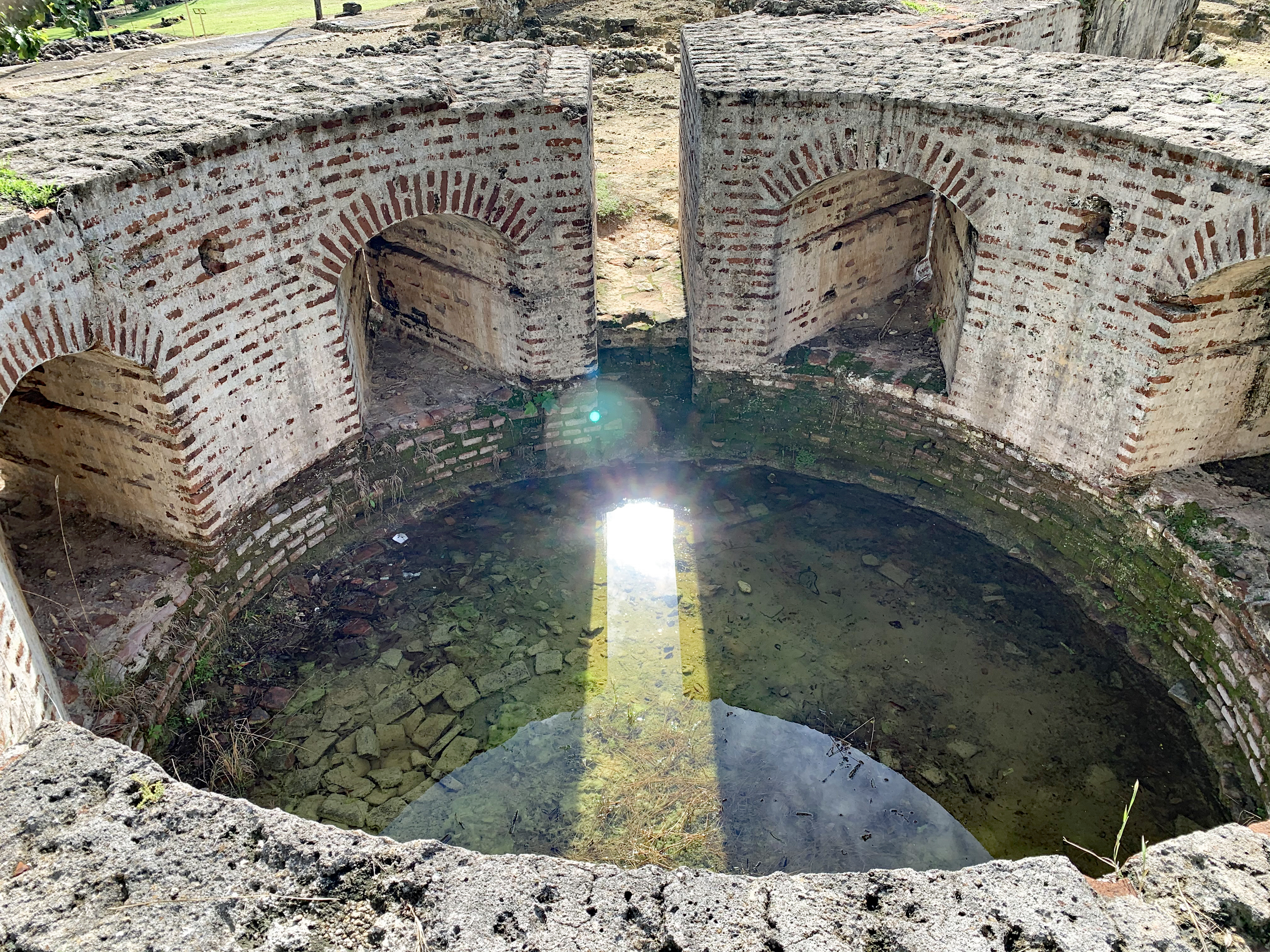

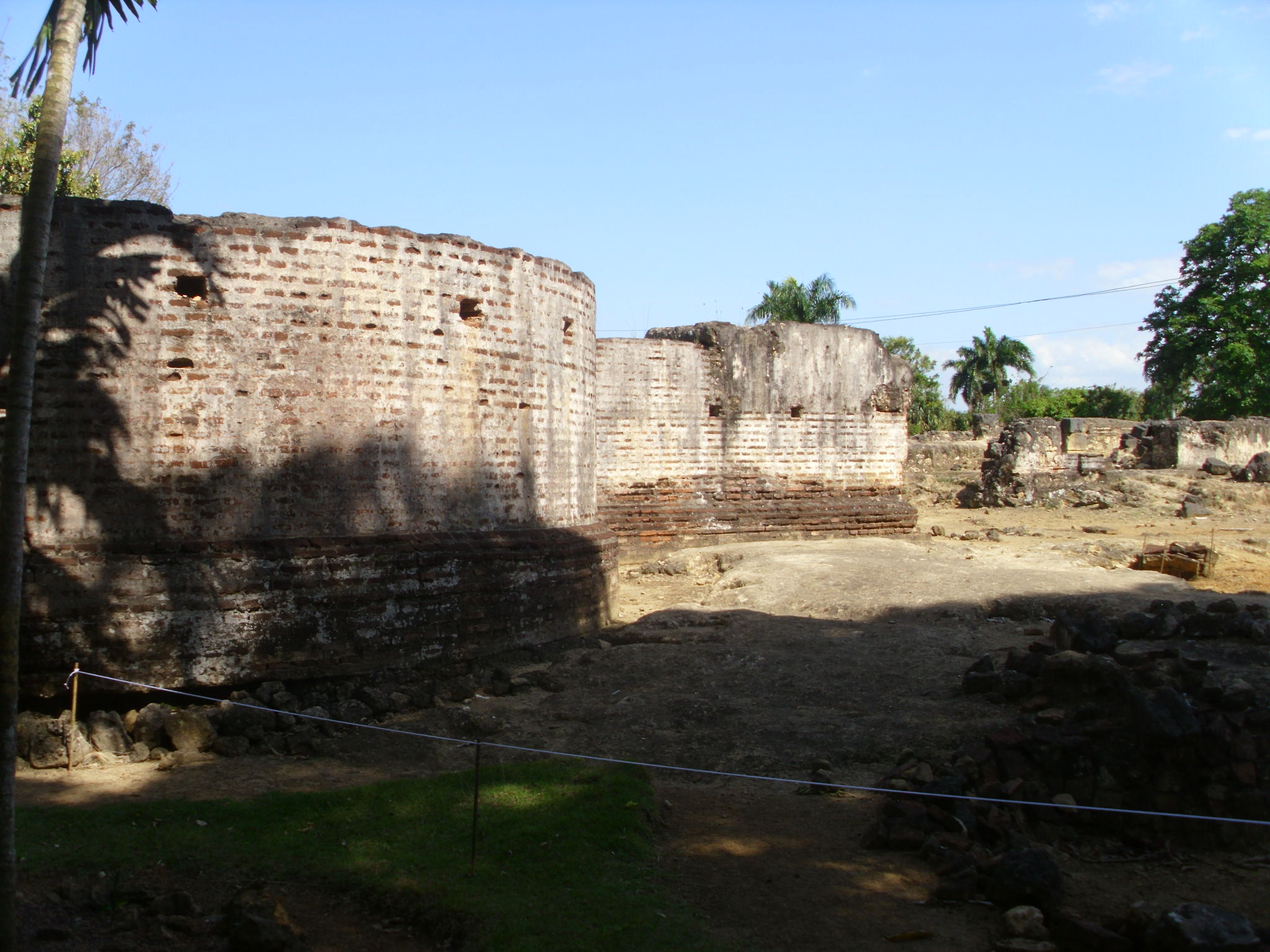

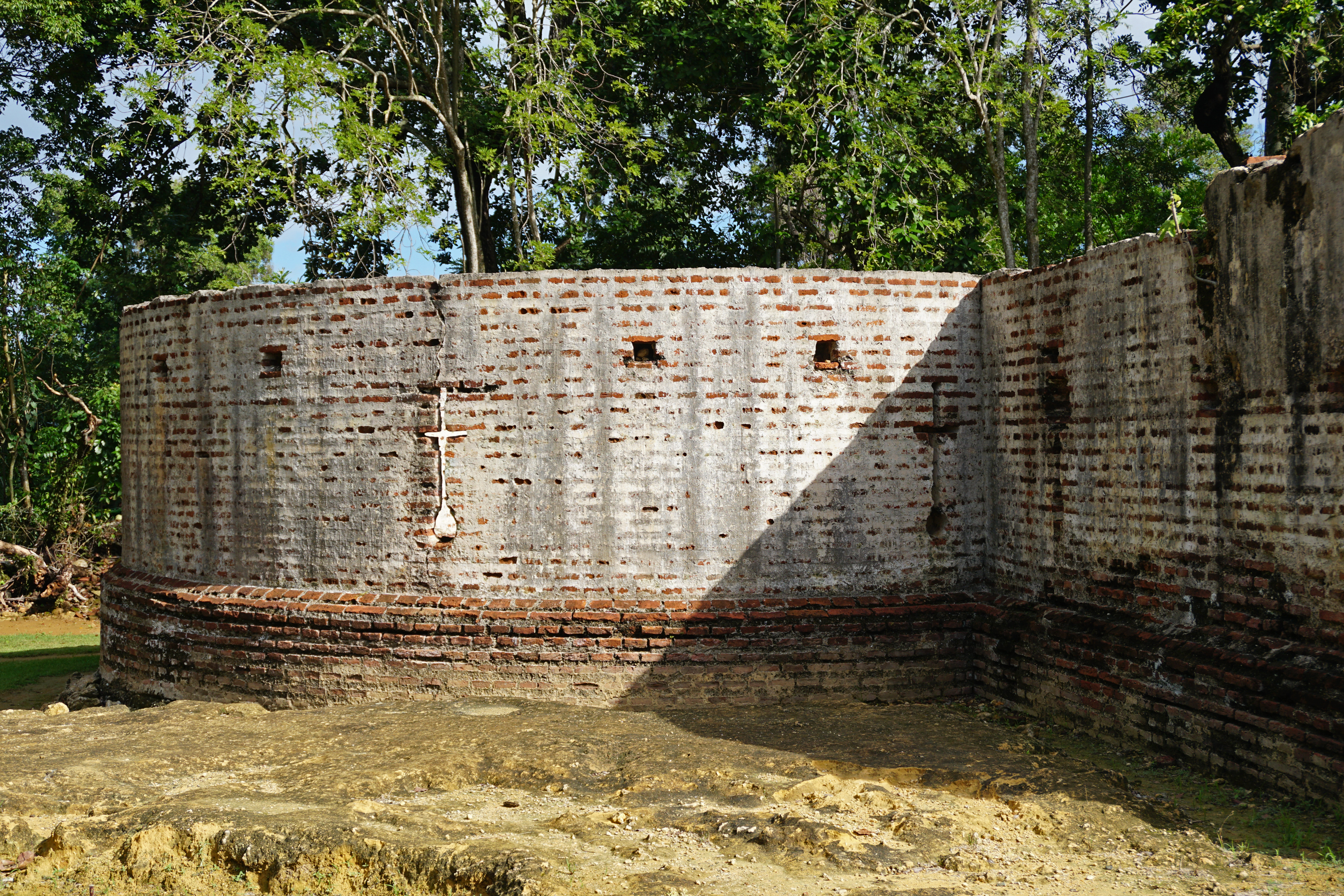
