= Donald Lathrap =

American archaeologist (1927–1990)

Donald Ward Lathrap
- Born: July 4, 1927; California, U.S.
- Died: May 13, 1990 (aged 62); Illinois, U.S.
- Occupations: Archaeologist, Professor

Donald Ward Lathrap (4 July 1927 – 13 May 1990) was an American archaeologist who specialized in the study of Neolithic American culture. He was a professor of anthropology at the University of Illinois at the time of his death.

== Education ==
Lathrap was raised in the area north of Berkeley, California. He graduated from Berkeley High School. In 1950 he received a Bachelor's degree in Anthropology from the University of California, Berkeley, studying under Alfred L. Kroeber and Carl Sauer. While at UCB, Lathrap worked as an assistant archaeologist for the California Archaeological Survey. He published several papers on the archaeology of the California area. He also worked at Berkeley's Lowie Museum of Anthropology (now the Phoebe A. Hearst Museum of Anthropology). This exposure to museum artifacts convinced him that material culture is a valuable source for historical research.

Lathrap left California in 1959, taking a post at the Department of Anthropology at the University of Illinois Urbana-Champaign, where he significantly influenced the department's archaeological direction. He worked in South American archaeology, which focused on the Amazon and Peru. He also researched California and Mid-West archaeology. His orientation was significantly influenced by Sauer's geographical considerations. Much of his early career was marked by his heated disagreements with Betty Meggers over the respective roles of diffusion and local development. Lathrap (1971) proposed that Amazonia was an important center for early Formative pottery, whereas Meggers looked to the Japanese as the inventors of pottery and attributed South American pottery to diffusion from Japan. Lathrap, generally, looked at Amazonia as a source of innovation in South America (197), whereas Meggers looked more to the Andes as the main source of innovation (1972).

Lathrap took graduate studies at Harvard University, where he studied under Gordon Willey. He received a Ph.D. in Anthropology from Harvard in 1962.

== Career ==
In his career Lathrap curated several museum exhibits. His most influential exhibit, "Ancient Ecuador: Culture, Clay and Creativity 3000-300 B.C.," was organized for the Field Museum of Natural History in Chicago and traveled to many major museums (Lathrap et al. 1975). In 1975 he was appointed a research associate with the Department of Anthropology at the Field Museum.

In one of his most recent works, Lathrap and R. C. Troike joined their expertise in California archaeology and linguistics to model the dynamics of West Coast culture history (Lathrap and Troike 1988). Using their understanding of linguistics, they suggested that the West Coast was an important corridor and had been occupied earlier than generally accepted today.

Lathrap was a professor of anthropology at the University of Illinois when he died of an embolism following abdominal surgery in May 1990.

== Bibliography ==
By Lathrap:

- Lathrap, Donald W. 1970 The Upper Amazon. Ancient Peoples and Places, v. 70
- Lathrap, Donald W. 1973 "The Antiquity and Importance of Long-Distance Trade Relationships in the Moist Tropics of Pre-Columbian South America," World Archaeology, 5(2): 170–186
- Lathrap, Donald W. 1975 Ancient Ecuador-culture, clay and creativity, 3000-300 B.C. = El Ecuador antiguo-cultura, cerámica y creatividad, 3000-300 A.C. : [catalogue of an exhibit organized by Field Museum of Natural History, April 18 – August 5, 1975]
- Lathrap, D.W. 1977 "Our Father the Cayman, Our Mother the Gourd: Spinden Revisited, or a Unitary Model for the Emergence of Agriculture in the New World," pp. 713–752 in Origins of Agriculture, edited by C. A. Reed
- Lathrap, Donald; Douglas, Jody; McGregor, John Charles "Variation in anthropology: essays in honor of John C. McGregor", Illinois Archeology Society, 1973

About Lathrap:

- Evans, Clifford and Betty J. Meggers 1964 "Guiana Archaeology: A Return to the Original Interpretations," American Antiquity, 30 (1): 83–84
- Weber, Ronald L. 1996 "Donald Ward Lathrap: 1927–1990," American Antiquity 61 (2): 285
