= List of cassava dishes =

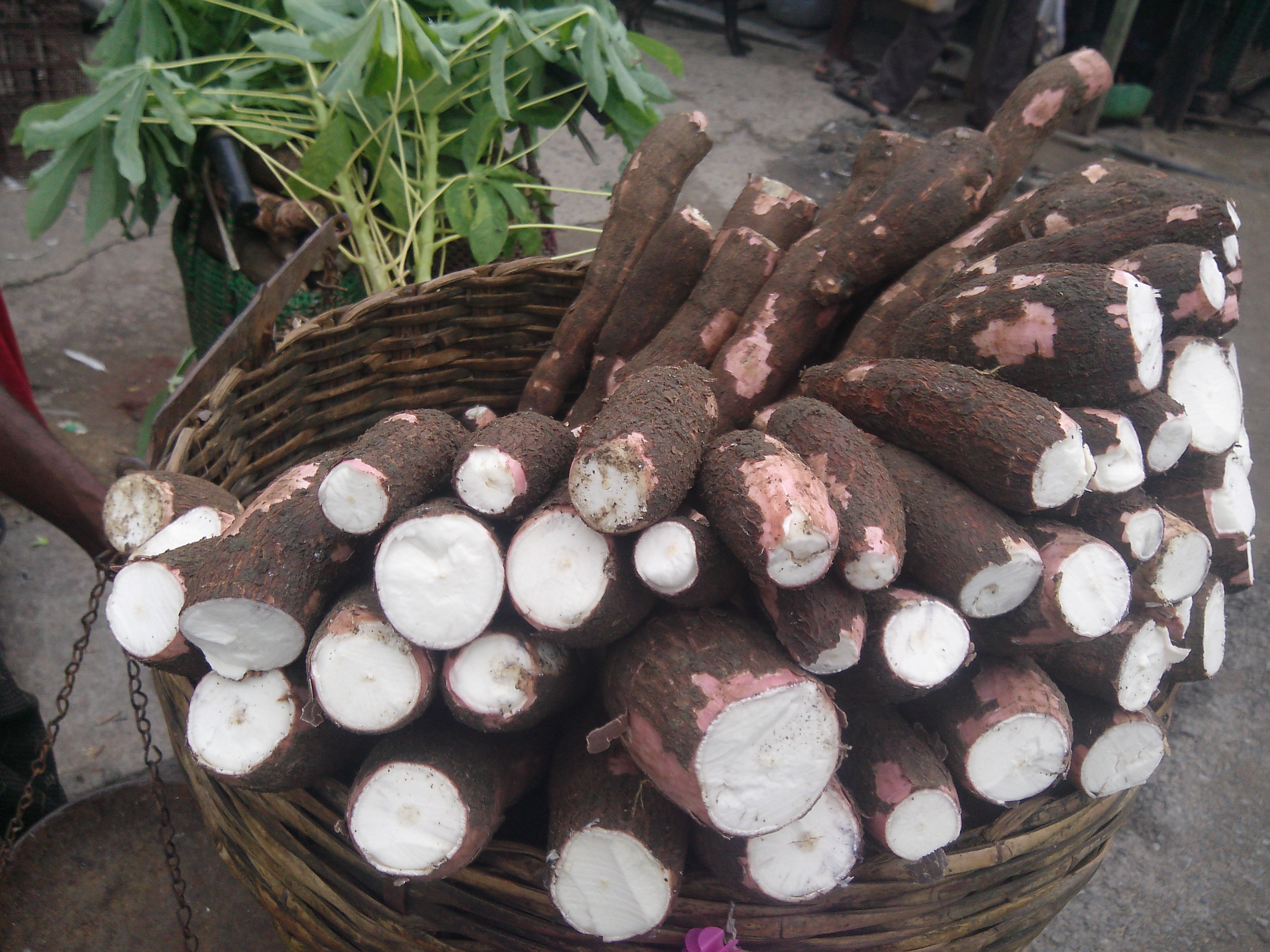
Raw cassava

This is a list of cassava dishes that use cassava as a main ingredient. The cassava is a woody shrub native to South America of the spurge family. It is extensively cultivated as an annual crop in tropical and subtropical regions.

== Cassava dishes ==
Name	Image	Description
Bánh khoai mì		A Vietnamese snack dessert that contains grated cassava
Cassava cake		A dessert from the Philippines and an adaptation of the cooking process of the native bibingka rice cake. It was popularized in the 16th century when Spanish Galleons imported cassava from Latin American countries. It usually contains custard and milk and is usually eaten during merienda or during special occasions.
Coxinha		A popular food in many countries in South America. The drumstick is a Brazilian snack originally from São Paulo made with cassava flour dough filled with chicken or minced beef.
Deep-fried cassava		Fried cassava is a typical substitute for French fries in Brazil, Venezuela, Colombia, and several Central American countries including Panama. It is commonly served in bars along with beer.
Farofa		A toasted cassava flour mixture. In Brazil, where farofa is particularly popular, typical recipes call for raw cassava flour to be toasted with butter, salt, and bacon until golden brown, being incremented with numerous other ingredients. It is an essential accompaniment to feijoada.
Tapioca		A starch extracted from cassava (Manihot esculenta). This species is native to the Northeast of Brazil but spread throughout the South American continent. The plant was spread by Portuguese and Spanish explorers to most of the West Indies, Africa and Asia, including the Philippines and Taiwan, being now cultivated worldwide. In Brazil, the plant (cassava) is named "mandioca", while its starch is called "tapioca".
Sopa de Mandioca		Sopa de Mandioca is a very tasteful soup made from cassava. This delicious soup is consumed by many people and there are some variations in which people add some minced meat, sun dried meat, ribs or just extra condiments.
Cassava Pie		Cassava pie is a traditional Bermudian Christmas dish which is often considered to be a savoury cake rather than pie. Its main ingredients are grated cassava, chicken, butter and sugar.
Kabkab		Also known as "cassava cracker" or "cassava crisp", is a traditional Filipino disc-shaped wafer made from ground cassava. It originates from the southern Philippines, but is most closely associated with the cuisine of Mindanao and the southern Visayas Islands.
Piutu		A traditional Filipino dish that is the staple food of the Sama-Bajau people of the Philippines and the east coast of Sabah. It is made from steamed cassava (panggi) that is mashed and shaped into cylinders. They were traditionally wrapped in banana or palm leaves, but are commonly sold wrapped in clear plastic today. It is typically torn or cut into small disks for eating. It is not flavored and thus need to be eaten with another accompanying dish, usually seafood.
Putong kamotengkahoy		Also known as puto binggala in Visayan and puto a banggala in Maranao. A small cupcake made from cassava, grated coconut, and sugar. It is very similar to cassava cake, except it is steamed rather than baked.
Puto lanson		A traditional steamed cake (puto) from Iloilo, Philippines, made of grated cassava topped with sweetened coconut strips (bukayo)
Kurokud		A type of cassava suman from the Philippines with a filling of sweetened grated coconut (bukayo)
Sumang kamotengkahoy		A type of suman (leaf-wrapped steamed [rice] cake) from the Philippines made from cassava. Usually eaten with coconut caramel (latik). It is also known simply as "cassava suman".
Tapai		A traditional fermented preparation of starchy foods (traditionally rice) in Southeast Asia, used in the process of making sweet-sour edible pastes or alcoholic drinks. Widespread variants, like the Indonesian peuyeum, have used cassava as the starch source since colonial times.

== See also ==
- Cassava-based dishes
