= Cassareep =

Seasoning made from cassava root

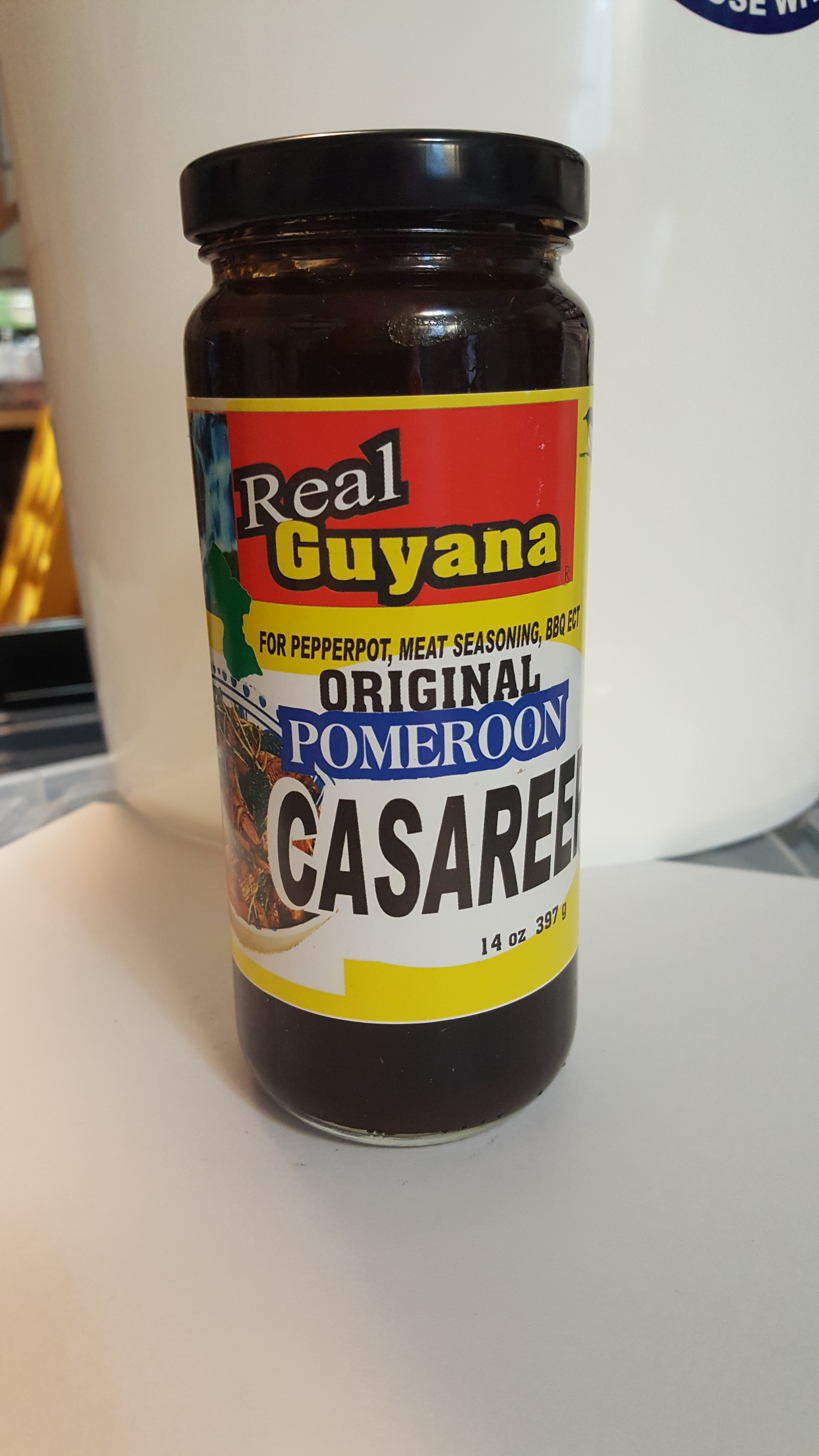
A jar of commercially produced cassareep sold in the US.

Cassareep is a seasoning made from cassava root, often with additional spices, which is used as a base for many sauces and especially in Guyanese pepperpot. Besides use as a flavoring and browning agent, it is commonly regarded as a food preservative, although laboratory testing is inconclusive.

== Production ==
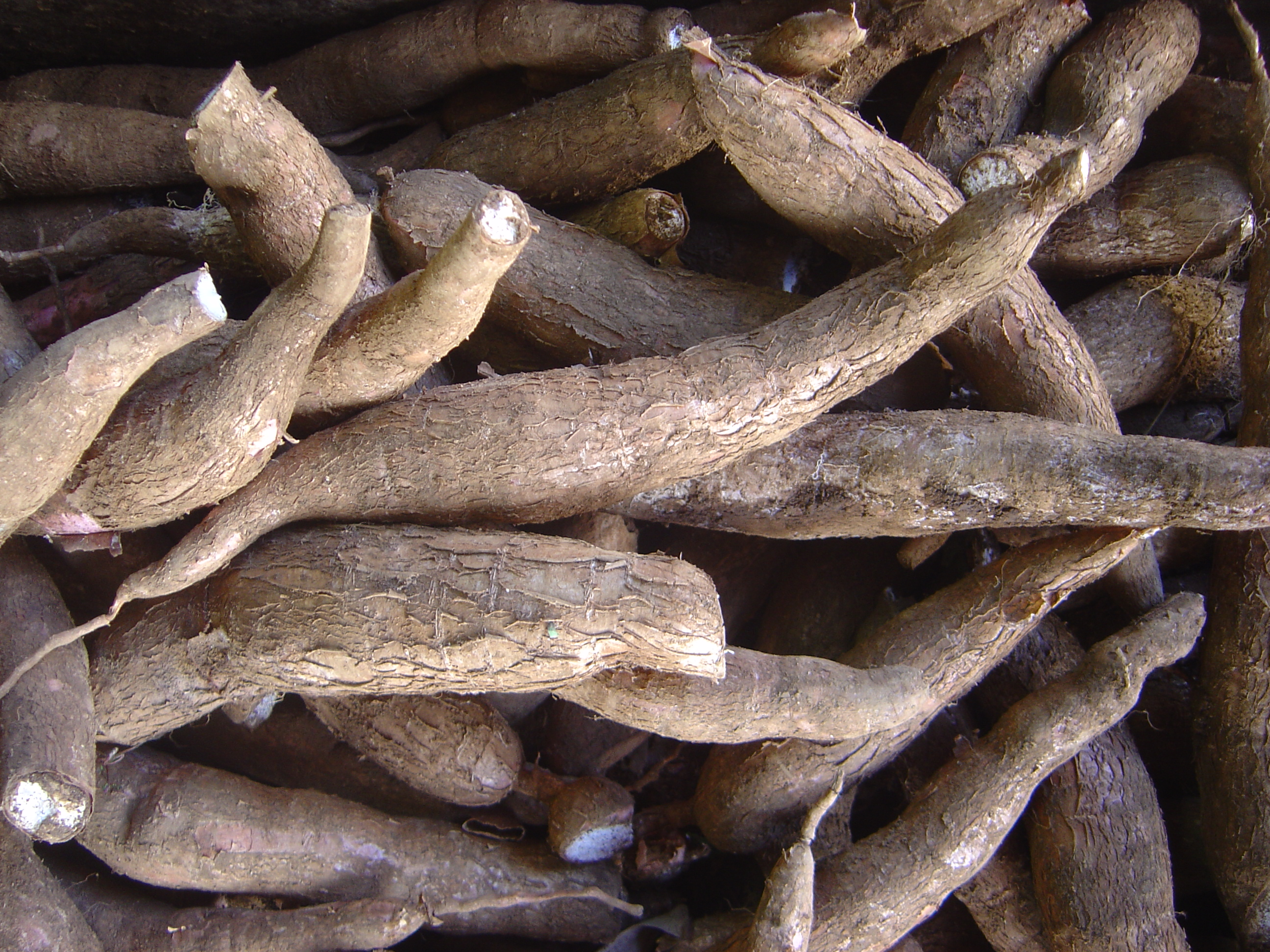
Cassava roots

Cassareep is made from the juice of the bitter cassava root, which is poisonous, as it contains acetone cyanohydrin, a compound which decomposes to the highly toxic hydrogen cyanide on contact with water. Hydrogen cyanide, traditionally called "prussic acid", is volatile and quickly dissipates when heated. Nevertheless, improperly cooked cassava has been blamed for a number of deaths. Indigenous peoples in Guyana reportedly made an antidote by steeping chili peppers in rum.

To make cassareep, the juice is boiled until it is reduced by half in volume, to the consistency of molasses and flavored with spices—including cloves, cinnamon, salt, sugar, and cayenne pepper. Traditionally, cassareep was boiled in a soft pot, the actual "pepper pot", which would absorb the flavors and also impart them (even if dry) to any foods cooked in it, such as rice and chicken.

Most cassareep is exported from Guyana. The natives of Guyana traditionally brought the product to town in bottles, and it is available on the US market in bottled form. Although the cassava root itself traveled from Brazil to Africa, where the majority of cassava is grown, cassareep as such is not produced in Africa.

== Culinary use ==
Cassareep is essential in the preparation of pepperpot, and gives the dish its "distinctive bittersweet flavor". Cassareep can also be used as an added flavoring to dishes, "imparting upon them the richness and flavour of strong beef-soup".

A peculiar quality of cassareep, which works as an antiseptic, is that it allows food to be kept "on the back of the stove" for indefinite lengths of time, as long as additional cassareep is added every time meat is added. According to legend, Betty Mascoll of Grenada had a pepperpot that was maintained like this for more than a century. Dutch planters in Suriname reportedly had pepperpots in daily use that they kept cooking for many years, as did "businessmen's clubs" in the Caribbean.

== Medical application ==
The antiseptic qualities of cassareep are well known. The Reverend J.G. Wood, who published his Wanderings in South America in 1879, was criticized for not mentioning the "antiseptic properties of cassava juice (cassareep), which enables the Indian on a canoe voyage to take with him a supply of meat for several days".

In the mid- to late 19th century, as reports of adventures by English explorers became widely read in England, statements about cassareep and its antiseptic qualities became easily available. An early example was a publication in The Pharmaceutical Journal from 1847, and similar references can be found throughout the late 19th century, such as in the work of Irish naturalist and explorer Thomas Heazle Parke and in pharmaceutical and trade journals.

In the 1870 edition of the Year-book of Pharmacy, Professor Attfield, professor of practical chemistry for the Royal Pharmaceutical Society of Great Britain, claimed, however, that his laboratory studies proved no effectiveness whatsoever.

Even so, pharmaceutical journals and handbooks began to report of the possible use of cassareep, and suggested it might be helpful in the treatment of, for instance, eye afflictions such as corneal ulcers and conjunctivitis.

== Bibliography ==
- Harris, Dunstan A. (2003). Island Cooking: Recipes from the Caribbean. Ten Speed Press. p. 138. ISBN 978-1-58008-501-4. Cassareep recipe.
