= CubaSolar =

Cuban NGO which promotes solar energy

CubaSolar, officially the Cuban Society for the Promotion of Renewable Energy Sources and Environmental Respect (Spanish: Sociedad Cubana para la Promoción de las Energías Renovables y el Respeto Ambiental), is a Cuban non-governmental organization established in 1994. It promotes the use of renewable energy technology.

== History ==
During Cuba's Special Period, the country experienced economic contraction following the dissolution of the Soviet Union. After the Council for Mutual Economic Assistance disintegrated, Cuba's a lack of oil supplies hampered Cuba's energy sector. In 1994, CubaSolar was established during this energy crisis to bring together engineers, scientists, and planners to develop alternative energy capacity. It seeks to promote solar energy, biogas, hydropower, and solar thermal energy.

== Renewable energy activities ==
CubaSolar is a non-governmental organization which is funded by the Cuban government and foreign partners on a project-by-project basis. The organization has over 1,000 members and branches in every Cuban province.

It has installed solar power for over 500 medical clinics, rural hospitals, and farmers' homes. CubaSolar trains technical brigades to install hybrid wind-diesel systems, hybrid photovoltaic wind technologies, wind farms, and hydropower infrastructure in remote communities.

CubaSolar also works on technology transfer to Bolivia, Chile, Ecuador, Guatemala, Guinea Bissau, Haiti, Honduras, Mali, Mexico, Nicaragua, Peru, South Africa, and Venezuela.

CubaSolar has participated in projects to mitigate desertification. It has built greenhouses for research on seed cultivation.

== Educational activities ==
As part of its educational function, CubaSolar publishes books as well as two magazines which are provided to every Cuban school. It publishes Energía y Tú for a general readership. For a scientific readership, it publishes EcoSolar.

In a series of article in Energía y Tú, CubaSolar President Luis Bérriz articulated the view that the dispersed quality of solar energy makes it an important socialist and anti-imperialist tool. In this view, the material form of solar energy technology means that it cannot be dominated by the rich because "the Sun cannot be blockaded, it cannot be dominated, it cannot be destroyed."

In Granma Province, CubaSolar has established an Educators' Villa which hosts events as well as the Solar Study Centre for both student education and teacher training.
