= Cassava-based dishes =

Foods prepared with cassava

Many cassava-based dishes are consumed in the regions where cassava (Manihot esculenta, also called 'manioc' or 'yuca') is cultivated. Manihot esculenta is a woody shrub of the spurge family, Euphorbiaceae, native to South America, from Brazil, Paraguay and parts of the Andes.

As a food ingredient, cassava root is somewhat similar to the potato in that it is starchy and bland in flavor when cooked. Cassava can be prepared in similar ways to potato; it can be boiled, mashed, fried or baked. Unlike the potato, however, cassava is mostly a tropical crop, and its peculiar characteristics have led to recipes, such as sweet puddings, which have no common potato version.

In some parts of the world (chiefly in Africa and some Southeast Asian nations like Indonesia, Malaysia and the Philippines), cassava leaves are also cooked and eaten as a vegetable.

Raw cassava, especially the bitter variety, contains cyanogenic glycosides and normally must be cooked before eating or turned into a stable intermediate product through a series of processes to reduce the toxins in the cassava to a level safe for human consumption. The typical process in West Africa and Central America includes peeling, mashing, fermenting, sun-drying and toasting. Popular intermediate products obtained from processing cassava tubers include garri, tapioca and cassava flour.

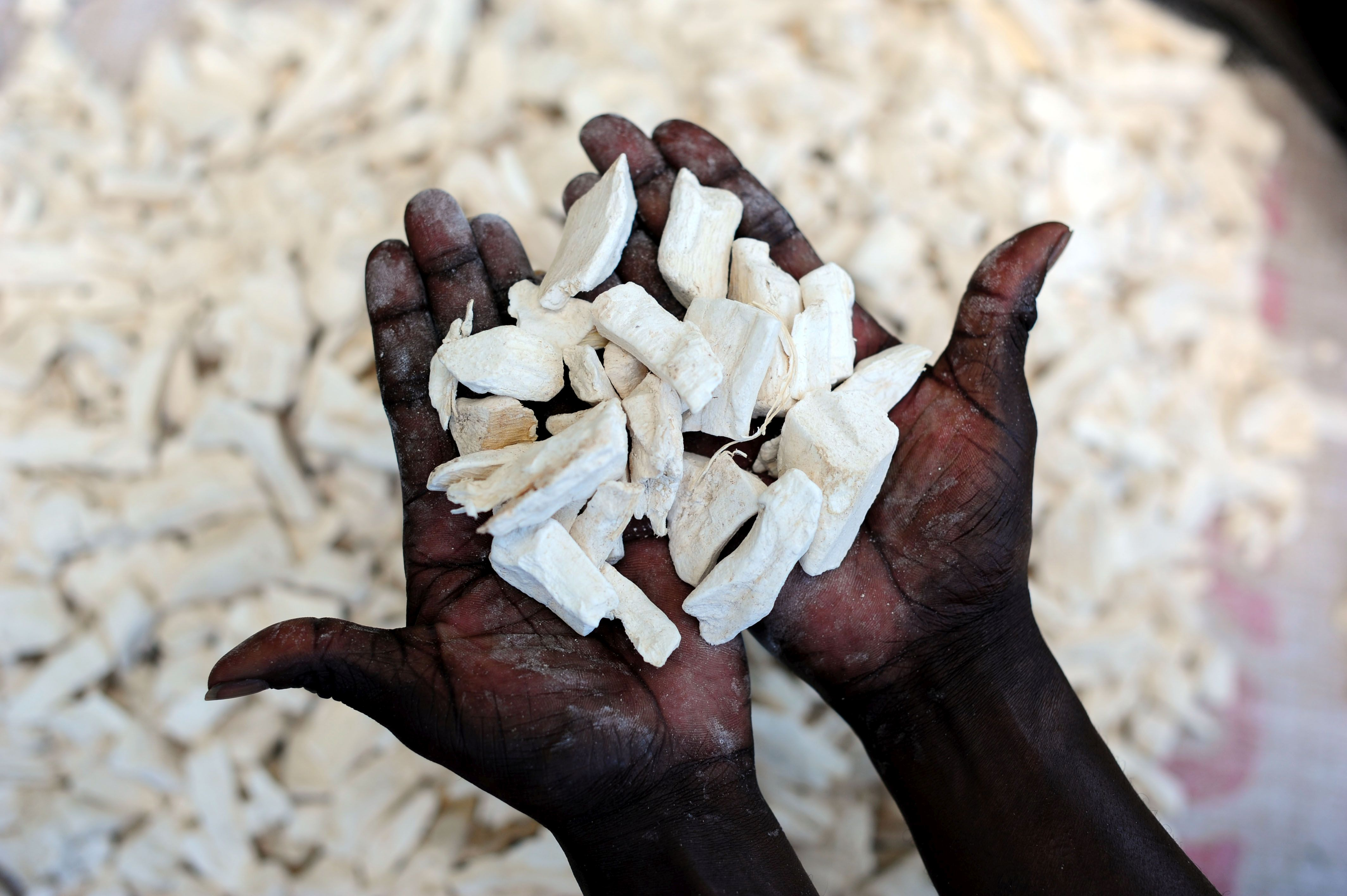
Cassava chips

== Caribbean ==
In many Caribbean islands, cassava flour is made into a round-shaped flat bread called casabe or "cassava bread".

=== Cuba ===
Cassava is a staple of Cuban cuisine. Besides casabe bread, it is prepared as a side dish: boiled, then covered with raw onion rings and sizzling garlic-infused olive oil. It is also boiled, then cut into strips and fried to make yuca frita (similar to French fries). Yuca is also one of the main ingredients in ajiaco, a traditional Cuban stew, along with potatoes, malanga, boniato (sweet potato), plantain, ñame, corn and other vegetables. Cuban buñuelos, a local variation of a traditional Spanish fritter (similar to the French beignet), are made with cassava and sweet potato instead of flour. These are fried and topped off with anisette-flavored sugar syrup. Yuca chips, "chicharritas de yuca", are often consumed as a side dish or a snack. These chips are deep-fried thin rings of the root.

Traditional Cuban churros were historically prepared with yuca paste and that is the way they are still made in most Cuban households; however, most churro-making street carts and cafeterias in the island and in Miami use yuca flour to create the dough nowadays.

=== Haiti ===
Cassava (Haitian Creole: kasav) (French: Cassave) is a popular starch and common staple in Haiti, where it is often eaten as part of a meal or occasionally by itself. It is usually eaten in bread form, often with peanut butter spread on the top or with milk. Cassava flour, known as musa or moussa, is boiled to create a meal of the same name. Cassava can also be eaten with various stews and soups, such as the traditional pumpkin soup referred to as soup joumou. Cassava flour is also used to make a Haitian cookie called bonbon lamindon. The root vegetable yuca is grated, rinsed well, dried, salted, and pressed to form flat cakes about 4 inches (10 cm) in diameter and 1/2 inch (1 cm) thick.

=== Dominican Republic ===
As an alternative to side dishes like French fries, arepitas de yuca are consumed, which are deep-fried buttered lumps of shredded cassava with egg and anis. Bollitos, similar to carimañola in Colombia and Panama, are also made. Empanada called catibía has its dough made out of water, oil, cassava flour or boiled mashed cassava. Peeled, boiled and eaten with pickled onions, mojo or other root vegetables like potatoes, ñame, yams, batata (sweet potatoes) and yautía (dasheen). Cassava is used to make chulos, mainly in the Cibao region: grated cassava and are shaped into a cylindrical form, much like a croquette, stuffed with meat or cheese and fried. Cassava is an important ingredient for sancocho.

=== Puerto Rico ===
The root, in its boiled and peeled form, is present in the typical Puerto Rican stew, the sancocho, together with plantains, potatoes, yautía, among other vegetables (it can also be eaten singly as an alternative to boiled potatoes or plantains). It can be ground and used as a paste (masa) to make a typically Puerto Rican Christmas dish called pasteles or hallaca. These are similar to Mexican tamales in appearance but are made with root vegetables, plantains, or yuca instead of corn. Pasteles are rectangular and have a meat filling in the center, usually chicken or pork. They are wrapped in a plantain leaf. Empanadas are known as pastelitos except when made with cassava masa. The empanada is popular among beach side and filled with crab, shrimp, octopus and other meats. Guanimes are also smilier to tamales; they are made with yuca or plantains mashed with corn meal, wrapped in banana leaf and are shape like a log. Masa made from cassava mixed with yautía root is also used for alcapurrias. These are filled with meat or seafood similar to pasteles but are fried instead. Yuca in Puerto Rico is also fried, smashed with garlic, olive oil, broth and then stuffed with chicharrón or bacon to make mofongo de yuca. Casabe bread also is a traditional food made from yuca, but is no longer very commonly eaten. Casaba bread can come in many different flavors such as garlic and cheese or a sweeter version with sugar, cheese and bits of coconut meat. Escabeche de yuca, cassava and chicken gizzards pickled in a garlicky brine with onions and olives. Serernata de Bacalao, salted cod fish mixed with cassava and other tropical root vegetables, green bananas, cabbage, chayote, hard boiled eggs, and avocado. Rusiao de yuca like pasteles are made from grated cassava that has been dehydrated, toasted, then notably rehydrate with coconut milk into masa and seasoned with anis, mashed or finely chopped chicharrón, oregano among other ingredients. They are then wrapped in banana leaf and grilled. Rellenos de yuca are fitters made with boiled mashed cassava, milk, eggs, cornstarch, butter, and filled with meat, cheese, seafood, or vegetable and fried. Pastelillos de yuca are basically empanadas made with tapioca, milk, butter or lard, annatto, eggs, vinegar or vodka.

Cassava is also used in sweets. Cazuela a pie made with yuca, squash, sweet potato, coconut and other ingredients. Spiced cookies called alfajor made from cassava are sold all over the island and very popular during the Christmas season. Flan a popular custard in Latin American is also prepared with cassava in some regions on the island. Tortilla de yuca is a sweet bread like dessert with cassava, coconut milk, spices, ginger, raisins, and vanilla. Churros were once a popular snack brought over by the Spanish. In Puerto Rico churros were traditionally made with flour, cassava, sugar, cinnamon, vanilla, and egg.

=== Jamaica ===
In Jamaica, cassava is traditionally made into bammy, a small fried cassava cake inherited from the native Arawak Indians. The cassava root is grated, rinsed well, dried, salted, and pressed to form flat cakes about 4 inches (10 cm) in diameter and 1/2 inch (1 cm) thick. The cakes are baked until firm and can be stored for a long time if properly done. These can be prepared by dipping in coconut milk, water or regular milk and fried. Bammies are usually served as a starchy side dish with breakfast, with fish dishes or alone as a snack. Finely grated cassava is also added to European-style pancakes, replacing part of the wheat flour.

Bammy cakes are used to serve fried fish at roadside stands (similar to taco shells, although the flavor is nothing like corn or flour taco shells.) These cakes are made from grated bitter cassava (Manihot utilissima Pohl) root which has been carefully processed to remove toxic compounds. The grated cassava is rinsed and pressed through woven "bammy bags" (the runoff of which contains cyanide and is very toxic to humans and livestock) and fried into flat round "cakes". The sweet cassava root, M. esculenta subspecies flabellifolia, is boiled and used like potatoes in stews. (This observation is based on Farming Systems Research conducted in Jamaica in 1990 under the auspices of the Jamaican Agricultural Development Foundation and the University of Florida in Gainesville.)

=== The Bahamas and Turks and Caicos Islands ===
In The Bahamas and the Turks and Caicos Islands, cassava is made into a bread, or is eaten boiled, either alone or with sweet potatoes, cabbage, plantains, and meat. Alternatively, it is cooked in soups with okra or with dumplings, or sometimes made as a cake.

=== Dominica ===
The native Kalinago people of Dominica rely on cassava as a staple crop. Traditional "bread" is made by grinding cassava root, blending it with water (and sometimes coconut shavings) and frying it on large solid metal grills. Cassava bread cooked in this fashion is tough and chewy and can be used for wraps or sandwiches. It is most often eaten by itself. The Caribs have multiple small stations along Dominica's main highway where locals cook cassava bread in open-air kitchens for onlookers and tourists.

=== Trinidad and Tobago ===
In Trinidad and Tobago and other islands in the eastern and southern Caribbean, cassava is traditionally peeled, boiled, and served with flour dumplings and other root vegetables such as potatoes, yams, sweet potatoes and dasheen. It is also stir-fried with other root vegetables and onions, coconut milk, and either salt fish or smoked herring to create a dish commonly called "Oil-down". A form of cassava bread called cassava pone is also found in Trinidad and Tobago, which was adopted from the cuisine of the local Amerindian tribe.

=== Bermuda ===
Cassava pie is a traditional Christmas dish in Bermuda. The cassava is normally bought frozen, washed through a cotton cloth, squeezed dry, then mixed with egg, butter, nutmeg, cinnamon, vanilla and sugar. It is either layered in a baking dish in alternate layers with chicken or pork, or cassava alone. It is then baked in the oven for a few hours to kill the toxins. It is eaten as a savoury dish alongside other traditional Christmas fare, such as roast turkey and baked ham. It is often available year-round cooked at most supermarket lunch delis.

=== Garifuna ===
Among the Garifuna, cassava bread (ereba) is prepared in an ancient and time-consuming process involving a long, snake-like woven basket (ruguma) which strains the cassava of its juice. It is then dried overnight and later sieved through flat rounded baskets (hibise) to form flour that is baked into pancakes on a large iron griddle. Ereba is eaten with fish, hudutu (pounded green and ripe plantains) or alone with gravy (lasusu).

== Central America ==
=== Belize ===
In Belize, cassava is traditionally made into bammy, a small fried cassava cake inherited from the Garifuna. The bile up (or boil up) is considered the cultural dish of the Kriols. It is a combination of boiled eggs, fish or pig tail, with a number of ground foods such as cassava, green plantains, yams, sweet potatoes, and tomato sauce. The cassava root is grated, rinsed well, salted, and pressed to form flat cakes about 4 inches (10 cm) in diameter and 1/2 inch (1 cm) thick. The cakes are lightly fried, then dipped in coconut milk and fried again. Bammies are usually served as a starchy side dish with breakfast, with fish dishes, or alone as a snack. Cassava pone is a traditional Kriol and pan-West Indian dessert recipe for a cassava flour cake sometimes made with coconuts and raisins.

=== Costa Rica ===
In Costa Rica, cassava is widely used, either boiled in soups or fried and served with pieces of fried pork and lime, the latter often sold as a snack. When travelling by bus, the bus is often boarded by a local trying to sell snacks of yuca, pork and lime. Two main sources of food for locals in rural areas, living off resources within their own land, are yuca and plantain.

=== El Salvador ===
In El Salvador, cassava is used in soups, or fried. Yuca frita con chicharrón is deep-fried yuca and served with curtido (a pickled cabbage, onion and carrot topping) and pork rinds or pepesquitas (fried baby sardines). The cassava is sometimes served boiled instead of fried. Cassava is also used in nuegados (a fried or baked patty made of grated cassava and served with sugar cane syrup).

=== Guatemala ===
In Guatemala, cassava can be served as a side dish to a meal, mostly with soups; however, it is not a staple food in Guatemala. There are many typical cassava dishes, such as yuca con chicharrón (fried pig skin and boiled cassava) and platano con yuca (green or ripe plantains mashed together with boiled cassava).

=== Honduras ===
In Honduras, cassava is used in a variety of soups and other dishes. Cassava is one of the main ingredients in sopa de caracol (conch soup). Another typical Honduran dish is yuca con chicharrón, which is served with lemon-dripped raw cabbage and diced tomatoes, topped with chicharrones (pork rinds).

=== Nicaragua ===
In Nicaragua, cassava is used in soups and in the Nicaraguan typical dish vigorón, which basically consists of boiled cassava, chicharrón, and cabbage salad. Cassava is also used to make buñuelos and is one of the main ingredients in the national dish vaho.

=== Panama ===
In Panama, cassava is sometimes used to make carimanolas. Boiled cassava is mashed into a dough and then filled with spiced meat. The meat-filled dumplings are deep fried to a golden brown. It is also used in brothy soups together with chicken, potatoes, and other vegetables.

== South America ==
=== Argentina ===
In Argentina mandioca is very popular in the northern provinces of Corrientes, Misiones and Formosa, where it is typically eaten boiled or fried.

=== Bolivia ===
Cassava is very popular in Bolivia (especially in Santa Cruz, Beni and Pando) and is consumed in a variety of dishes. It is common, after boiling it, to fry it with oil and eat it with a special hot sauce known as llajwa or with cheese and choclo (dried corn). In the Bolivian east, it is also prepared as a dough mixed with cheese that then "envelops" a stick to be grilled. This dish is known as "zonzo".

In warm and rural areas, cassava is used as a substitute for bread in everyday meals. The capacity of cassava to be stored for a long time makes it suitable as an ideal and cheap reserve of nutrients. Recently, more restaurants, hotels and common people are including cassava into their original recipes and everyday meals as a substitute for potato and bread.

=== Brazil ===
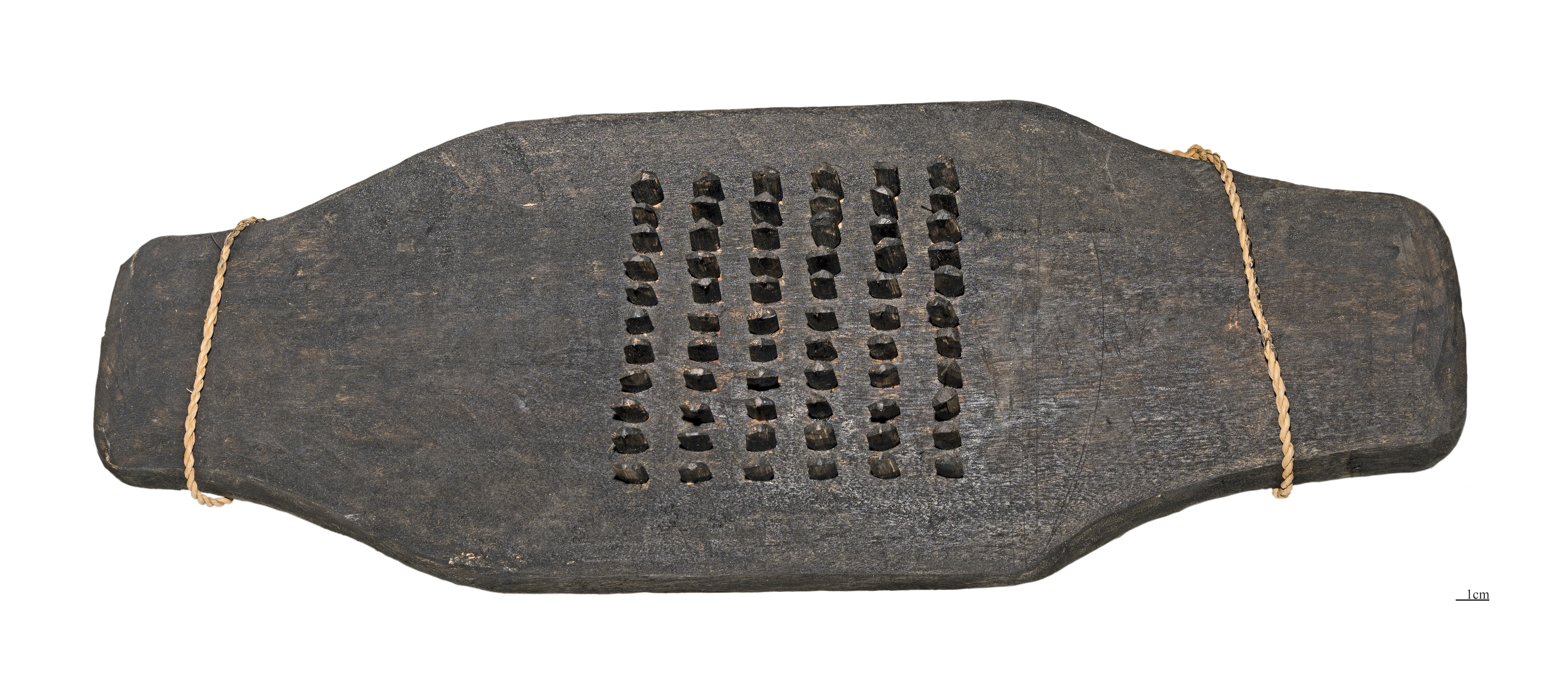
Cassava grater from the Karajá people, MHNT

Cassava is heavily featured in the Brazilian cuisine. In the guise of farofa (lightly roasted flour) cassava is often combined with rice and beans as a topping. Farofa is also a frequent side dish to many Brazilian foods including the national dish feijoada, a salted-pork and black-beans stew. The dish vaca atolada ("mud-stranded cow") is a meat and cassava stew, cooked until the root has turned into a paste. Pirão is a thick gravy-like gruel prepared by thickening seasoned fish stock (made from fish heads and bones) with cassava flour. Boiled cassava is also made into a popular sweet pudding or "cassava cake". After boiling, cassava may also be deep-fried to form a snack or side dish.

The Brazilian dish tapioca is a crepe-like food made with granulated cassava starch (also called tapioca ), the starch is moistened, strained through a sieve to make a coarse flour, then sprinkled onto a hot griddle or pan, where the heat makes the starchy grains fuse into a tortilla, which is often sprinkled with coconut. Then it may be buttered and eaten as a toast (its most common use is as a breakfast dish), or it may be filled or topped with either doces (sweet) or salgados (salty) ingredients, which define the kind of meal the tapioca is used for: breakfast, afternoon tea or dessert. Choices range from butter, cheese, chocolate, bananas with condensed milk, chocolate with bananas, to various forms of meats.

Couac is a more or less dry coarse semolina that ranges in color from bright yellow to gray to white. It is traditionally made from bitter cassava varieties.

In Brazil and Portugal, a crunchy meal called farinha de mandioca (Portuguese pronunciation: [faˈɾĩɲɐ dʒi mɐ̃diˈɔkɐ], "manioc flour") of varying coarseness is produced for use as a condiment, a base for farofa, or a stand-alone side dish. Detoxified manioc roots are ground to a pulp called a massa and squeezed with a device called a tipiti to dry it out (the liquid produced by this may be collected and settled to produce cassava starch, also known as tapioca or locally known as polvilho). The dried massa is then dried over a large copper stove to produce the dried meal. This process varies regionally and by manioc species, and may include additional steps of re-soaking, re-drying and toasting the flour. Manioc agriculture and refinement to farinha is a major economic activity in the Western Amazon.

Farinha de mandioca and tapioca are the most important caloric staples of the Indigenous peoples of Brazil who already practiced agriculture when Europeans colonized the country, so for Brazilians manioc would be included in its equivalent of the North American three sister crops or the Mesoamerican milpa.

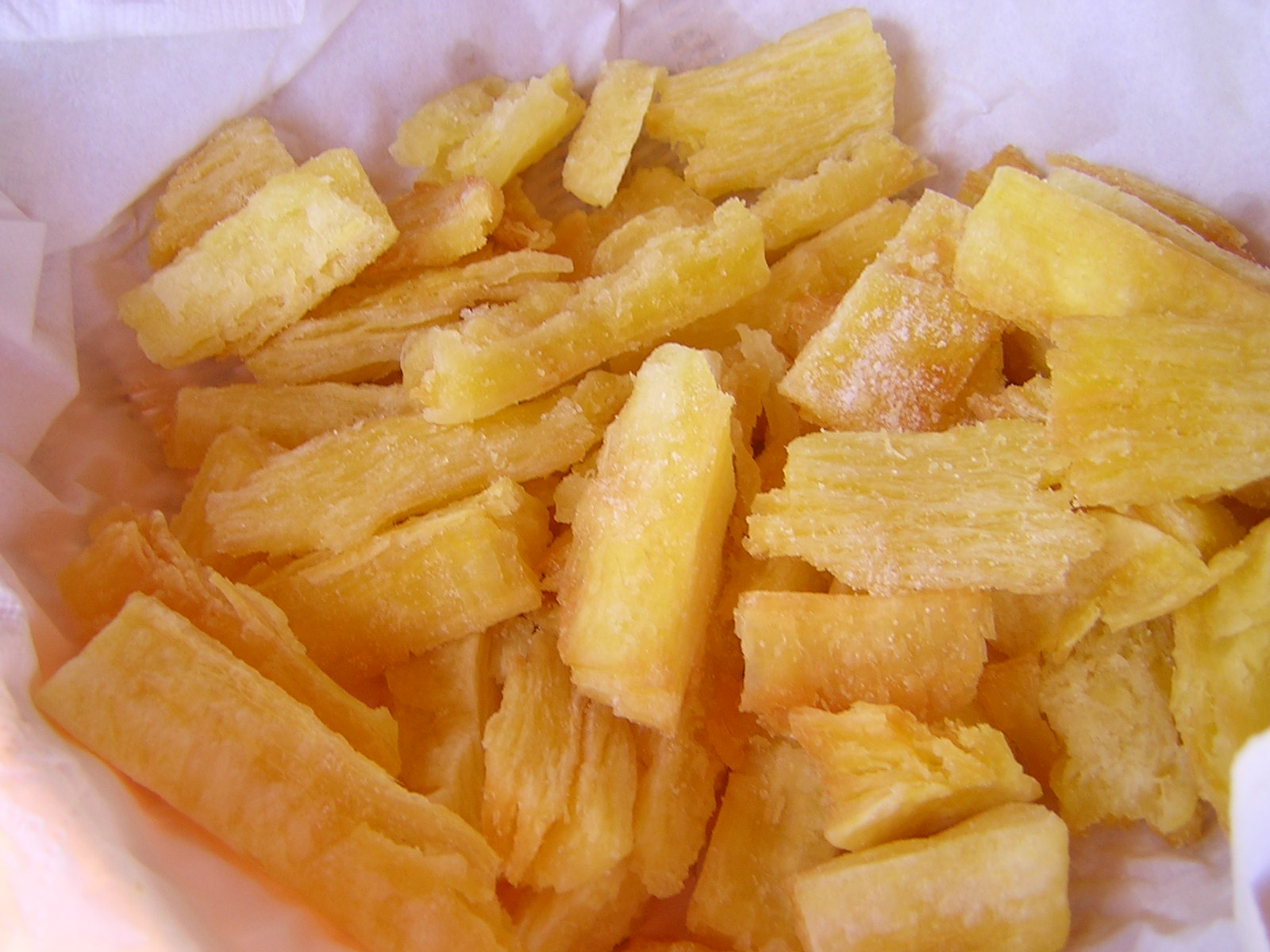
Fried and salted cassava

Fried cassava is a common snack food in Brazil, Venezuela, Colombia, Ecuador, and several Central American countries including Panama. In Brazil, there is also a fried cassava dish called cassava fries, a typical substitute for French fries.

Sagu is a dessert typical of southern Brazil. Tapioca pearls are cooked with cinnamon and cloves in red wine and served cold.

=== Colombia ===
In the northern coast region of Colombia, cassava is used mainly in the preparation of sancocho and other soups. The pandebono bread, made of cassava dough, is a specialty of the Valle del Cauca State. In the coastal region, cassava is known especially in the form of bollo de yuca and enyucados. Bollo de yuca is a dough made of ground yuca that is wrapped in aluminum foil and then boiled, and is served with butter and cheese. Enyucado is a dessert made of ground boiled yuca, anise, sugar, and sometimes guava jam.

In the Caribbean region of Colombia, cassava is also eaten roasted, fried or boiled with soft homemade cheese or cream cheese and mainly as a garnish of fish dishes.

The carimañola is a typical Colombian dish. It is a type of meat pie in a torpedo-shaped yuca fritter. Cassava bread was prepared by members of the Saliva people in Casanare Province, Colombia, as early as 1856.

=== Ecuador ===
In Ecuador, cassava is included in a number of dishes. In the highlands, it is found boiled in soups and stews or served as a side in place of potatoes, or fried into chips called yuquitos, which are similar to potato chips. In the coastal regions, cassava fritters called muchines de yuca are popular.

Ecuadorians also make bread from cassava flour and mashed cassava root, including the extremely popular bolitos de yuca or yuquitas which range from balls of dough formed around a heart of fresh cheese and deep-fried (found primarily in the north), to the simpler variety, which are merely baked balls of dough. Cassava flour is sold in most markets.

In the Amazon Basin, cassava is a main ingredient in chicha, a traditional fermented drink produced by the indigenous Quichua population that is often made by chewing up and spitting out the raw cassava, which is subsequently fermented for a few hours to a couple of days.

Steamed cassava leaves are part of the staple diet of the indigenous population in all areas where it is grown.

=== Guyana ===
The juice of the bitter cassava, boiled to the consistency of thick syrup and flavored with spices, is called cassareep. It is used as a basis for sauces and as a culinary flavoring, principally in tropical countries. It is exported chiefly from Guyana, where it started as a traditional recipe with its origins in Amerindian practices.

In Guyana, a popular dish using cassava called metamgie cassava is boiled with sweet potatoes, white potatoes, and coconut milk. It is also served boiled with butter only to accompany barbequed meats and fried like french fries among many households. Amerindians in Guyana uses cassava bread as a long-lasting food staple. The process of making it involves peeling and grating the tuber root, removing juice from pulp, sifting, then baking the crumbs on a skillet into a thin white wafer-like crust, before being dried further in the sun. Once in this state it lasts several months. One by-product of the process is the toxic juice, which is used to poison fish and make them easy to catch. After 24 hours it is no longer toxic and is fermented into a popular alcoholic beverage of kari, into which the cassava leaves and burnt cassava bread crumbs are also added.

=== Paraguay ===
Cassava is a staple dish of Paraguay. It grows extremely well in the soil conditions throughout the country, and it is eaten at practically every meal. It is generally boiled and served as a side dish. It is also processed into a flour and used to make chipa, a name for a type of bread made with queso paraguayo, milk, butter, and eggs (dairy and chicken having been introduced by the European settlers in the 16th and 17th centuries).

=== Peru ===
Cassava is also popular in Peru where it is used both boiled and fried. Boiled cassava is usually served as a side dish or in soup, while fried it is usually served together with onions and peppers as an appetizer or an accompaniment to chicha.

=== Suriname ===
In Suriname, cassava is widely used by the Creole, Indian, Javanese and indigenous populations. A popular dish is telo, which is salted fish and cassava, where the cassava is steamed and deep-fried. Other dishes with cassava include soups, dosi and many others.

=== Venezuela ===
Cassava is an essential ingredient in Venezuelan food, and can be found stewed, roasted or fried as side dish, sometimes with cheese, butter, or margarine. As in the Dominican Republic, cassava bread (casabe) is also a popular complement in traditional meals, such as the arepas. Venezuelan casabe is made by roasting ground cassava spread out as meter wide pancake over a hot surface (plancha) or any flattop grill. The result has the consistency of a cracker, and is broken into small pieces for consumption. There is also a sweet variety, called naiboa, made as a sandwich of two casabe pancakes with a spread of papelón in between. Naiboa also has a softer consistency.

Aboriginal tribes in Venezuela grind and press the yuca root to expel the yare (toxic juice) and make a coarse meal that is spread on a circular flat stone, to make tortas (round flat breads). This is a staple food across the country and is eaten as a carbohydrate source. When it is topped with cheese and brown sugar (papelon) it is called naiboa.

In South America, a variety of cheese buns make for a popular breakfast dish and snack. Also known as cheese breads, pão de queijo or originally and more commonly known as chipá. Made of cassava starch and cheese, the cheese buns are distinctive because the inside is chewy and moist. Their size may range from 2 to 15 cm (1 to 6 in) in diameter and approximately 5 cm (2 in) in height.

In December 2024, the practices and meanings associated with the preparation and consumption of casabe, were labelled by UNESCO as an expression of Venezuelan traditional cuisine and Intangible Cultural Heritage of Humanity. The statement was made within the framework of the nineteenth session of its Intergovernmental Committee for the Safeguarding of the Intangible Cultural Heritage. As a basis for its decision, it was considered that the preparation and consumption of casabe in Venezuela, "entail specific practices, knowledge and meanings at each stage, from cultivating the cassava and preparing the dish.

== Africa ==
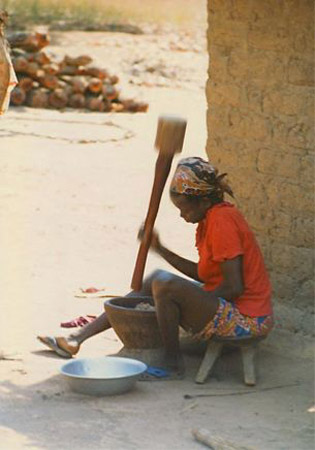
Woman pounding the cassava root into fufu in the Central African Republic

In West Africa, particularly in Nigeria and Sierra Leone, cassava is commonly prepared as eba or garri. The cassava is grated, pressed, fermented and fried, then mixed with boiling water to form a thick paste. In West Africa the cassava root is pounded, mixed with boiling water to form a thick paste and cooked like eba.

In Ghana, among all root crops and even all food crops, cassava is the most favoured by Ghanaian consumers. It can also be processed into agbelima by lactic acid fermentation.

In Ivory Coast, acheke or attieké is a side dish of fermented cassava.

In Central Africa, cassava is traditionally processed by boiling and mashing. The resulting mush can be mixed with spices and then cooked further or stored. A popular snack is made by marinating cassava in salted water for a few days and then grilling it in small portions.

Though the methods of cooking cassava vary from region to region, the main method is simply frying it. After the skin of the root is removed, the flesh is sectioned into small bite-size chunks that can then be soaked in water to aid in frying. The chunks are fried and then served, sometimes with a chili-salt mixture. This fried cassava is a very common street food as it is relatively cheap to buy, easy to prepare and good to eat. The same applies to another very common roadside method where the cassava is lightly boiled and cut into straight pieces about 8–10 inches (20–25 cm) long. These pieces are then roasted over charcoal grills, served hot by splitting through the middle and applying the chili-salt mixture.

Cassava flour can also be made into a staple food with a consistency like polenta or mashed potatoes. The Swahili name for it is ugali while the Kikuyu name for it is mwanga. It is also called fufu in Lingala and luku in Kikongo.

Residents in the sub-Saharan nation of the Central African Republic have developed a number of unique ways of utilizing the abundant cassava plant. In addition to the methods described above, local residents fry thin slices of the cassava root, resulting in a crunchy snack similar in look and taste to potato chips.

In the provinces of Bandundu and Bas-Congo, in Western Democratic Republic of the Congo manioc root is pounded into a paste, fermented and cooked in banana or other forest leaves. The resulting hard packets make for good travel food due to their long shelf-life. This form of manioc is called kwanga in Kikongo and Lingala.

The root can be pounded into flour and made into bread or cookies. Many recipes have been documented and tested by groups of women in Mozambique and Zambia. This flour can also be mixed with precise amounts of salt and water to create a heavy liquid used as white paint in construction.

The cassava leaf is also soaked and boiled for extended periods of time to remove toxins and then eaten. Known as gozo in Sango, sakasaka in Kikongo, sombe in Swahili and mpondu in Lingala, the taste is similar to spinach.

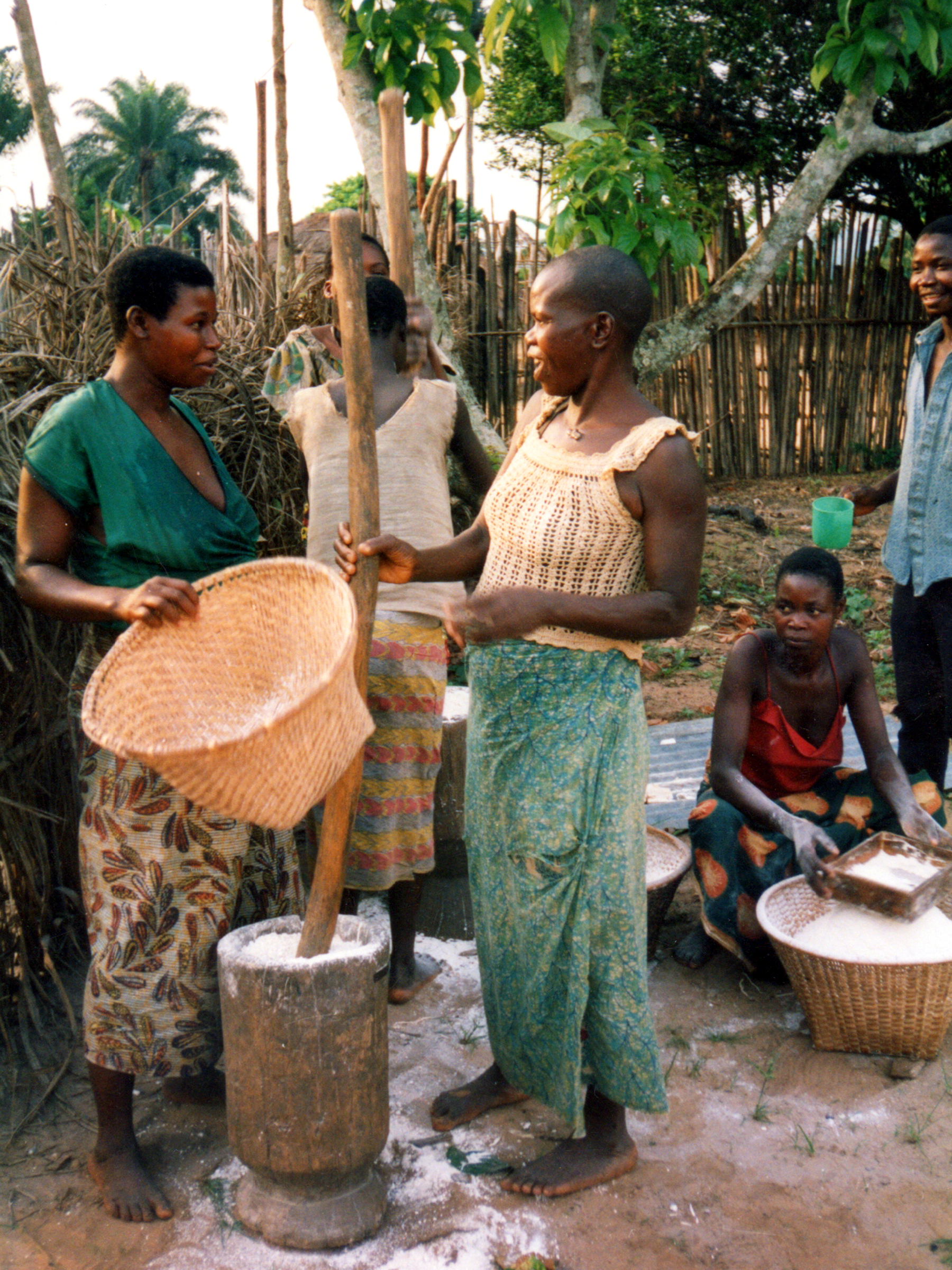
Fufu being prepared in the Democratic Republic of the Congo.

Akpụ (fufu) is made from the starchy cassava-root flour. Tapioca (or fecula), essentially a flavorless, starchy ingredient produced from treated and dried cassava (manioc) root, is used in cooking. It is similar to sago and is commonly used to make milky pudding similar to rice pudding. Boba tapioca pearls are made from cassava root. It is used in cereals; several tribes in South America have used it extensively. It is also used in making cassava cake, a popular pastry.

Cassava flour is used in making garri, a popular food in Nigeria, and dried, shredded cassava is used in making abacha (African salad), a delicacy among the Igbos of Southeastern Nigeria.

Garri is a creamy-white, granular flour with a slightly sour, fermented flavor from fermented, gelatinized fresh cassava tubers. Garri soakings is a delicacy that costs less than US$1 in Nigeria, Cameroon, Congo, Ghana and other parts of Africa, where cassava is cultivated. It is made by soaking garri in cold water, adding sugar and roasted groundnut (peanut), and sometimes evaporated milk. Garri soakings prepared with coconut water are also popular.

=== Congo ===
In the Democratic Republic of the Congo, the leaves are washed with hot water, pounded in a mortar, and boiled. In the boiling process, the pot is not covered, which facilitates the escape of the toxin, hydrogen cyanide. It is covered when ingredients such as oil, onion, fish, etc. are added, and opened as needed for stirring. The sauce eaten with rice, plantain or cassava paste is called mpondu in Lingala, sombe in Swahili or sakasaka in Kikongo. Manioc leaves, mpondu or sakasaka is very nutritious. The cassava root flour is also used to make a cassava bread by boiling flour until it is a thick, rubbery ball (bukari in Swahili or luku in Kikongo). The flour is also made into a paste and fermented before boiling after wrapping in banana or other forest leaves. This fermented state is called chikwangue in French or kwanga or nkwanga in Lingala and Kikongo. This last form has a long shelf life and is a preferred food to take on long trips where refrigeration is not possible.

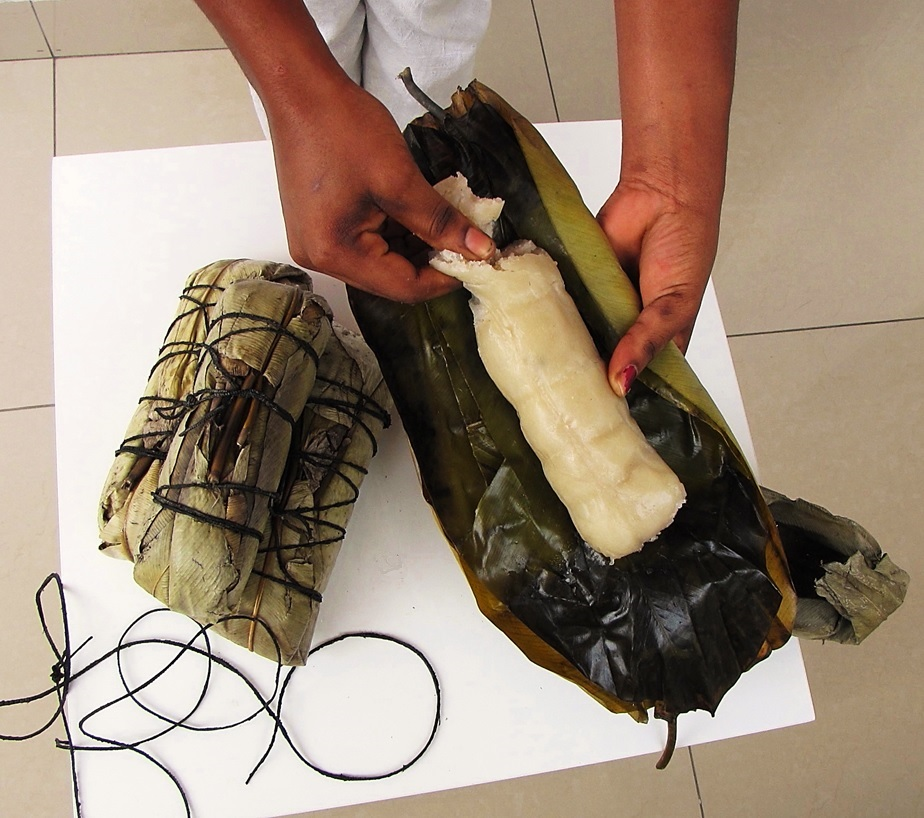
Chikwangue - cassava paste roll cooked inside a leaf wrap

In some African countries like Ghana, Cameroun, Congo, Malawi and recently in world's largest producer of cassava, Nigeria, flour for making bread contains up to 40 per cent high-quality cassava flour and wheat flour.

=== Uganda ===
In Arua, Northwestern Uganda, the Lugbara grow cassava as a staple food. After harvest, they peel its skin, cut into smaller pieces, and leave to ferment and dry. When ready, it is ground into flour which is mingled to prepare enya asa bread. This cassava flour can be mixed with sorghum, millet and other cereals depending on preference. Cassava leaves are also a delicacy called pandu. In rural settings, cassava is used to brew a strong colourless drink called okaritua which men enjoy drinking while sitting in the sun on market days.

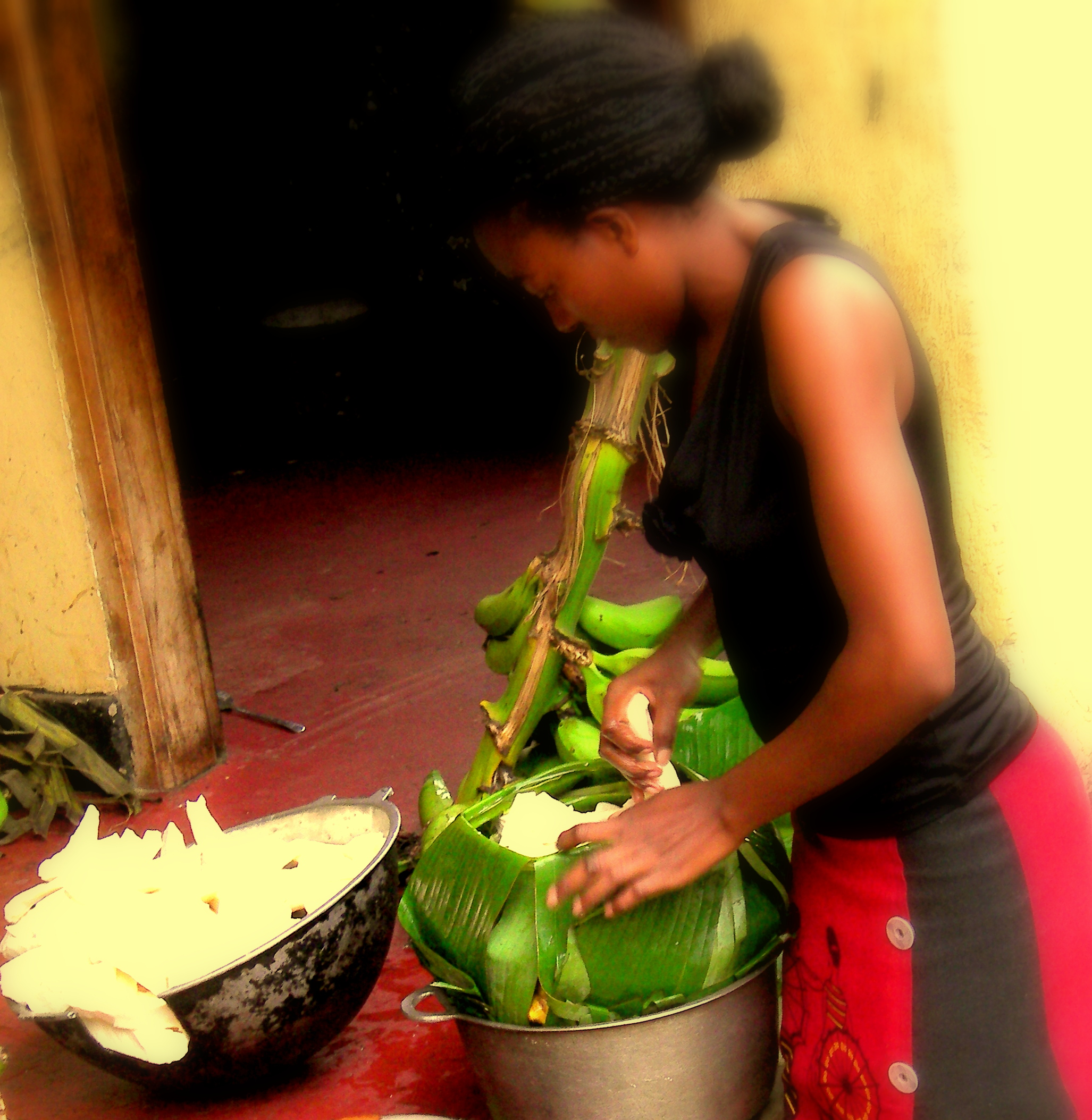
Cassava and matooke for steaming

In Baganda, the Casava plant tubers are called Muwogo. The cassava is usually peeled, cleaned and cooked in various ways. It can be steamed in banana leaves known as Muwogo omufumbe, cooked with beans to make katogo and fried to make cassava chips.

== Asia ==
=== India ===
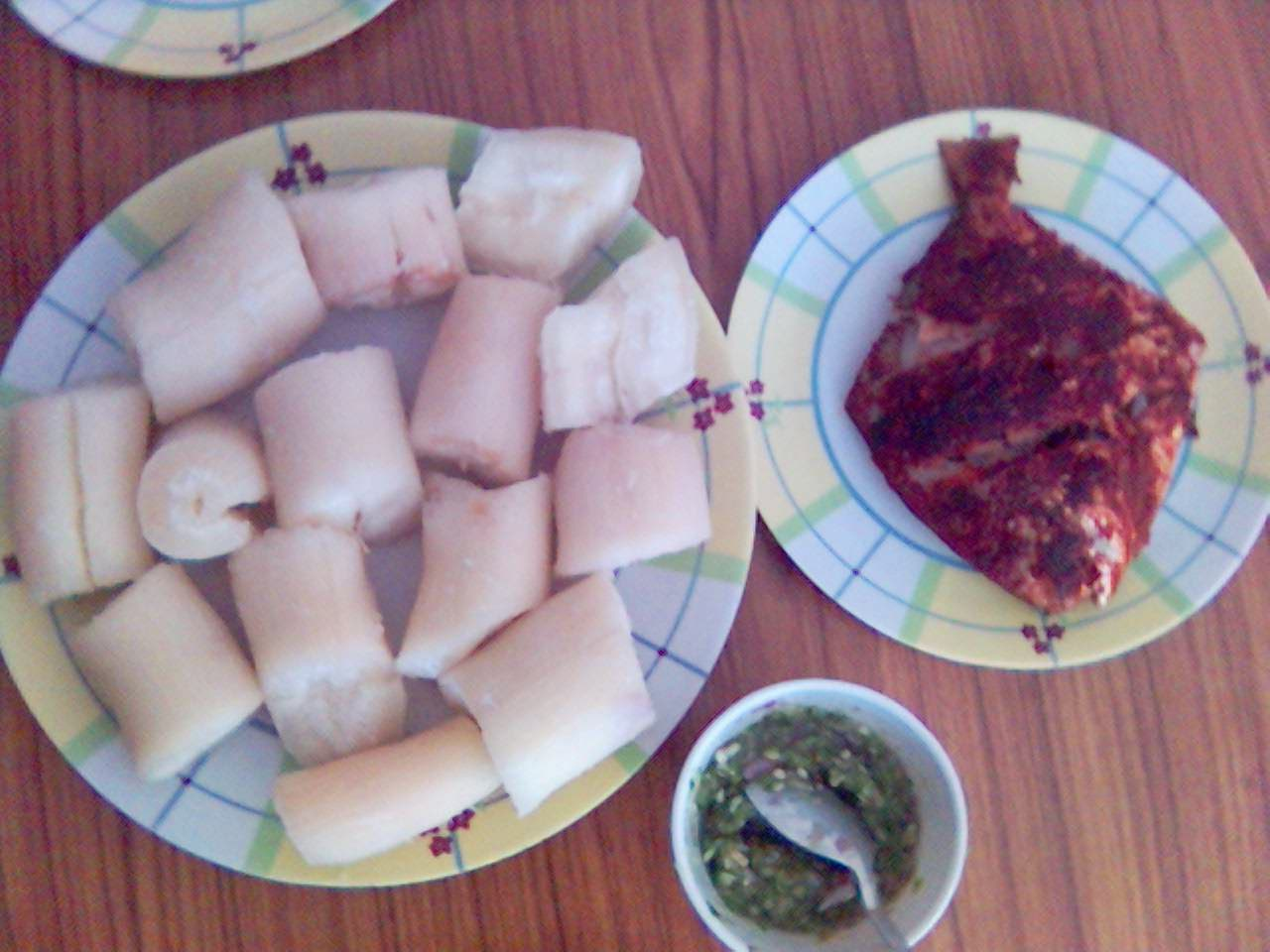
Boiled cassava served with fish and chutney

In Assam শিমলু আলু (shimolu aalu or yuca) is a popular root crop used as part of Assamese delicacies. It is fried, mashed, or added to various gravies. The leaves are also used for certain preparations.

The Gorkhas of India, cassava is called shimal tarul and is eaten boiled with pungent chutney or boiled, chopped and fried. It is also pounded into flour. In the Maghe Sakranti festival, when boiled root vegetables are especially eaten, cassava is a major presence. Shimal tarul is also fermented into an alcoholic drink called tarul ko jaahr.

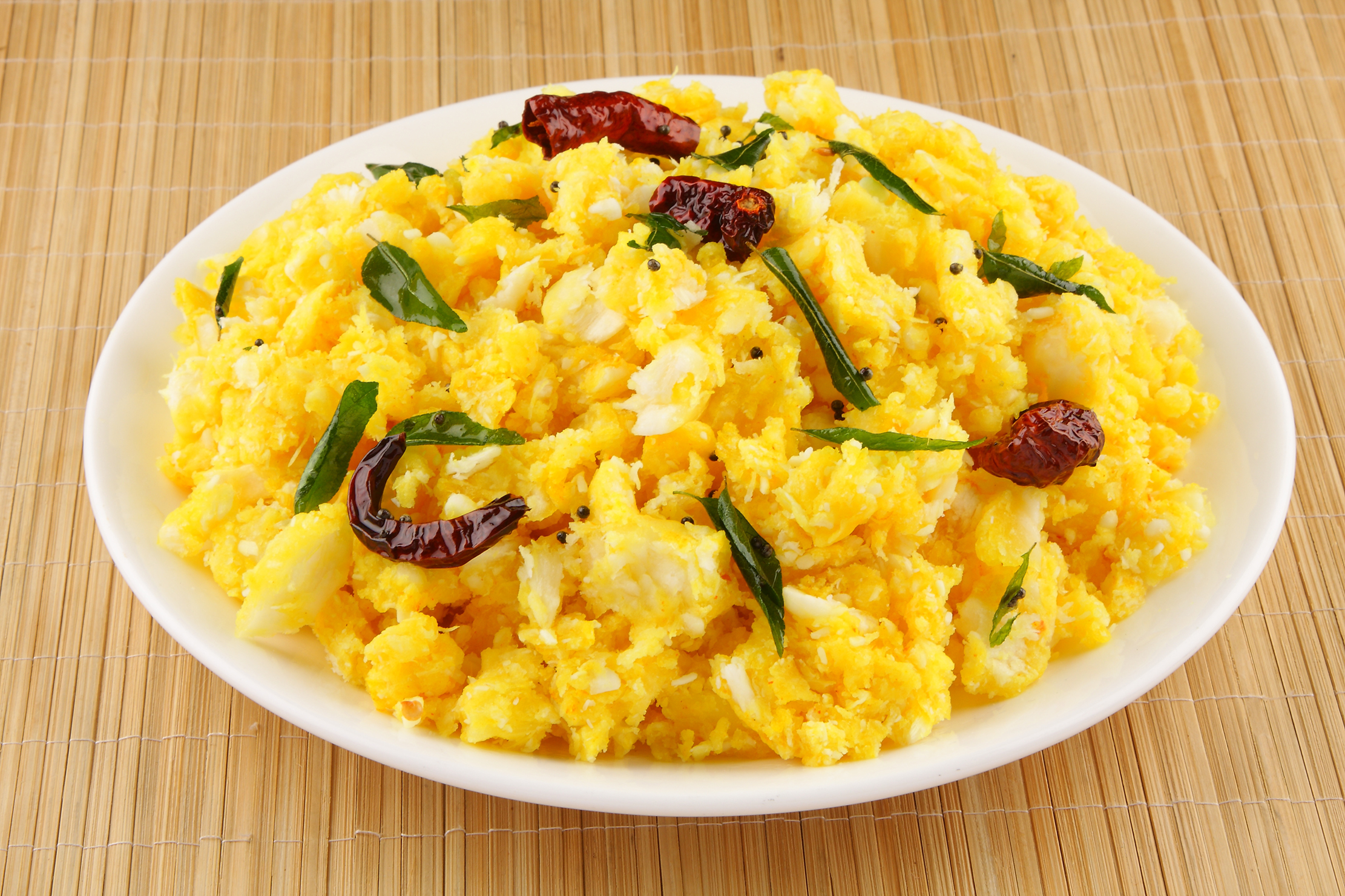
Boiled cassava with turmeric and chilli, Kerala

In the state of Kerala, India, cassava is a secondary staple food. Boiled cassava is normally eaten with fish curry (kappayum meenum in Malayalam, which literally means "cassava with fish") or meat, and is a traditional favorite of many Keralites. Kappa biriyani – cassava mixed with meat – is a popular dish in central Kerala.

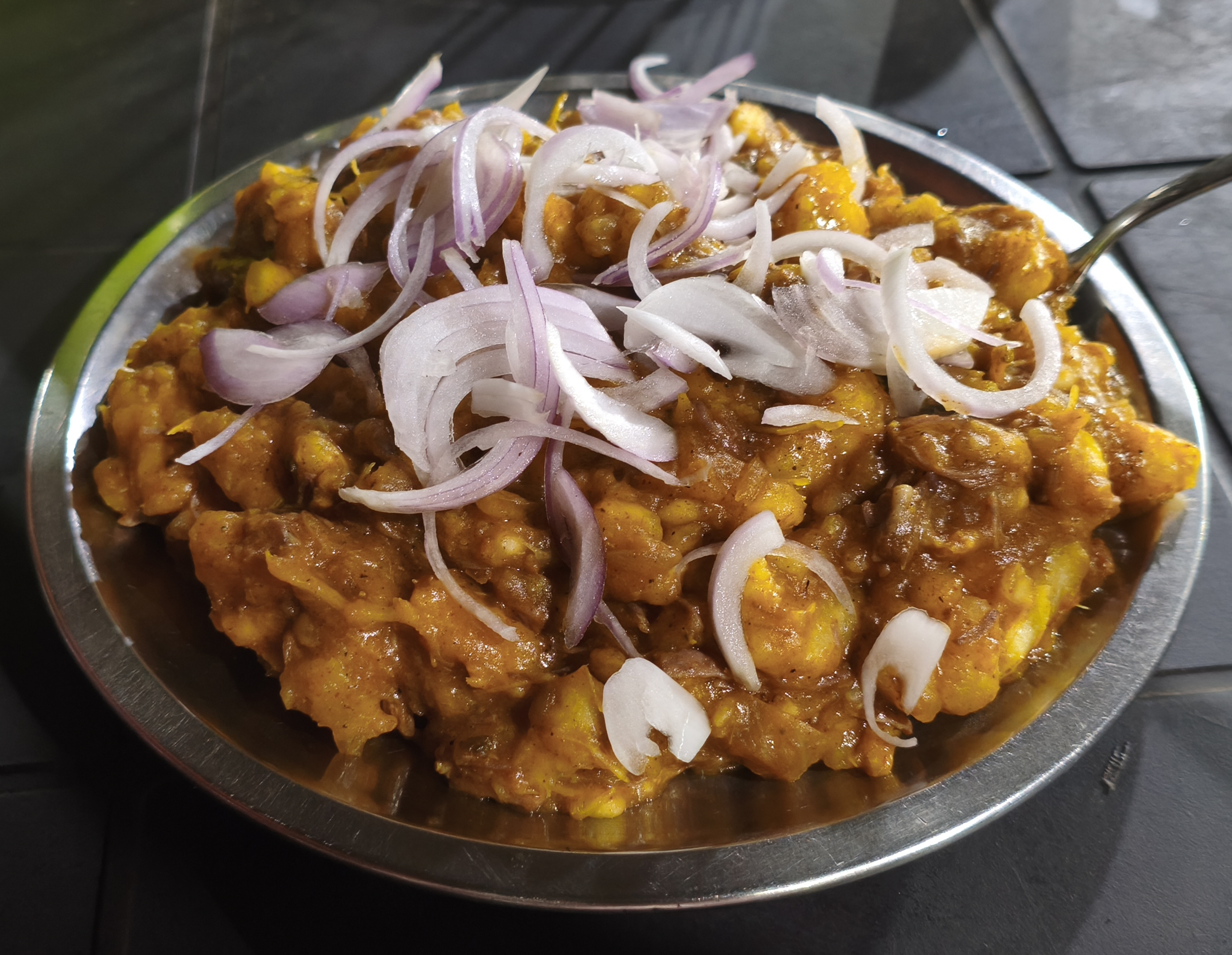
Kappa Biriyani served in restaurants

In Tamil Nadu, it is called maravalli kizhangu. The household name for processed cassava in Andhra Pradesh is saggu biyyam. Cassava is also deep fried in oil to make homemade crisps, then sprinkled with flaked chilies or chili powder and salt for taste. It is known as Mara Genasu in Kannada.

In Odisha people use Cassava pearls (sabudaana साबु दाणा) for making kheer for brat/puja. It is also used for making sabudana upma.

Cassava pearls (sabudaana साबु दाणा) are made from cassava-root starch and are used for making sweet milk pudding in many parts of India. In western India, cassava pearls are used to make a salted and lightly spiced khichadi or deep-fried patties known as sabudana vada. These are considered pure foods by Hindus in Maharashtra which can be eaten during fasts, when other foods cannot be partaken.

=== Indonesia ===
In Indonesia, singkong or ketela (cassava) is an important food. It is used as a staple food during hard times but has a lower status than rice. It is boiled or fried (after steaming), baked under hot coals, or added to a dessert called kolak. It is also fermented to make peuyeum and tape, a sweet paste that can be mixed with sugar and made into a drink, the alcoholic (and green) es tape. It is available as an alternative to potato crisps. The starch can be made into getuk cake or krupuk crackers. Gaplek, a dried form of cassava, is an important source of calories in the off-season in the limestone hills of southern Java. Young cassava leaves are also eaten, cooked in different ways in different regional cuisines, e.g. as gulai daun singkong (cassava leaves in coconut milk), boiled and served dry in Padang cuisine, boiled with spices in Javanese cuisine, as urap (Javanese salad), and as the main ingredient in buntil (Javanese vegetable rolls). In 2011, modified cassava flour became common, and some instant noodle producers have used it silently, especially for low-end instant noodles as a partial substitute of pricy flour. The flour is often added to pastry flour although the result is a pastry that is a little stiff. Getuk cakes can be difficult to digest for diners not used to it and can result in severe cramps and discomfort.

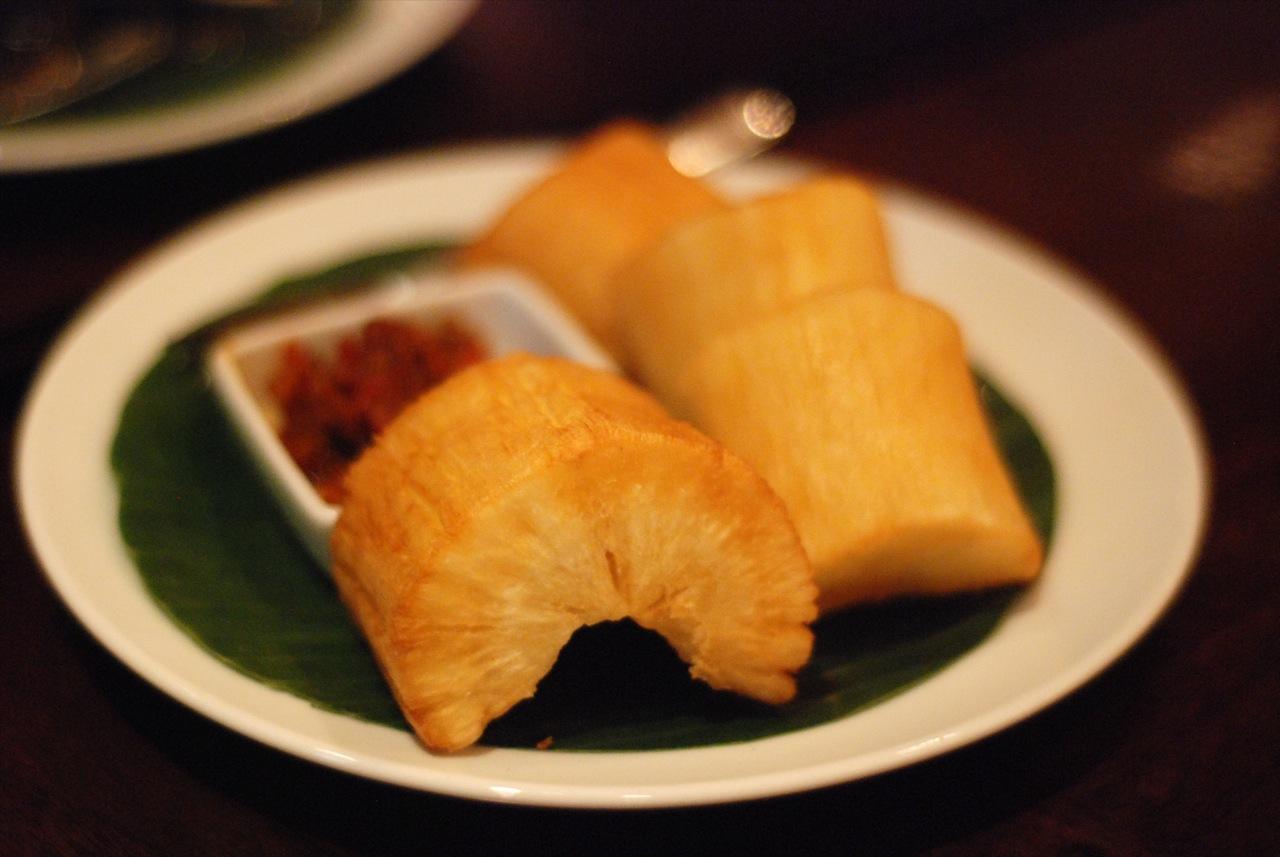
Fried cassava in Indonesia

=== Philippines ===
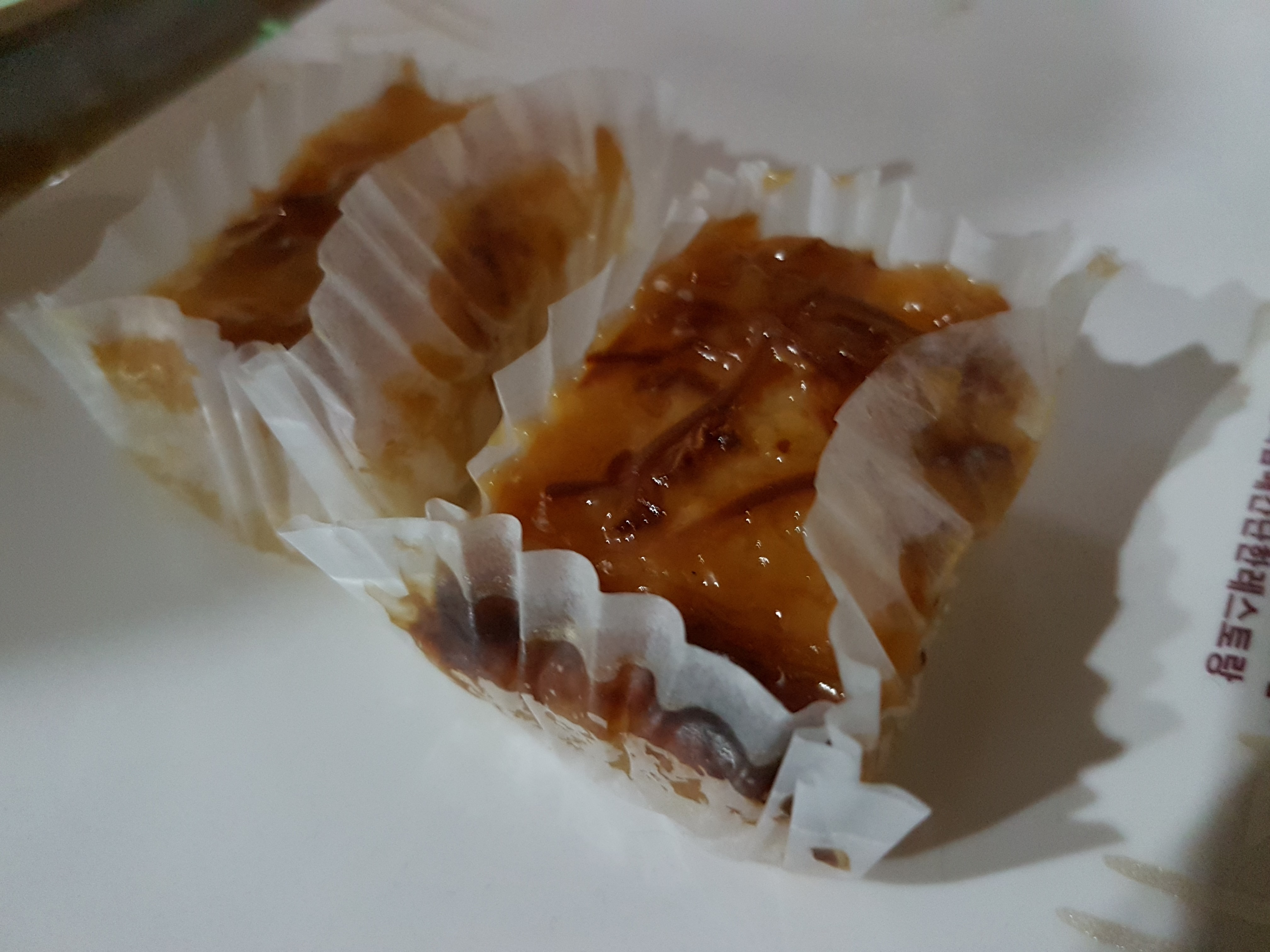
Cassava cake (Philippines).

In the Philippines, cassava is mainly prepared as a dessert. Traditional methods of preparation include steaming, mashing, grating, boiling, and frying. It is made into bibingka, suman, pudding, chips (kabkab), cassava cake, cassava balls, pitsi-pitsi, pancakes, or coated with caramelized sugar. The leaves are also cooked and eaten. Cassava cake (bibingkang kamoteng kahoy) is made by combining grated cassava with coconut milk, butter, eggs, and milk. It is also referred to as cassava bibingka.

In Visayas and Mindanao, kabkab or salbaro or salvaro is a snack made from thin fried sheets of cassava drizzled with caramelized fruit syrup. The cassava is first grated and then formed into flat thin sheets. The sheets are boiled and then allowed to sun dry for 2 days, after which they are deep fried, cooled, and then drizzled with caramelized fruit syrup.

=== Malaysia ===
In Sarawak, cassava leaves (long-leaf variety) is boiled and eaten with sambal (shrimp paste) or tempoyak (fermented durian). The long-leaf variety is also cooked with pork, chicken, fish, or snake in a large bamboo stick. This traditional dish is called manok pansoh. In Negeri Sembilan, cassava leaves are also cooked with coconut milk to make a main dish called masak lemak pucuk ubi or gulai daun ubi, just like in Minangkabau culture.

A staple food during the Japanese occupation of Malaysia in World War II, today cassava is often boiled and served with sambal tumis. Cassava is also processed into kerepek ubi, in which the cassava is sliced thin and then deep-fried. Cassava is also used to make tapai. Young cassava leaves can also be cooked to make

=== Sri Lanka ===
Though cassava is not widely cultivated in Sri Lanka, tapioca, called manyokka in Sinhalese (and locally translated to English as manioc), is used as a supplementary food or sometimes as a breakfast food. Often the tapioca tuber is unearthed, cleaned while it is still fresh, and is then boiled in an open pot. The resulting boiled tapioca is often eaten strained with freshly scraped coconut. Some preparations call for the use of saffron to make tapioca yellowish in color, with or without adding peppercorn and scraped coconut directly to the boiling pot itself once the water is near fully evaporated. Another popular preparation contains katta sambol, a paste made of chili, shallots, Maldives fish (a preparation of dried fish) and lime juice, served side by side with boiled tapioca.

Manioc curry is a side dish often served with rice. Minced wilted leaves of the plant with scraped coconut are also prepared as a side dish called manyokka kolla malluma. Dried thinly sliced salted tapioca is used as popular snack. There is a belief among Sri Lankans that one should not eat manioc together with ginger, since it would lead to food poisoning. (Fresh ginger might contain an enzyme beta D-glucosidase that could potentially lyse cyanogenic glucosides in cassava to release cyanide.)

=== Vietnam ===
Cassava is planted throughout Vietnam and is among the cheapest foods available.

Bánh khoai mì is a dessert snack dish made with sugar, coconut and grated cassava. It is usually eaten as a snack and for occasions. There are two varieties of this dish, Bánh khoai mì nướng is usually baked while Bánh khoai mì hấp is steamed even though it is eaten to a lesser extent.

== Oceania ==
Cassava was imported to Polynesia during the 19th century. The typical mode of preparation by Samoans and Tongans is steam-baking in underground ovens, although boiling in water or baking in coconut cream is also common. Polynesians have also adapted cassava into traditional desserts such as faikakai (Tonga) and fa'ausi (Samoa), both of which are prepared by steaming or baking finely grated (or mashed) cassava with coconut cream, brown sugar or fruit juice.

In the Cook Islands, a popular dessert called poke is made from overripe bananas, cassava starch and coconut cream.

== See also ==
- Potato-based dishes
- Tapioca chips
