= Putli mandi =

Philippine dessert

- Alternative names: Putlimandi, putli'mandi', putli-mandi, putlihmandi
- Type: Rice cake
- Place of origin: The Philippines
- Region or state: Sulu
- Similar dishes: Pichi-pichi, Onde-onde

Putli mandi, is a Filipino dessert steamed rice cake originating from the Tausug and Yakan people of Sulu. It is made from glutinous rice dough (although it may also be made with cassava) rolled into balls and filled with sweetened coconut strips (hinti). It traditionally uses pulut glutinous rice which gives it a natural deep purple color, but it is also commonly dyed in modern versions. It is sprinkled with fresh grated coconut before serving. The name comes from Tausug putli ("princess") and mandi ("bath").

In terms of preparation, putli mandi closely resembles onde-onde, a traditional kue or kuih commonly found in Maritime Southeast Asia, which is typically green in colour and filled with palm sugar. In the Philippines, it is sometimes compared to pichi-pichi, a gelatinous cassava dessert, though pichi-pichi is usually unfilled and differs in texture and presentation.

== See also ==
- Cuchinta
- Daral
- Pichi-pichi
