= Chilate =

Sweet drink from Mexico

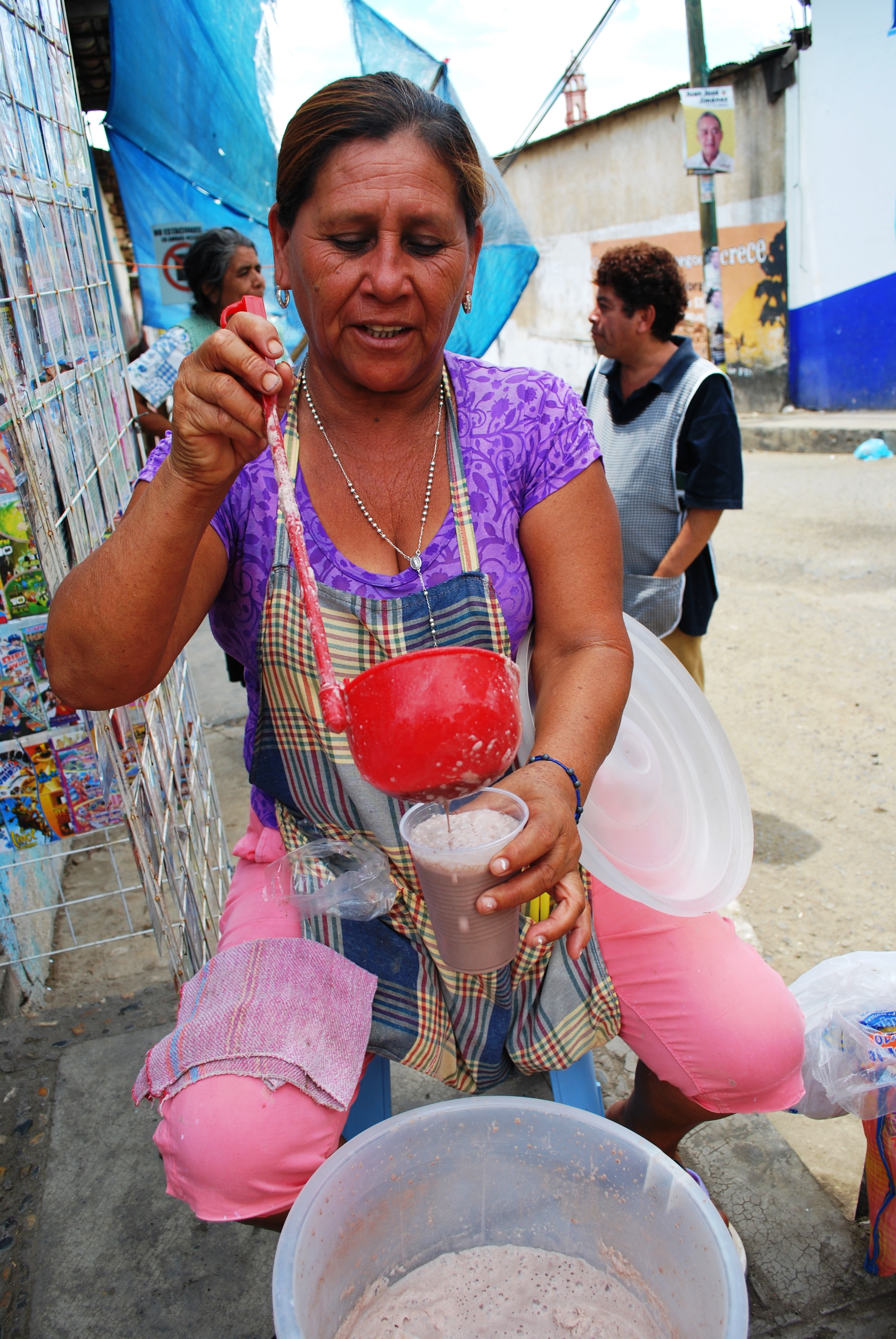
Woman selling chilate in Ometepec, Mexico

Chilate is a drink prepared with cocoa, rice, cinnamon and sugar. Its name comes from the Nahuatl chilliatl (ˈt͡ʃilliat͡ɬ), which means “chili water". It is originally from Ayutla de los Libres, Guerrero, Mexico. Chilate is served cold and usually accompanied by buñuelos. Atolli, or "maize drink" in Nahuatl, is the base for chilate.

Chilate is a drink widely present in Amuzgos, Mixtec, Tlapanec people, and Afro-Mexican communities in the state of Guerrero, as well as in Acapulco.

Not to be confused with the chilate of Guatemala, El Salvador, Honduras and Nicaragua (especially in Jinotepe, Diriamba, Masatepe), which is a drink with a different preparation.

== Variations ==
In El Salvador and Honduras, chilate is a hot drink prepared with corn dough and water. It is typically spiced up with black pepper and ginger, but there are variations to which anise, vanilla or cinnamon are added.

The recognizable characteristic of the Salvadorean and Honduran chilate is black pepper, as it is added whole; when the drink is served, it is not strained out. This chilate is served to accompany typical desserts and sweets such as dulce de camote, dulce de platano or nuegados. It does not contain cocoa beans.

In Nicaragua, chilate is prepared with Pujagua corn, a purplish variation of corn. Ground cacao beans are added to this hot drink, as well as cinnamon, sugar and milk.

In Oaxaca, Mexico, chilate is a typical dish of the region that is a type of broth made with chicken.
