= Enyucado =

Coconut cheesecake from Colombia

Enyucado is a cheesecake in Colombian cuisine cassava cake made with cassava and coconut, sugar, and sometimes anise, and guava jam. Enyucado is from the Caribbean region of Colombia.

In Costa Rican cuisine, an enyucado is a fried cassava croquette generally filled with ground meat, cheese, or vegetables.

== See also ==
- Cassava-based dishes
- List of cakes
