= Afro-Belizean =

There are two main Afro-Belizean ethnic groups:

- Belizean Creole people, also called Kriols
- Garifuna, also called Black Caribs
