= Gaplek =

Javanese foodstuff

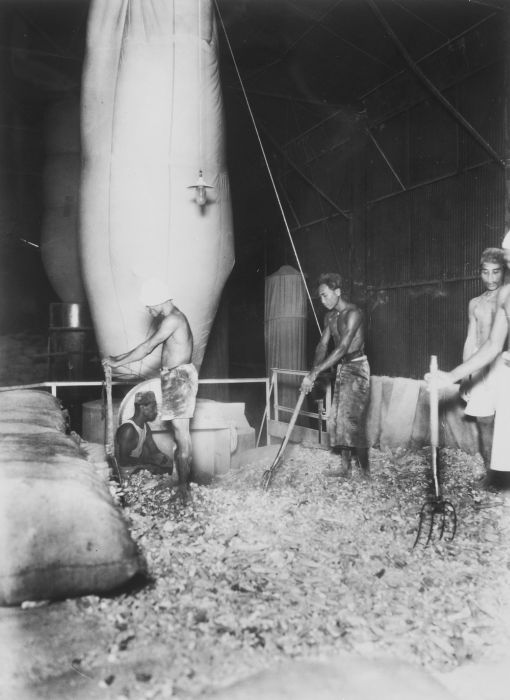
Gaplek making in Colonial Surabaya.

Gaplek is a Javanese foodstuff made from sliced, dried root of cassava. It is mainly produced in the limestone uplands of Java, where the soil grows rice poorly. The cassava root is harvested, peeled, and cut into pieces 6 to 8 inches long, and dried in the sun for 1 to 3 days. After drying, the gaplek is stored in a cool, dry place. If sufficiently dry it is relatively unaffected by pests. When other food sources are unavailable or too expensive, the gaplek pieces are pounded into small bits and cooked like rice. They also can be used as raw material for making dishes like tiwul, growol, gogik and gatot. Gaplek is popular among civilians in Trenggalek. Some say that this food is called gaplek because people who usually eat feel so full that which they say "gaplek" which means really full.
