= Pichi-pichi =

Filipino cassava dessert

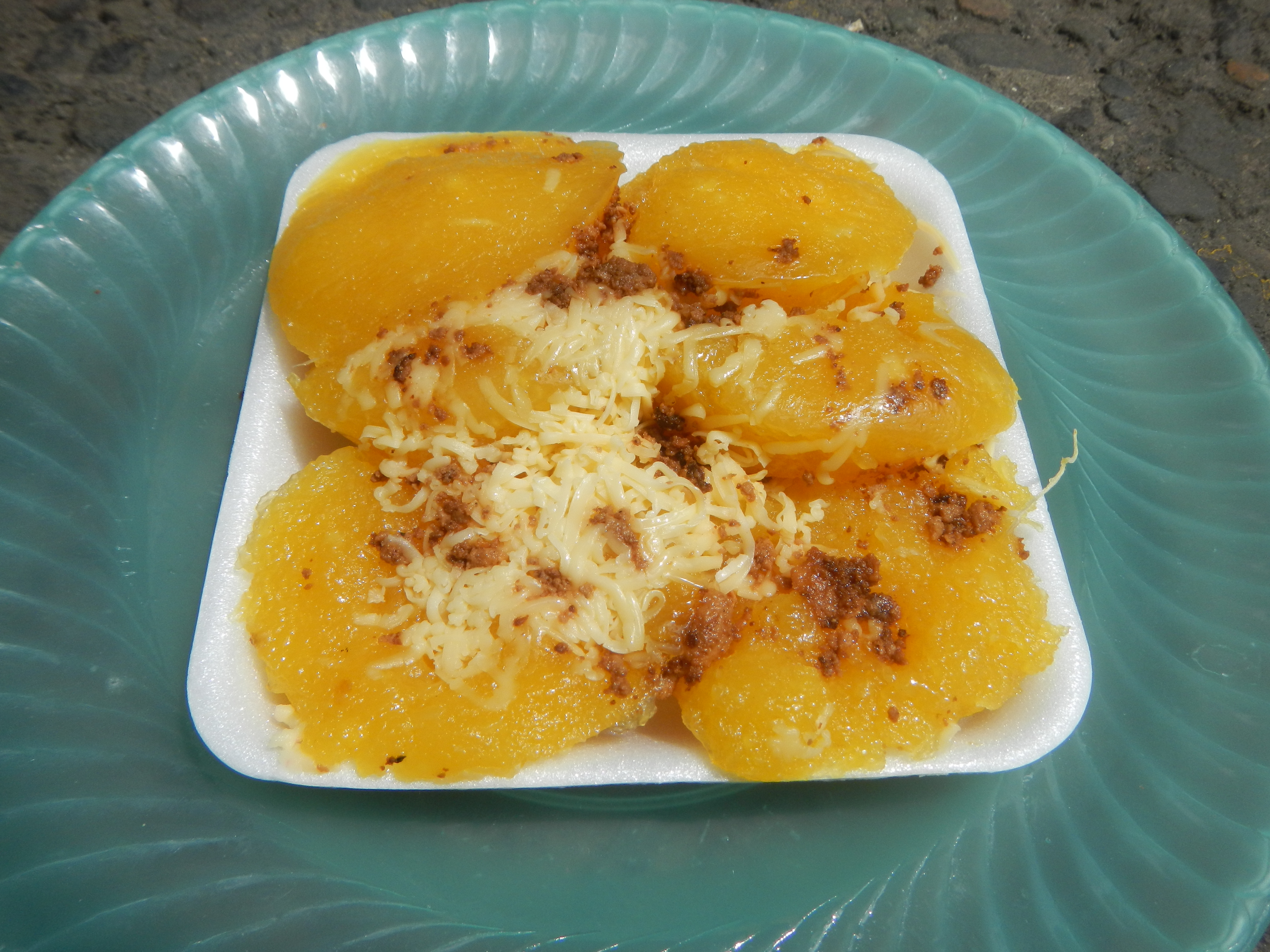
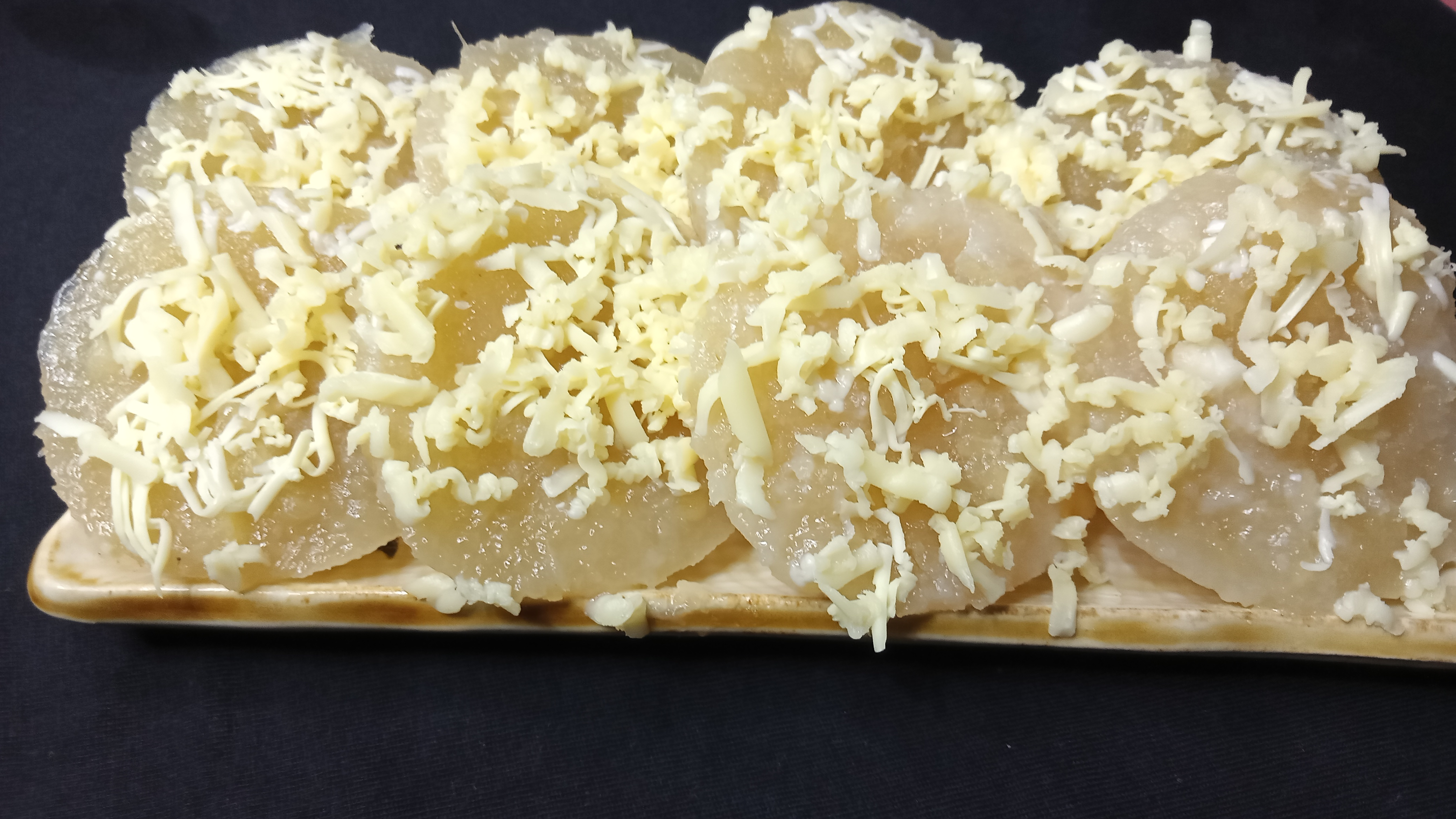
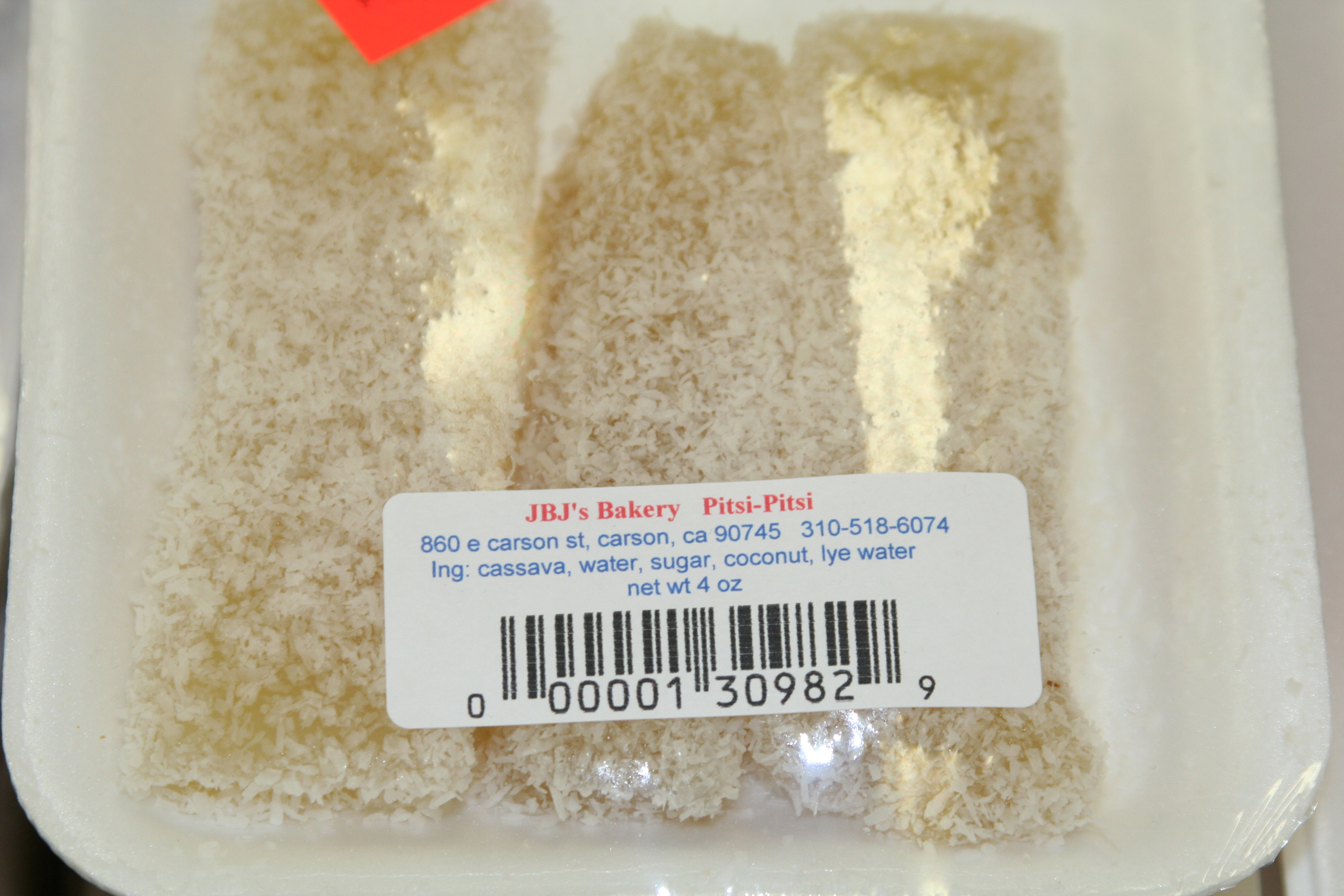
- Clockwise from the top: Pitsi-pitsi with latik and cheese, Pitsi-pitsi with coconut, Pitsi-pitsi with cheese
- Alternative names: Pitsi-pitsî
- Type: Cassava cake
- Course: Dessert
- Place of origin: Philippines
- Serving temperature: Room temperature
- Main ingredients: Coconut milk, cassava, lye, sugar
- Variations: Topped with cheese and/or latik, rolled in grated coconut

Pichi-pichi, also spelled pitsi-pitsi, is a Filipino dessert made from steamed cassava flour balls mixed with sugar and lye. It is also commonly flavored with pandan leaves. It is served rolled in freshly grated coconut, cheese, or latik (coconut caramel) before serving.

The name is believed to have been derived from the Araucanian word pichi meaning "small" and was used by Spanish Americans in the 19th century. The dish is associated with the province of Quezon where this delicacy is very common and especially with the Pahiyas Festival in Lucban where it is believed that this dish had originated.

A similar dish to pichi-pichi is the putli mandi of the Tausug and Yakan people. It is prepared identically, and differs only in that it has a filling of sweetened coconut strips (hinti).

It is similar to palitaw, except palitaw is made into thin flat cakes and is made with glutinous rice flour.

== Preparation ==
The cassava is first peeled, grated, and washed. The grated cassava is then mixed with water, sugar, and lye and then the mixture is transferred into pans or molds which are then put in the steamer until the mixture is cooked and soft. The cooked pitsi-pitsi may then be rolled on freshly grated coconut or topped with grated cheese and latik. Some vendors add food coloring to the mixture prior to steaming.

== See also ==
- Bukayo
- Cassava cake
- Maja blanca
- Palitaw
- Putli mandi
- Sapin-sapin
