= Cassava cake =

Filipino moist cake

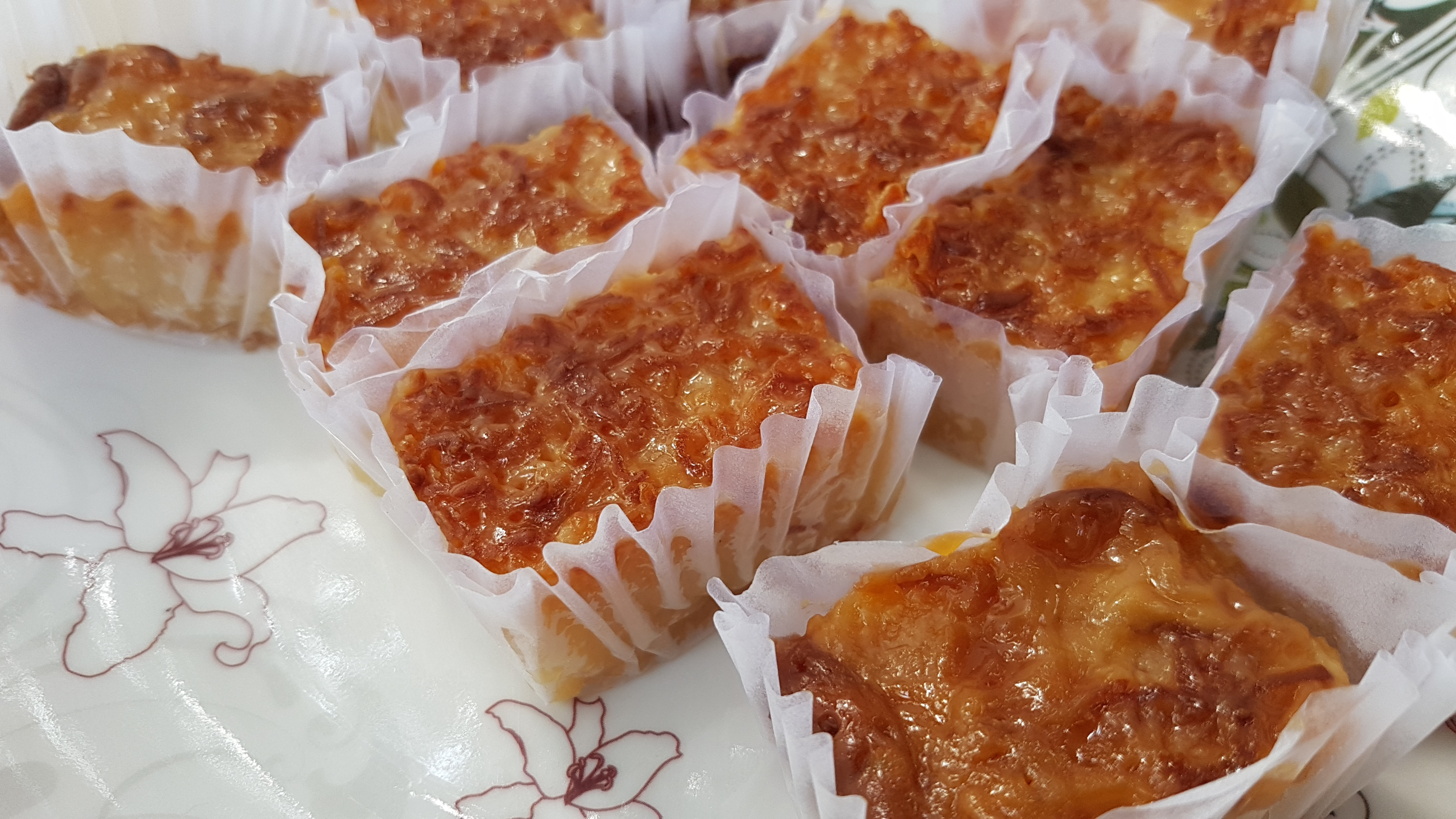
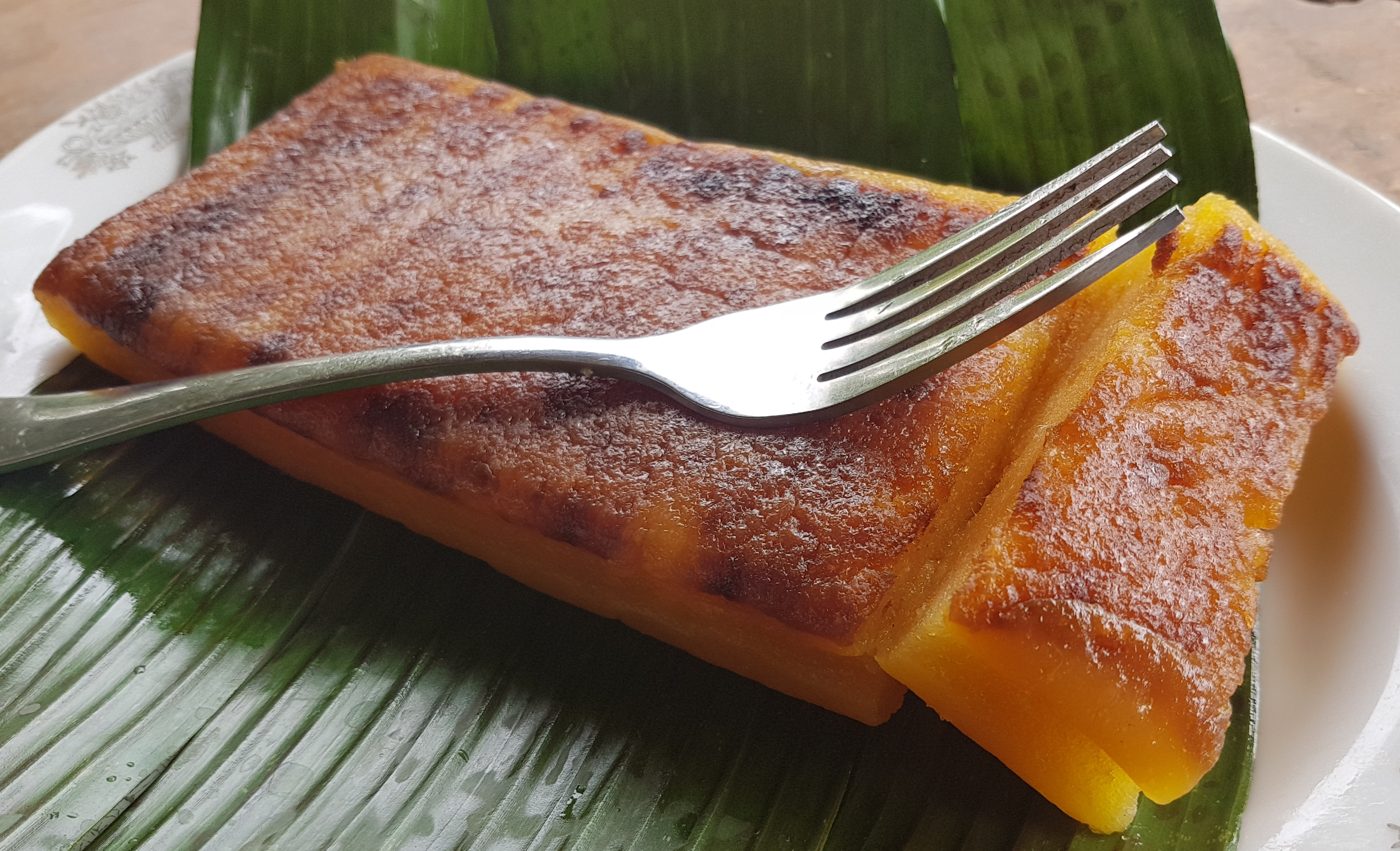
- Alternative names: cassava pudding, cassava pie, cassava bibingka, bibingkang kamoteng kahoy, bibingkang balanghoy, budin
- Course: Dessert
- Place of origin: Philippines
- Serving temperature: room temperature
- Similar dishes: Bánh khoai mì, Bibingka, Pilawpinan mont

Cassava cake is a traditional Filipino moist cake made from grated cassava, coconut milk, and condensed milk with a custard layer on top. It is a very popular dish in the Philippines, where it is commonly eaten for merienda. It is also served during gatherings and special occasions.

== Origins and history ==
Cassava was one of the crops imported from Latin America through the Manila galleons from at least the 16th century. Cassava cake is a type of bibingka (traditional baked cakes), having its origins from adopting native recipes but using cassava instead of the traditional galapong (ground glutinous rice) batter. It is also known more rarely as cassava bibingka or bibingkang kamoteng kahoy, although the English name is more commonly used. In Quezon, cassava cake is more commonly known as budin.

== Description ==
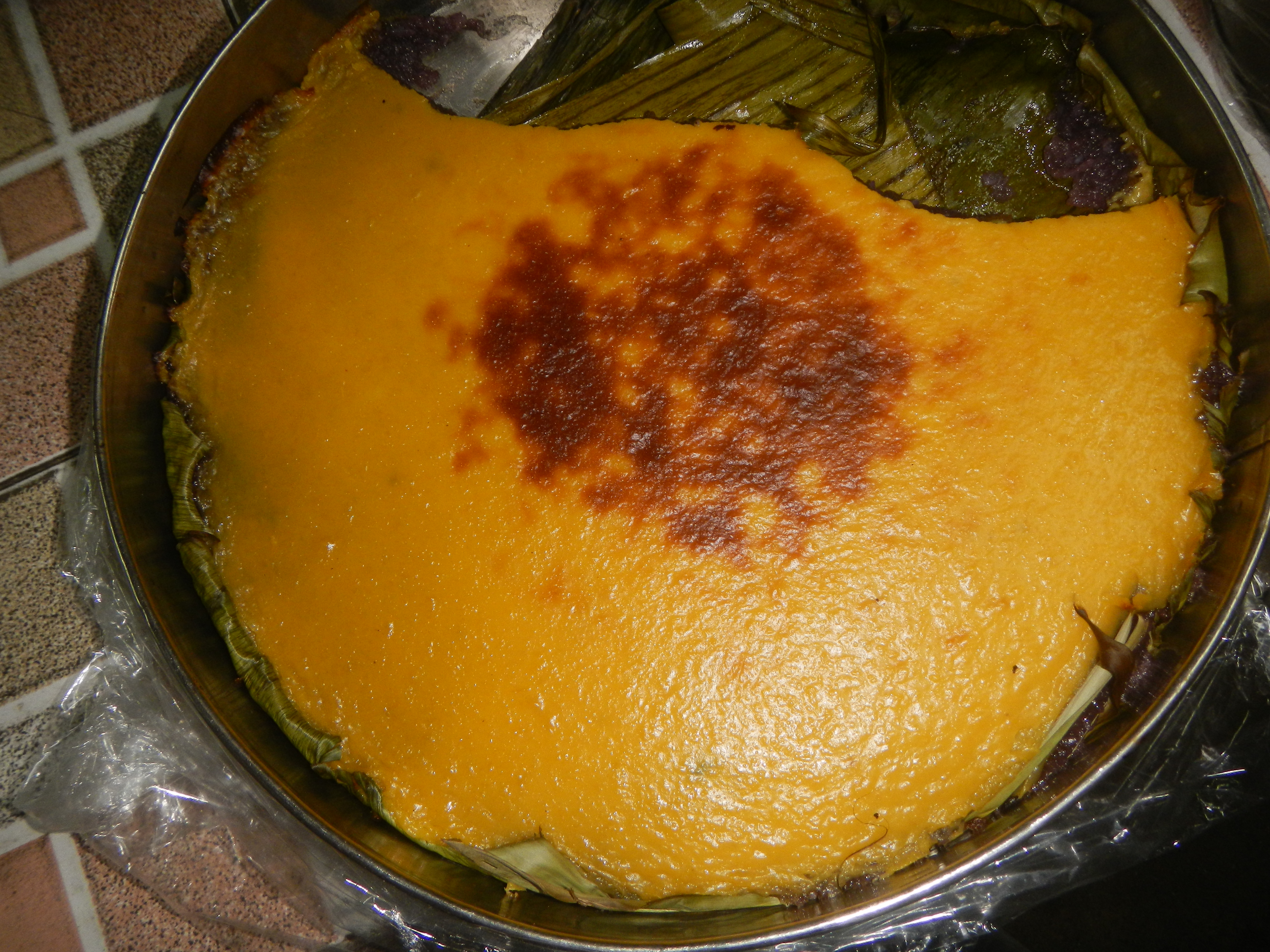
Cassava cake from Bulacan baked on banana leaves and topped with milk-based custard

Cassava cake is made from grated cassava mixed with gata (coconut milk), condensed milk, and egg whites. Some recipes also add butter (or margarine), vanilla, evaporated milk, and additional sugar. These are poured into a flat-bottomed pan lined with banana leaves or greased. It is baked until it has an even firm consistency and a light brown color.

The texture of the cake can be adjusted by varying the amount of grated cassava used. Cakes with less cassava content tend to be softer and moister, while cakes with more cassava content are firm and chewy.

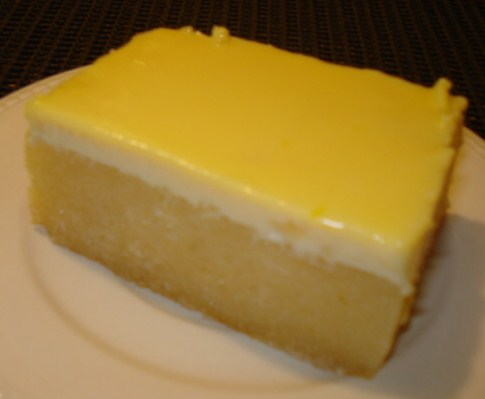
Cassava cake with a thick milk-based custard topping

The topping is cooked separately. It is traditionally coconut-based custard, made with the egg yolks mixed with condensed milk, sugar, and kakang gata (coconut cream). It is poured on top of the cake and baked again for an additional few minutes until the top layer solidifies. The amount varies, with some versions having a very thin custard layer, while in other versions, the custard layer is as thick as the cake. Some modern versions also use milk-based custard toppings when coconut cream isn't available, or don't bake in a top layer at all.

Additional toppings may be added before the second baking, like cheddar cheese, macapuno strings, or grated coconut, among others. It is further garnished with additional toppings like more grated cheese or latik. The cake is then left to cool, after which it is sliced into squares and served.

Cassava (known as kamoteng kahoy and balinghoy in Tagalog and balanghoy in Visayan) is poisonous when eaten raw due to its cyanogenic glucoside content. Most cassava variants in the Philippines are of the sweet variety, which has lower cyanogenic glucoside content. However, care should still be taken that the cassava is properly prepared before cooking.

== Variants ==
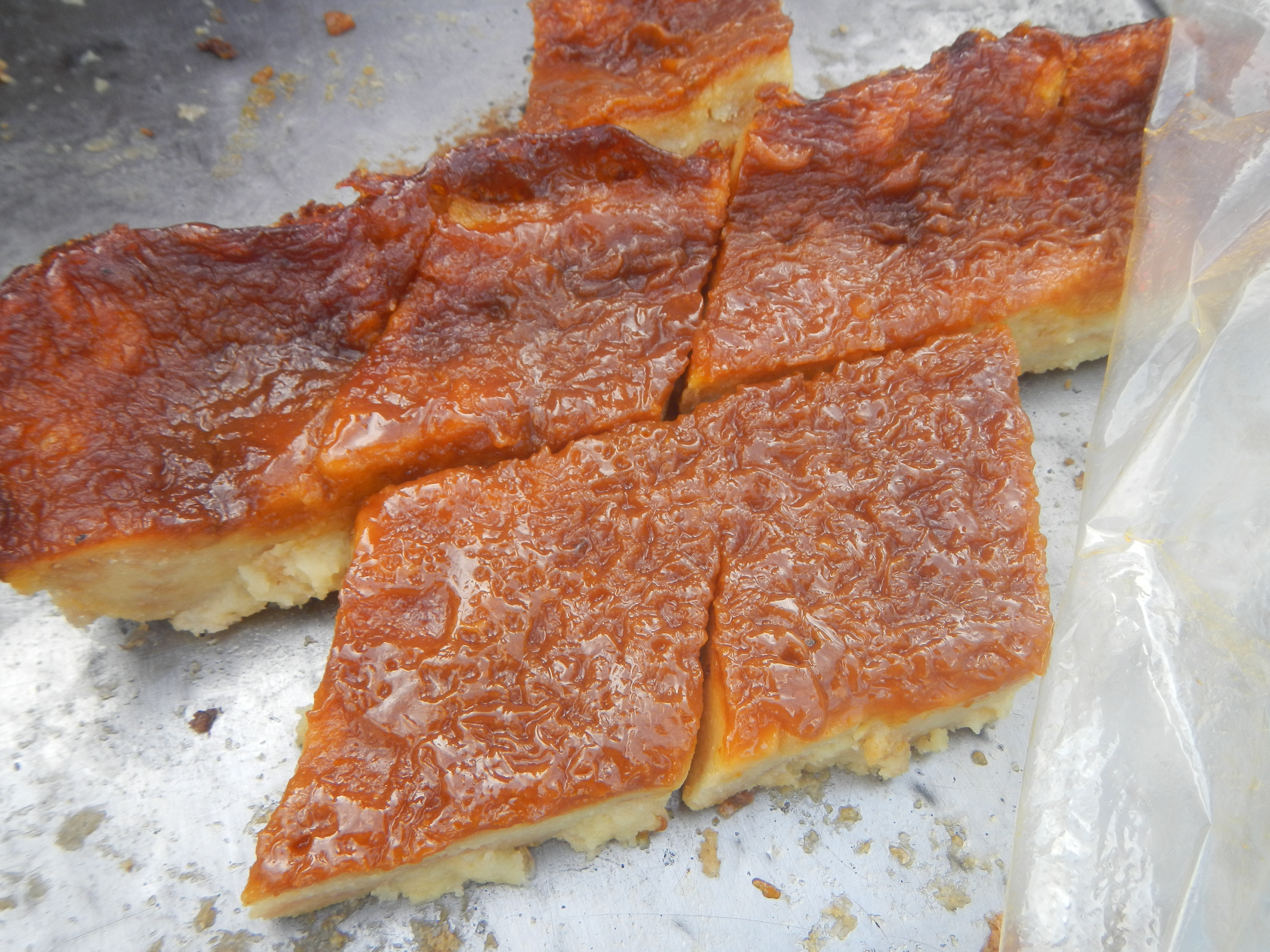
Diagonally-sliced cassava cake

Cassava cake can be modified to add additional ingredients. The most common variants are "cassava buko bibingka" which adds young coconut (buko), and "pineapple cassava bibingka" which adds crushed pineapple chunks.

In Vigan, Ilocos Sur, a local variant of cassava cake is known as "royal bibingka". They are shaped like cupcakes and are topped with cheese and margarine.

== Similar dishes ==
Cassava cake is very similar to the Vietnamese bánh khoai mì, which is sometimes also anglicized as "cassava cake", but the latter does not use milk and does not have a custard topping. Cassava cake also resembles the Caribbean and African cassava pone (also called yuca cake), but the latter is denser and dryer in texture.

== See also ==
- List of cakes
- Suman
- Pitsi-pitsi
