= Nuegado =

Sweet fried dumplings

Nuegados are a traditional plate from many countries in Hispanic America and many villages in La Mancha, Spain such as Valdepeñas, Membrilla and La Solana. Nuégados are "nothing more than fried dumplings coated with a sweet sugar cane sauce" or honey in La Mancha. To prepare nuégados, one deep fries a dough made of flour, vinegar, oil, eggs and salt, in oil. Honey is then poured on top of the dumplings. They are often eaten with coffee.

== Regional variations ==
=== El Salvador ===
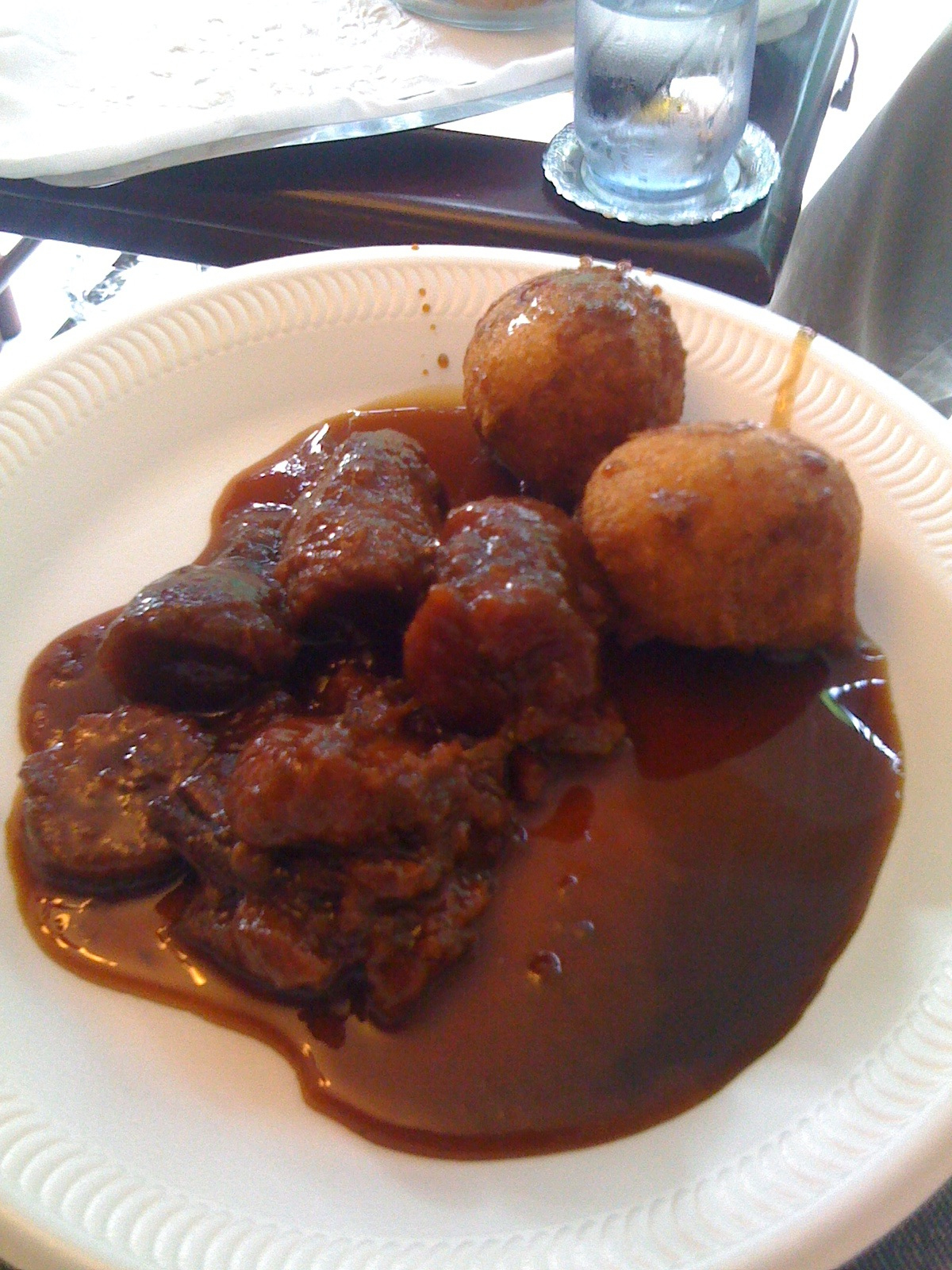
Nuegados served with banana and panela syrup in Santa Ana, El Salvador.

In El Salvador, nuégados salvadoreños are a popular traditional sweet dish. They are fritters or buñuelos usually made of yuca, sometimes maize, served with panela syrup and often accompanied with chilate; they are considered one of the emblematic dishes of Salvadoran cuisine. They are a typical sweet dish during Holy Week. Nuégados de yuca are prepared by processing yuca root into a soft dough with eggs and sometimes baking powder and Salvadoran hard cheese. The dough is formed into balls and may be slightly flattened and then fried until crispy. The syrup is made with panela flavored with cinnamon.

In the town of Atiquizaya, nuégados boca de cántaro are a distinct type of sweet from the usual Salvadoran recipe. They are pastries of thin fried dough formed into the cylindrical shape of a pitcher's mouth, hence the name, covered with panela syrup.

=== Guatemala ===
Guatemalan nuégados are a traditional sweet of glazed fried dough balls. They are a popular sweet during patronal festivals and are sold stuck together formed into small towers of nuégados. The dough may be flavored with orange or aniseed and the glaze is usually made of refined sugar, but panela syrup is also used. To form the towers in which they are sold, the nuégados are stacked atop a base of three while allowing the glaze to stick them together.

=== Honduras ===
Honduran nuéganos, as they are often called along with nuégados, are fritters of yuca or masa served with panela syrup, similar to Salvadoran nuégados, though here they are often formed in the shape of a ring doughnut; these ring-shaped fritters may also be called rosquillas en dulce or rosquillas en miel. They are a popular sweet during Holy Week and other festivities.

=== Mexico ===
In Chiapas, nuégados chiapanecos, also called dulce de nuégado or nuéganos, are a traditional sweet. A dough is made with flour, and eggs, sometimes lard and salt is added, and is left to fluff; the dough is then cut into pieces, and made into balls, or stretched and flattened, before being fried in hot lard or oil. A syrup is made with sugar into which the nuégados are mixed until glazed. These are then sprinkled with red-colored sugar.

==== Muéganos ====
In Central Mexico, especially Puebla and Tlaxcala, as well as in San Luis Potosí, they are known as muéganos and have a more distinct form compared to other regional varieties. In Puebla, they are traditionally consumed from December to Easter. Preparation of muéganos starts similar to nuégados from La Mancha, Spain and Chiapas, but they are formed into squares or rombos rather than balls. The fried muéganos are then stuck together using a thick piloncillo syrup, flavored with cinnamon.

Another type of muégano prepared in Mexico is made with corn masa mixed with cheese, baking powder, salt, and milk. The masa is formed into balls and pressed down into a kind of disk. This is then fried and covered with piloncillo syrup.

Muéganos huamantlecos are a traditional sweet of Huamantla, Tlaxcala, and are distinct from the other Mexican muéganos; their preparation was made an official cultural and gastronomic heritage of the State of Tlaxcala in September 2020. It is typical for locals to consume them along with lemon sorbet. Here the dough cubes are baked; these cubes are put through the similar process of being covered in piloncillo syrup but they are then placed between colored obleas. These are then usually sprinkled with cinnamon.

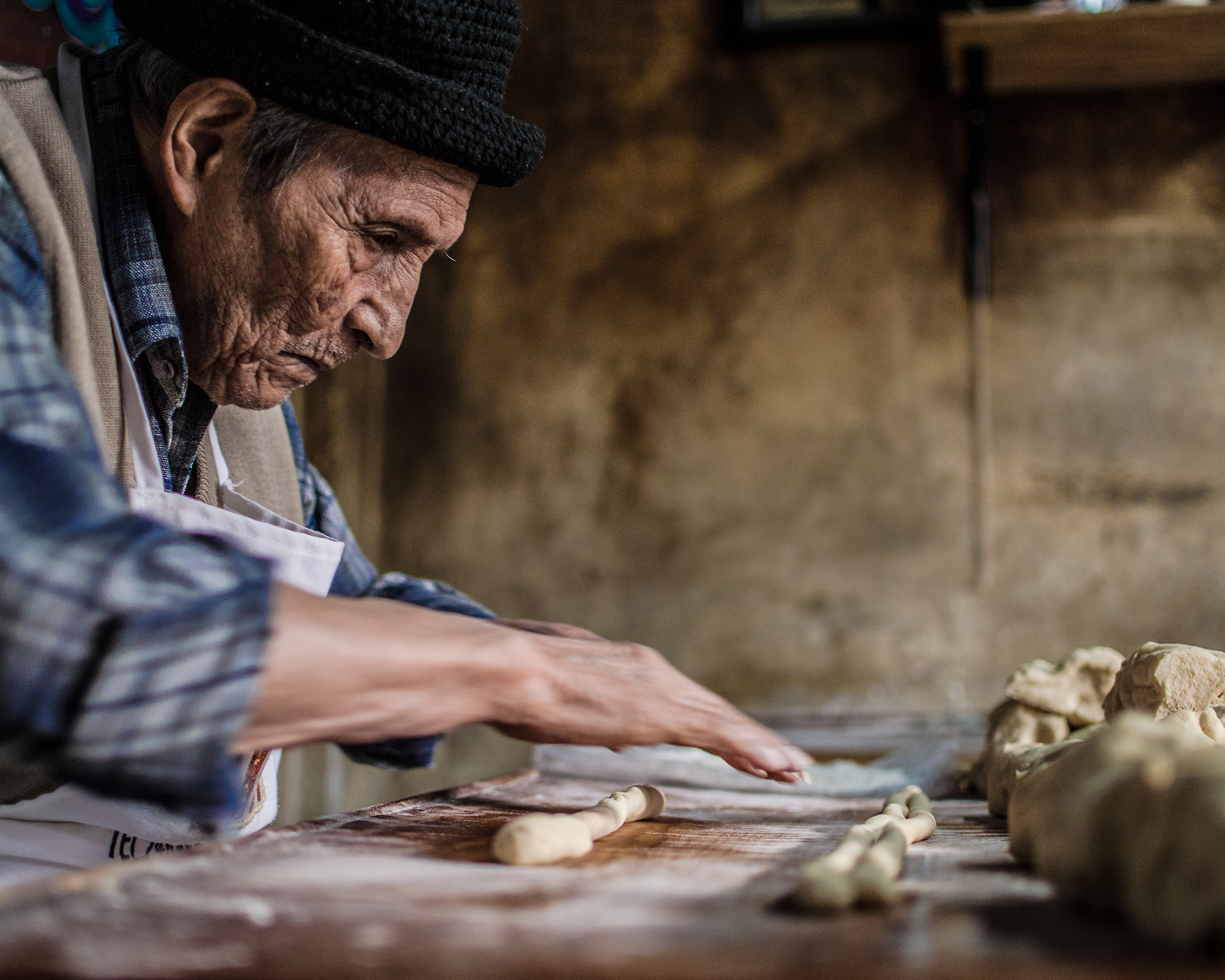
Dough for muéganos being rolled by a traditional artisan in Chiautempan, Tlaxcala.

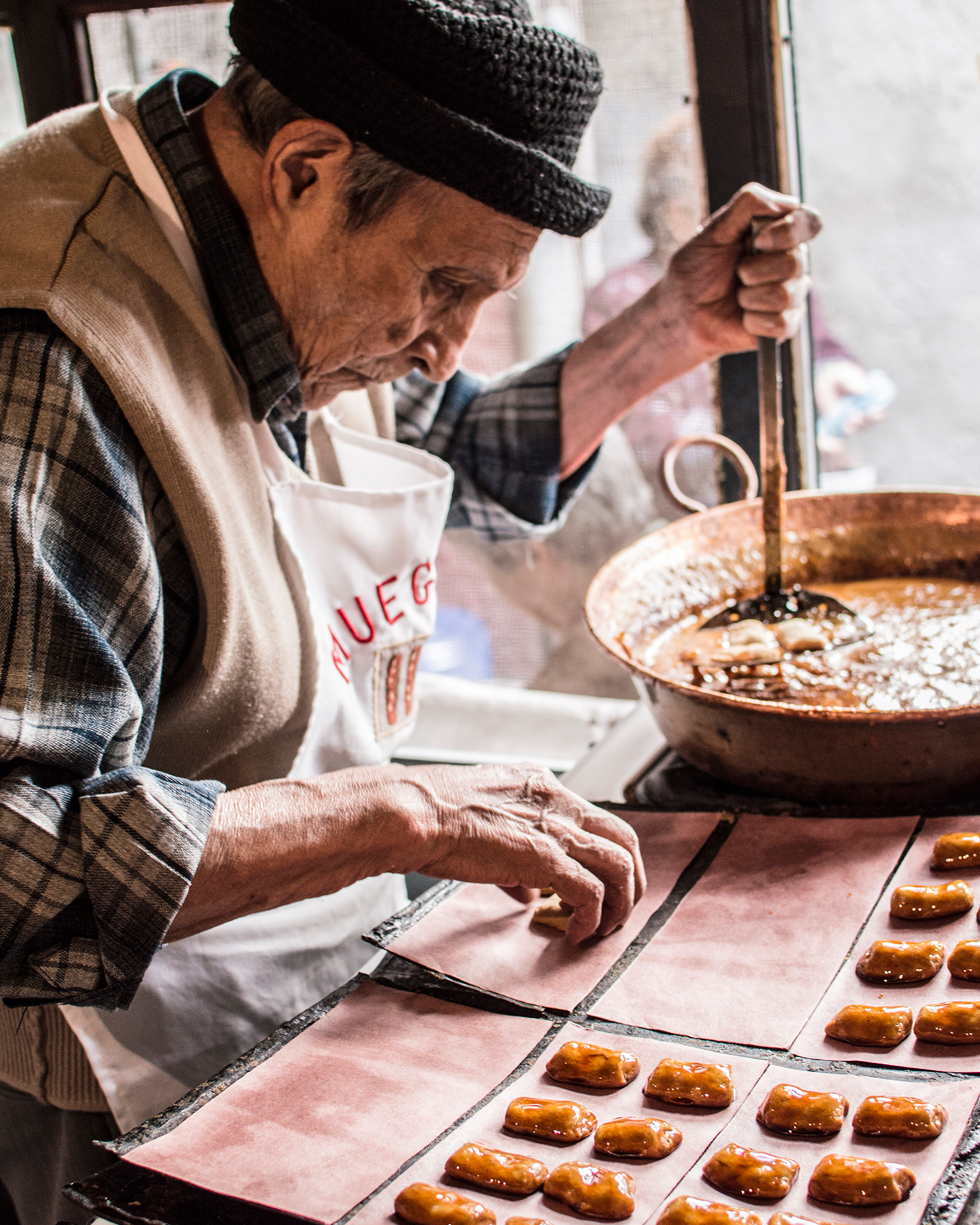
Individual muéganos set before being stuck together.

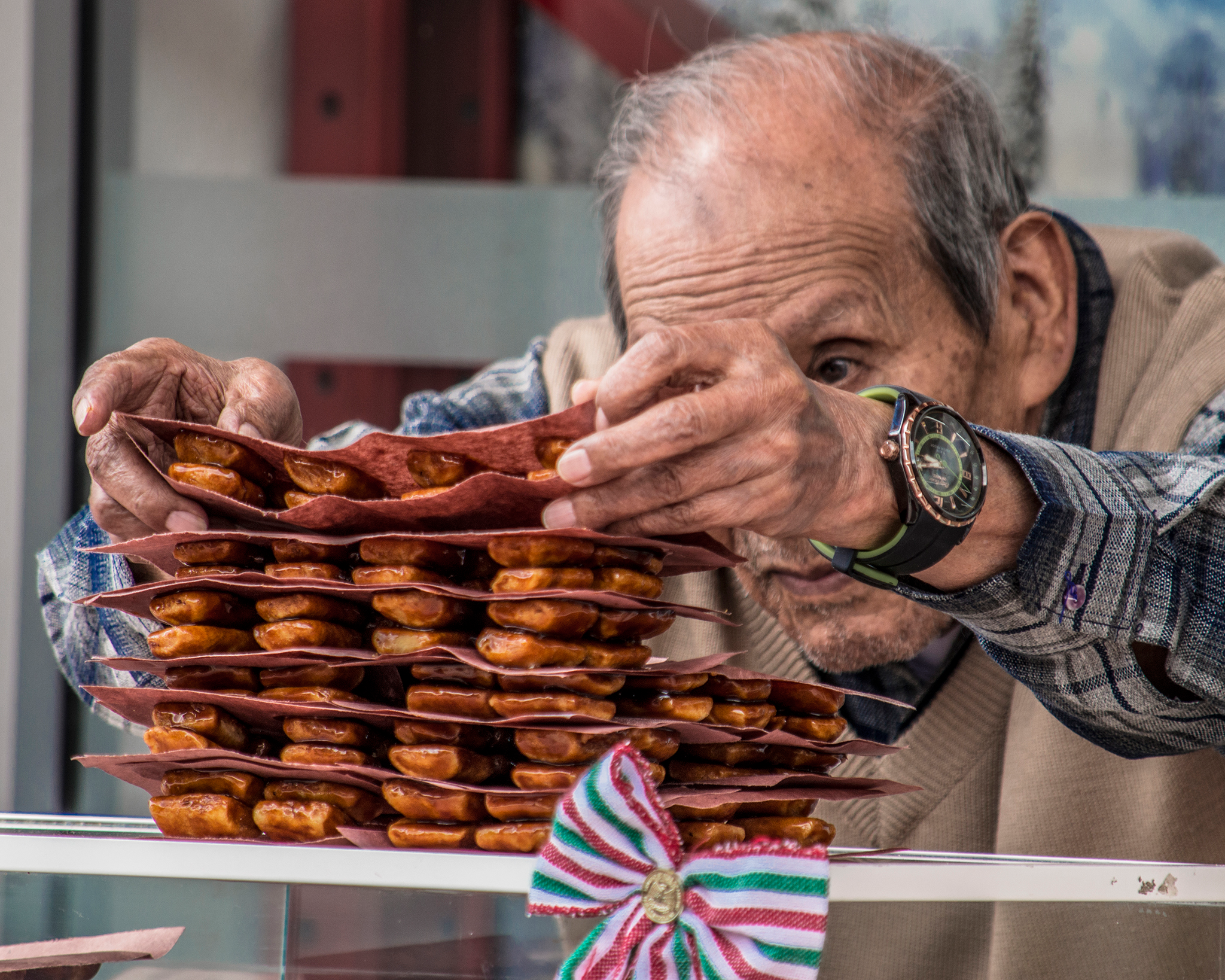
Muéganos being stuck together.

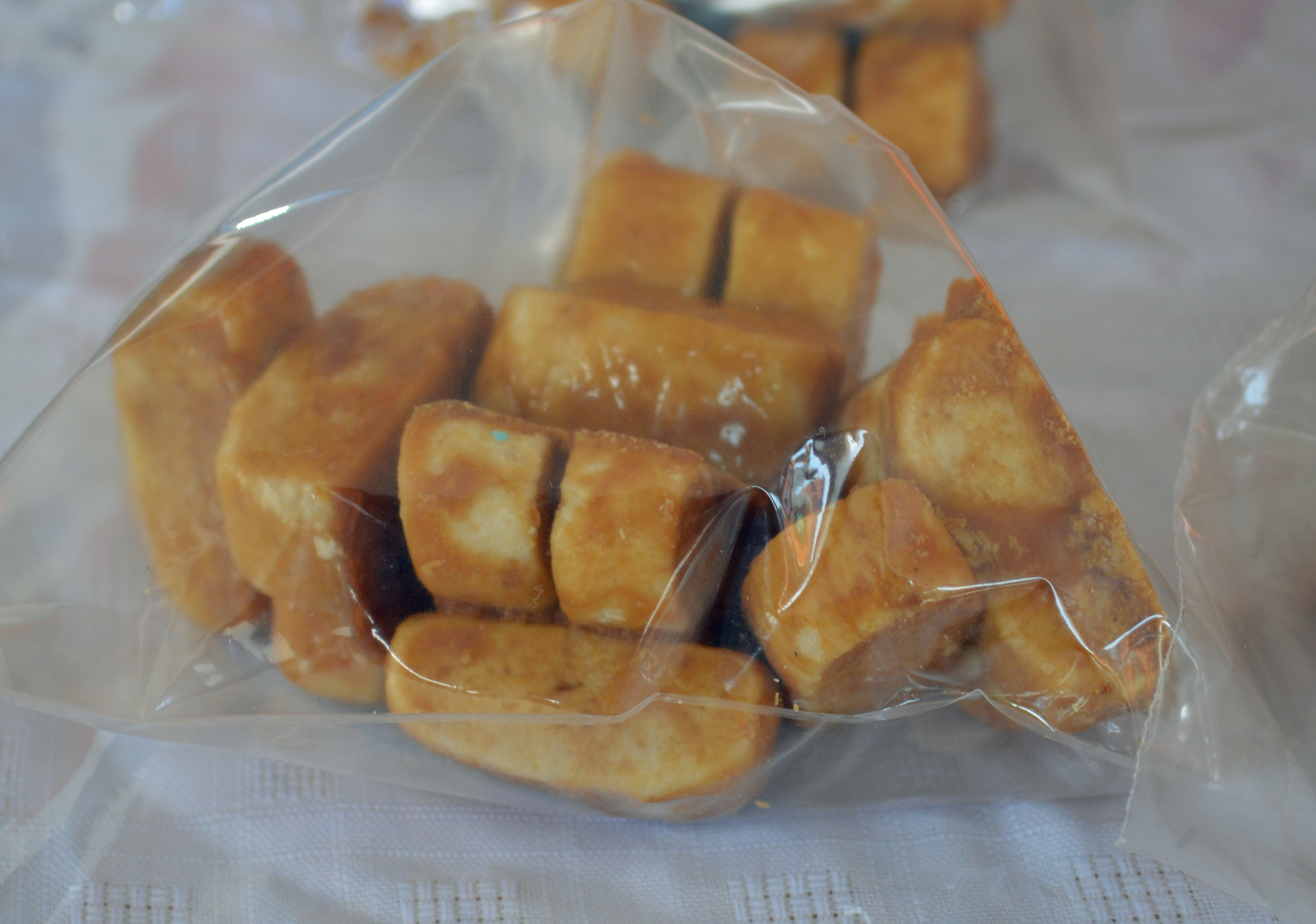
Typical muéganos, prepared and wrapped, being sold in a market in Huamantla, Tlaxcala.

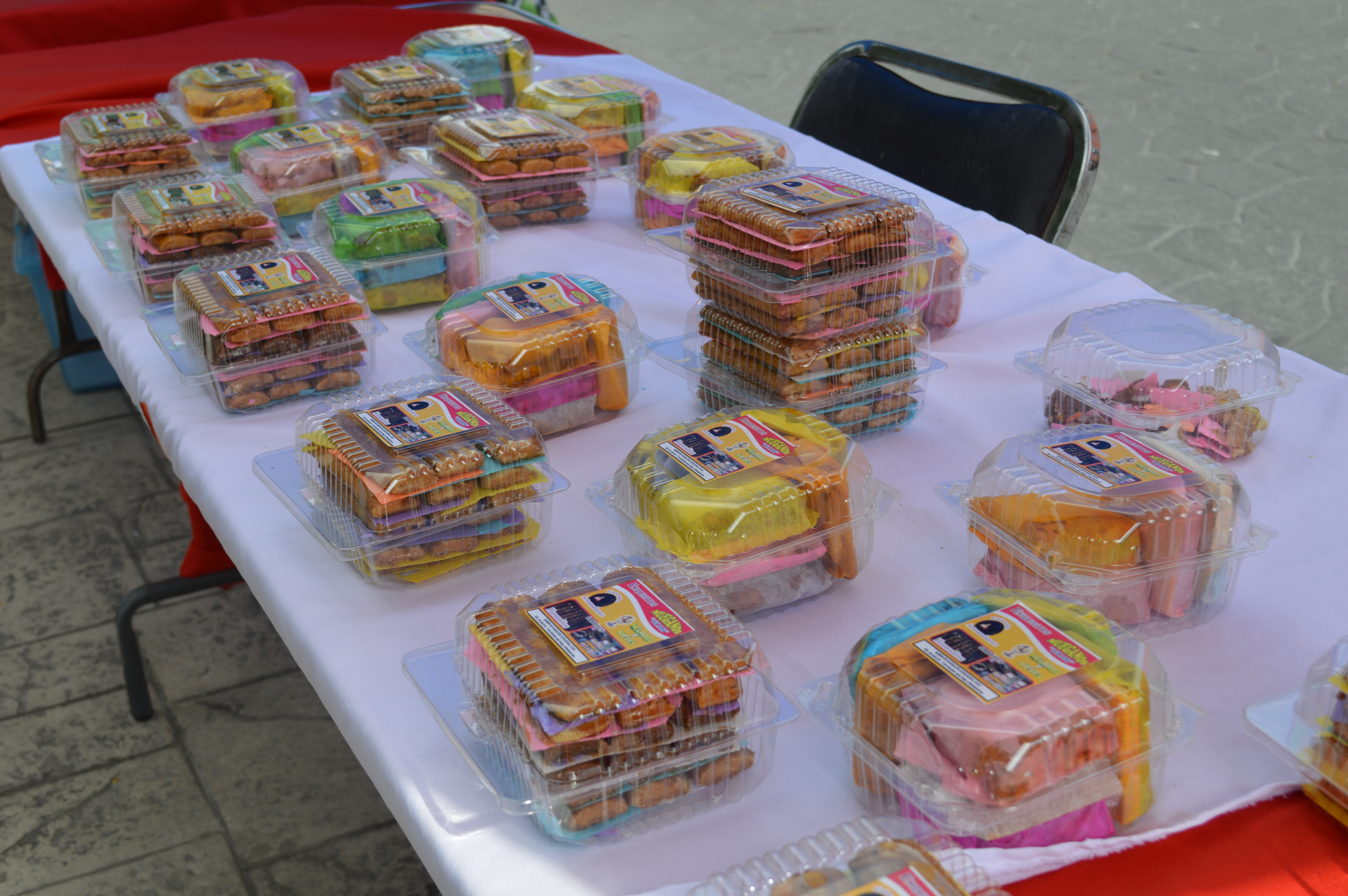
Muéganos huamantlecos sold in Huamantla.

=== Spain ===
In Castilla–La Mancha, especially in Valdepeñas, nuégados manchegos, also known as rosca de nuégados, roscapiña, and roscatrera, are a popular sweet; they are traditionally consumed during All Saints' Day celebrations along with other sweets like the similar buñuelos. They are said to have roots in Al-Andalus. Recipes vary slightly between localities and families, but they are generally made by mixing wheat, eggs, fried oil, lemon zest, vinegar and sugar into a dough, sometimes aniseed or anise liquor is added; the dough is kneaded and formed into balls which are then fried. These fried balls are then mixed with hot, caramelized honey until each one is fully covered, and they are then served arranged in the form of a rosca.

== See also ==
- Buñuelo
- Mexican cuisine
- Salvadoran cuisine
- Spanish cuisine
