= Bánh khoai mì =

Vietnamese cassava cake

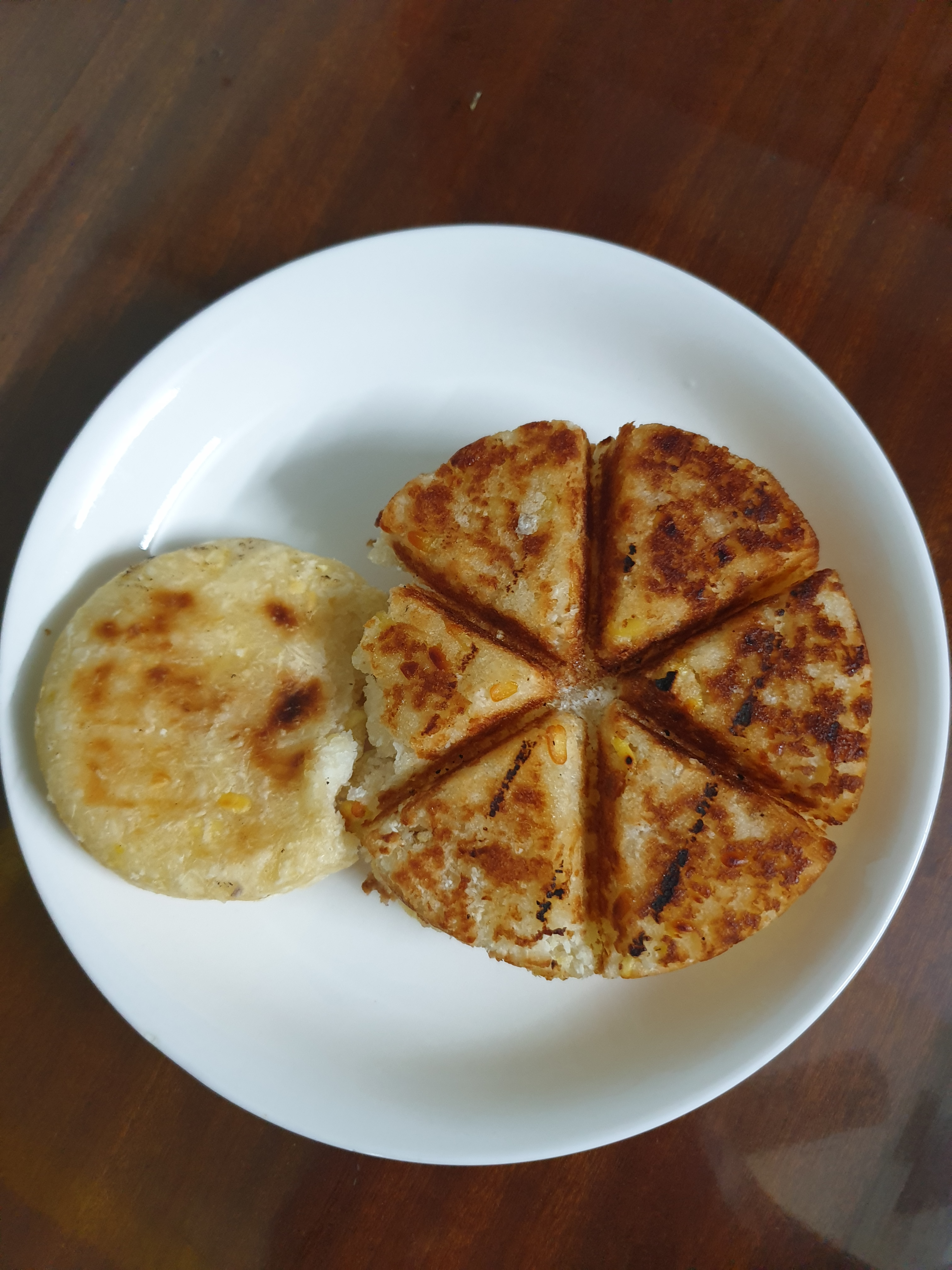
- Type: Cake
- Course: Dessert, snack
- Place of origin: Vietnam
- Region or state: Southeast Asia
- Main ingredients: Cassava, sugar, coconut milk
- Variations: Bánh khoai mì nướng, Bánh khoai mì hấp
- Similar dishes: Cassava cake, Bibingka, Pilawpinan mont

Bánh khoai mì is a Vietnamese cake made from grated cassava, sugar, coconut milk, and a small amount of salt.

There are two varieties:

- Bánh khoai mì nướng - baked
- Bánh khoai mì hấp - steamed (much less common)

A similar cake made from taro is called bánh khoai môn.

Bánh khoai mì is similar to the cassava cake of the Philippines. The Filipino dish, however, differs in its top layer, which is traditionally custard, and in its use of milk as an ingredient.
