= Bile up =

Belize dish

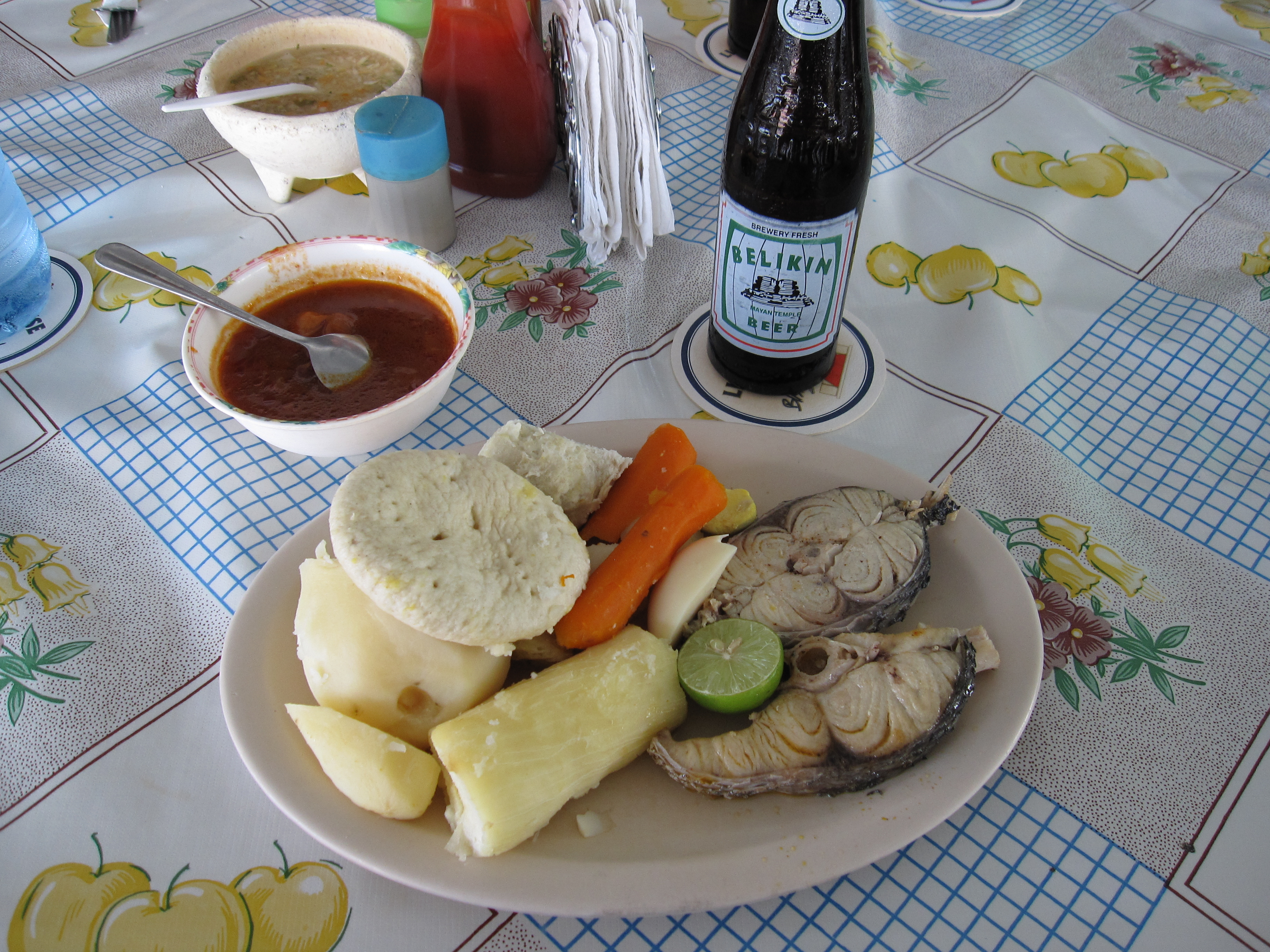
A Belizean bile-up

The bile up (or boil-up) is considered the cultural dish of the Kriols of Belize. It is a combination of boiled eggs, fish and/or pig tail, with cassava, yams, or sweet potatoes, plantains, and tomato sauce.
