= Muchines de yuca =

Ecuadorian cassava fritter

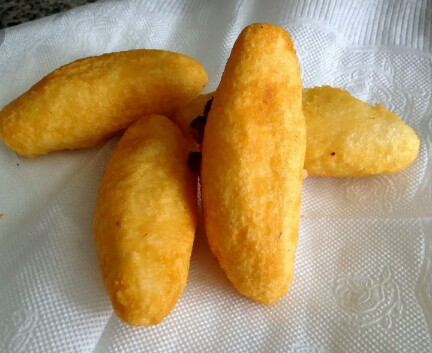
- Muchines de yuca
- Type: Fritter
- Place of origin: Ecuador
- Region or state: Coastal region
- Associated cuisine: Ecuador
- Serving temperature: Hot or room temperature
- Main ingredients: Cassava, egg yolk, cheese, chopped onion, oil

Muchines de yuca are a typical dish from Ecuador. Its main component is cassava, a tuber with high energy properties, which grows in the coastal region of Ecuador. Although it is widely present in the coastal region, it is very popular in Ambato, where it is consumed as part of breakfast.

== Description ==
The cassava is cooked with salt for approximately 30 minutes. Once cooked, it is mashed with egg yolk and given an oval shape, a filling of cheese and chopped onion is placed inside, and it is fried in hot oil until golden brown.

It is usually consumed with honey and accompanied by a drink of canelazo or coffee.
