= Salvadoran cuisine =

Culinary traditions of El Salvador

Salvadoran cuisine is a style of cooking derived from the nation of El Salvador. The indigenous foods consist of a mix of Amerindian cuisine from groups such as the Lenca, Pipil, Maya Poqomam, Maya Chʼortiʼ, Alaguilac and Cacaopera peoples and some African influences. Many of the dishes are made with maize (corn). There is also heavy use of pork and seafood. European ingredients were incorporated after the Spanish conquest.

El Salvador's most notable dish is the pupusa, a thick handmade, tortilla-like corn flour or rice flour flatbread stuffed with cheese, chicharrón (cooked pork meat ground to a paste consistency), refried beans or loroco (a vine flower bud native to Central America). There are also vegetarian options, often with ayote (a type of squash), mora (Solanum nigrum, a type of nightshade plant native to Eurasia), or garlic. Some restaurants even offer pupusas stuffed with shrimp or spinach which are served with salsa roja, a cooked tomato sauce, often served with curtido.

Pollo encebollado is another popular Salvadoran dish that contains chicken braised with onions. Salvadoran cheeses queso duro (hard cheese), queso fresco (fresh cheese), and cuajada are also eaten with meals.

Two other typical Salvadoran dishes are yuca frita and panes rellenos. Yuca frita is deep-fried cassava root served with curtido (a pickled cabbage, onion and carrot topping) and chicharron with pepesca (fried baby sardines). The yuca is sometimes served boiled instead of fried. Panes rellenos ("stuffed bread") are warm submarine sandwiches. The turkey or chicken is marinated and then roasted with Pipil spices and hand-pulled. This sandwich is traditionally served with turkey or chicken, tomato, and watercress along with cucumber and cabbage.

Other well-known Salvadoran dishes include carne guisada (saucy beef with potatoes and carrots), lomo entomatado (beef with tomatoes), carne asada (grilled steak, usually served with a type of Salvadoran salsa called chimol), pasteles de carne (meat pies), pollo guisado con hongos (chicken with mushrooms), pacaya planta (palm flowers breaded in cornmeal, fried and served with tomato sauce), pavo salvadoreño (roast turkey with sauce, often eaten for Christmas), ceviche de camarones (lime-cooked shrimp), and pescado empanizado (breaded, fried fish fillets). Salvadoran chorizo is short, fresh (not dried) and tied into twin sausages.

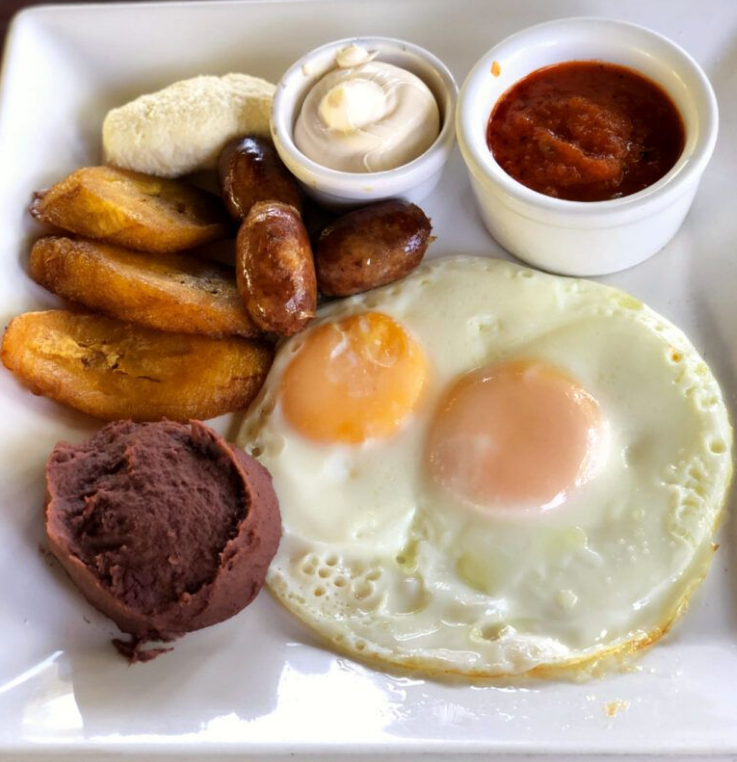
Typical Salvadoran breakfast: egg, beans, cream, plantain and chorizo

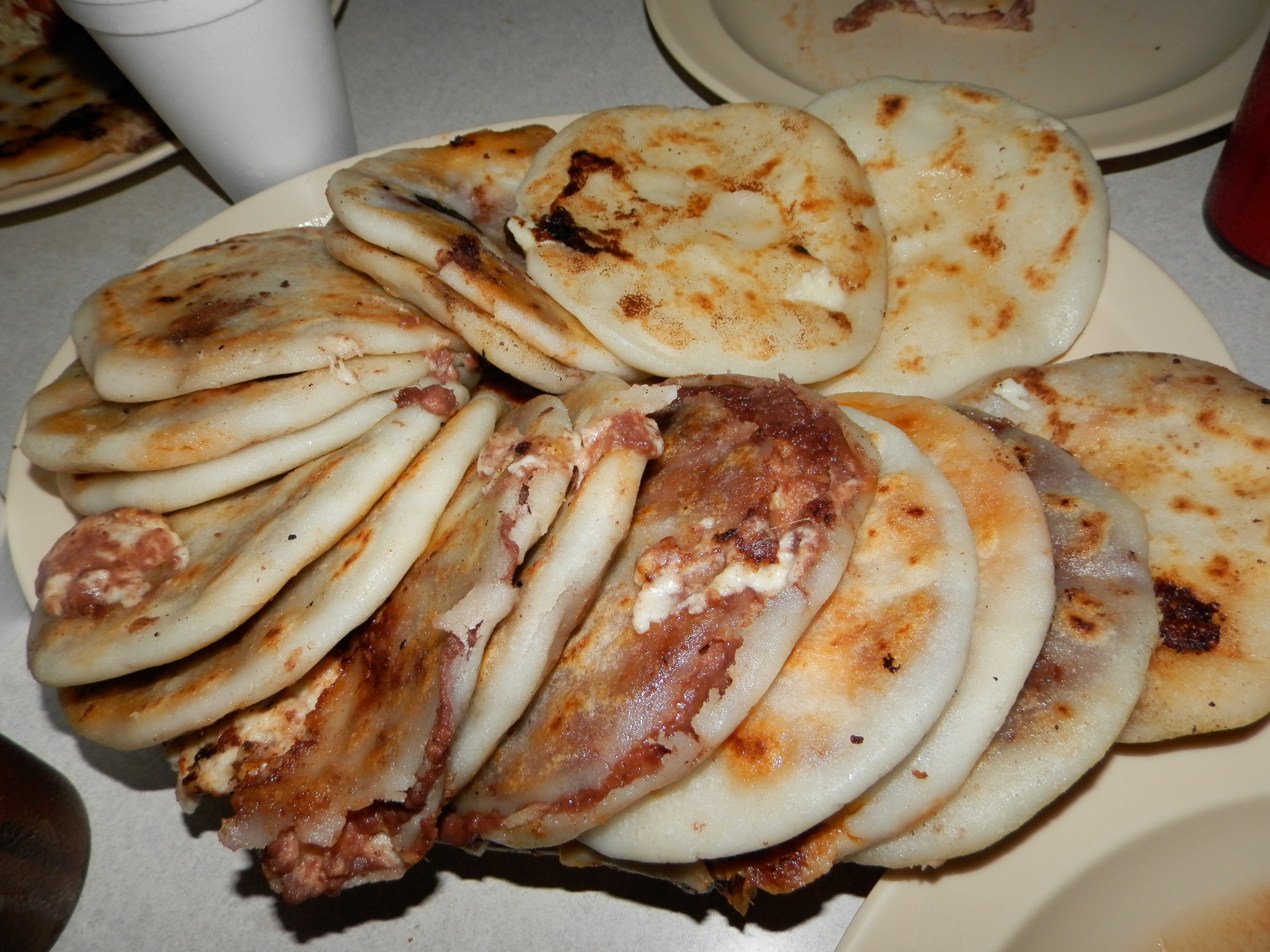
The pupusa is a Mesoamerican dish of Pipil origin. The oldest direct evidence of pupusa preparations in the world comes from a 1,400-year-old Maya site, Joya de Cerén, in El Salvador.

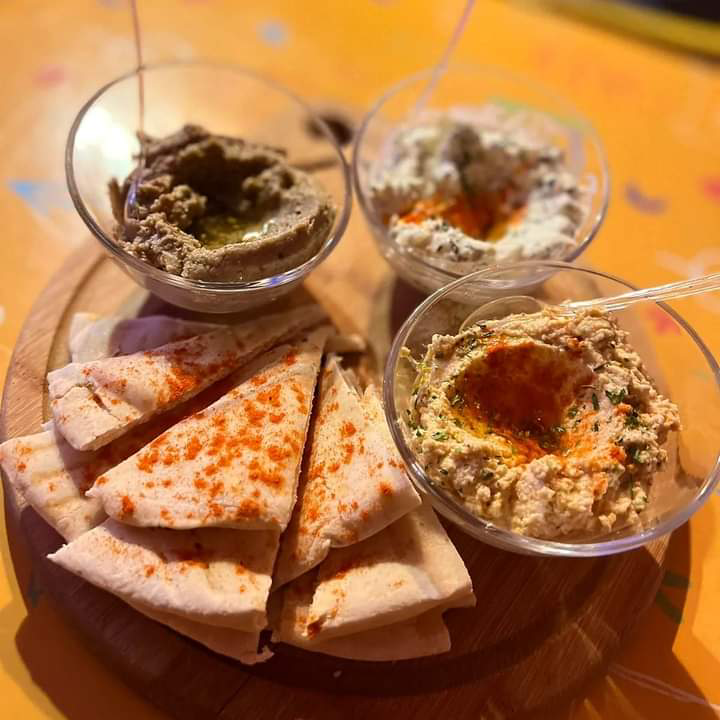
Palestinian Salvadoran hummus and pita, Teklebab, Palestinian–Turkish restaurant in Santa Tecla, El Salvador

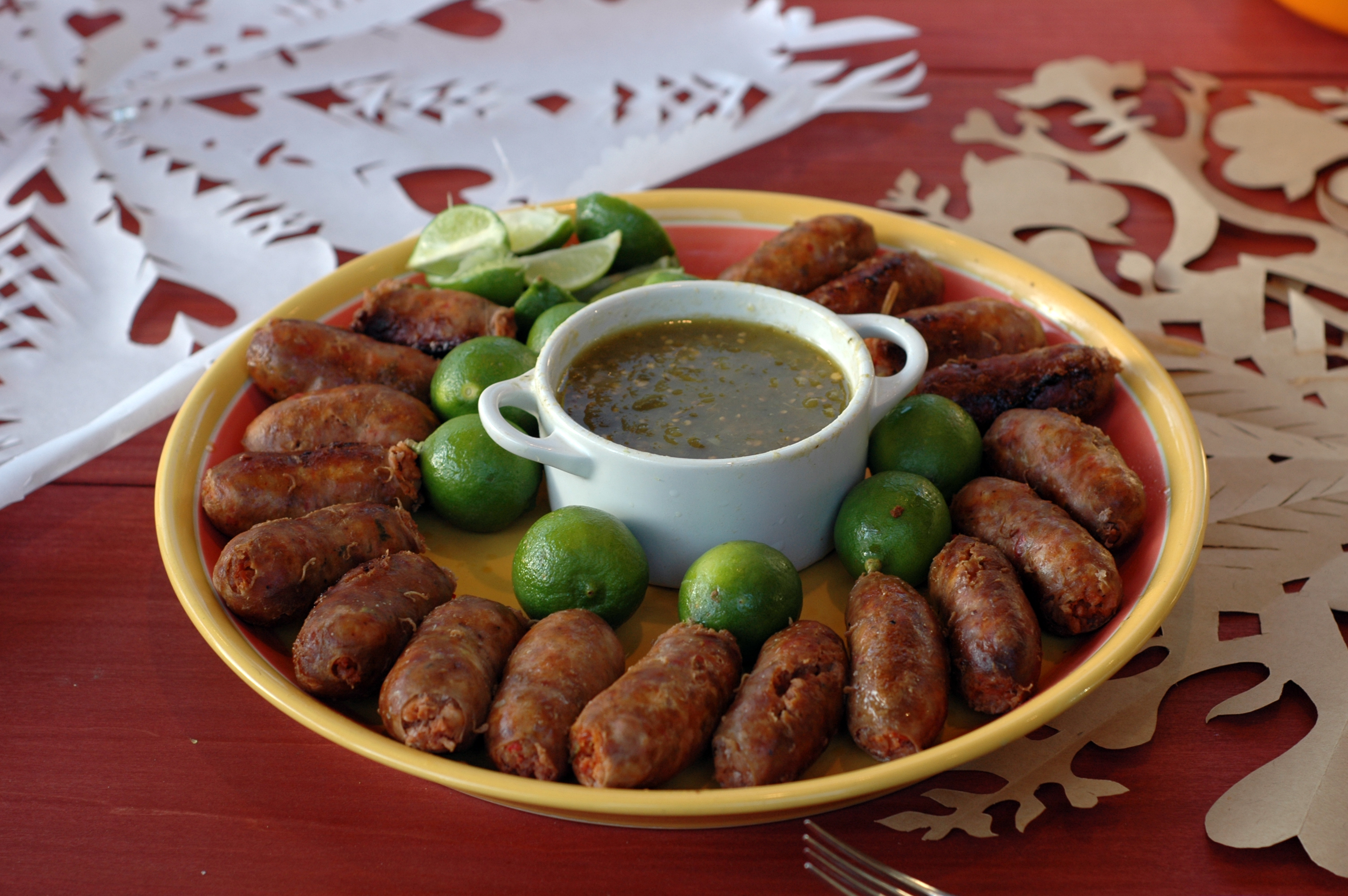
Salvadoran chorizo with lime and a dip

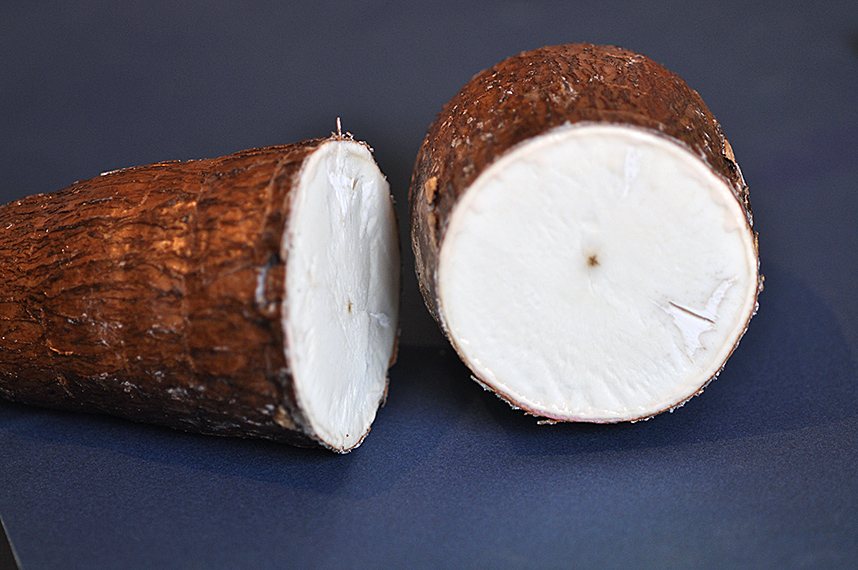
Yuca is eaten fried or boiled with salads, as a side dish or in yuca frita. As with pupusa consumption, the oldest direct evidence of cassava cultivation comes from Joya de Cerén.

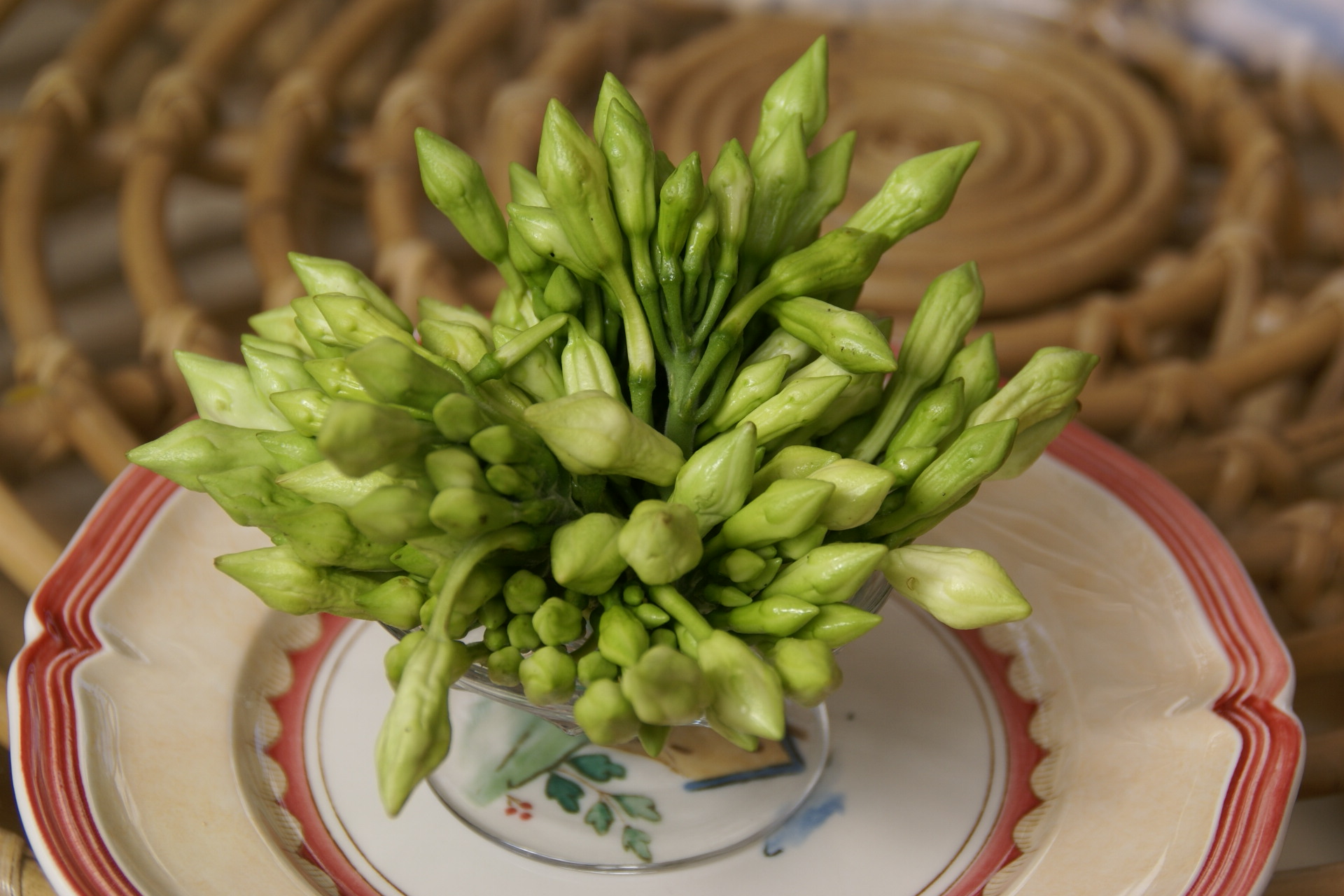
Loroco is a Mesoamerican plant widely used in Salvadoran dishes such as pupusas.

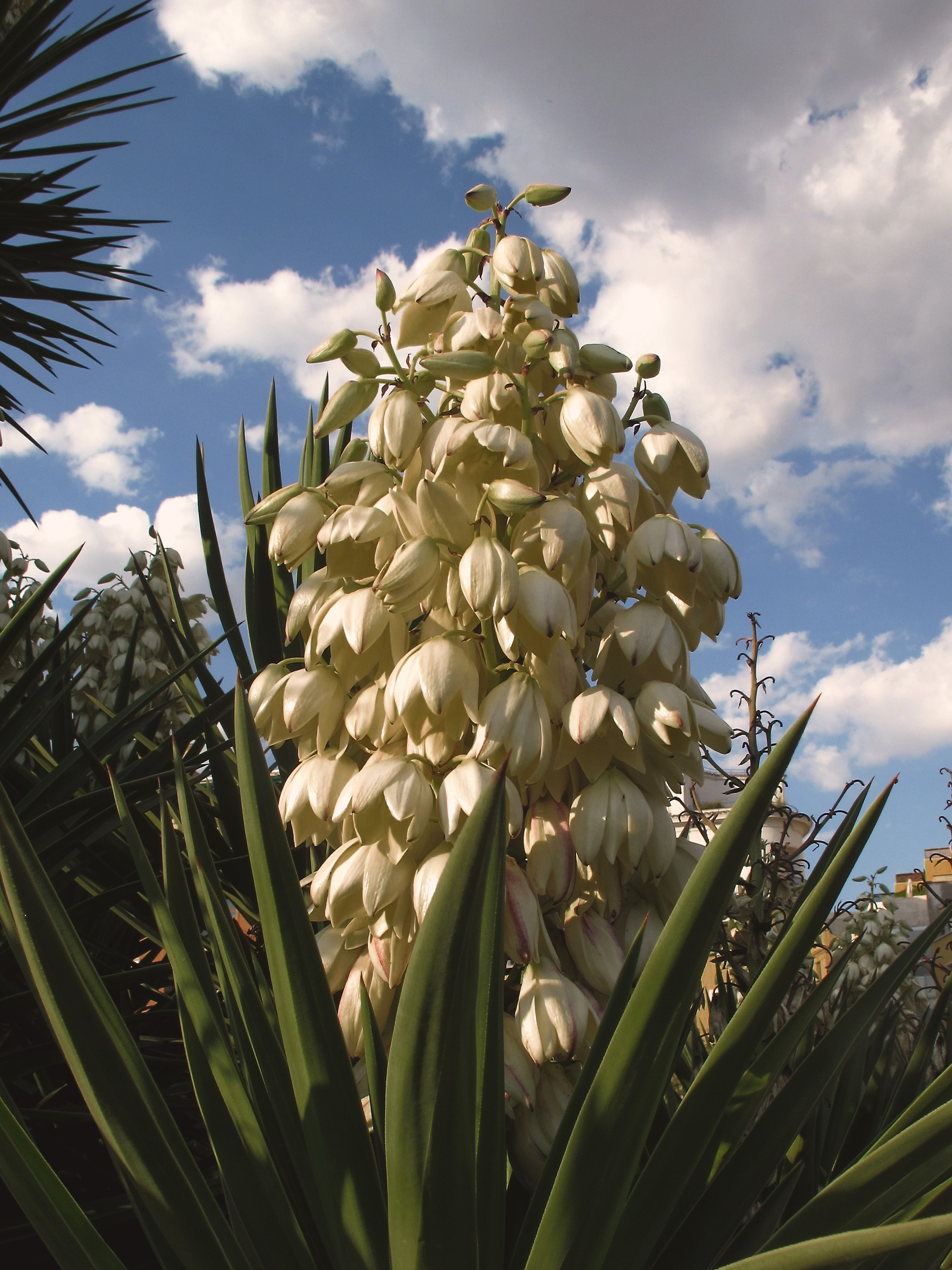
Izote flower is a Mesoamerican flower widely used in Salvadoran cuisine. It is often mixed with scrambled eggs or lemon.

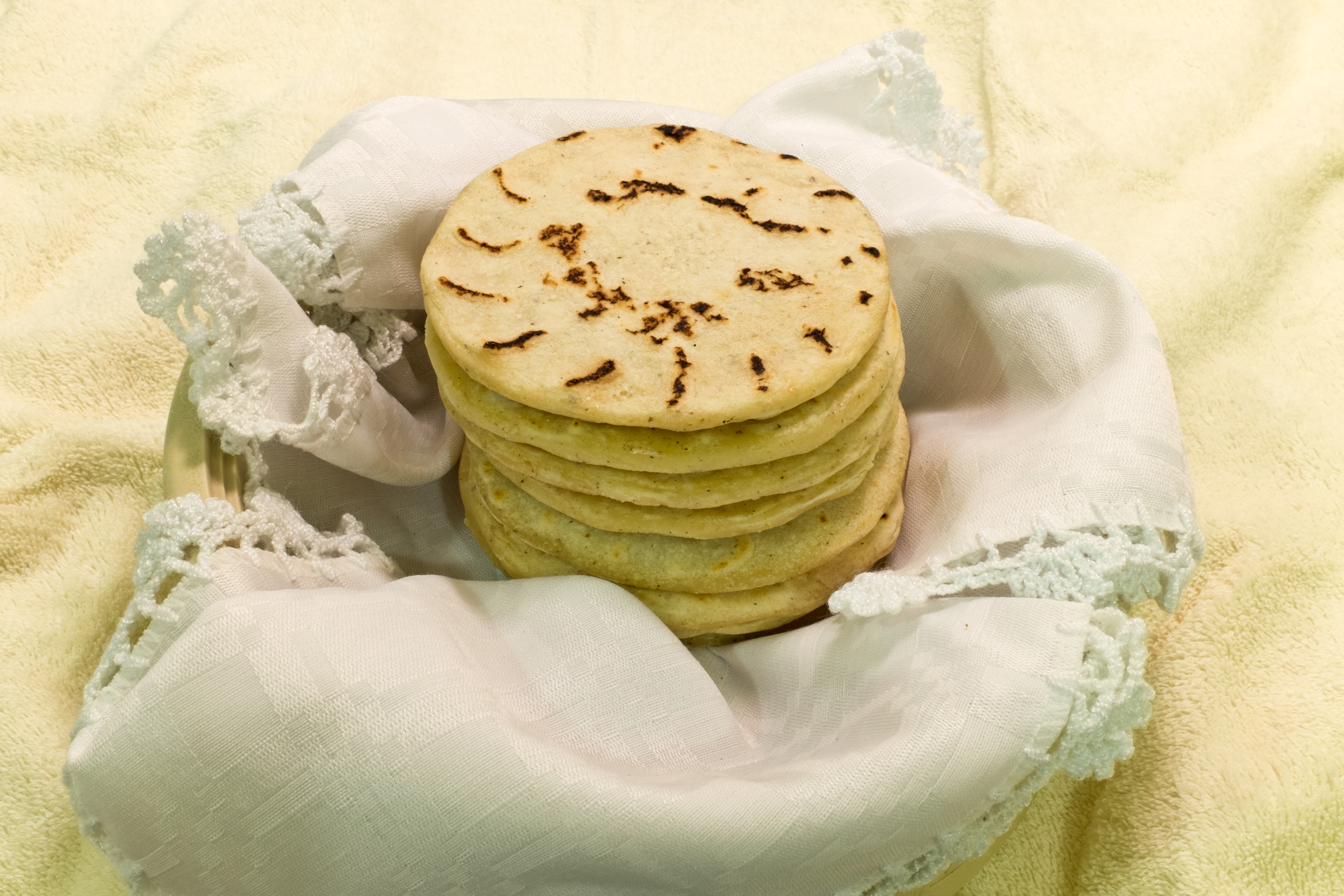
Salvadoran tortillas are a staple of the Salvadoran diet. These are thicker (5 mm) than Mexican tortillas, about 10 cm in diameter.

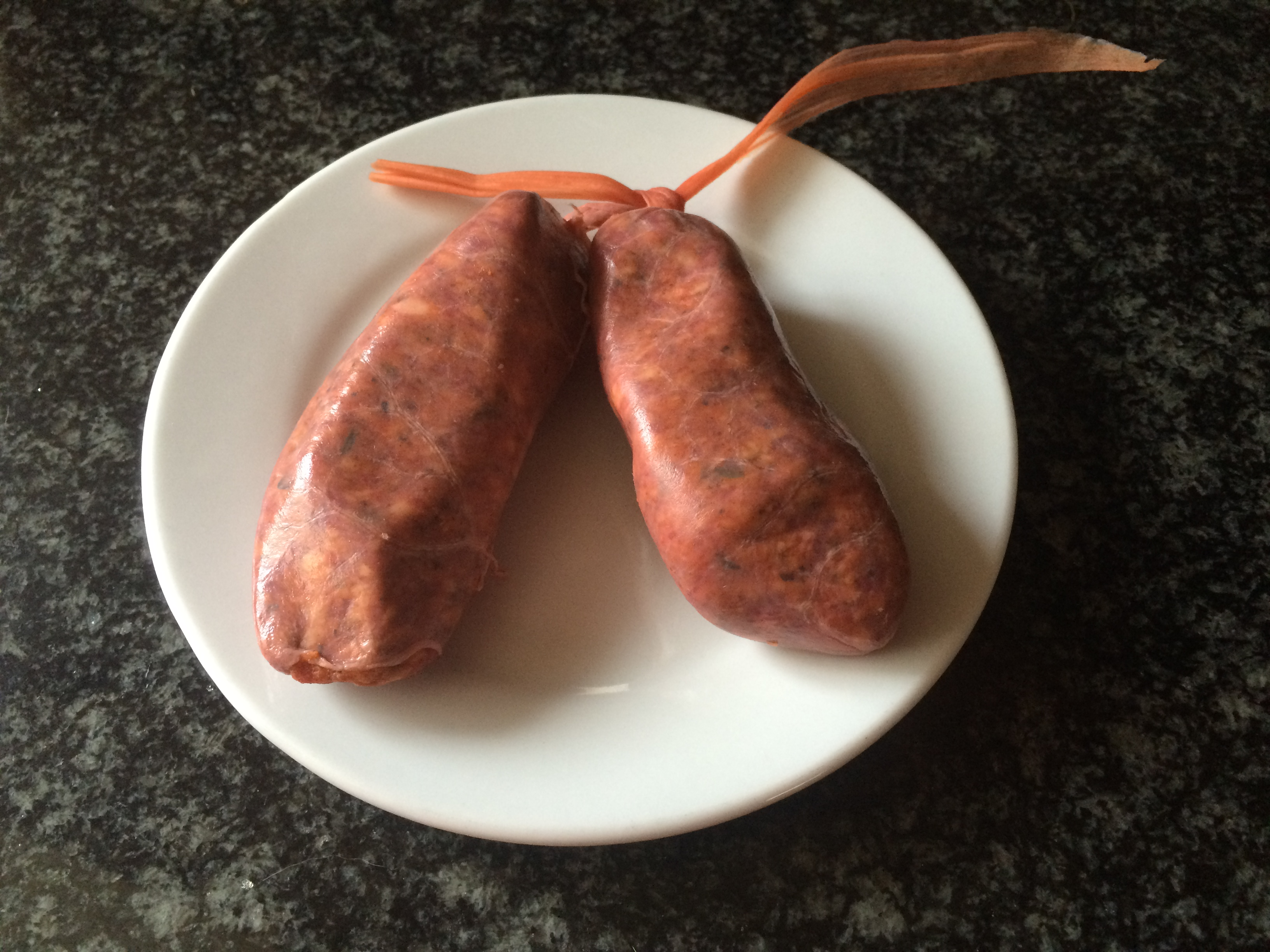
Salvadoran-style chorizo

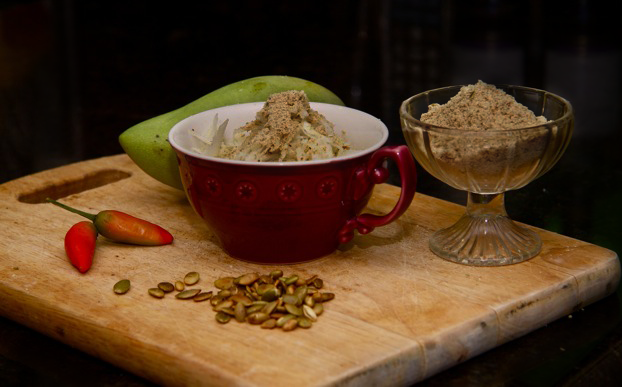
Alguashte is a seasoning made from ground pumpkin seeds. Alguashte likely has Mayan origins.

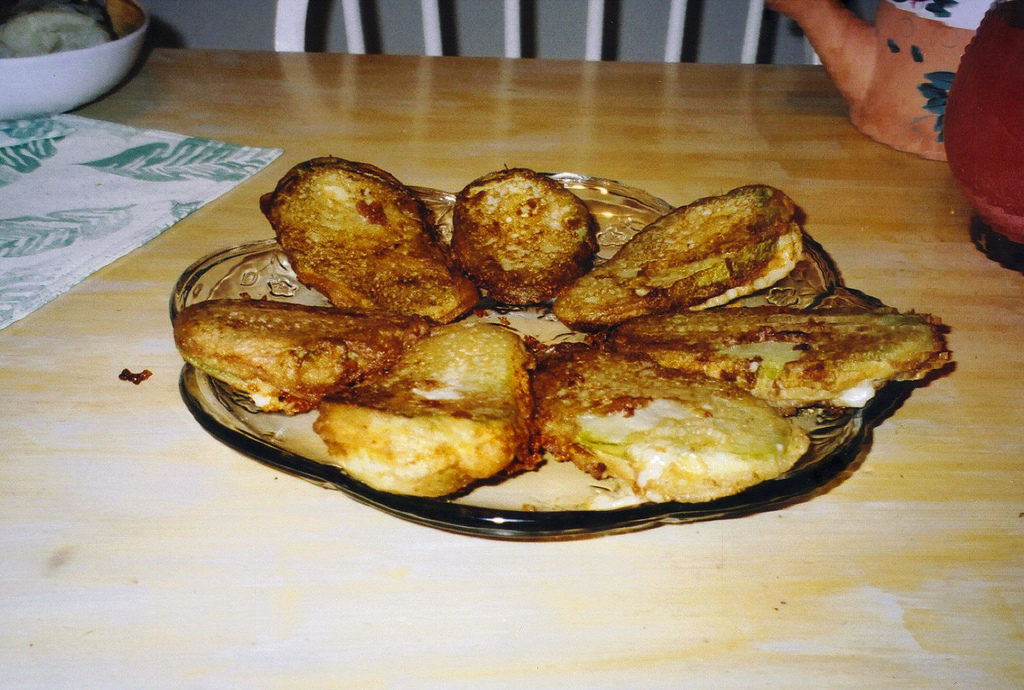
Güisquil filled with melted cheese

== Types of tamales ==
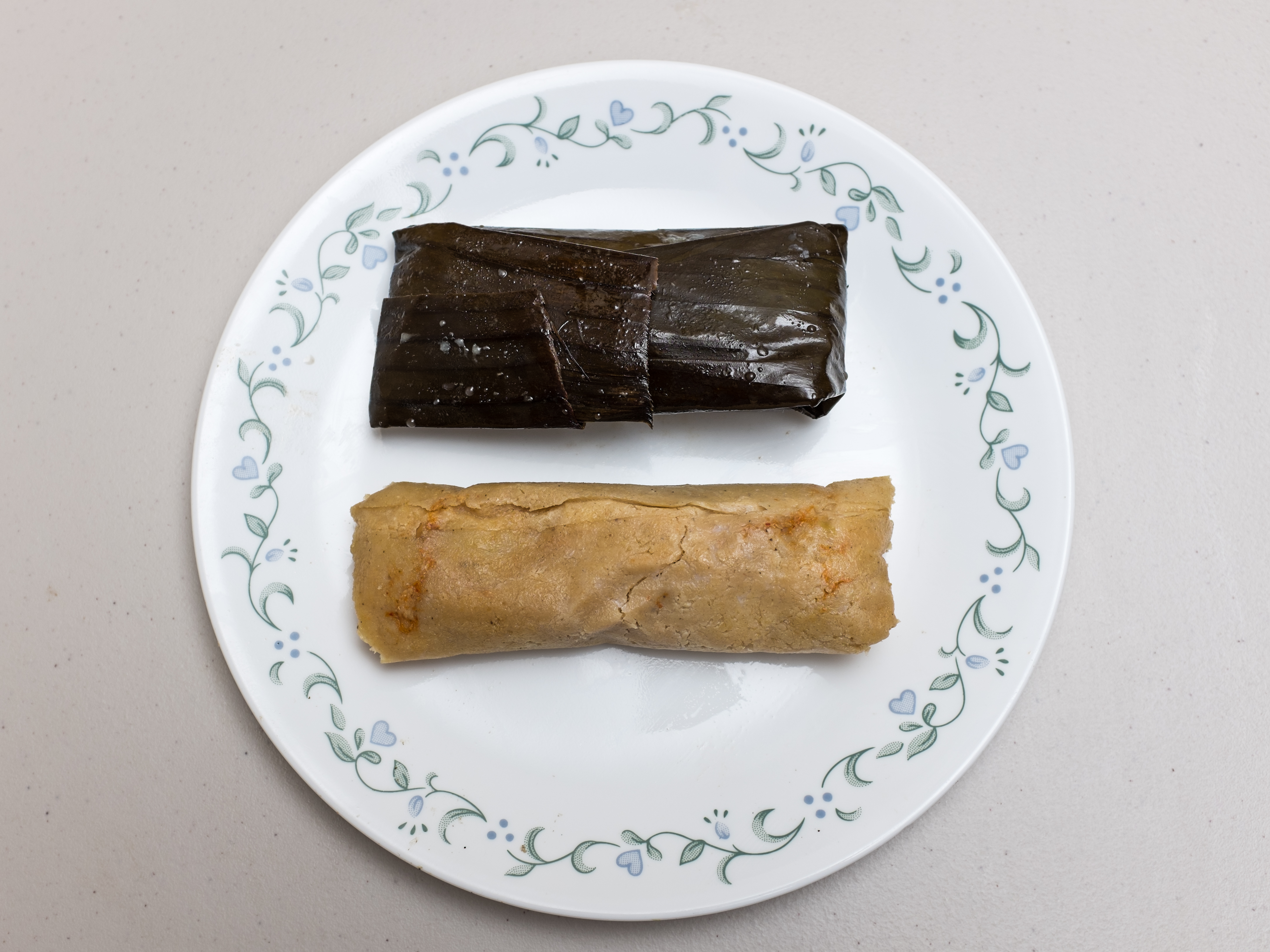
Salvadoran chicken tamales

El Salvador is known for different types of tamales, which are usually wrapped in plantain leaves. These tamales include:

- Tamales de elote (fresh corn cakes)
- Tamales pisques (tamales stuffed with black beans)
- Tamales de pollo (tamales stuffed with chicken and potatoes)
- Ticucos ("travelers' tamales")

== Soups ==
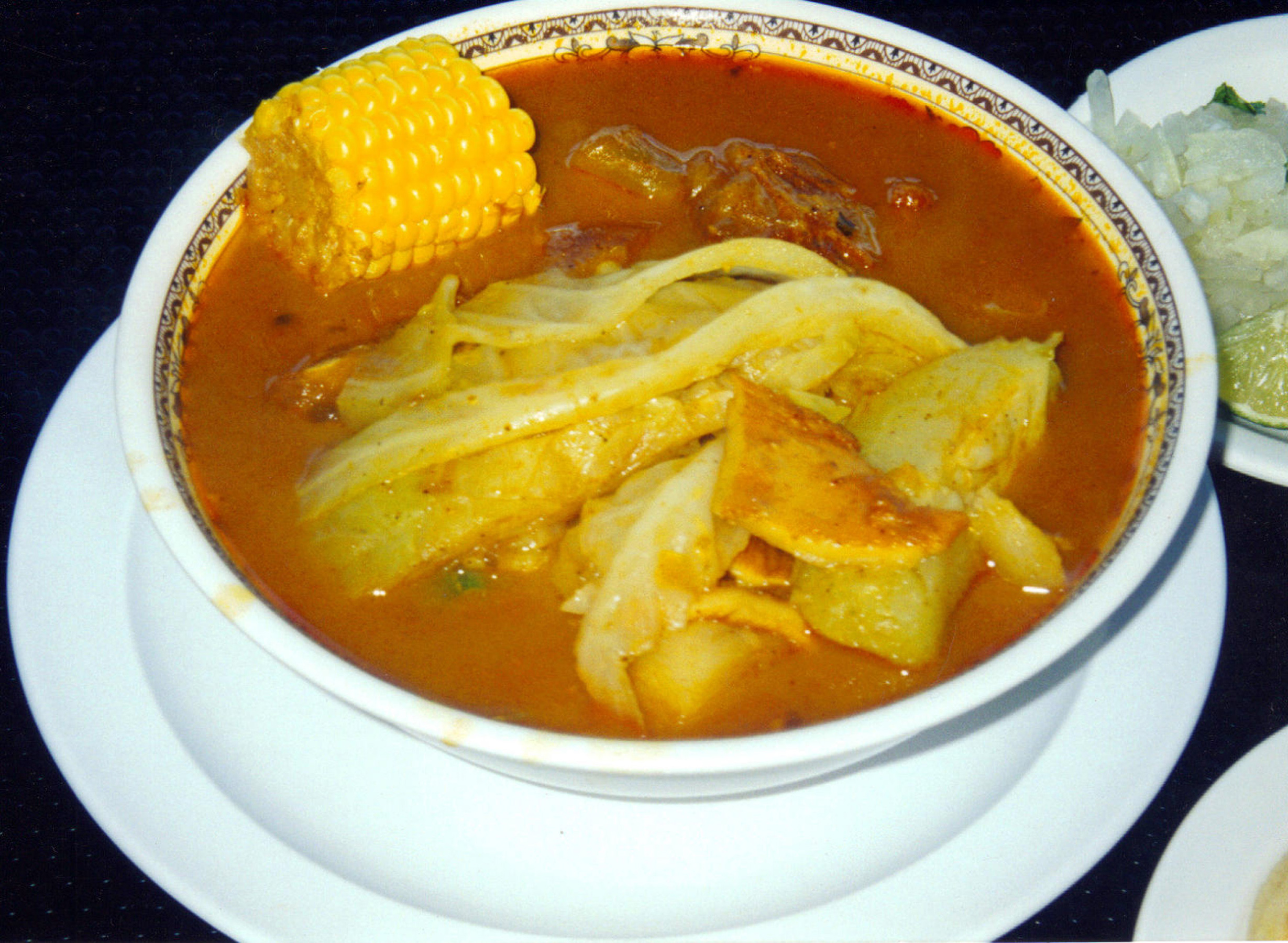
Sopa de pata

Soups are popular among Salvadorans of every social level.

Sopa de pata is a soup made from the tripe of a cow, plantain, corn, tomatoes, cabbage and spices, locally a delicacy.

Sopa de res is a soup made from beef shank, beef bone with meat, carrots, plantain, corn, potatoes, zucchini, and many other ingredients.

Gallo en chicha is a soup made with rooster, corn, dulce de tapa, and sometimes other things.

Sopa de pescado is a soup made out of fish or seafood with corn flour, tomatoes, green peppers, cumin, achiote and other ingredients, commonly eaten for the Christian holiday of Good Friday.

Sopa de pollo is a chicken stew with tomatoes, green peppers, guisquil, carrots, potatoes, consommé, and other ingredients.

Sopa de gallina india is a chicken broth with vegetables. Some people add lorocos and cream.

Sopa de frijoles (bean soup) is a red bean soup.

Sopa de chipilin (chipilin soup) is a chicken soup with chipilin leaves and vegetables.

== Salpicón de res ==
Salpicón or picadillo is a dish made with minced beef, mint and onions. Some people add rice.

== Panes rellenos ==
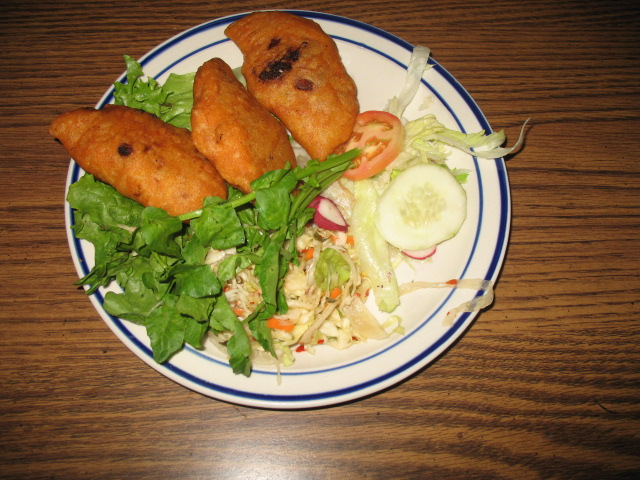
Salvadoran pastelitos

Panes rellenos (stuffed bread) are warm sandwiches, often made with chicken, carne asada, or turkey. The chicken or turkey is marinated and then roasted with Pipil spices and hand-pulled. This sandwich is traditionally served with tomatoes, cucumbers, lettuce, and watercress.

== Desserts ==
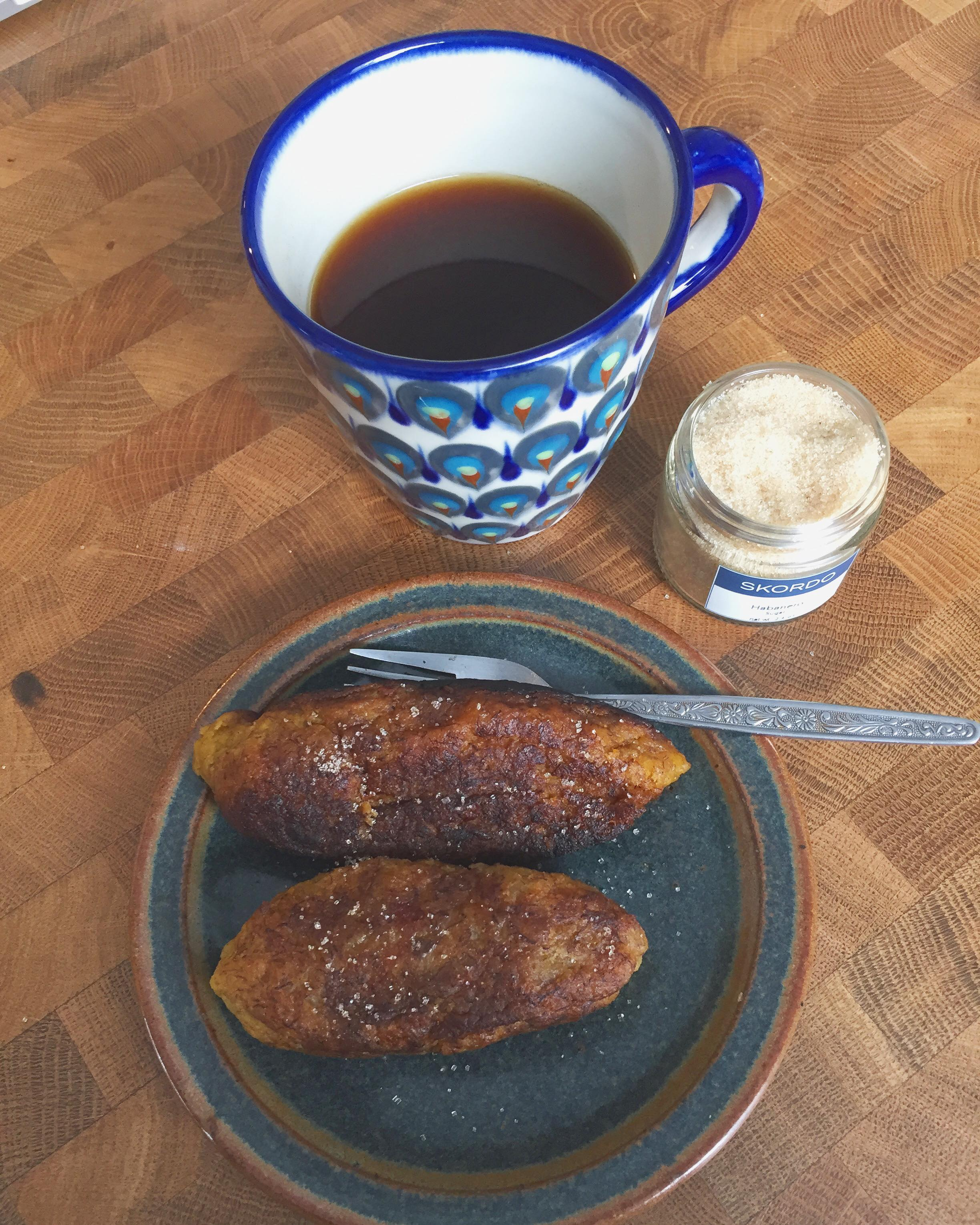
Salvadoran empanadas de platano with coffee

A variety of pan dulces, or pastries, are popular.

Salvadoran desserts include:

- Semita de piña, pineapple preserves sandwiched between layers of pastry (not to be confused with the Mexican cemita)
- Quesadilla salvadoreña, a pound cake made with rice flour and queso duro blando (a strong and salty cheese) and topped with sesame seeds (unrelated to the Mexican quesadilla);
- Torta de yema, a pound cake made with wheat flour and flavoured with cinnamon
- Marquesote, a sponge cake flavoured with cinnamon and sometimes anise, served in long rectangular slices
- Salpores, cookies made from rice flour and flavoured with cinnamon, with a short (rich and crumbly) texture
- Poleada or manjar de leche, a white pudding made from milk, cornstarch and sugar, flavoured with vanilla
- Arroz con leche, rice pudding flavoured with anise seed, star anise, or raisins
- Empanadas de platano, torpedo-shaped dumplings of dough made from very ripe plantains, filled with vanilla custard, fried, then rolled in sugar

The dulce de leche of El Salvador has a soft, crumbly texture, with an almost crystallized form.

Fruits are widely consumed, the most popular being mangoes, coconuts, papayas, and bananas. Sometimes fruit with ice cream and cinnamon sprinkled on top is served.

== Beverages ==
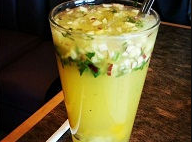
Ensalada is a popular fruit drink in El Salvador.

Teenagers usually drink cocas (soft drinks) like Coca-Cola, while young and old alike drink coffee, El Salvador's top export. Viejitas, "little old ladies", are biscuits dipped in morning coffee.

A popular soda that originated in El Salvador is Kolashanpan, which is a soda with sugar cane flavor. Minutas, shaved ice flavored with fruit-flavored syrup, and horchata, a beverage made from rice milk and a mix of spices such as cinnamon, peanut beverage, ajonjolí (sesame seeds) and morro, are popular throughout the country and enjoyed on a hot day.

Licuados are like minutas with added fresh fruit and (sometimes) milk. Frescos (short for refrescos) refer to lemonades or other sweetened fruit drinks. Other drinks include arrayán, chuco and chilate. Another popular beverage is ensalada ("salad"), made of pineapple juice with finely chopped fruits, usually apples, marañón, mamey, and watercress.

Tamarindo juice is consumed in all of El Salvador. Coconuts are sold at roadside estansas throughout the country. Typically, they are chopped with machetes and a straw is inserted so that the coconut water can be consumed. Adults drink coconut milk, mixed with vodka, as an aperitif. Vinagre de piña is a drink of trimmed pineapples mixed with panela and water and set aside to ferment for a few weeks or even months.

=== Alcoholic beverages ===
The most common alcoholic beverage in El Salvador is beer (cerveza). Popular beers are made by Industrias La Constancia. Established in 2004, with their first bottling in 2015, Ron Cihuatán is El Salvador's only rum distiller.

The national liquor of El Salvador is Tic Tack, a sugar cane distillate. Tick Tack has similar flavors to cachaça.

== Seafood ==
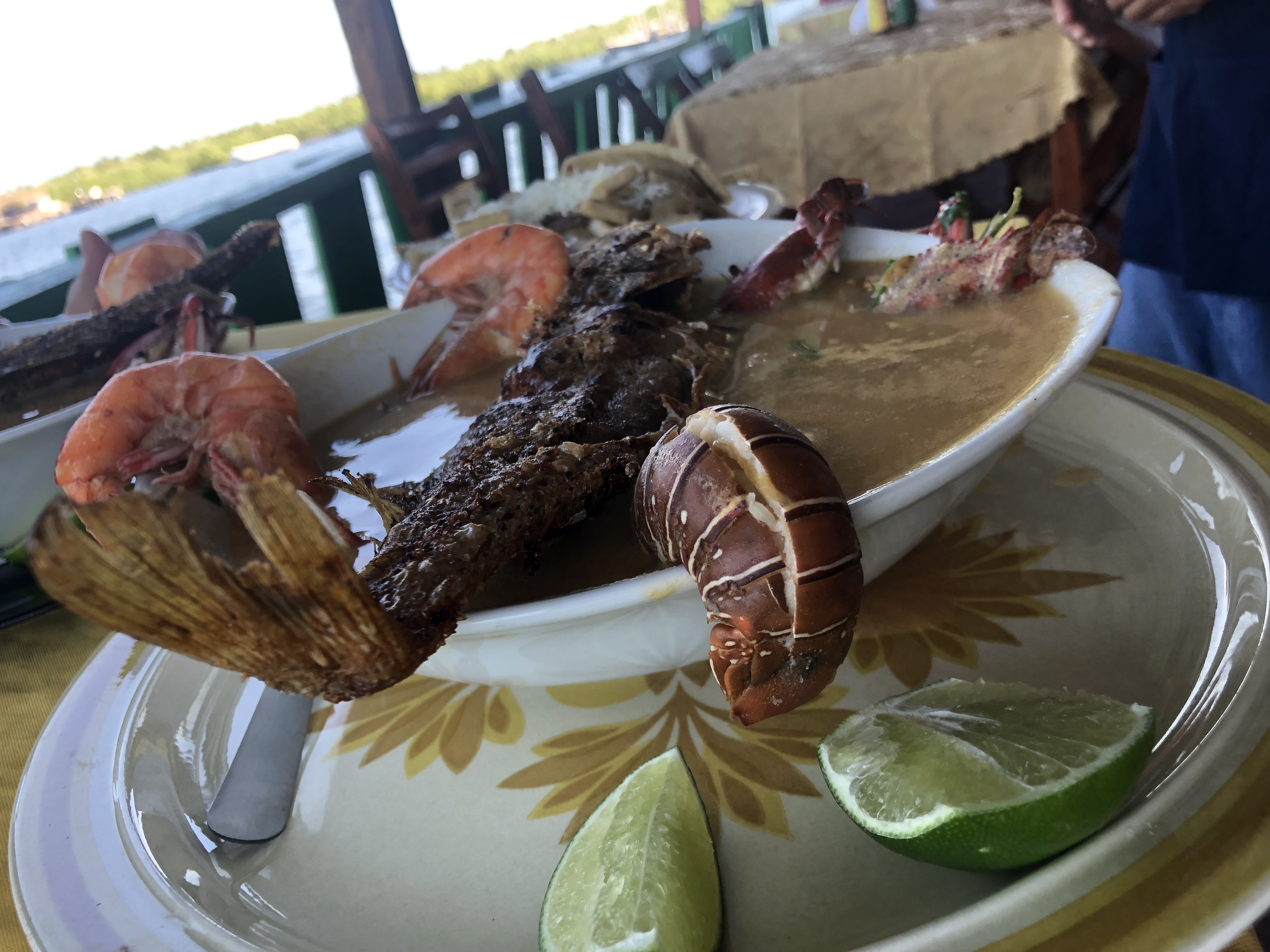
Salvadoran lobster soup

Salvadorans eat a large variety of seafood. Salvadoran ceviches are made with clams, oysters, fish, shrimp, snails, octopus, squid, and a type of black clam called conchas by locals. Cocktails and ceviches are prepared with a type of tomato and chopped onion sauce or Worcestershire sauce, locally called "Salsa Inglesa" or Salsa Perring after the Lea & Perrins brand, and both are sprinkled with lemon juice.

Salvadorans also eat fried crabs and lobsters or fried fish with garlic and lemon. Shrimps are also eaten roasted, al ajillo, or in butter. There is also a type of seafood soup called mariscada, which contains fish, clams, octopus, squid, shrimp, and crab.

== See also ==
- Alguashte
- Chicha
- Chilate
- Chuco
- Güisquil
- Popoca, Salvadoran restaurant
