= Elizabeth Pearson =

Elizabeth Pearson may refer to:

- Elizabeth Pearson, married name Elizabeth Goodfellow
- Elizabeth Pearson (badminton) in 1939 All England Badminton Championships

== See also ==
- Betty Pearson (disambiguation)
