= Quesadilla Salvadoreña =

Salvadoran and pound cake made with shredded cheese

Quesadilla salvadoreña
- Type: Salvadoran cuisine, pound cake
- Place of origin: El Salvador
- Region or state: National
- Main ingredients: flour, sugar, cheese

Quesadilla salvadoreña, or Salvadoran quesadilla, is a pan dulce, similar to a pound cake, made with rice flour and queso duro blando and topped with sesame seeds, that is popular in El Salvador and eastern Guatemala. Queso duro blando can be substituted with Parmesan cheese. It is commonly served with coffee as part of breakfast or as a snack. It is traditionally baked on Sunday mornings.

By the 21st century the dish was increasingly found in US cities with large Salvadoran diaspora populations, such as San Antonio, New York, and Los Angeles. Salvadorans refer to the dish simply as a quesadilla; in Los Angeles; they may spell it quezadilla to distinguish it from Mexican customers from a Mexican quesadilla.
