= Sopa de pata =

Salvadoran soup

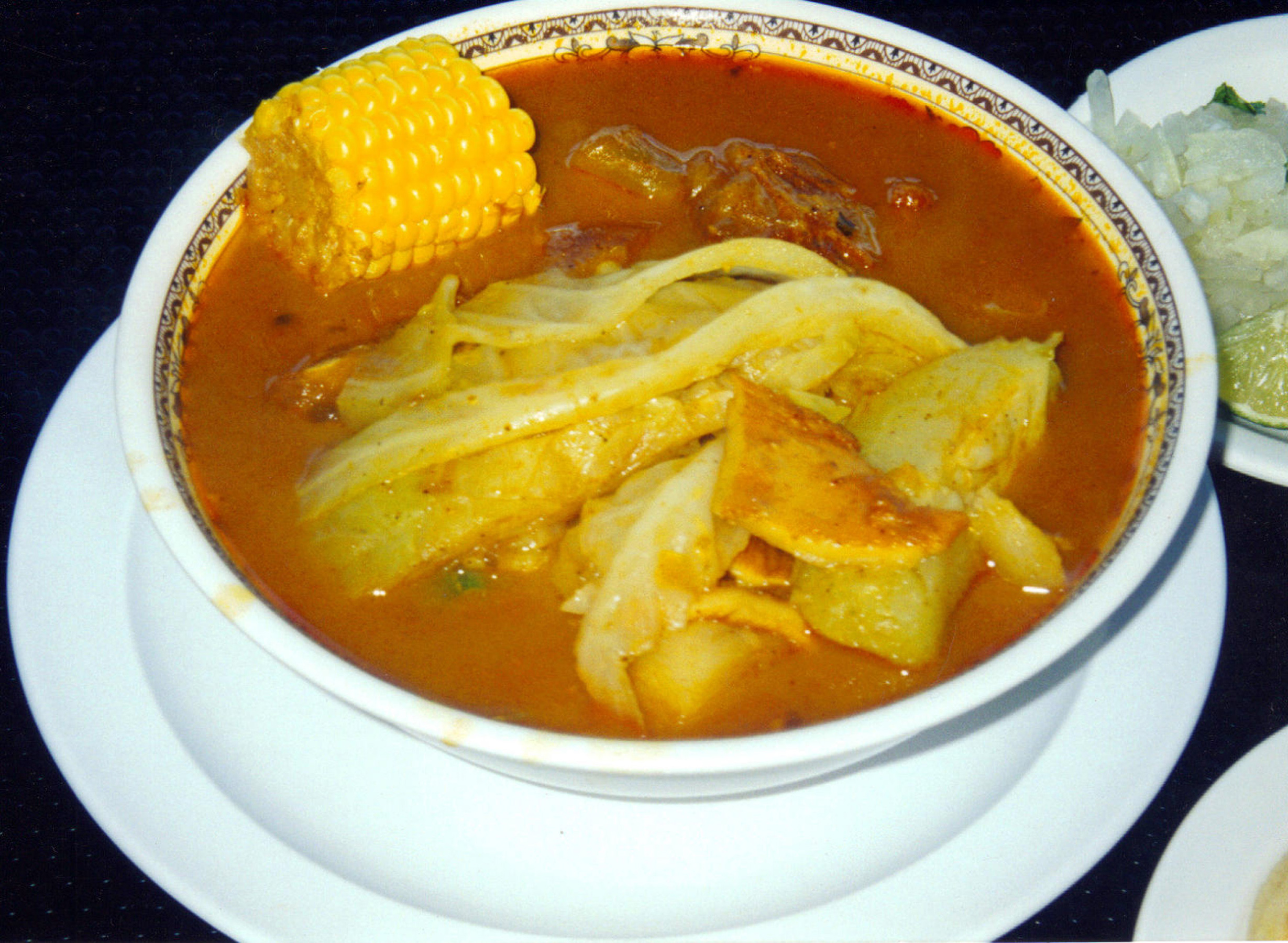
- Type: Soup
- Place of origin: El Salvador, Ecuador
- Main ingredients: Cow’s feet, tripe, yuca, chayotes, sweet corn, plantains, green beans

Sopa de pata is a hearty Salvadoran soup made from cow's feet, tripe, yuca (also called cassava or manioc), cabbage leaves, chayotes, sweet corn, plantains, and green beans. It may be seasoned with Mexican coriander leaves and flavored to taste with lemon or chile powder.

The inclusion of lemon in the dish serves to counter the richness of the broth. For the same purpose, chopped and pickled onions are sometimes added as a topping.

The preparation of the dish starts a day before it is served, as the trotters are cooked. In El Salvador, the dish has been prepared and sold out of the Tinetti market of San Salvador since the 1960s.
