= Betty Pearson =

Betty Pearson may refer to:

- Betty Pearson, fictional character in Fallout (American TV series)
- Betty Pearson, fictional character in Diagnosis: Murder season 5

== See also ==
- Elizabeth Pearson (disambiguation)
