= Gallo en chicha =

Central American chicken dish

Gallo en chicha is a traditional chicken dish in Salvadoran cuisine, also eaten elsewhere in Central America, such as in Guatemala. The dish is made with rooster, Salvadoran chicha and panela. It is somewhat similar to coq au vin, but like much of Salvadoran cuisine is a blend of European influences and the Salvadoran ingredients and cooking traditions.

While it is consumed in most parts of El Salvador, it is most common in the western and central parts of the country. The dish is consumed in both rural and urban areas.

Because cooking this dish is complicated and time-consuming, it is usually prepared for special occasions and celebrations, such as holidays or the birth of a child.
