= Cuisine of Mexico City =

Culinary traditions of Mexico City

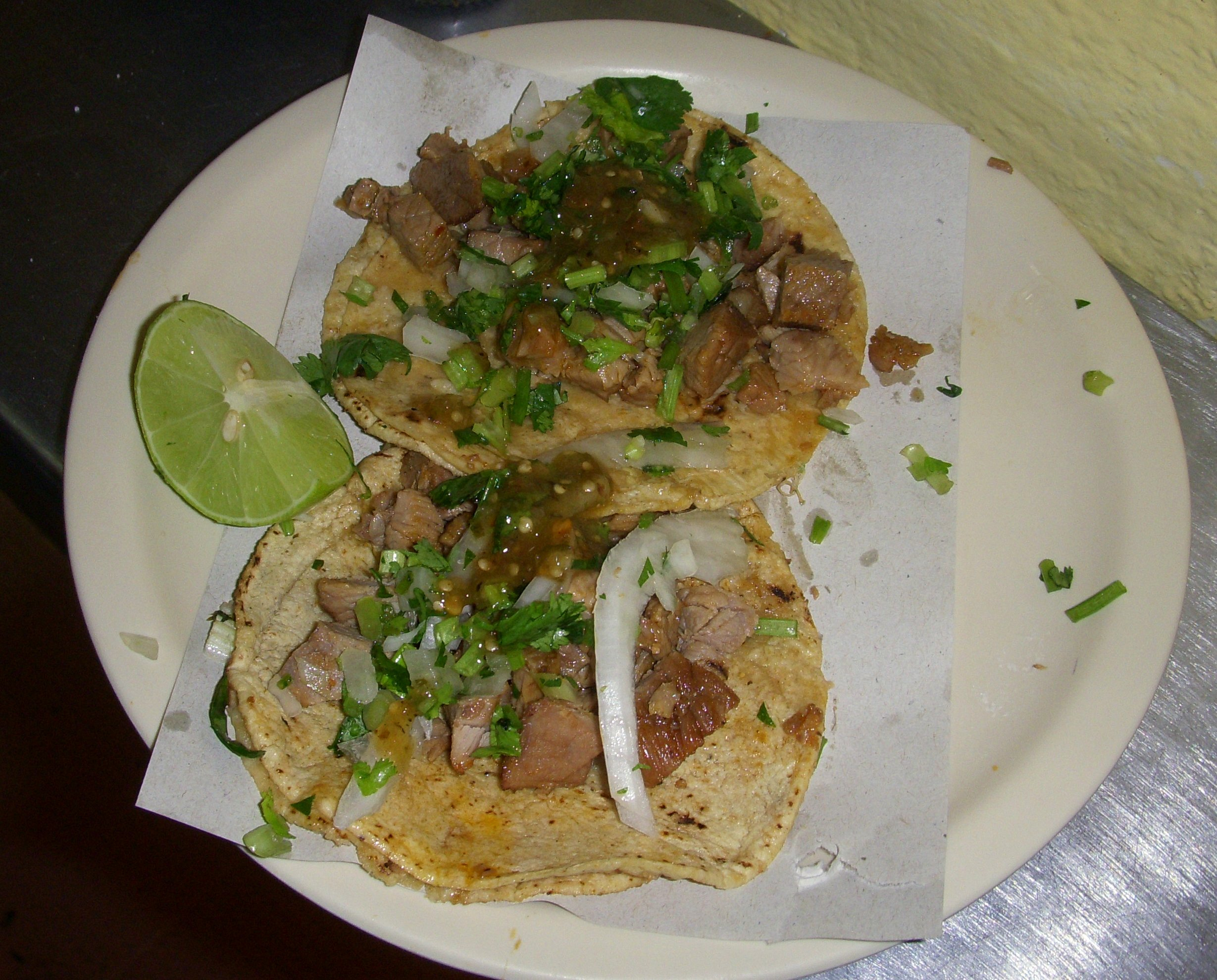
Cabeza tacos in Mexico City

The cuisine of Mexico City encompasses a variety of cuisines. Restaurants specialize in the regional cuisines of Mexico's 31 states, and the city also has several branches of internationally recognized restaurants.

== History ==
In 1325, the Aztecs settled in the region around Lake Texcoco in the highlands of Central Mexico. Here they lived off the rich food resources of the lake and developed sophisticated constructions of canals for irrigation, terracing, and 'sunken' gardens called chinampas to work the productive marsh lands around the lake.

By the late 16th century, sweetened chocolate drinks spiced with nutmeg and cinnamon were very popular in Mexico City. As the colonial era drew to a close refined multi-court meals had become standard for the Mexico City aristocracy, beginning with a soup like albondigas, usually followed by a fried Spanish rice garnished with slices of hard boiled egg. The main dishes were numerous and consisted of stewed or roasted meats which could be mutton stew with chili, roast chicken stuffed with onion, or less commonly beef dishes. Meat courses were followed by frijoles refritos, and for dessert custard, sweet pastry or fresh fruits.

19th century cookbooks rarely included recipes for corn-based dishes like atole, tamales, quesadillas or enchiladas, and those that did called them almuerzos ligeros (light brunches). The concept of a national cuisine was, in Mexico City, divided between the continental European style cuisine associated with Mexican elites and the typical commoner's fare.

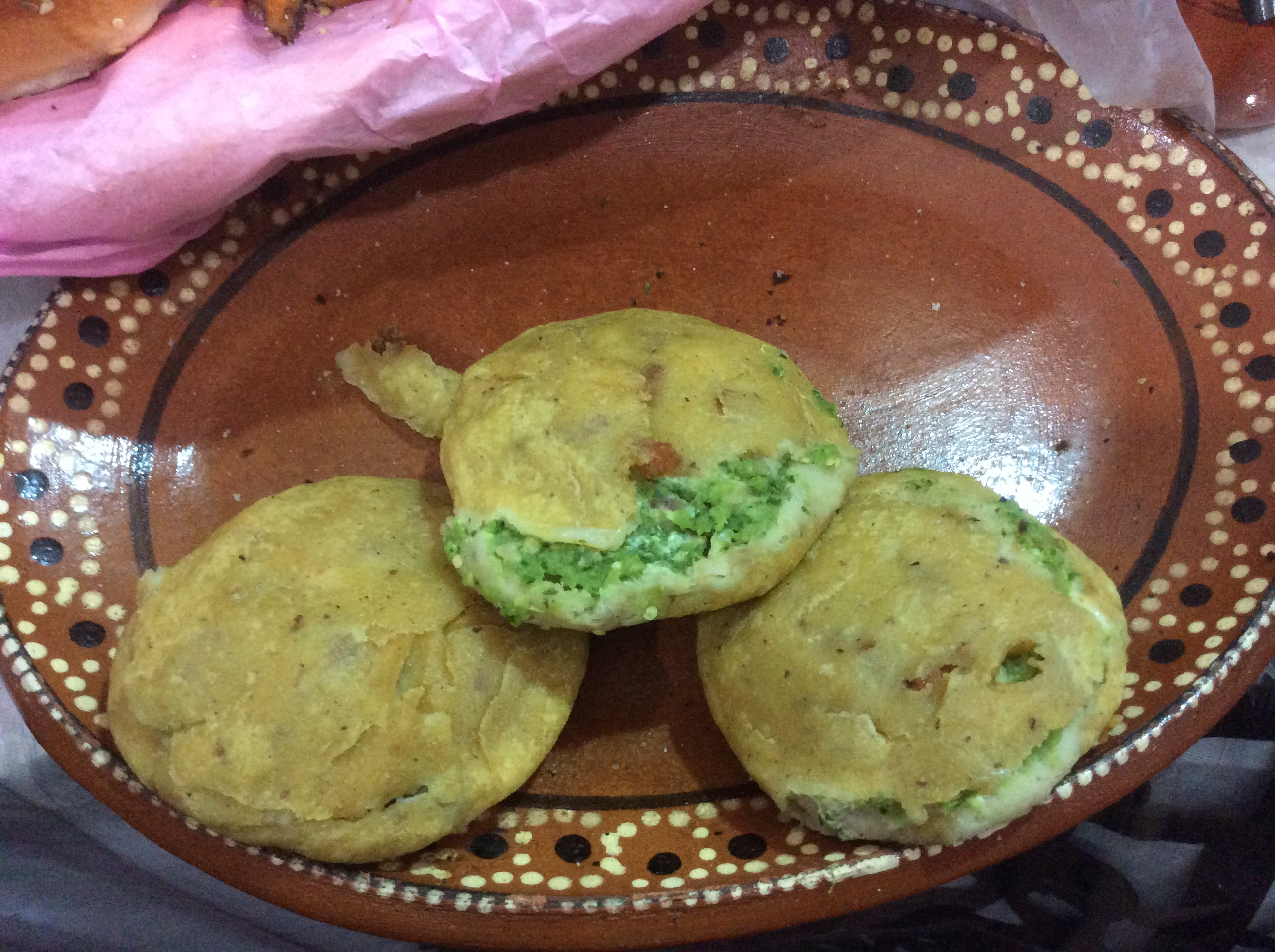
Gorditas prepared for Day of the Dead celebrations in Coyoacan

Once considered plebeian fare, by the 19th century, tacos had become a standard of Mexico City's cuisine. Workers moving to Mexico City from the rural countryside brought their culinary traditions with them. As unlicensed vendors began selling corn-based dishes on the street, authorities struggled to tax local taquerias, imposing licensing requirements and penalties, they recorded some details of the types of foods being served by these establishments. The most frequent reference was for tacos de barbacoa. Also mentioned are enchiladas, tacos de minero and gorditas, along with oyster shops and fried fish stands. There is evidence of some regional specialties being made available for the recent migrants; at least two shops were known to serve pozole, a type of stew similar to hominy that is a staple of Guadalajara, Jalisco.

In the 1940s, the first meal of the day, called desayuno, would have been a light meal of a hot drink like coffee or hot chocolate, atole (corn porridge) and sweet bread or pastry, usually eaten around dawn. The second meal, almuerzo, eaten a few hours later was more substantial and included chilaquiles, eggs or meat. The hearty multi-course mid-day meal (comida) would have included a soup, rice, meat, vegetables and dessert. An early evening meal could include bread and coffee, and on special occasions a more substantial dinner might be served. Mole sauces were prepared for special feastdays.

The commercial food industry expanded during World War II after the construction of the Pan-American Highway. Pre-sliced sandwich bread produced by commercial bakeries became a common household item, and beer began to overtake pulque as the most common beverage. Chicken became more widely available in the post-War era and processed meats like hams, sausages, and other cold cuts became available, aided by the arrival of European immigrants experienced in industrialized meat processing. Local butcher shops were stocked with cecina, chicharron and chorizo. Before this expansion of production and distribution, meat production had mostly taken place within the household.

== Specialties ==
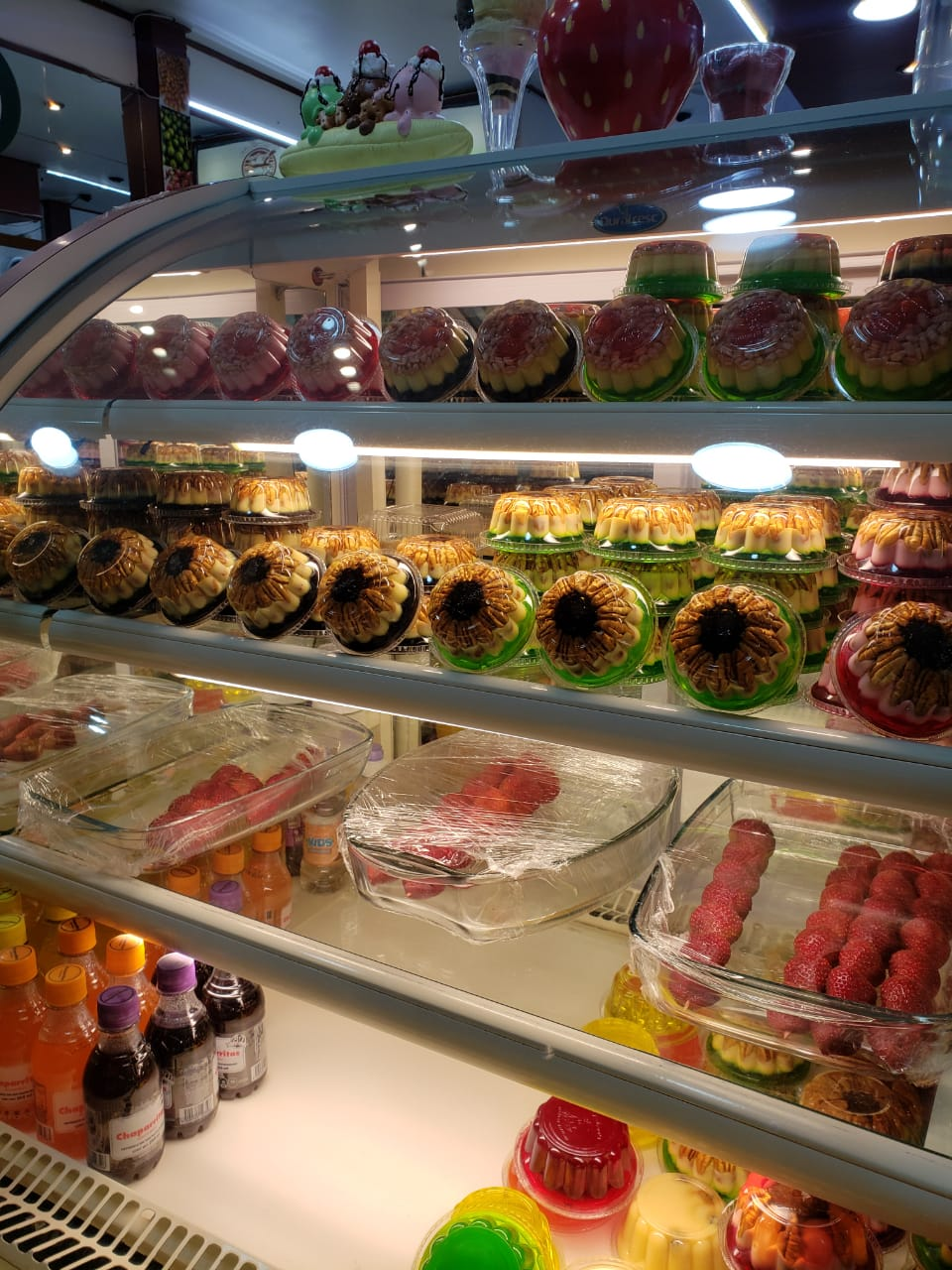
Mexican gelatin desserts at a local shop

Barbacoa de borrego (a slow-cooked lamb dish) is one of the most popular traditional dishes. It is more commonly prepared in the suburban outskirts in the Mexico City environs, such as Texcoco, where there is a centuries-old barbacoa tradition. The technique of wrapping the lamb in maguey cactus leaves and cooking it overnight in an earthen oven is borrowed from traditional Maya cuisine. Families from Mexico City often travel, usually on Sundays, to eat the dish where it is made. It is common for loyal clientele to patronize the same establishments as their parents or grandparents.

== Markets ==
There were few roads in and out of Mexico City in the 1940s; the major food markets, La Merced and Mercado Jamaica were mostly supplied by canal. There were few restaurants and little local food production aside from a few staple goods like cooking oil, flour and cookies. Most foods were prepared at home using corn, squash, beans, chiles and other locally grown crops available from the markets, usually accompanied by pork or beef.

Mexico City is known for having some of the freshest fish and seafood in Mexico's interior. La Nueva Viga Market is the second largest seafood market in the world after the Toyosu Market in Tokyo, Japan.

== Restaurants ==
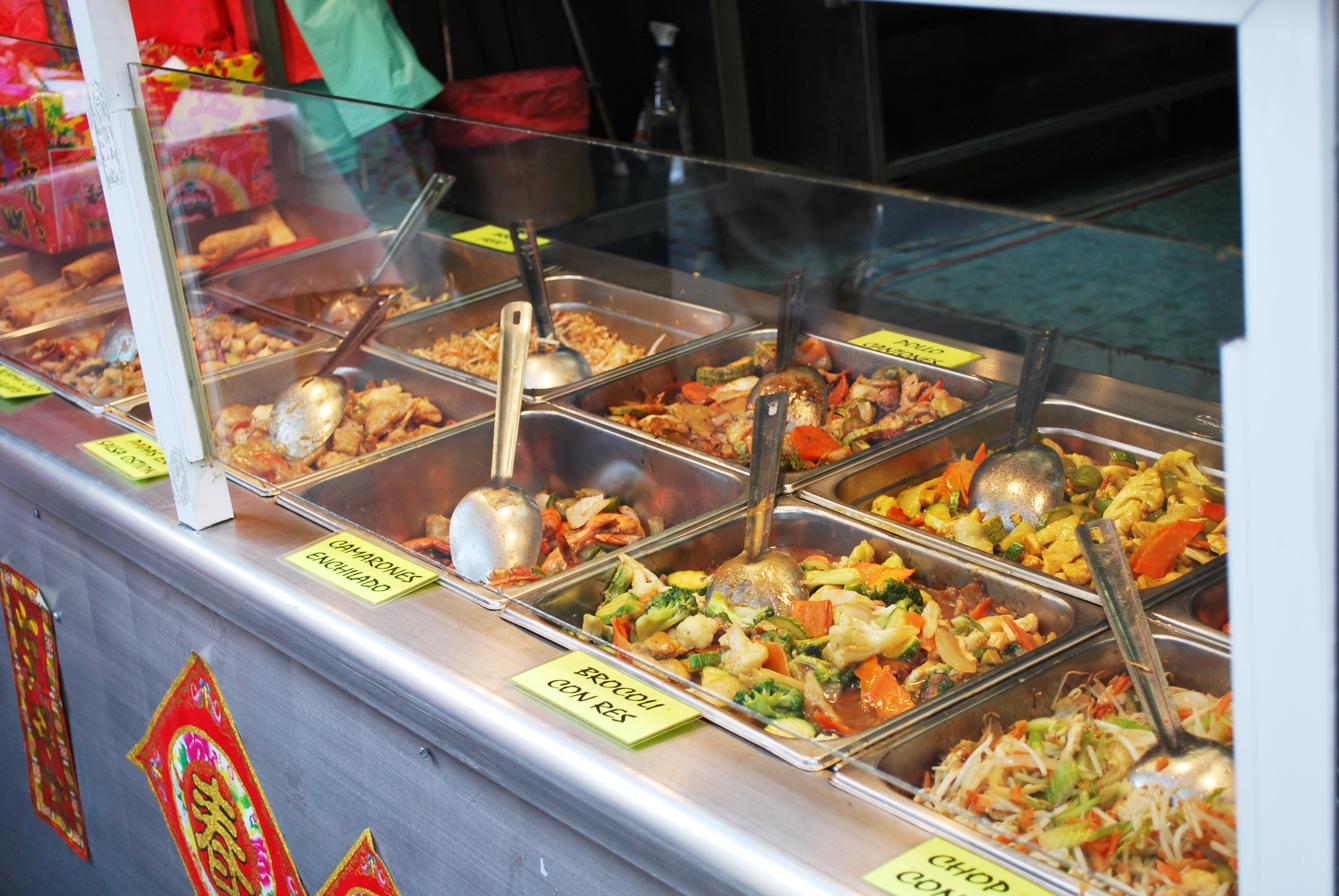
Chinese food at a restaurant in Mexico City's Barrio Chino

Some of the dishes found in Mexico City's restaurants have pre-Conquest roots: lobster in red chile sauce, cactus fruit tortillas and tamales with greens in crab sauce, are based on historic dishes attested to in the 16th-century Florentine Codex.

In the 1850s, fine dining establishments with views of Chapultepec Castle began catering to wealthy clientele. In 1891, at the behest of Ignacio de la Torre y Mier, Parisian chef Sylvain Daumont opened a restaurant in the city. Some menus have survived offering glimpses of the European-inspired cuisine served at the feasts, which featured no Mexican dishes. At Mexican president Porfirio Diaz's birthday celebration the wives of banquet guests watched from the balcony, as only men were seated for the meal.
