= Quesadilla =

Mexican dish of tortillas with melted cheese

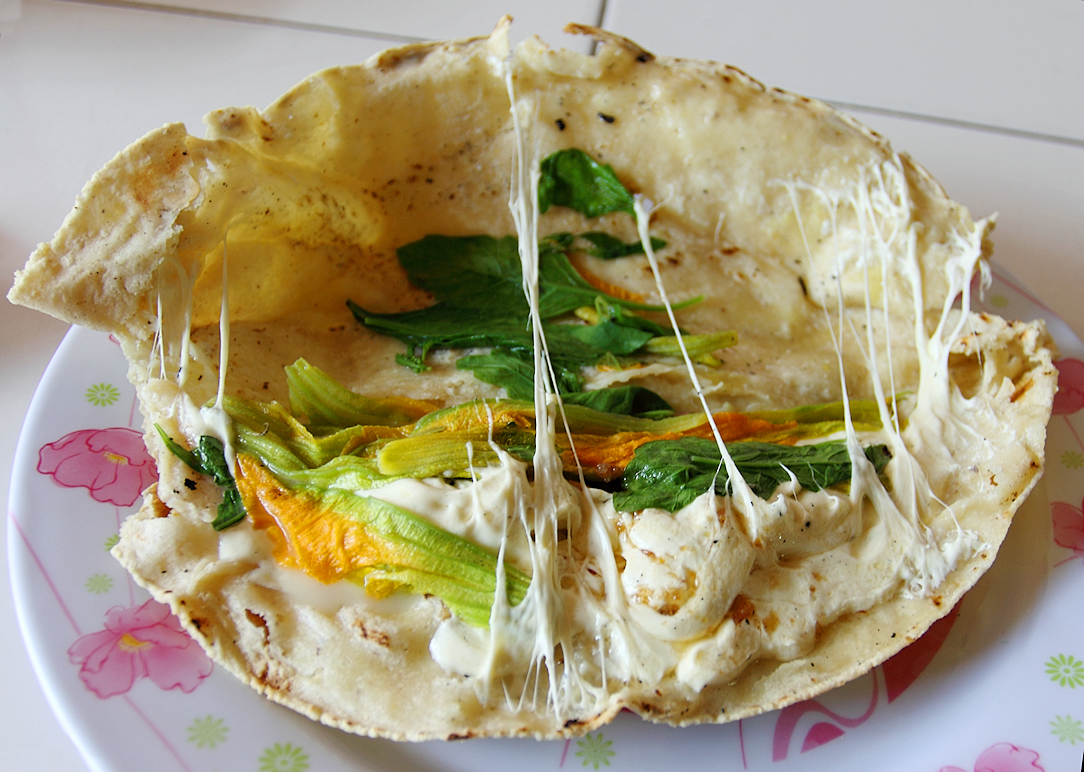
- Squash Blossom and quesillo quesadilla
- Type: Mexican cuisine
- Place of origin: Mexico
- Region or state: National
- Main ingredients: Tortillas, cheese; meat, salsa, onion

How to make a cheese quesadilla

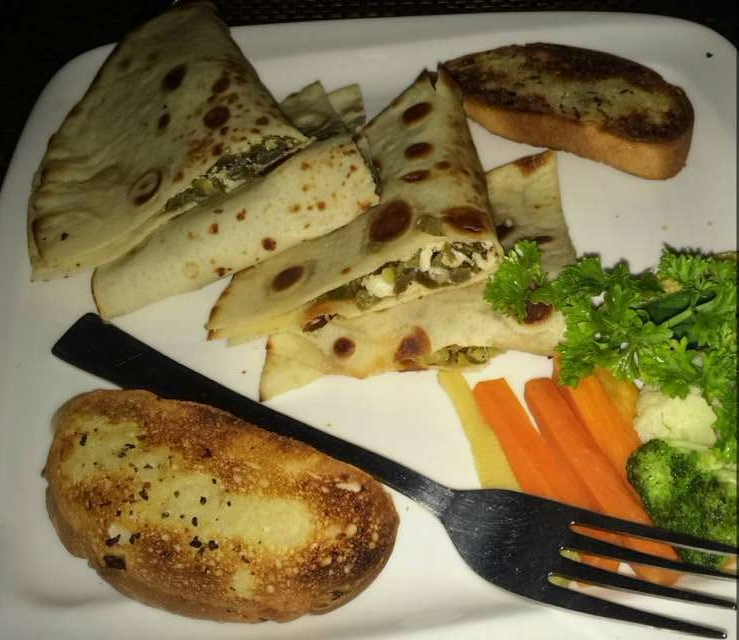
Quesadillas cut in half, showing contents

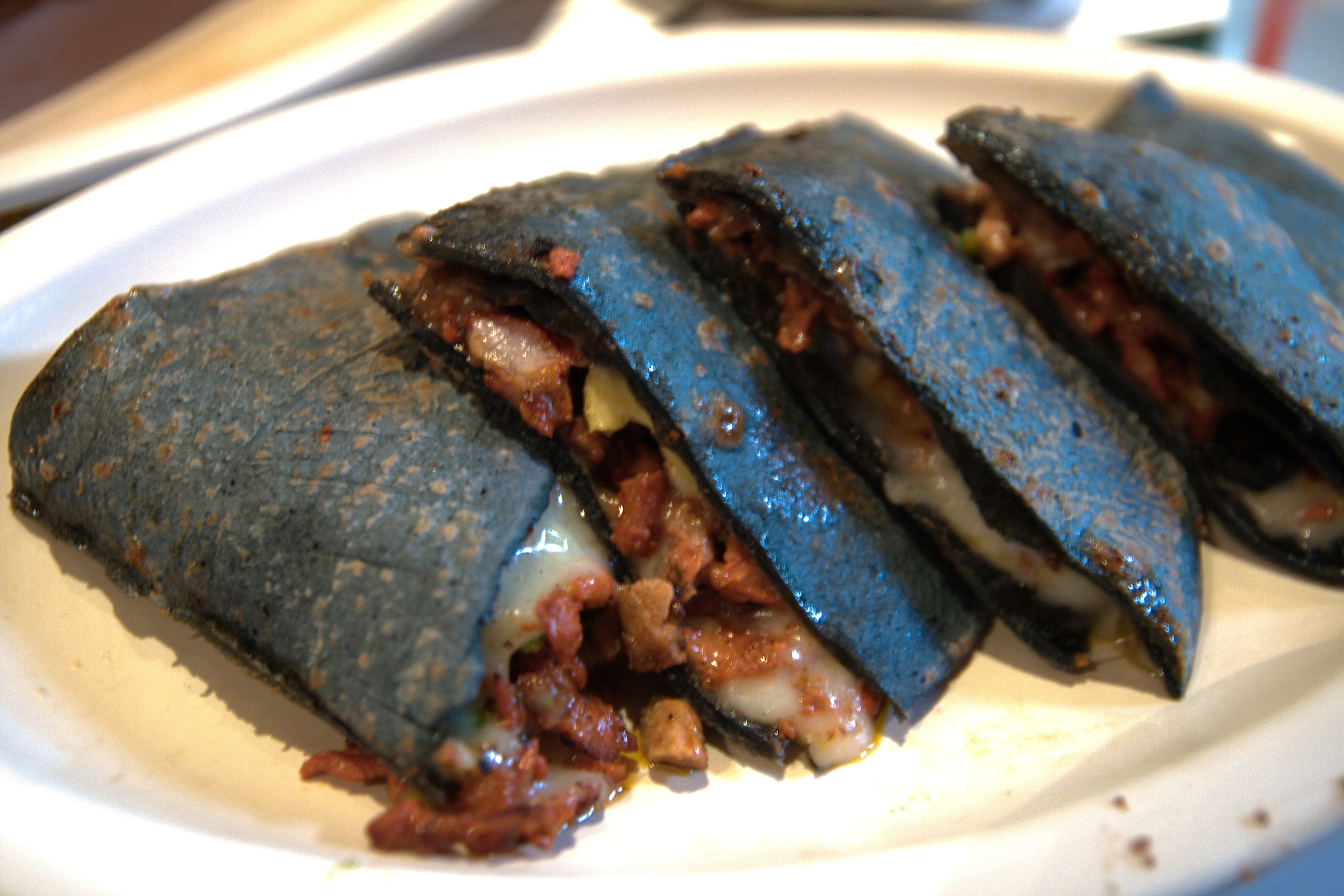
Blue corn quesadillas

A quesadilla (/ˌkeɪsəˈdiːjə/; Spanish: [kesaˈðiʝa]; Spanish diminutive of quesada) is a Mexican dish made from a tortilla folded in half or two tortillas that are filled with cheese (queso), and sometimes meats, spices, and other fillings, and then cooked on a griddle or stove. Quesadillas are frequently sold at Mexican restaurants all over the world.

== Types ==
=== Original Mexican quesadilla ===
The quesadilla has its origins in colonial Mexico, but has changed and evolved over the years.

In the central and southern regions of Mexico, a quesadilla is formed by warming a tortilla in a comal, adding fillings (which typically include cheese), folding it in half, and heating it through until the cheese has completely melted. Fillings typically include Oaxaca cheese (a stringy Mexican cheese made by the pasta filata (stretched-curd) method), and may include cooked meats such as tinga made of chicken or beef, pork, or chicharron, cooked vegetables or mixes such as potatoes combined with chorizo, and items such as squash blossoms and huitlacoche.

Other popular fillings and toppings include green or red salsa, avocado or guacamole, chopped onion, tomato, chiles, and cilantro.

Quesadillas fritas are made by frying a folded filled quesadilla until golden and crispy. These may be made with tortillas, or by frying rings of masa in oil.

Other variations include using wheat flour tortillas, especially in Northern Mexico, mainly filled with Chihuahua cheese or queso menonita, a local cheese made by the Mennonite community.

In the cuisine of Mexico City, quesadillas are not assumed to come with cheese unless specifically requested. This is in contrast to the rest of Mexico, where quesadillas are considered to include cheese by definition (quesadilla literally meaning "little cheesy thing" in Spanish). This cultural trend cannot be traced back to a single origin.

In the cuisine of Oaxaca, large corn tortillas cooked on a dry comal and filled with cheese, which would be called quesadillas in other regions of Mexico, are known as empanadas. Oaxacan cheese empanadas are filled with Oaxaca cheese, and often asiento as well as epazote and other fillings such as mushrooms or corn smut. Other common fillings for Oaxacan empanadas include mole amarillo and mole verde.

The combination of cheese and ham sandwiched between two flour tortillas, cooked and wedged – commonly known as a sincronizada (Spanish for "synchronized") in Mexico – is not regarded as a quesadilla. Tourists are frequently confused because the dish is typically called a quesadilla in most Mexican restaurants outside of Mexico.

=== In the United States ===
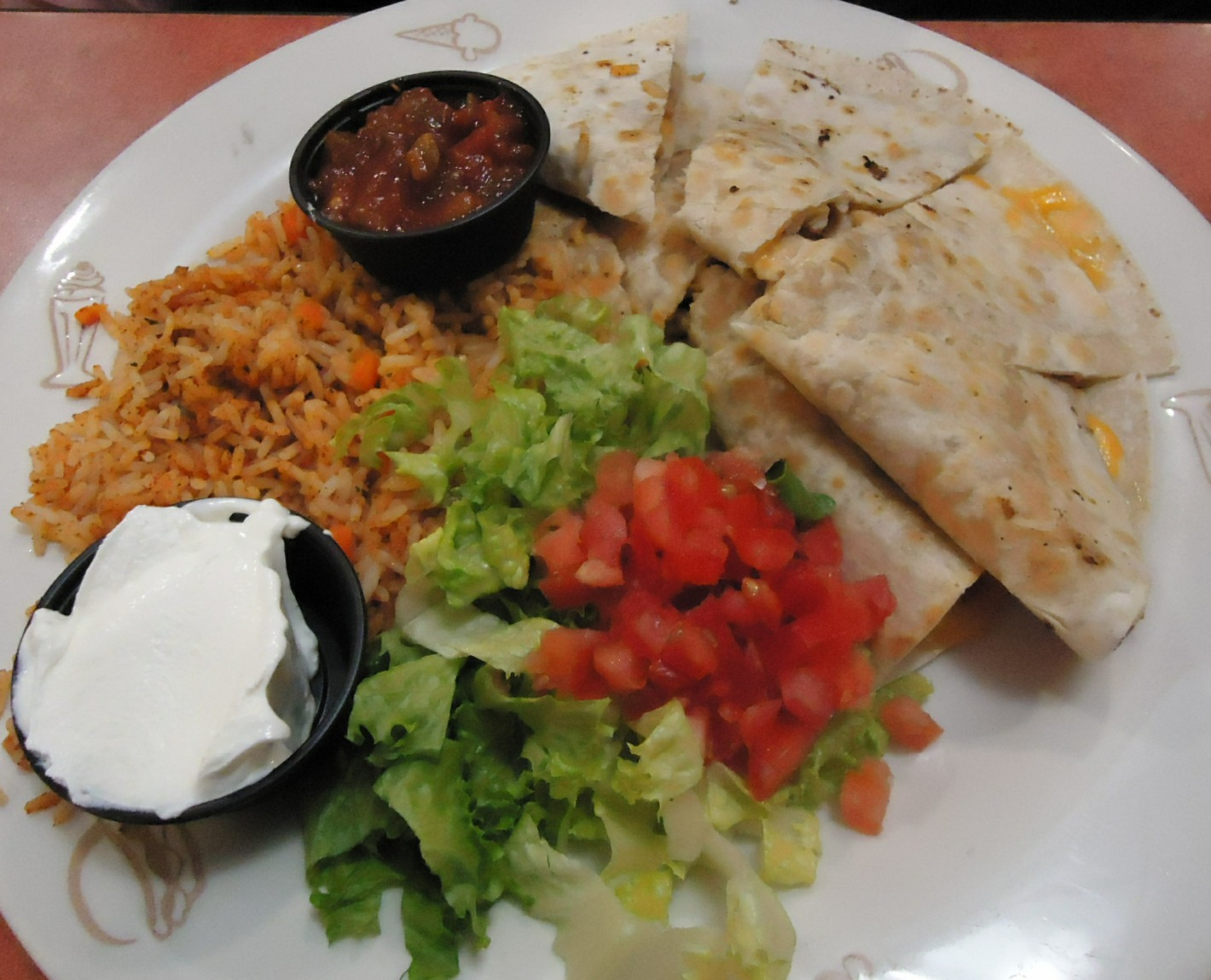
Quesadillas served at a Friendly's restaurant in New Jersey

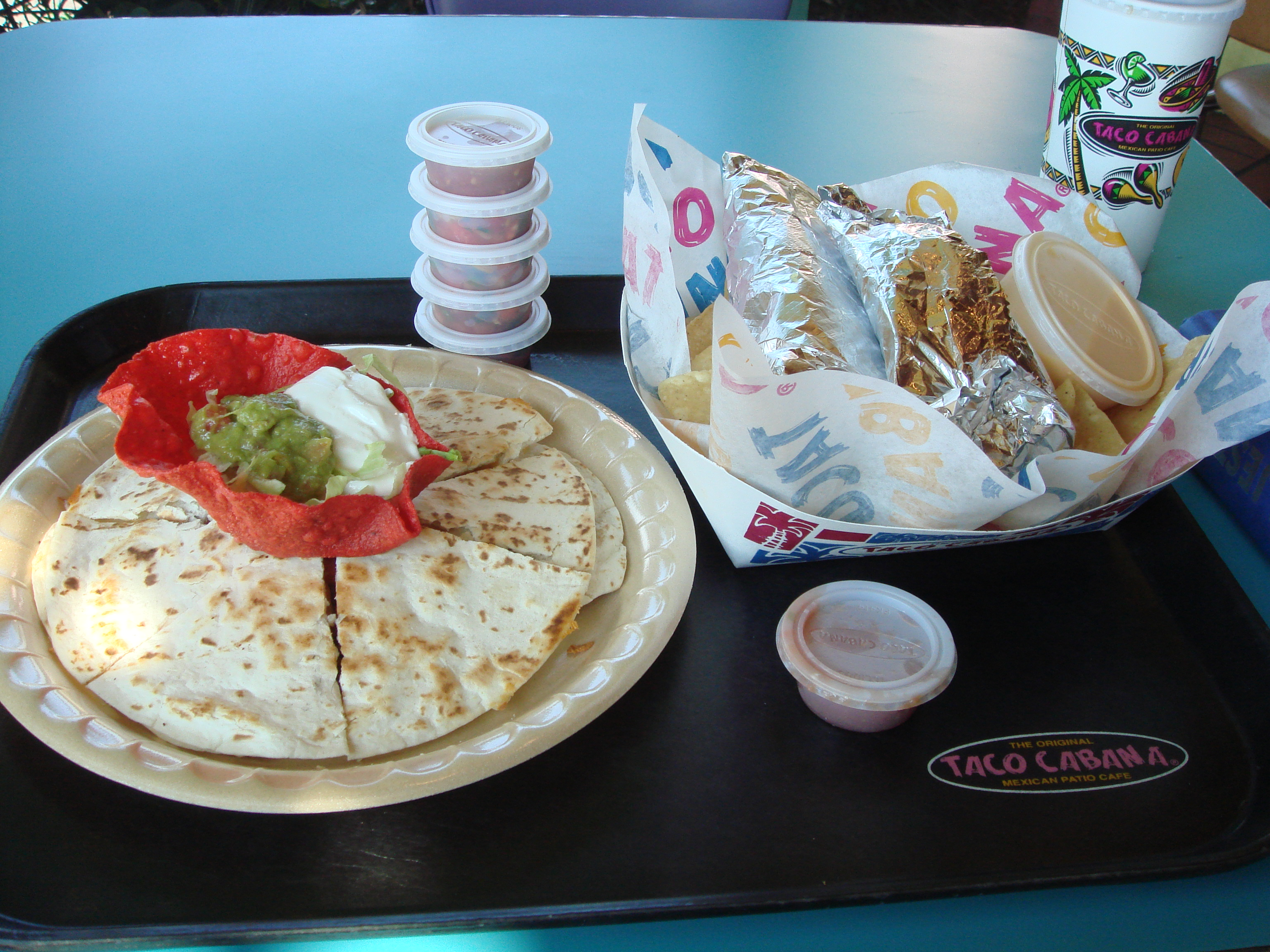
A quesadilla served with guacamole and sour cream

The quesadilla is a regional favorite in the Southwestern U.S., where it is similar to a grilled cheese sandwich, with the inclusion of local ingredients. A flour tortilla is heated on a griddle, then flipped and sprinkled with a grated, usually high-moisture, melting cheese (queso quesadilla), such as Monterey Jack, Cheddar cheese, or Colby Jack. Once the cheese melts, other ingredients, such as shredded meat, peppers, onions, or guacamole may be added, and it is then folded and served.

Another preparation involves cheese and other ingredients sandwiched between two flour tortillas, with the whole package grilled on an oiled griddle and flipped so both sides are cooked and the cheese is melted. This version is often cut into wedges to be served. A home appliance (quesadilla maker) is sold to produce this kind of quesadilla, although it does not use oil and cooks both sides at once. This type is similar to the Mexican sincronizada, but in the United States, fajita beef or chicken or other ingredients instead of ham are often used. In Mexico, this type of quesadilla is called "gringa" (the name varies in some regions in Mexico, including a type of quesadilla called "chavindeca").

Regional variations to specific recipes exist throughout the Southwest.

=== Variations ===
Quesadillas have been adapted to many different styles. In the United States, many restaurants serve them as appetizers. Some variations use goat cheese, black beans, spinach, zucchini, or tofu. A variation that combines the ingredients and cooking technique of a quesadilla with pizza toppings has been described as a "pizzadilla".

Breakfast quesadillas include ingredients such as eggs, cheese and bacon, and are sometimes known as an "eggadilla".

Dessert quesadillas use ingredients such as chocolate, butterscotch, caramel and different fruits.

== See also ==
- Arepa, similar dish native to northern South America
- List of maize dishes
- List of Mexican dishes
- Quesadilla Salvadoreña, a pan dulce traditional to Salvadoran cuisine
