= Popoca =

Restaurant in Oakland, California, U.S.

- Interactive map of Popoca

Restaurant information
- Chef: Anthony Salguero
- Food type: Salvadoran
- Location: Oakland, California, United States

Popoca is a restaurant in Oakland, California, United States. Anthony Salguero is the chef. The restaurant serves Salvadoran cuisine.

== Reception ==
Popoca was named one of the twenty best new restaurants of 2024 by Bon Appétit.
