= Marquesote =

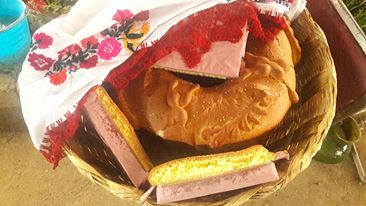
Bread basket with Marquesote in it

Marquesote is a traditional bread that forms part of the Mexican cuisine. It is popular in some specific states in Mexico, including Oaxaca, Chiapas, Veracruz, and Puebla. Within the towns of these states, the bread is often sold in local markets.

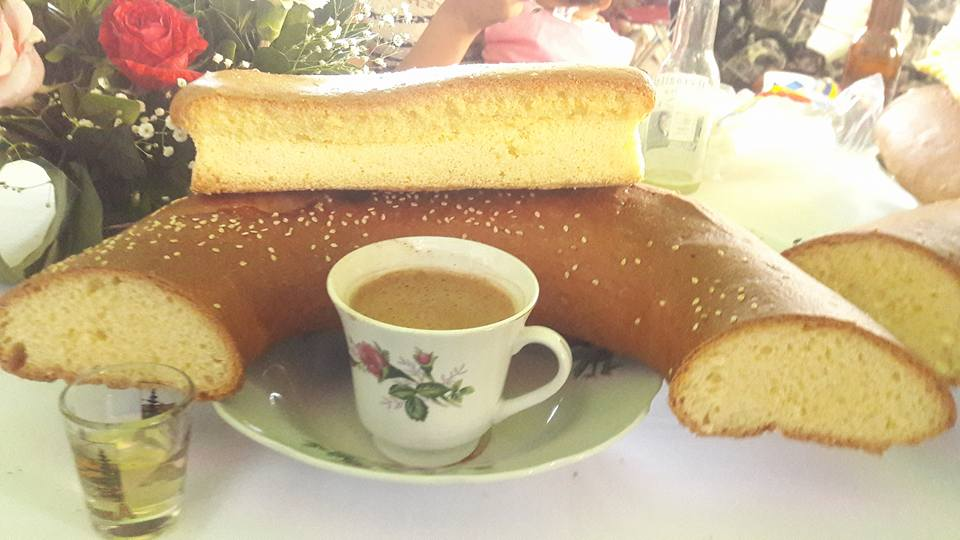
Bread with a cup of chocolate

Because Marquesote can be prepared without water, it is known for being dry and fragile. Furthermore, it does not have any particularly special ingredient, so the bread does not have a penetrating flavor. The typical accompaniment is a hot chocolate made with either a milk or water base to offset its subtle taste.

Like party bread or donkey bread, Marquesote is one of the main breads that represent the gastronomy of Mexican towns.

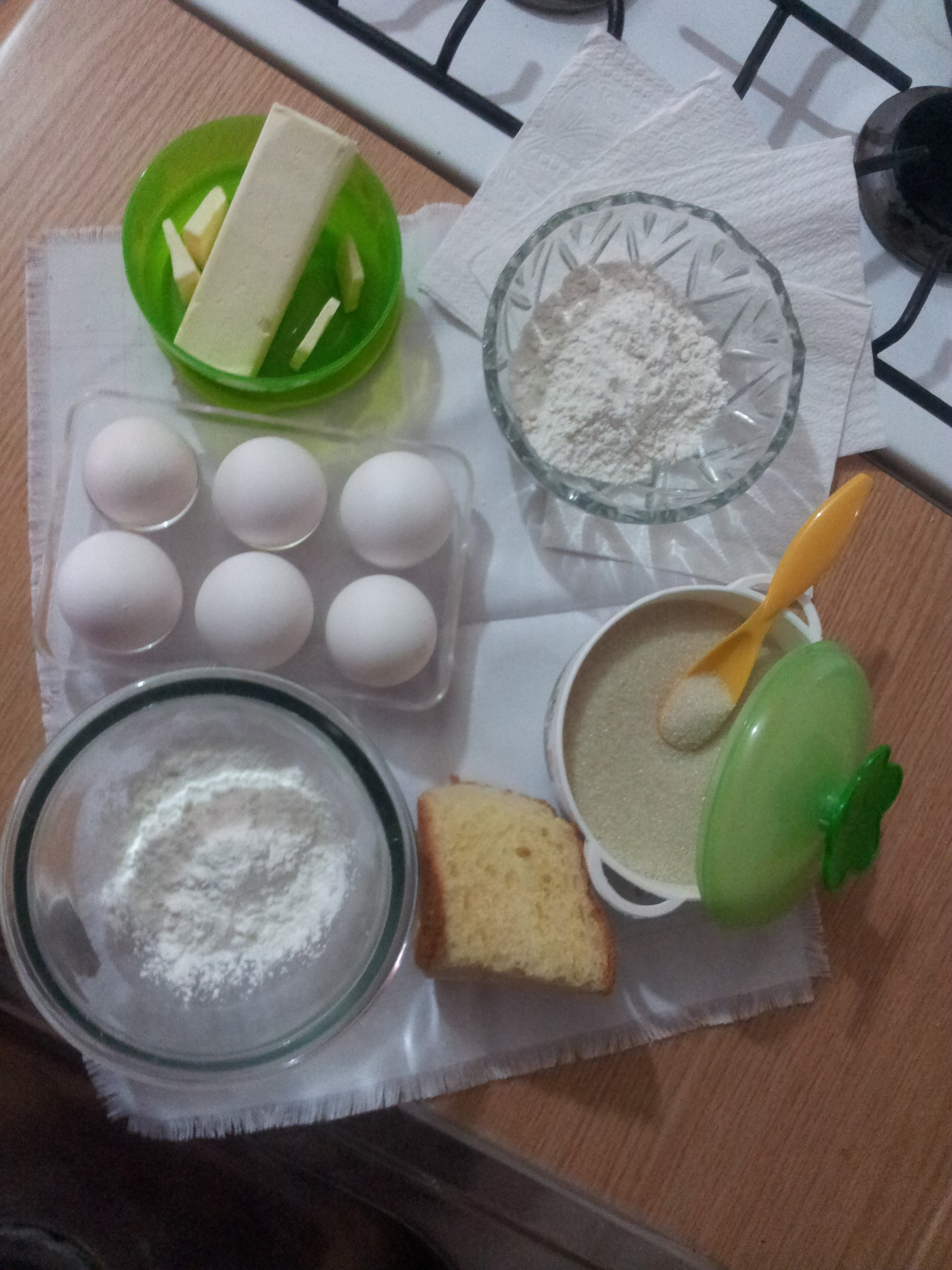
Ingredients for Marquesote

== Ingredients ==
- Eggs
- Sugar
- Butter
- Wheat starch
- Baking powder

== Preparation ==
In order to prepare Marquesote, it is important to make the dough mixture correctly. First, the egg whites are beaten, adding the yolks, sugar, baking powder, and cold melted butter afterwards. This is beaten until there is a homogenous mixture free of lumps. When the initial volume of the mixture doubles, it is poured into rectangular molds. These molds have been greased beforehand and are covered with brown paper.

Separately, the oven is preheated. Bakers from Mexican towns used to heat their ovens it with firewood, but the majority have substituted this resource for gas. The molds containing the dough mixture are placed in the oven after it reaches the proper temperature. The bread is then removed from the oven once a crispy top layer is obtained.

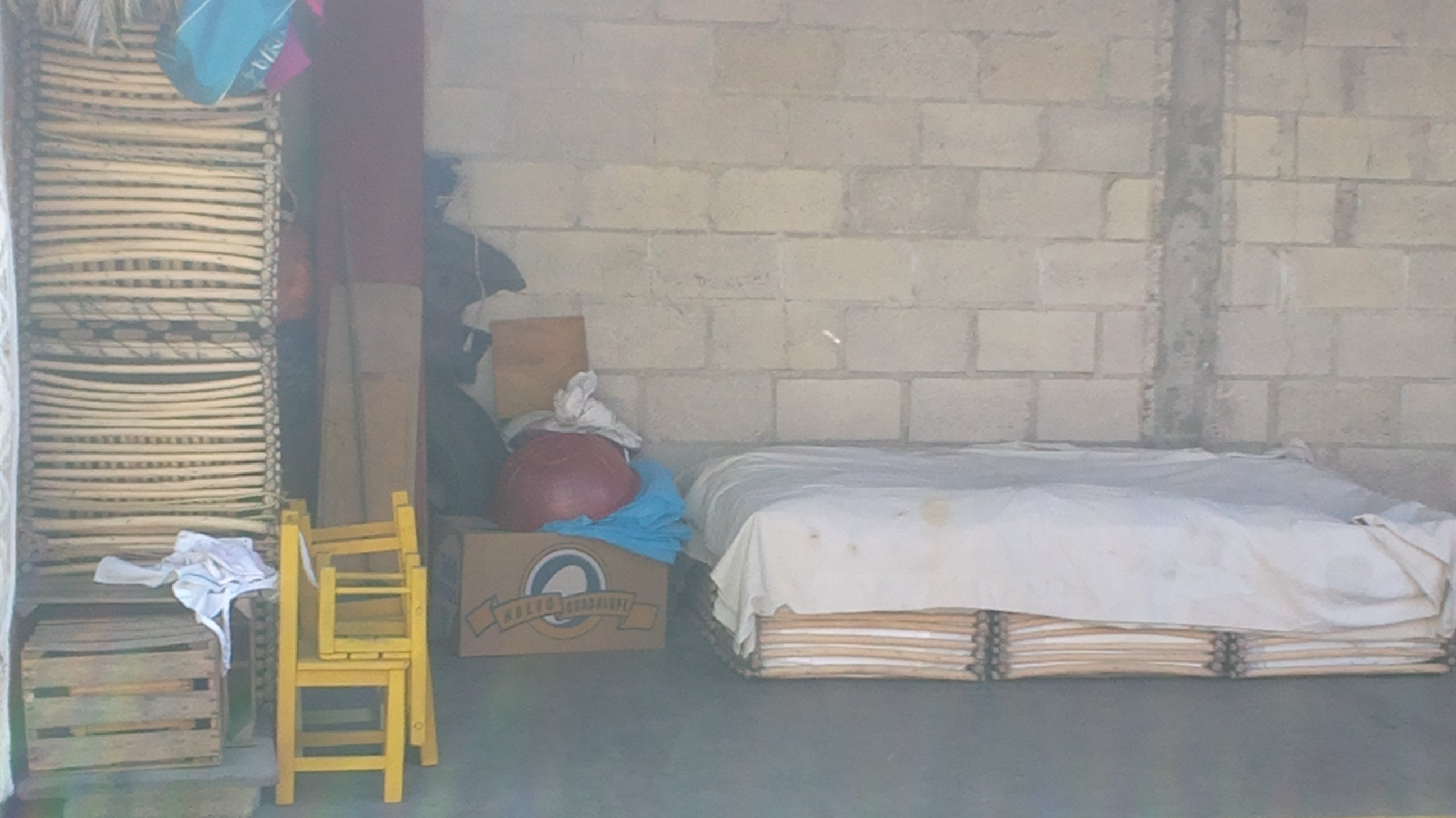
Crates with packaged bread

The pieces of bread are transported through crates, which are often layered with a white blanket and an oilcloth. This method prevents them from breaking, so it is used to transport the bread effectively.

== Variations ==
Specifically in Oaxaca, Mexico, Marquesote is prepared for a variety of celebrations. It can be prepared for family celebrations like birthdays and weddings, but it is also prepared for holidays like the Day of the Dead. In honor of the Day of the Dead, family members will make Marquesote and decorate the top by writing the name of their deceased loved one in icing. This icing is typically prepared in the same manner as a meringue. Additionally, red sugar is usually sprinkled over the Marquesote, and small chocolates are placed on top before the bread is added to Day of the Dead altars.

Marquesote is also an important component of the Salvadoran cuisine, and it is often prepared for various family celebrations. Its preparation is quite similar to the traditional Mexican form of Marquesote, but the dough is made by combining eggs, flour, sugar, cinnamon, and lemon. Furthermore, this variation of Marquesote is often accompanied by a refreshment, such as horchata, milk, or coffee.
