= Eliza Leslie =

American author of popular cookbooks

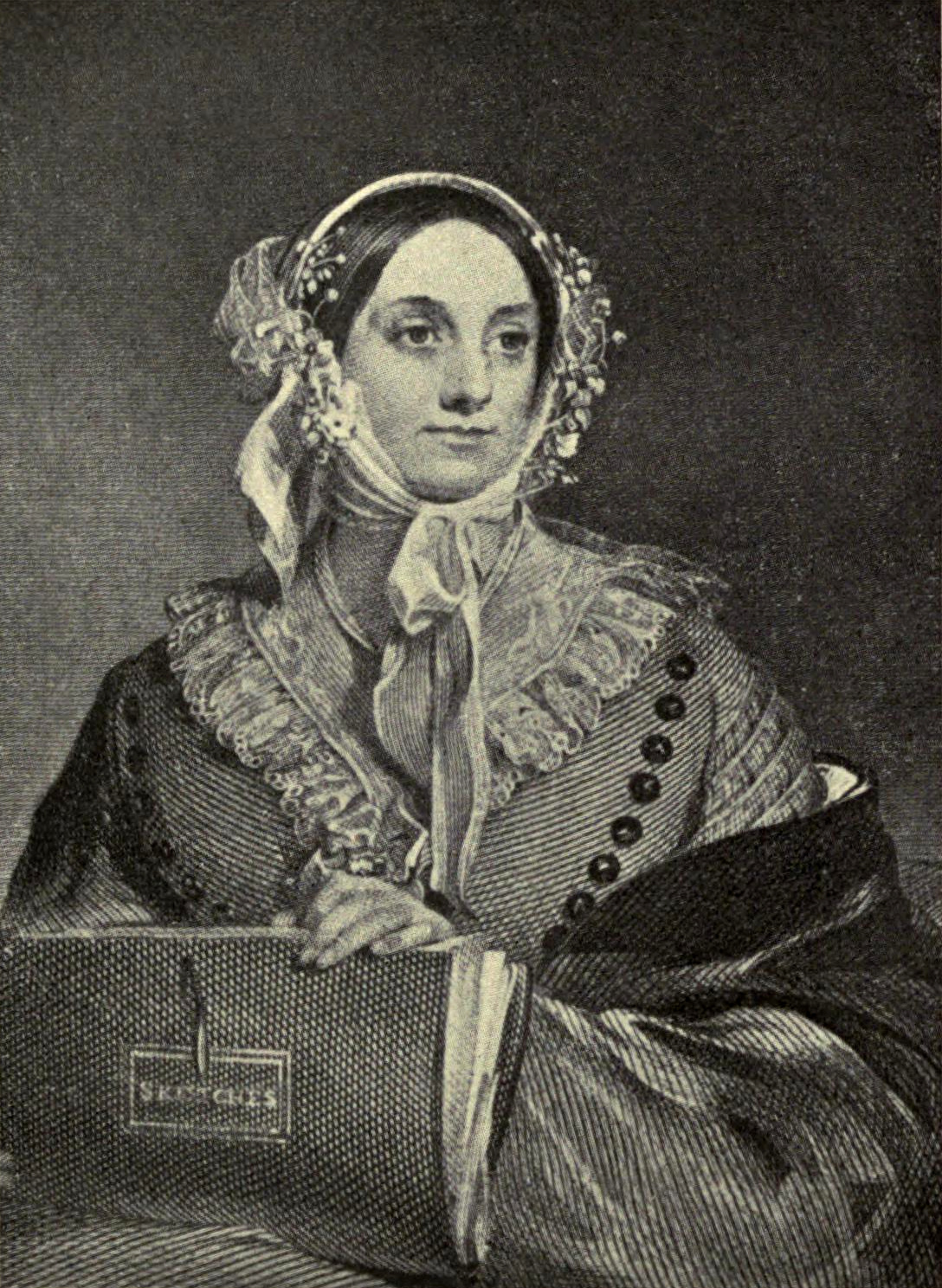
- Born: November 15, 1787; Philadelphia, Pennsylvania
- Died: January 1, 1858 (aged 70); Gloucester City, New Jersey
- Occupation: Author
- Parent(s): Lydia Baker and Robert Leslie

Eliza Leslie (1787–1858), frequently referred to as Miss Leslie, was an American writer of popular cookbooks during the nineteenth century. She also wrote household management books, etiquette books, novels, short stories and articles for magazines and newspapers.

== Biography ==
Leslie was born on November 15, 1787, in Philadelphia, Pennsylvania, to Lydia Baker and Robert Leslie, both originally from Maryland. Her father, a clock and watchmaker, was a friend of Benjamin Franklin and Thomas Jefferson, according to Eliza. The family moved to England in 1793 when Leslie was five years old for about six years. She was the eldest of five children. Two of her siblings, Charles Robert Leslie, who lived in London, and Anna Leslie, were artists. Her brother Thomas Jefferson Leslie graduated from West Point and her other sister, Martha “Patty,” married the book publisher Henry Charles Carey.

Following Robert Leslie's death in 1803, Lydia Leslie operated a series of boarding houses in Philadelphia. The family moved from their home on High Street to a boarding house on South Sixth Street, then Spruce Street, and, finally, to 1 Minor for the last two years of Lydia's life before she died in 1824. Eliza Leslie attended the cooking school of the famed Mrs. Goodfellow for two terms, and her first book was based on notes she had taken of Goodfellow's class recipes, although in the introduction she insisted the recipes were "original, and have been used by the author and many of her friends with uniform success." Seventy-Five Receipts for Pastry, Cakes, and Sweetmeats first published in 1828, became a success and went through eleven editions until 1839.

== Career ==
Leslie's Directions for Cookery, in its Various Branches (1837), sold at least 150,000 copies and stayed in print into the 1890s, making it the most popular cookbook of the century. It was a generalized work, written to appeal to all classes and to city or rural dwellers from all regions. Some of her nine cookbooks were more specialized. Using the French she learned as a child, Leslie translated French recipes for Domestic French Cookery (1832) and wrote an entire book on cornmeal recipes, The Indian Meal Book (1847).

She was a prolific writer of fiction and nonfiction works for juveniles and adults. Almost yearly, between 1836 and 1845, Leslie edited an annual gift book called The Gift: A Christmas and New Year’s Present, with contributions from Edgar Allan Poe (which included the first appearances of five short stories including "William Wilson", "Eleonora", "The Pit and the Pendulum," "The Purloined Letter," and the first book appearance of "Manuscript Found in A Bottle"), Henry Wadsworth Longfellow, and Ralph Waldo Emerson. She also contributed to Godey's Lady's Book, Graham's Magazine, Saturday Gazette, and Saturday Evening Post. Her 1842 story "The Beaux, A Sketch" has been suggested by Sarah Glosson as the earliest-known published derivative work based on Jane Austen.

== Publications ==
- Seventy-Five Receipts for Pastry, Cakes, and Sweetmeats (1828) 1836.
- American Girl's Book, 1831.
- Domestic French Cookery, 1832.
- Pencil Sketches; or, Outlines of Characters and Manners, 1833.
- Miss Leslie's Behavior Book, 1834.
- Directions for Cookery, in its Various Branches (1837) 1844
- The Gift: A Christmas and New Year’s Present 1837, 1839–40, 1842–45
- Miss Leslie's Lady's New Receipt-Book (1840) 1850
- The Indian Meal Book, 1847.
- The Lady's Receipt-Book: A Useful Companion for Large or Small Families, 1847.
- Amelia; or, A Young Lady's Vicissitudes, 1848.
- Miss Leslie's Lady's New Receipt-Book, 1850.
- Miss Leslie's Directions for Cookery, 1851.
- More Receipts, 1852.
- Stories for Summer Days and Winter Nights, 1853.
- New Receipts for Cooking 1854
- New Cookery Book, 1857
