= Pound cake =

Type of cake

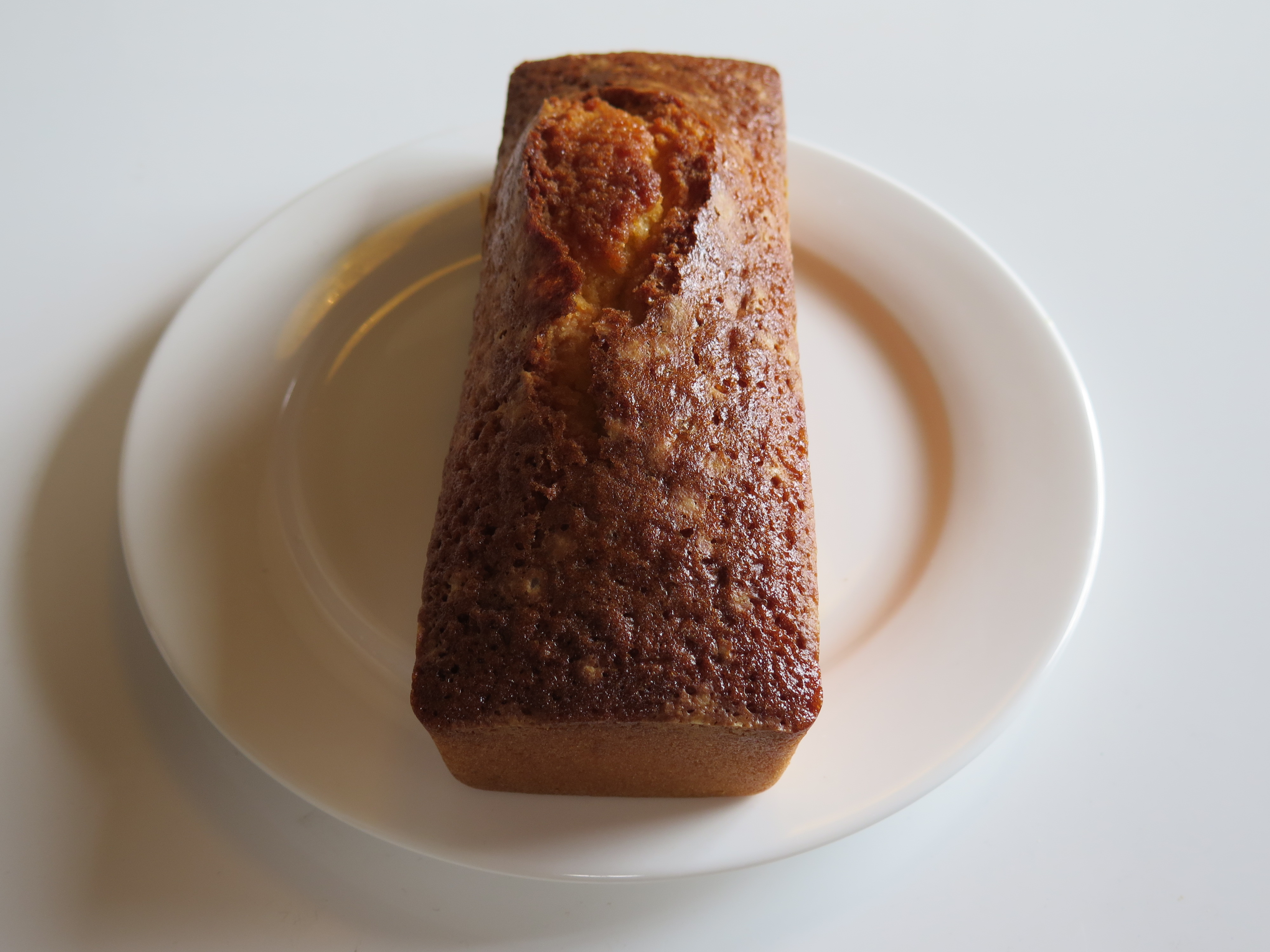
- A pound cake that has been baked in a loaf pan
- Region or state: England
- Main ingredients: Flour, butter, sugar, and eggs
- Variations: Addition of flavourings or dried fruits

Pound cake is a type of cake traditionally made with a pound of butter. Pound cakes are generally baked in either a loaf pan or a Bundt mould. They are sometimes served either dusted with powdered sugar, lightly glazed with syrup, with a coat of icing, or with whipped cream and fruit. Although the recipe was first recorded in England, the British rarely use the term instead calling them a traditional sponge cake or creamed sponge, while Australians use the term butter cake.

== History ==
The earliest recipe for pound cake is found in the English cook book The Art of Cookery by Hannah Glasse, published in 1747. The first U.S. cookbook, American Cookery, published in 1796, has a recipe for pound cake.

Over time, the ingredients for pound cake changed. Eliza Leslie, who wrote the 1851 edition of Direction for Cookery, used 10 eggs, beat them as lightly as possible, mixed them with a pound of flour, then added wine, brandy, rose water and the juice of two lemons or three large oranges. This changed the flavour and texture of the cake. In the 2008 issue of Saveur, James Villas wrote that cake flour would not work in place of all-purpose flour because it lacks the strength to support the heavy batter.

In some recipes from 19th century cookbooks, fruit was also added to the cake.

An early variation on this cake replaced some of the flour with cornmeal made from dried corn (maize), which was then called Indian meal. A recipe for Indian pound cake was published by Eliza Leslie in London in 1846, when people in Ireland were looking for alternatives to expensive wheat flour.

== Variations ==
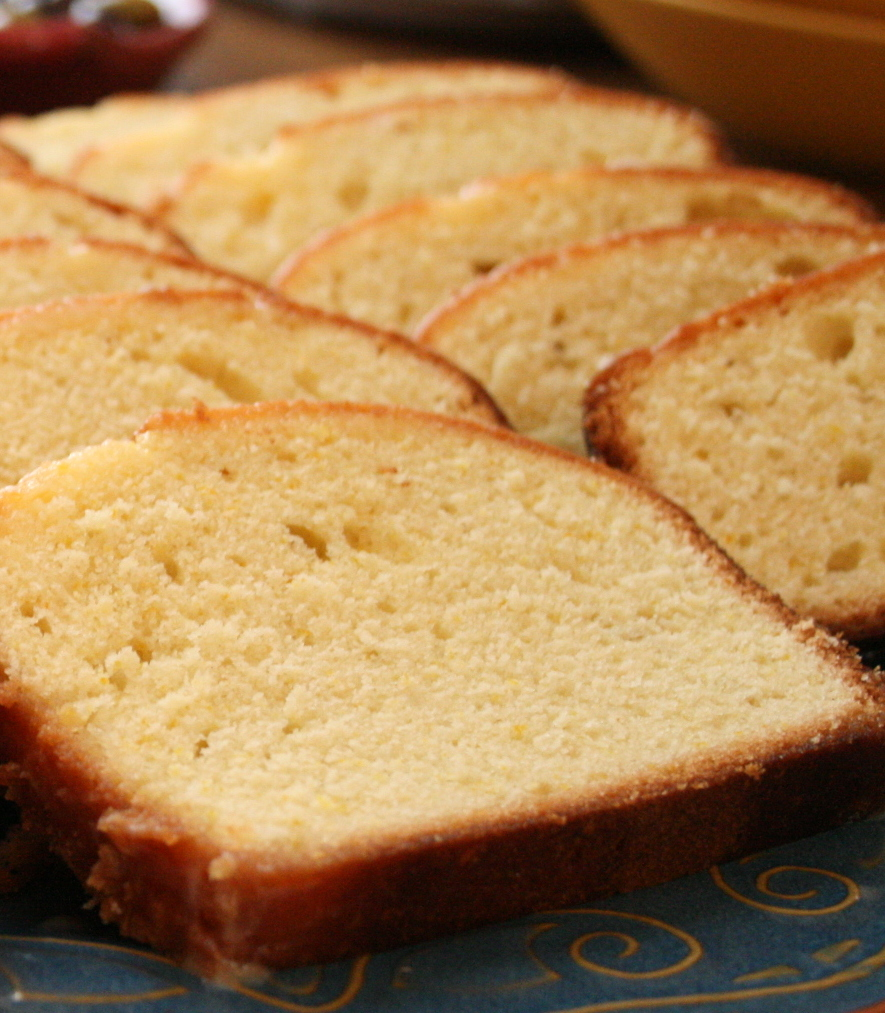
Slices of pound cake

There are numerous variations on the traditional pound cake, with certain countries and regions having distinctive styles. These can include the addition of flavouring agents (such as vanilla extract or almond extract) or dried fruit (such as currants or dried cranberries), as well as alterations to the original recipe to change the characteristics of the resulting pound cake. For instance, baking soda or baking powder may be incorporated to induce leavening during baking, resulting in a less dense pound cake. A cooking oil (typically a vegetable oil) is sometimes substituted for some or all of the butter, which is intended to produce a moister cake. Sour cream pound cake is a popular variation in the United States, which involves the substitution of sour cream for some of the butter, which also is intended to produce a moister cake with a tangy flavour. Some of these variations may drastically change the texture and flavour of the pound cake, but the name pound cake is often still used. Some of the variations are described below.

=== French style ===
Pound cake is served in France. The French name for the pound cake, quatre-quarts, means four quarters. There are equal weights in each of the four quarters. Traditionally, the cake of the French region of Brittany uses the same quantity of the four ingredients, but with no added fruit of any kind. However, the French-speaking parts of the Caribbean traditionally add rum to the ingredients for Christmas Eve or even mashed bananas for extra moisture. In some cases, they might have beaten egg whites instead of whole eggs to lighten the batter. Other variants include adding chocolate or lemon juice for flavour.

=== Mexican style ===
In Mexico, the pound cake is called panqué. The basic recipe of Mexican panqué is much like the traditional U.S. recipe. Most common variants are panqué con nueces (pound cake with nuts) and panqué con pasas (pound cake with raisins).

=== Colombian style ===
Ponqué is the Colombian version of the pound cake: the term ponqué is itself a Spanish phonetic approximation of pound-cake. The ponqué is essentially a wine-drenched cake with a cream or sugar coating, and it is very popular at birthdays, weddings and other social celebrations.

=== German style ===
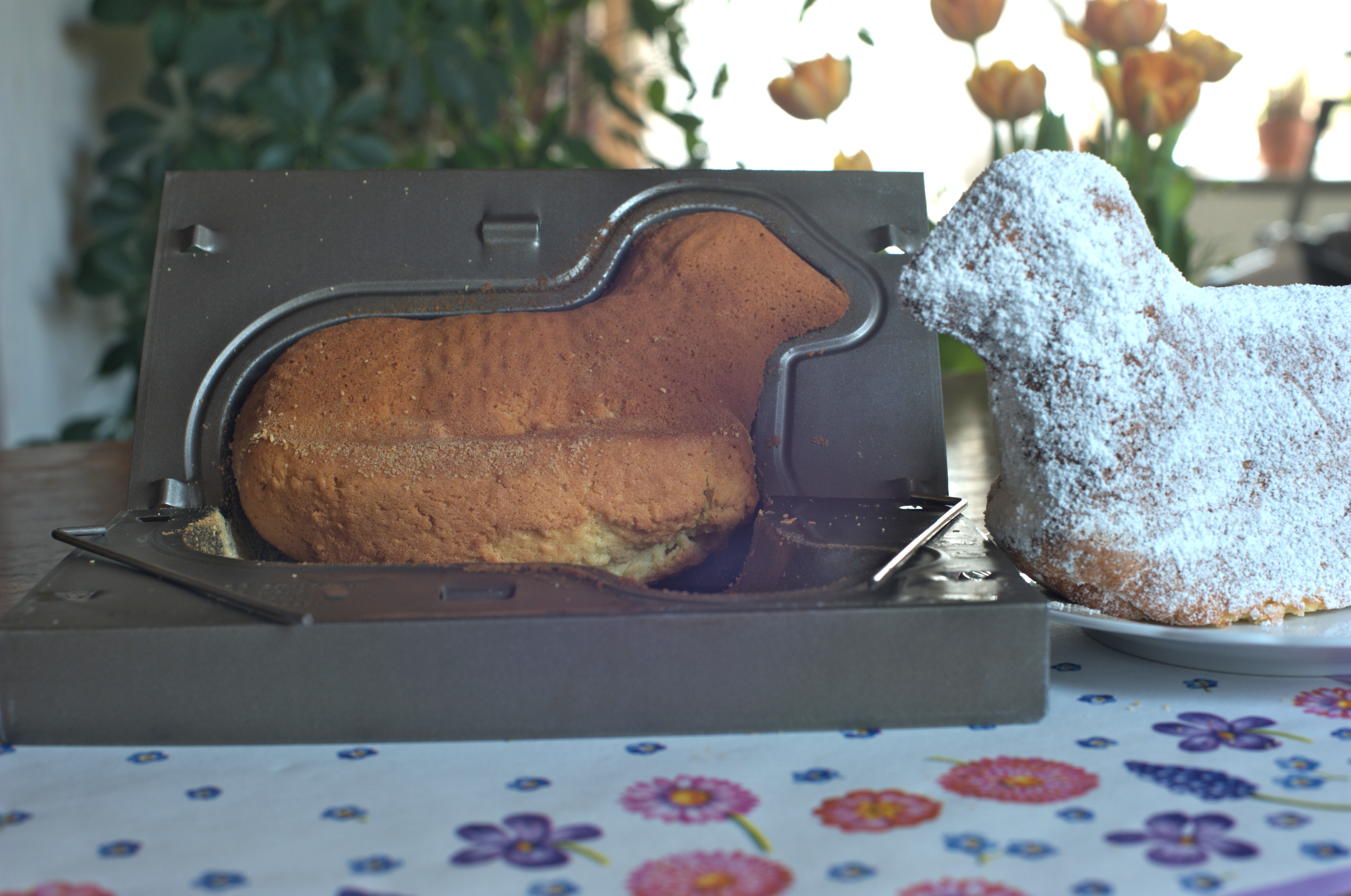
Traditional German Osterlamm, which often is made of Eischwerteig mit Fett

The German term Rührkuchen (stirred cake) refers to any kind of cake where a batter is made by mixing flour, butter, eggs, sugar, and often milk. The concept of the first four ingredients having equal proportions is not common, but, nevertheless, this style of cake batter forms the basis of many popular cake recipes. With the simple addition of nuts, cocoa, dried fruits and alcohols, and the use of different shapes and sizes of tins, a wide variety of traditional German cakes are made. For example, this dough or a minor variation of it is often used to make cakes made in a loaf tin (Orangenkuchen - orange cake; Nusskuchen - hazelnut cake), marbled cakes in a bundt tin (Marmorkuchen ) and other flavour combinations in shaped tins (Falscher Rehrücken - fake venison saddle with bitter chocolate and almonds, Osterlamm - Easter Lamb with vanilla and rum).

In the technical language of professional baking, these recipes are classified as Eischwerteig mit Fett ("egg-heavy batter with shortening"). For example, in a German cooks' vocational school book from the 1980s the basic recipe for such a cake baked in a 26 cm (10") spring form tin is given as four eggs, three egg-weights of butter, four egg-weights of sugar, three egg-weights of flour and one egg-weight of starch. It is close to the English pound of each and the French four equal quarters.

== Cherry cake ==
Cherry cake
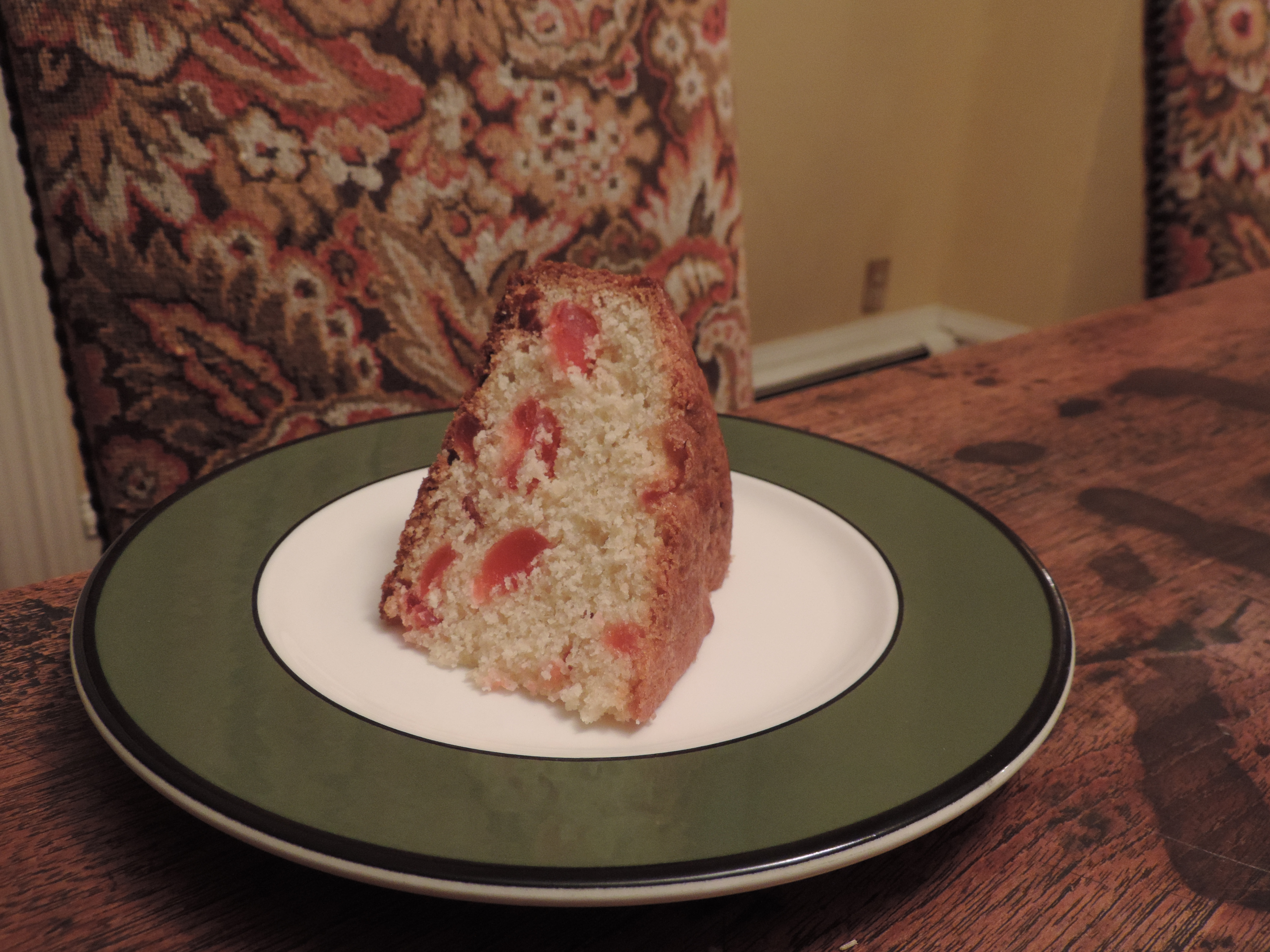
- A slice of traditional British cherry cake
- Type: Cake
- Course: Dessert
- Serving temperature: Cold or warmed
- Main ingredients: Glacé cherries and cake batter
- Similar dishes: Fruitcake

Cherry cake is a traditional British cake. The cake consists of glacé cherries evenly suspended within a Madeira sponge; it can also be considered as a basic or trivial variation of pound cake. Glacé cherries are used because the moisture within fresh cherries causes them to sink to the bottom of any cake, ruining the cake's form.

Cakes with cherries inside them are found in many other cuisines.

== See also ==
- Madeira cake
