= Alguashte =

Salvadoran seasoning

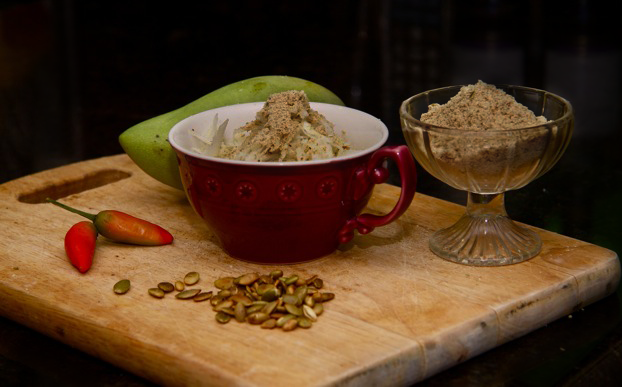
Homemade alguashte served on unripe mango.

Alguashte is a seasoning typical of Honduran and Salvadoran cuisine made from ground pepitas (pumpkin seeds), and is used on both sweet or savoury meals. Simple to make, it is often prepared at home; however, it can also be purchased pre-packaged as well as from street vendors, often as an addition to a meal or snack. It is added to fruits such as unripe mango, as well as dishes such as shuco and chicken.

== Etymology ==
Alguashte,, aiguaste alguaixte, or ainguaste: from the Nahuatl ayotli ('pumpkin') and huactli ('seed').

== History ==
While its origin is not known, alguashte likely is of Mayan origins as pepitas have been consumed in Mesoamerica for several centuries.
