= Elizabeth Goodfellow =

American cooking teacher (c.1767–1851)

Elizabeth Goodfellow (c.1767–1851), generally called Mrs. Goodfellow, started one of the first cooking schools in America. She taught classes for thirty years, and her recipes and techniques were passed on for generations in the cookbooks of one of her students, Eliza Leslie. Goodfellow also ran a renowned bakery and confectionery in Philadelphia during the first fifty years of the 19th century.

== Personal life ==
The life of Mrs. Goodfellow is largely unknown. Elizabeth Pearson, pastry cook, was already married and running a successful business on Philadelphia's Dock Street by 1801. Her daughter, Sarah Anne, had been born the year before. Robert Coane, her second husband, and she had a son Robert Coane (1804-1877) who would become a partner in the store in 1837. Lastly, she married William Goodfellow, a clockmaker, in 1808, but he died ten years later. According to her obituary, Mrs. Elizabeth Goodfellow died on January 5, 1851, at age 83 in Philadelphia, so she was most likely born in 1767.

Sarah Anne Pearson (1800-1826) married French expatriate Michel Bouvier on June 4, 1822.

== Career ==
For a half-century, her highly successful shop was located on three streets: Dock, South Second and finally Sixth Street, moving further from the Delaware River docks each time. She was well known for her pies and cakes, particularly Lemon Pies, Cocoanut Pies, Spanish Buns and Jumbles (later, recipes for those in particular, labeled with the famous name ‘Mrs. Goodfellow,’ appeared in several cookbooks). Her reputation soon led to her teaching cooking classes, with equally positive results, lasting thirty years.

Daughters from wealthy families attended her classes as a part of their education to prepare to enter society. One of her students from a prominent family, Susan Israel Painter (1790-1845), the daughter of Revolutionary War General Joseph Israel from Delaware graduated in 1807, and married four years later. Many of her handwritten recipes were included in the Colonial Receipt Book: Celebrated Old Receipts Used a Century Ago by Mrs Goodfellow’s Cooking School.

Another student, Eliza Leslie (1787-1858), compiled her teacher's recipes into the first of many extremely popular cookbooks, Seventy-five Receipts for Pastry, Cakes, and Sweetmeats in 1828. Leslie took two of Goodfellow's courses sometime after her father died and her mother was forced to manage a succession of boarding houses. As a student, she took many notes, and over the years, friends would ask her for copies. Her brother suggested that she compile some of them into a book so she did not have to copy the recipes each time.

As part of her recipe for Goodfellow's famous lemon pie, Leslie wrote: "A genuine baked lemon pudding (such as was introduced by the justly celebrated Mrs. Goodfellow), and is well known at Philadelphia dinner parties, must have no flour or bread whatever. The mixture only of butter, sugar, and eggs, (with the proper flavoring) and when baked it cuts down smooth and shining, like a nice custard. Made this way, they are among the most delicious of puddings…" The recipe used whole eggs in the filling, so it's improbable that Goodfellow created the lemon meringue pie - with egg yolk filling and the leftover egg whites whipped for meringue topping.

== Legacy ==
For years after her death Mrs. Goodfellow would be remembered by her students, their families ("many a household, for years after, bore evidence of her skill in teaching") and her customers. Months after she died, Mrs. Goodfellow's cocoanut pie was vividly recalled by a Philadelphian reporter stationed in Europe. William Henry Fry wrote an article for Sartain’s Union Magazine (a Philadelphia magazine), about an acrobatic horseman, trained at the riding school of Philadelphia, performing at the Paris Hippodrome in 1851. The rider did seventy consecutive somersaults and other equestrian vaulting marvels. Perhaps nostalgic for a favorite dessert, Fry suggested another Philadelphia school - the Goodfellow cooking school - would do well in Paris, and compared her cocoanut pudding to the best of the extravagant displays by the French chef François Vatel from the 17th century.

Although Mrs. Goodfellow never wrote a cookbook, her recipes appeared in a variety of cookbooks, such as one by a Quaker from Philadelphia, Elizabeth Nicholson's What I Know, or, Hints on the Daily Duties of a Housekeeper. That and a second book were published in Philadelphia in 1856, five years after she died. Cookery as it Should be: new manual of the dining room and kitchen, for persons in moderate circumstances was written by a former student, who "experimented" with the more modern recipes. The same book was published almost a decade later and retitled Mrs. Goodfellow’s Cookery as it Should be. It was claimed to be written by Mrs. Goodfellow, which it obviously was not. Other cookbooks contained recipes identified with her name. However, it was Eliza Leslie's first cookbook, and to a lesser degree her other books, which allowed Mrs. Goodfellow's teaching to influence generations of cooks. Mrs. Goodfellow stressed quality ingredients, thus her baked goods "were always excellently made, nothing being spared that was good." Leslie followed Goodfellow's recipe layout by putting the ingredients first, rather than in the usual paragraph format, in her Seventy five Receipts for Pastry, Cakes, and Sweetmeats.
