= Coconut pudding =

Coconut pudding may refer to

- Cazuela, rich pumpkin and coconut pudding
- Coconut bar, Chinese food
- Haupia, Hawaiian coconut pudding
- Maja blanca, Filipino dessert
- Manjar blanco, variety of milk-based sweets
- Manjar branco, Brazilian coconut pudding
- Rēti'a, Tahitian coconut pudding
- Tembleque, Puerto Rican coconut pudding
- Thai coconut pudding (disambiguation)
