= Tibok-tibok =

Kampampangan dessert pudding

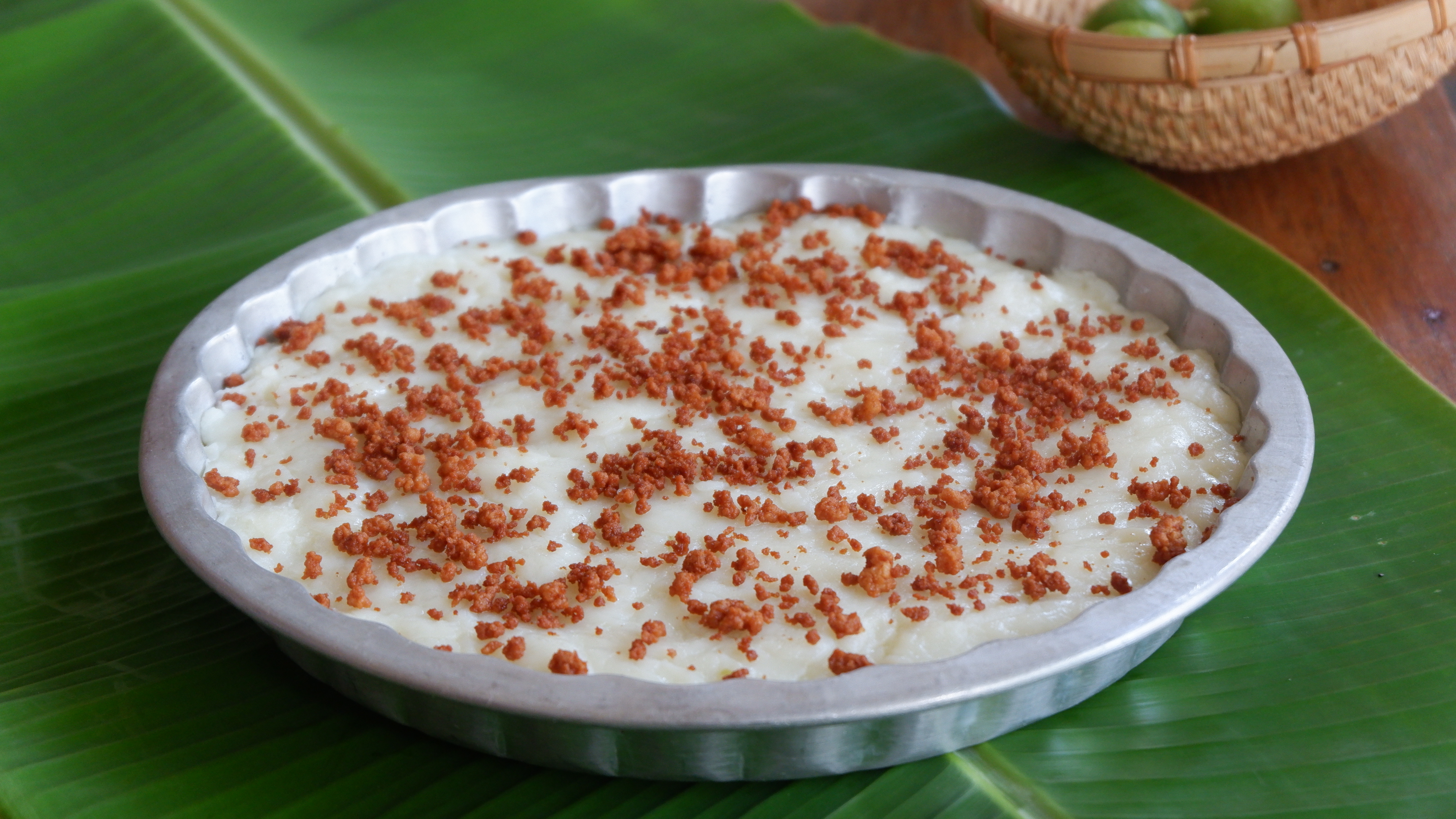
- Alternative names: carabao-milk pudding
- Course: Dessert
- Place of origin: Philippines
- Region or state: Pampanga, Cagayan
- Serving temperature: room temperature, cold
- Similar dishes: Maja blanca, blancmange, leche flan

Tibok-tibok (Pampangan: tibuktíbuk) or carabao-milk pudding is a Pampangan dessert pudding made primarily from carabao (water buffalo) milk and ground soaked glutinous rice (galapóng). Originating in the Philippine province of Pampanga, it is especially popular in Cagayan. It has a soft jelly-like texture and is topped with latík (coconut milk curds) before serving. It is characteristically creamy white in color and has a delicate, sweet and slightly salty flavor. It is very similar to the more common maja blanca, albeit the latter is made with coconut milk and cornstarch.

== Etymology ==
The name tibok-tibok literally means "[like a] heartbeat". This is due to the method of determining if the dish is cooked. Once it has reduced to a firm consistency, the bubbles barely break the surface, making it look like it is pulsating.

== Preparation ==
Tibok-tibok is prepared similarly to maja blanca. Carabao milk is traditionally mixed with a small amount of galapóng, ground glutinous rice that has been soaked overnight. It is flavored with a small amount of white sugar and dayap (Citrus aurantifolia) zest. It is simmered at low heat while stirring continuously until the mixture thickens. It is immediately poured into a flat pan lined with greased banana leaves and allowed to cool, or into moulds. It is usually served as squares or in diamond-shaped slices, and topped with latík (coconut curds). It is stored in airtight containers to prevent it from drying out.

Carabao milk can be substituted with whole fat cow's milk in areas where it is not available. Less traditional preparations might also substitute rice flour or cornstarch for galapóng, or exclude it altogether.

== See also ==
- Kesong puti
- Espasol
- Leche flan
- Sapin-sapin
