= Tembleque =

Coconut dessert pudding from Puerto Rico

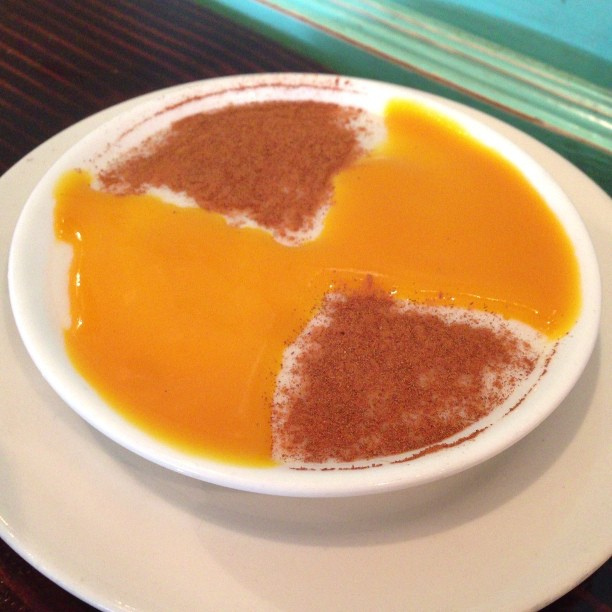
- Type: Pudding
- Course: Dessert
- Place of origin: Puerto Rico
- Region or state: Puerto Rico
- Main ingredients: Coconut milk, cornstarch, sugar, and cinnamon

Tembleque is a coconut dessert pudding from Puerto Rico similar to blancmange and related to Catalan menjar blanc and Filipino maja blanca. It is one of the best-known desserts in Puerto Rican cuisine.

== Ingredients ==
Tembleque is a dessert crafted by gently simmering coconut milk with a pinch of salt, cornstarch, and sugar. Once mixed, it's poured into a mold and left to chill until it reaches a smooth and firm consistency, reminiscent of pudding, and is often topped with a sprinkle of ground cinnamon.

In recent years, family recipes for tembleque have evolved, making each version distinctive. Some variations include additions like orange blossom water, spiced tea, vanilla, or heavy cream, while others opt for gelatin or arrowroot starch instead of cornstarch for a cleaner taste and a glossy finish. Restaurants across the island often elevate this dessert by serving it with compote, toasted coconut shavings, or even chocolate shavings.

== Varieties ==
Tembleque has found its way into various treats, such as cakes, cookies, and quesito. One creation is the tembleque crème brûlée pie, which features a harmonious blend of tembleque and cream cheese nestled in a pie crust, topped with a layer of burnt sugar.

Turrón is a nougat made with egg whites, sugar, honey and nuts. This sweet treat is a cherished part of Spanish holiday traditions, and it holds a special place in Puerto Rican Christmas celebrations. Turrón tembleque takes it a step further by combining both recipes and incorporating heavy cream, resulting in a soft and creamy nougat.

== Cultural importance ==
It is a holiday dish, served on New Year's Day throughout the island of Puerto Rico. While the recipe may have originated in Puerto Rico, there are variants on the dish such as manjar blanco in Latin America, manjar branco in Brazil, and maja blanca in the Philippines. According to the Encyclopedia of Puerto Rico, published by the Foundation for the Humanities, each time a Puerto Rican migrant to the United States comes closer and closer to forgetting their roots, foods like tembleque bring them back and remind them of who they are, of their island, and of their grandmother.

== Etymology ==
In Spanish, the word tembleque is an adjective used to describe something that shakes, or a noun to describe the shakes themselves. The dessert, due to its Jell-O-like gel texture, trembles, shivers, and shakes if it has been prepared correctly.

== See also ==
- Coconut bar
- Khanom thuai
- Bebinca
- Haupia
- Maja blanca
- Manjar branco
