= Natas do Céu =

Portuguese dessert

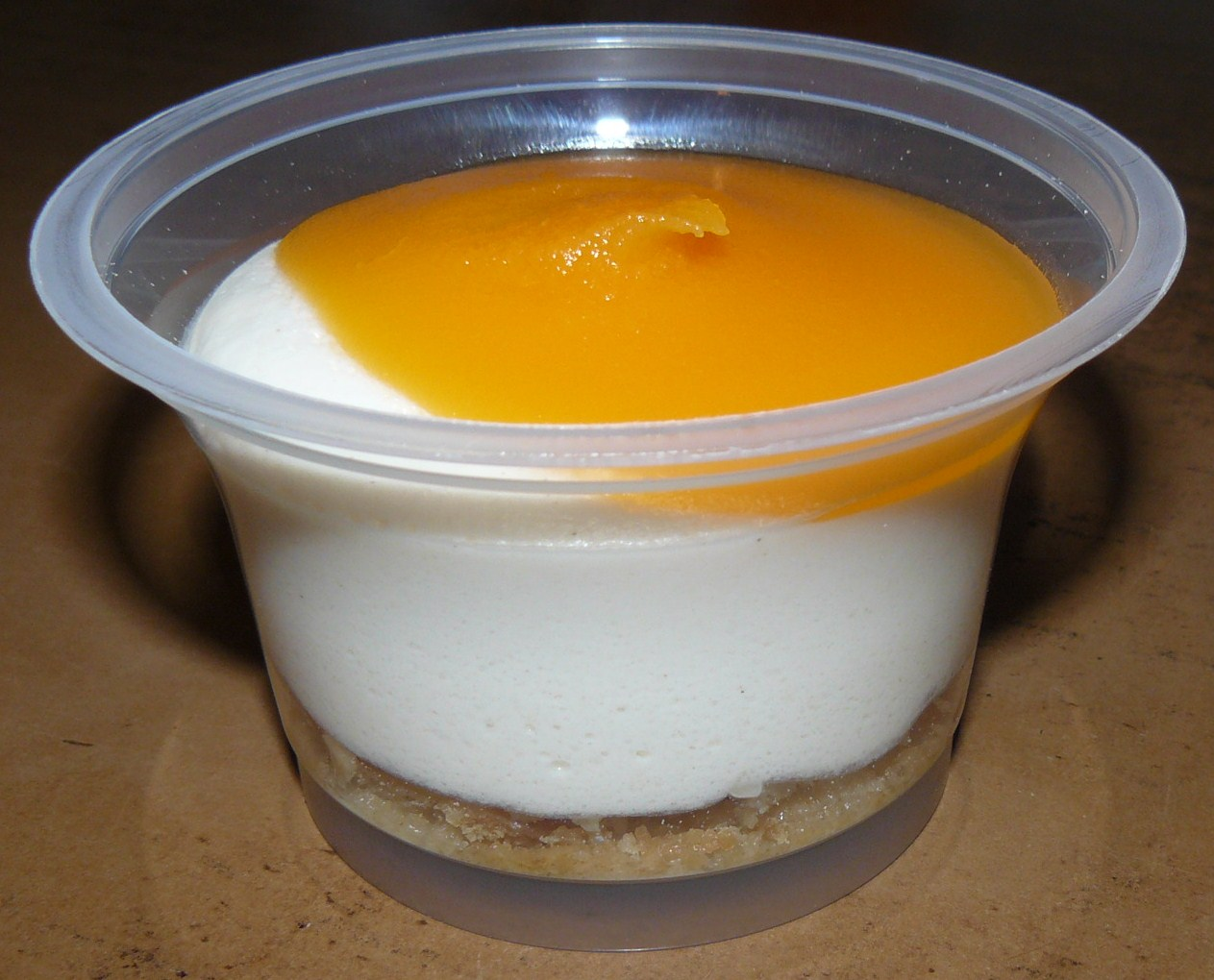
Natas do Céu

Natas do Céu ("cream of the sky" or "heavenly cream") is a layered Portuguese dessert. It consists of whipped cream topped with egg cream, with crumbled cookies at the bottom. The dessert has some similarities to Spanish natillas.

== See also ==
- Portuguese cuisine
- List of Portuguese dishes
