= Hojuela =

Spanish dessert

Hojaldre (Hojuela)
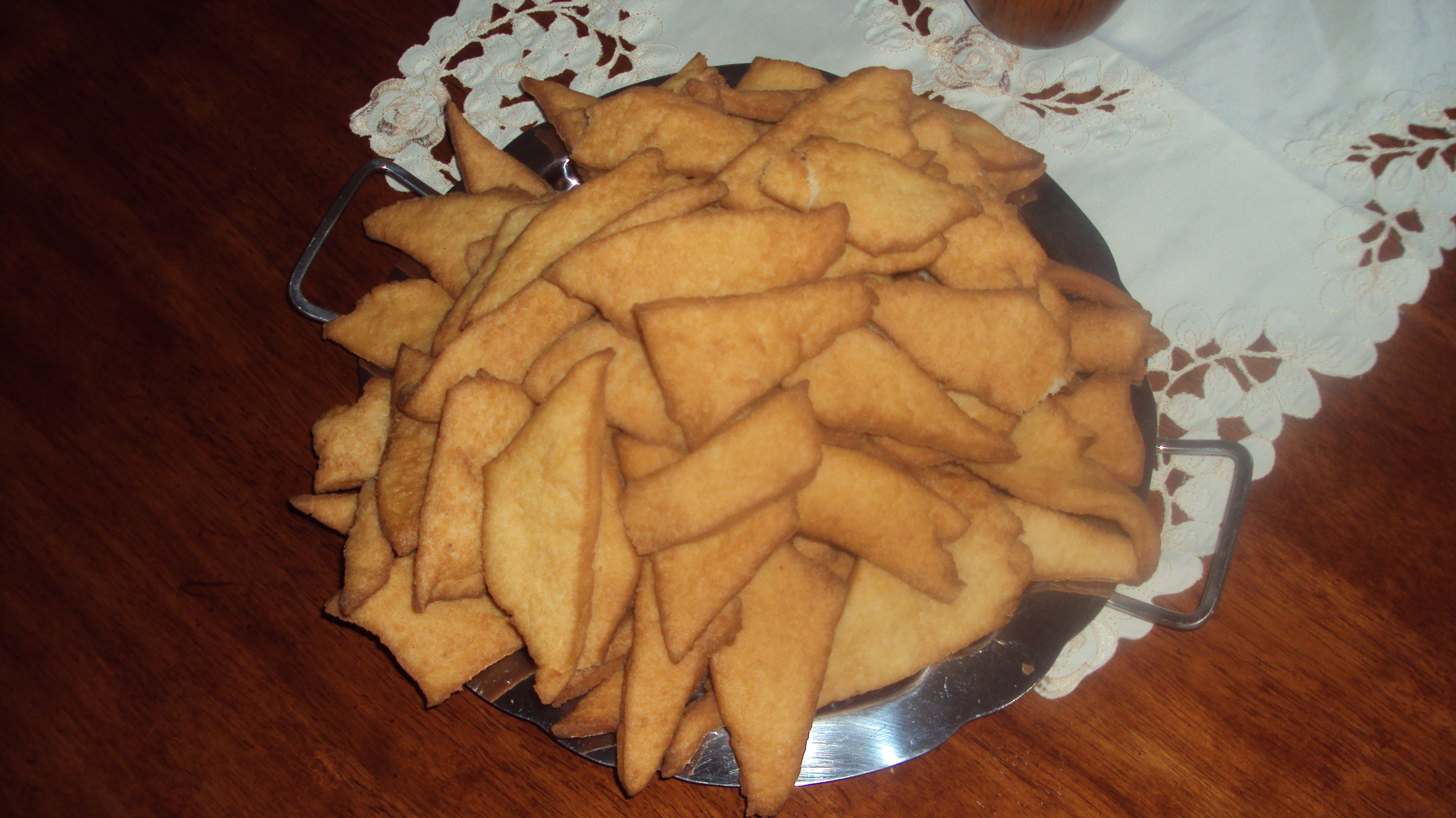
- Type: Dessert
- Place of origin: Spain
- Region or state: Castile-Manchego
- Main ingredients: Flour, Eggs, Sugar

An hojuela (lit. 'flake'), also called an hojaldra, is a traditional Spanish and Latin American sweet fritter originating in Spain. In Latin American countries, especially Colombia, and in Spain, it is commonly made during Holy Week and the Christmas season. Ingredients vary by region, but usually consist of a flour-based batter fried in oil and dusted with sugar or topped with honey.

== Colombia ==
In Colombia, hojuelas are commonly made during the Holiday season. They are generally eaten along with manjar blanco, natillas, and buñuelos. Hojuelas are typically made with wheat flour, eggs, water, and half a cup or less of orange juice. Strips of the batter are fried in vegetable oil.

== Chile ==
In Chile, hojuelas derive from a traditional recipe using palm syrup.

== Spanish saying ==
"Miel sobre hojuelas" is a Spanish saying analogous to the English expression "Icing on the cake". Supposedly, the expression emerged when people added honey over hojuelas rather than sugar, and enjoyed the taste even more. It means something akin to making something good even better.

Alternatively, saying "No todo es miel sobre hojuelas, or "Not everything is honeyed hojuelas", means "It is not all fun and games".

== See also ==
- Fazuelos (Sephardic Jewish pastry, sometimes also referred to as "hojuelas")
