= Buñuelo =

Fried dough ball

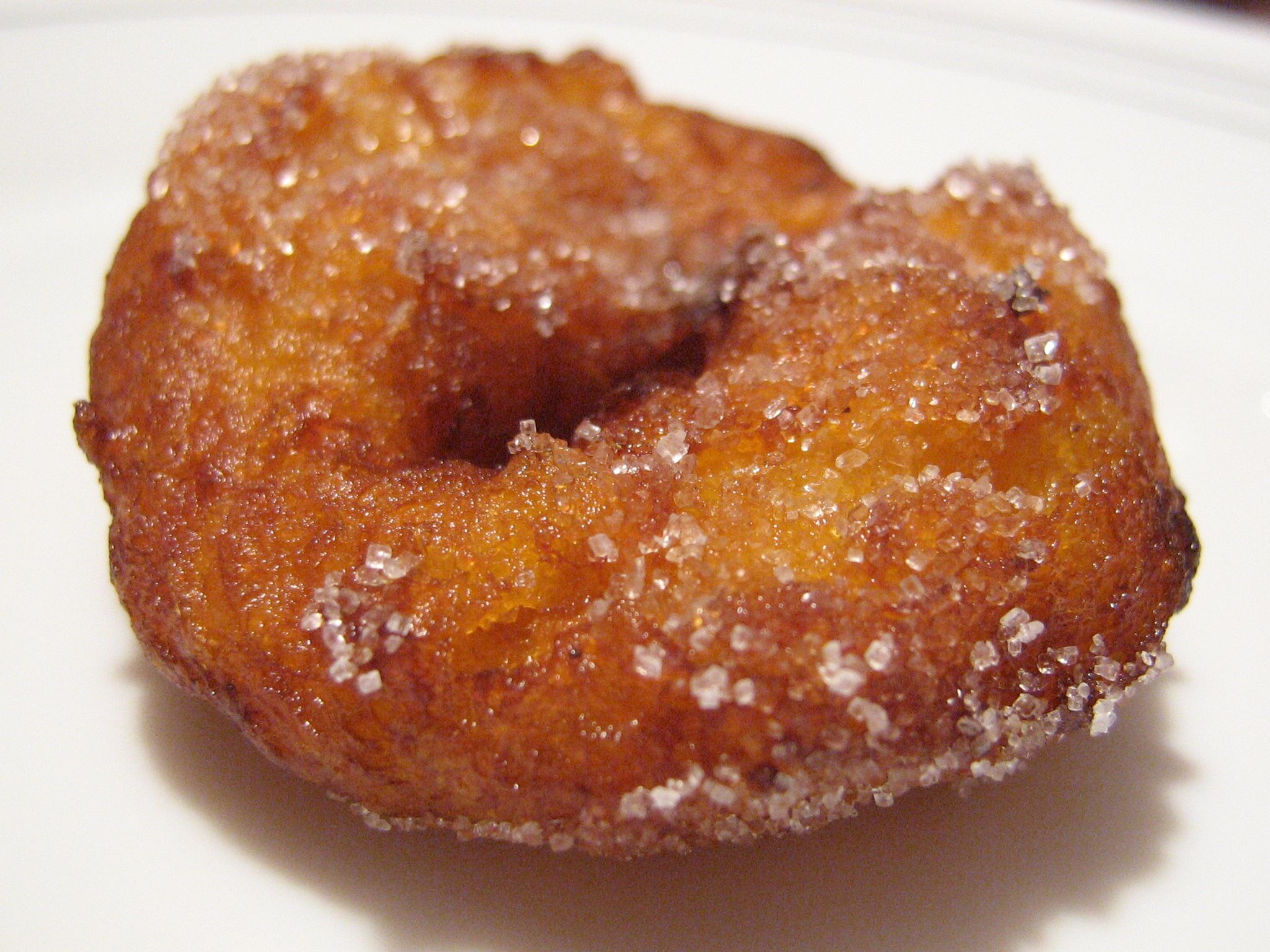
- Typical Spanish pumpkin buñuelo
- Alternative names: Bimuelo, birmuelo, bermuelo, bumuelo, burmuelo, bonuelo
- Type: Doughnut, fritter
- Course: Snack, bread
- Place of origin: Spain
- Region or state: Southwest Europe, Latin America, Southeast Europe, Turkey, Israel, and Spanish influenced parts of Africa and Asia
- Serving temperature: Hot or room temperature

A buñuelo (Spanish: [buˈɲwelo], alternatively called boñuelo, bimuelo, birmuelo, bermuelo, bumuelo, burmuelo, or bonuelo, is a fried dough fritter found in Spain, Latin America, Philippines, and other regions with a historical connection to Spaniards or Sephardic Jews, including Southwest Europe, the Balkans, Anatolia, where the sweet form is called lokma and the rest pişi, and parts of Asia and North Africa. Buñuelos are traditionally prepared at Christmas, Easter, and Hanukkah. They usually have a filling or a topping. In Mexican cuisine, it is often served with a syrup made with piloncillo.

Buñuelos are first known to have been consumed among Spain's Morisco population. They typically consist of a simple, wheat-based yeast dough, often flavored with anise, that is thinly rolled, cut or shaped into individual pieces, then fried and finished off with a sweet topping. Buñuelos may be filled with a variety of things, sweet or savory. They can be round in ball shapes or disc-shaped. In Latin America, buñuelos are seen as a symbol of good luck.

== Etymology ==
"Buñuelo" and all other variations of the word in Spanish derive from the Old Spanish *boño or bonno, which itself derives from the Germanic Gothic language *𐌱𐌿𐌲𐌲𐌾𐍉 (*buggjō, "lump"), and ultimately from Proto-Indo-European *bʰenǵʰ- (thick, dense, fat).

The beignet, which is a French cuisine dough fritter similar to the buñuelo, is etymologically cognate and derives its name via the Germanic Frankish language. Beignet has been borrowed into English via French.

Other cognates include Old High German bungo ("swelling, tuber"), German bunge, Dutch bonk ("lump, clump"), Gaulish *bunia, Scottish Gaelic bonnach ("cake, biscuit").

== History ==
Dough fritters are known in Mediterranean cuisine from the work of Cato the Elder, who included a recipe with the name "balloons" in his book De Agri Cultura, which was written in the second century BC. In that recipe, flour and cheese balls were fried and served with a spread made of honey and poppy seeds.

A 19th-century recipe from California, described as pasta de freir (dough to fry), is made by folding whipped egg whites into a mixture of flour, water, sugar, oil, and orange blossom water. This is used as a batter to fry apples or other fruit. A variation called suspiros de monjas (nun's sighs) includes butter and egg yolks. Buñuelos de Valparaiso are garnished with walnuts and sherry or maraschino flavored simple syrup.

== Regional adaptations ==
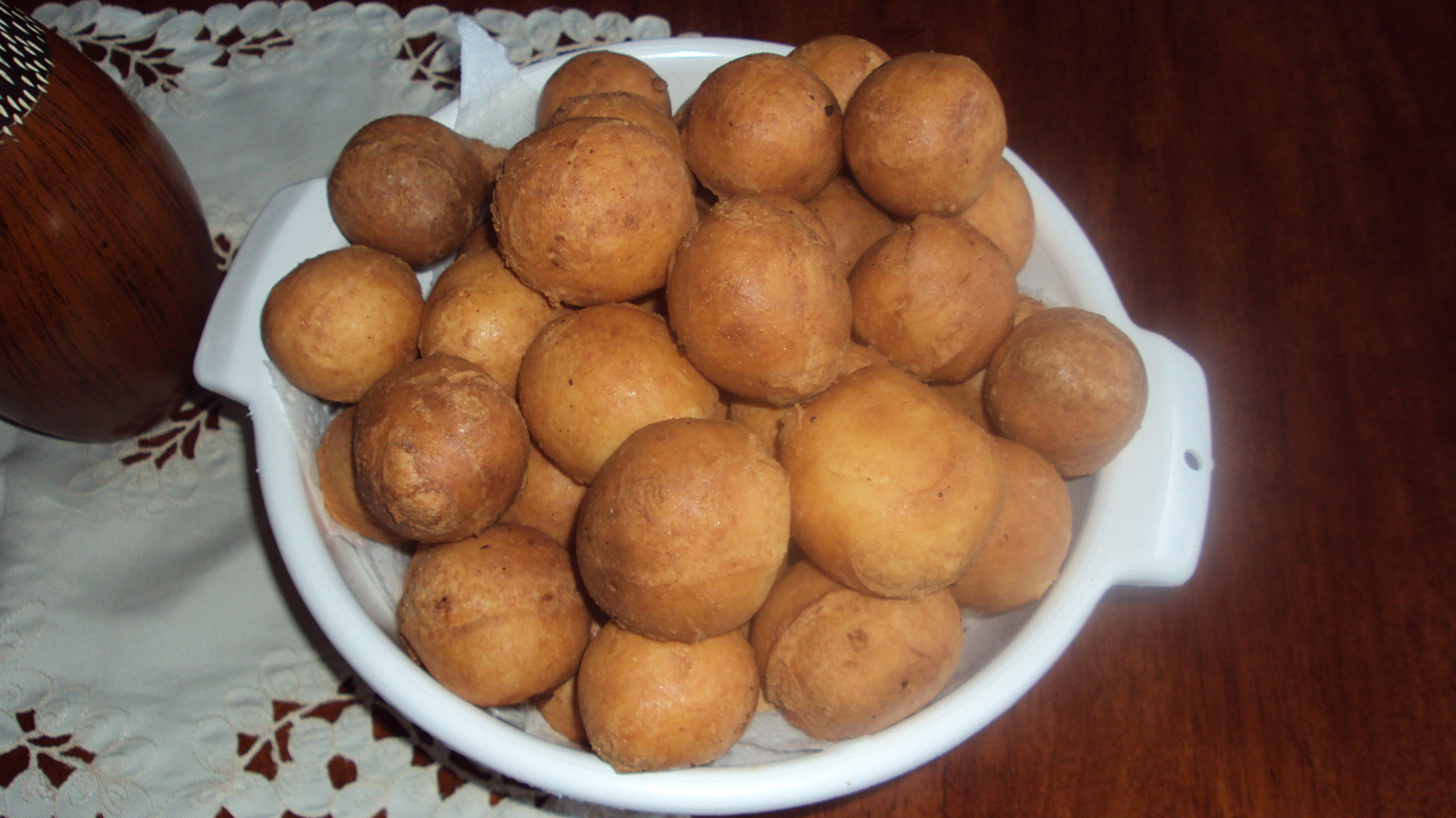
Homemade Colombian buñuelos

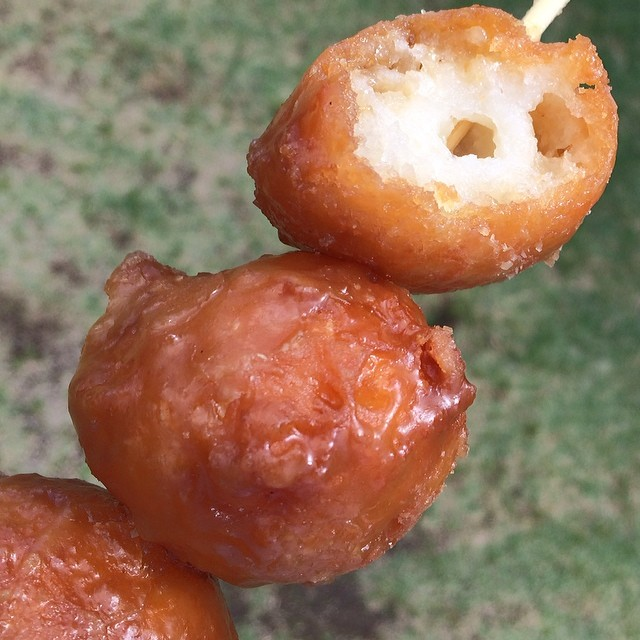
Cascaron, a Filipino derivative made with ground glutinous rice

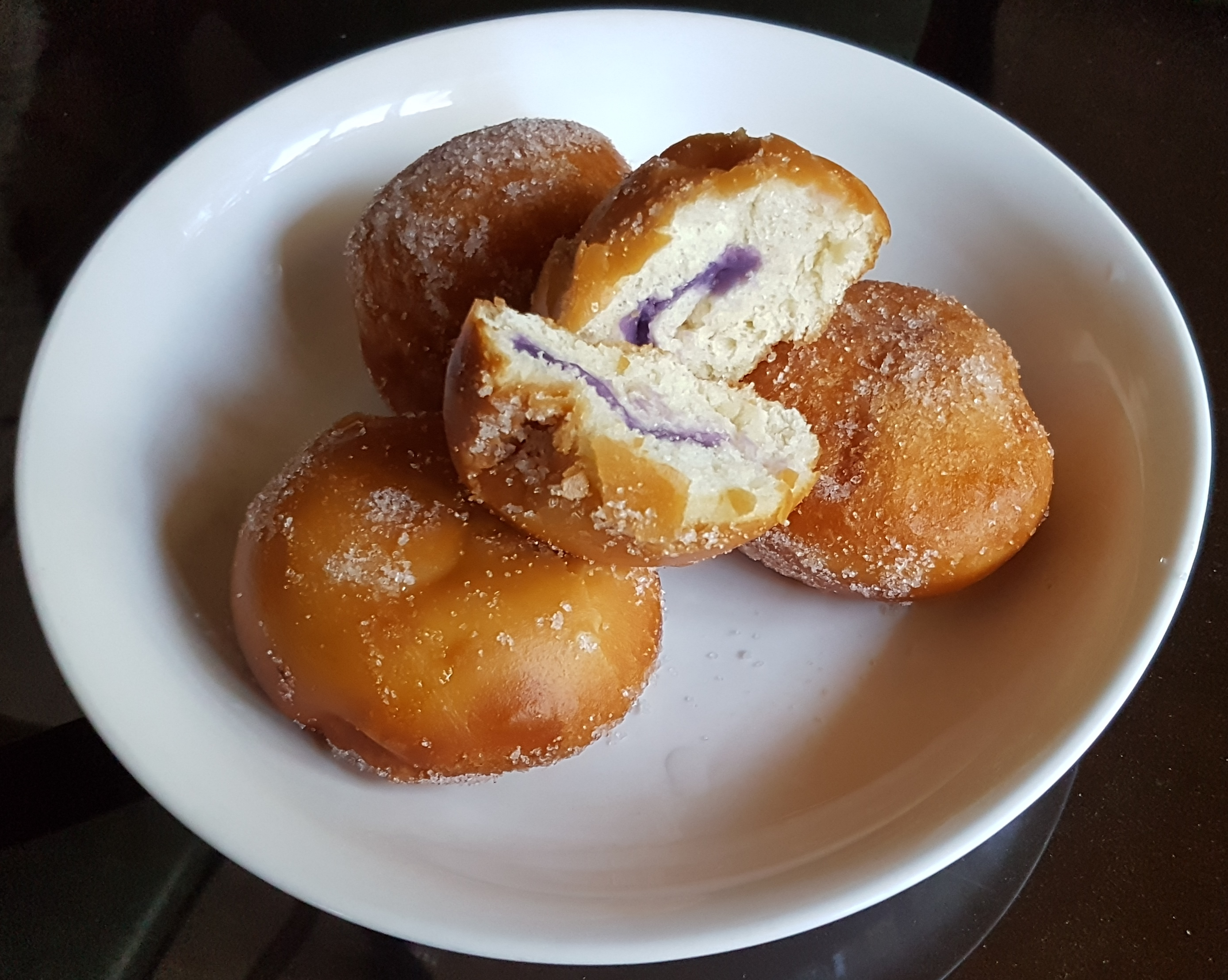
Filipino bunwelos with ube filling

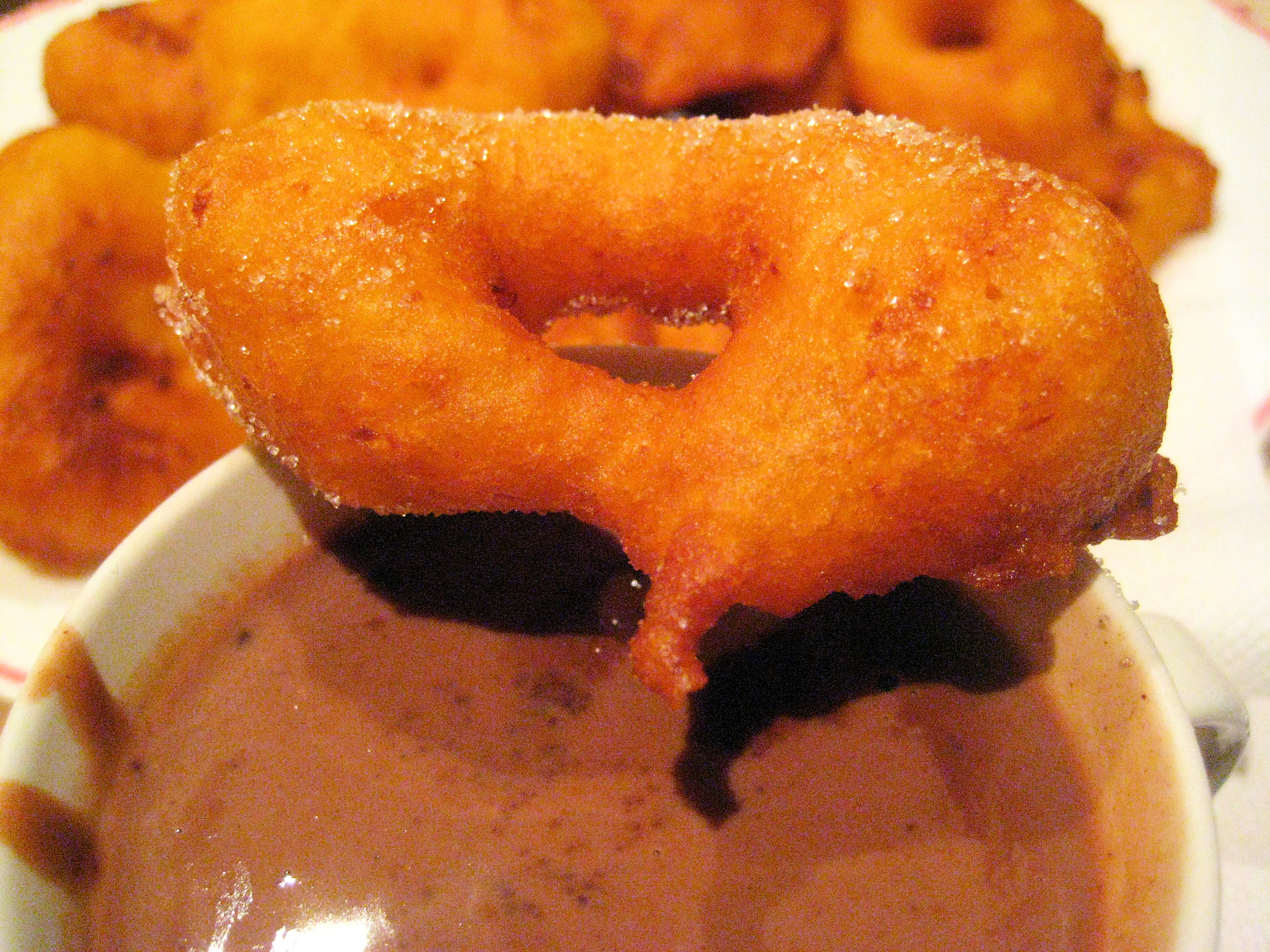
Chocolate fritters

- In Spain, buñuelos are a dessert and snack typical in many autonomous communities and, especially, during their regional holidays. Each territory incorporates its own ingredients and its own traditions. One of the best known is the buñuelo de viento ('wind buñuelo'), a species of fritter.
  - In Catalonia, they are consumed mostly during Lent. The most famous are those of wind, cream and Brunyols de l'Empordà. They are usually eaten as a snack or to accompany coffee after lunch. In some regions of Spain, buñuelos find a strong competitor in churros, which are increasingly widespread at parties normally associated with buñuelos. On the other hand, in Catalonia, churros are primarily consumed by tourists; Catalans prefer the xuixos or chuchos in churrerías or the buñuelos in their multiple forms in bakeries or in houses.
  - In Valencia, the highest consumption is concentrated in festivities such as Fallas de Valencia, where pumpkin buñuelos are made.
  - In the Balearic Islands, there are sweet fritters for different parties of the year (Las Vírgenes, Todos los Santos, Lent, etc.) and, depending on the occasion, they can contain potato or sweet potato, Mahón cheese, dried figs, etc.
  - In Madrid and Andalusia, they are consumed with special assiduity during the Festival of Saints, during which it was customary for women to prepare them in the houses and sell them or give them to neighbors, especially in the villages.
- In Colombia, they are made with a small curd white cheese and formed into doughy balls, then fried golden brown. They use cassava flour and cornmeal instead of wheat. It is a traditional Christmas dish, served along with natillas and manjar blanco.
- In Cuba, they are traditionally twisted in a figure 8 and covered in an anise caramel. The dough contains cassava and malanga.
- In the Dominican Republic, buñuelos are rolled into balls from a dough made of cassava (called yuca) and eggs. They are then covered in a cinnamon sugar syrup, often using coconut milk instead of water.
- In Nicaragua, buñuelos are made from cassava, eggs, and white grating cheese. The buñuelos are rolled into balls and deep-fried. They are served alongside a syrup made of sugar, water, cinnamon sticks, and cloves. They are eaten year-round and are a typical side dish or snack served during holidays.
- In the Philippines, buñuelos (also called bunwelos, bunuelos, binowilos, etc.) can be shaped like a ball, a pancake, a cylinder, or even a doughnut. They are commonly eaten with tsokolate, the local hot chocolate drink. There are also unique local variants of buñuelos, the most common is cascaron (also bitsu-bitsu) which is made with ground glutinous rice (galapong) rather than regular flour. Another variant is bunwelos na saging, which is made with mashed bananas added into the mixture, similar to maruya, a Filipino banana fritter.
- In Puerto Rico, buñuelos are small and round. The dough is often made with milk, baking powder, sugar, eggs, and a starch. Apio, cornmeal, cassava, chickpeas, almond flour, rice, squash, sweet potatoes, taro, potatoes, yams, ripe breadfruit, and sweet plantains are some of the starches used. There are more than twenty buñuelos recipes in Puerto Rico. Often rolled in cornstarch before frying or fried just as. Recipes have been written in Puerto Rican cuisine scenes of the 19th century. They are often filled with cheese and ham for breakfast. They are popular around Christmas and are served in anis flavored syrup. Lemon peel, rum, guava, cinnamon, and vanilla can also be added to the syrup.
- In Mexico buñuelos are made from a yeasted dough with a hint of anise that is deep-fried, then drenched in a syrup of brown sugar, cinnamon, and guava. Buñuelos are commonly served in Mexico and other Latin American countries with powdered sugar, a cinnamon and sugar topping, or hot sugar cane syrup (piloncillo) and are sold in fairs, carnivals, and Christmas events such as Las Posadas.
- In Peru, buñuelos resemble picarones in shape (round and ring-shaped) but lack yams or squashes as in picarones. Made of flour, water, sugar, anise, and yeast, they are served with a sweet syrup made of chancaca (sugar cane-derived sweet). They are a common street food native to Arequipa.
- In Italy, they are usually served with cream, and popular during Carnival time, in particular in the North-East of the country.
- In Uruguay, sweet buñuelos are made with apples and bananas and covered in sugar. Salty variations are traditionally made of spinach, cow fat, and seaweed. Seaweed buñuelos are considered a delicacy in Rocha Department.
- In Sephardic Jewish cuisine, bimuelos (also bumuelos or binuelos) are traditionally made from yeasted wheat dough and covered in a honey glaze, sometimes with orange flavour. Sephardic Jews in Turkey traditionally make buñuelos with matzo meal and eat them during Passover.
- In El Salvador, the traditional version of buñuelos are known as nuégados. They are fried dough fritters often made with yuca (cassava), giving them a distinctive texture and flavor. After frying, they are bathed in a rich syrup made from panela (unrefined cane sugar) and spiced with cinnamon sticks. Nuégados are traditionally served with chilate, a hot corn-based beverage flavored with ginger, and are especially popular during Holy Week and other festive occasions. Variations include nuégados de maíz (made with corn dough), nuégados de huevo (made with eggs), nuégados de guineo (made with bananas), and nuégados boca de cántaro, a specialty from Atiquizaya shaped like the mouth of a pitcher and coated in panela syrup.

There are also buñuelos in Turkey, Greece, Cyprus, Morocco, and Belize.

In many Latin American countries, this particular dish can also be made with flour tortillas and covered in sugar or cinnamon.

== In popular culture ==
December 16 is National Buñuelo Day (Día Nacional del Buñuelo). Buñuelo was featured on the Netflix TV series Street Food in season 2.

== See also ==
- Tulumba
- List of fried dough foods
- List of doughnut varieties
- Hojuela
- Mexican breads
