= Thai coconut pudding =

Thai coconut pudding may refer to several Thai desserts:

- Khanom thuai
- Khanom krok
- Coconut jam, known in Thai as sangkhaya
