= Teja (confectionery) =

Confectionery

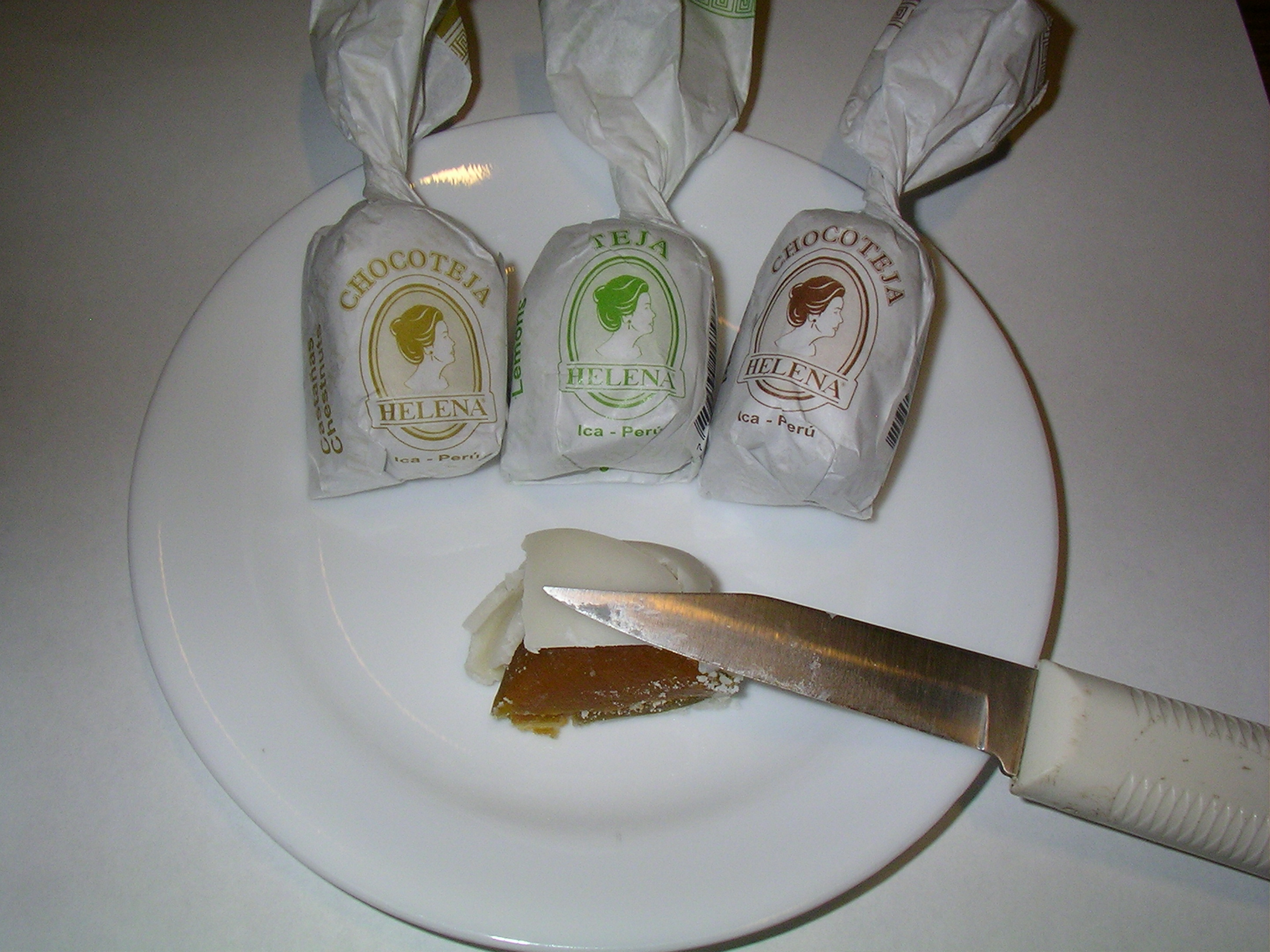
- Teja cut in half showing filling: manjar blanco and candied lemon rind
- Type: Confectionery
- Place of origin: Peru
- Region or state: Ica Region
- Main ingredients: Manjar blanco, dried fruits or nuts
- Variations: Chocotejas

A teja (Spanish pronunciation: [ˈtexa]) is a dumpling-shaped confection from the Ica Region of Peru. It contains manjar blanco filling (similar to dulce de leche) and either dried fruits or nuts. The exterior is usually a sugar-based fondant-like shell, but there also exist chocolate versions too (known by the blend chocotejas).
