= Manjar blanco =

Term used in Spanish-speaking areas for milk-based sweets

Manjar blanco (Spanish) Menjablanc (Catalan)
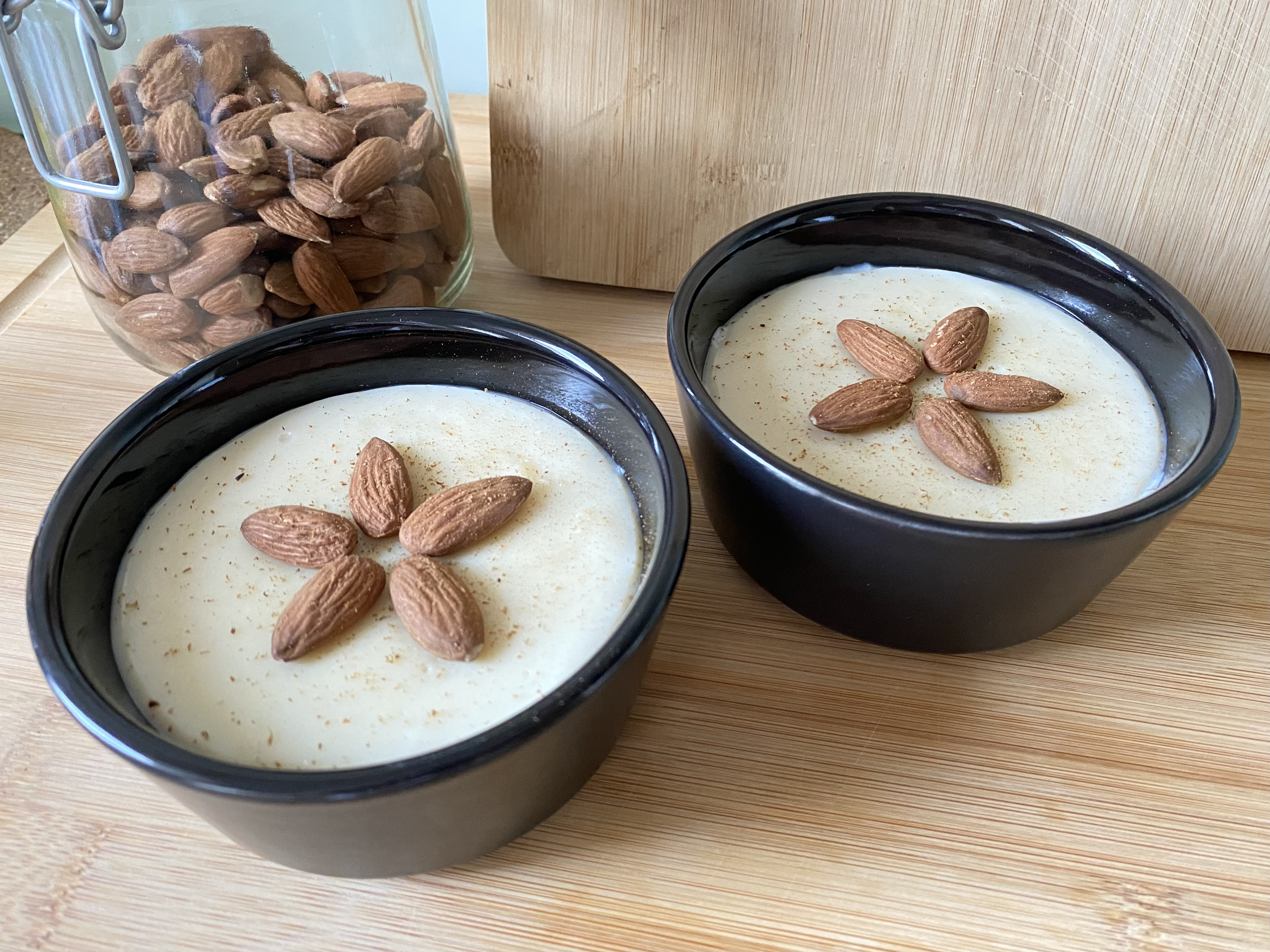
- Typical Catalan menjablanc from Reus
- Alternative names: Manjar de leche, manjar (Spanish); Menjar blanc (Catalan)
- Type: Dessert
- Region or state: Europe, Americas and Maritime Southeast Asia
- Main ingredients: Milk

Manjar blanco (Spanish pronunciation: [maŋˈxaɾ ˈblaŋko], also known in Spanish as manjar de leche), known in Catalan as menjar blanc or menjablanc, is a term used in Spanish- and Catalan-speaking areas of the world in reference to a variety of milk-based sweets. It refers to variations of blancmange, a European sweet found in various parts of the continent as well as the United Kingdom.

In the Americas (South America primarily) it refers to a sweet, white spread or pastry filling made with milk. This term is sometimes used interchangeably with dulce de leche or cajeta in Latin America but these terms generally refer to sweets prepared differently from those just described. Related dishes exist by other names in other regions, such as tembleque in Puerto Rico. In Portuguese-speaking countries, the dish is slightly different and known as manjar branco.

== In different regions ==
=== Spain and the Catalan-speaking areas ===
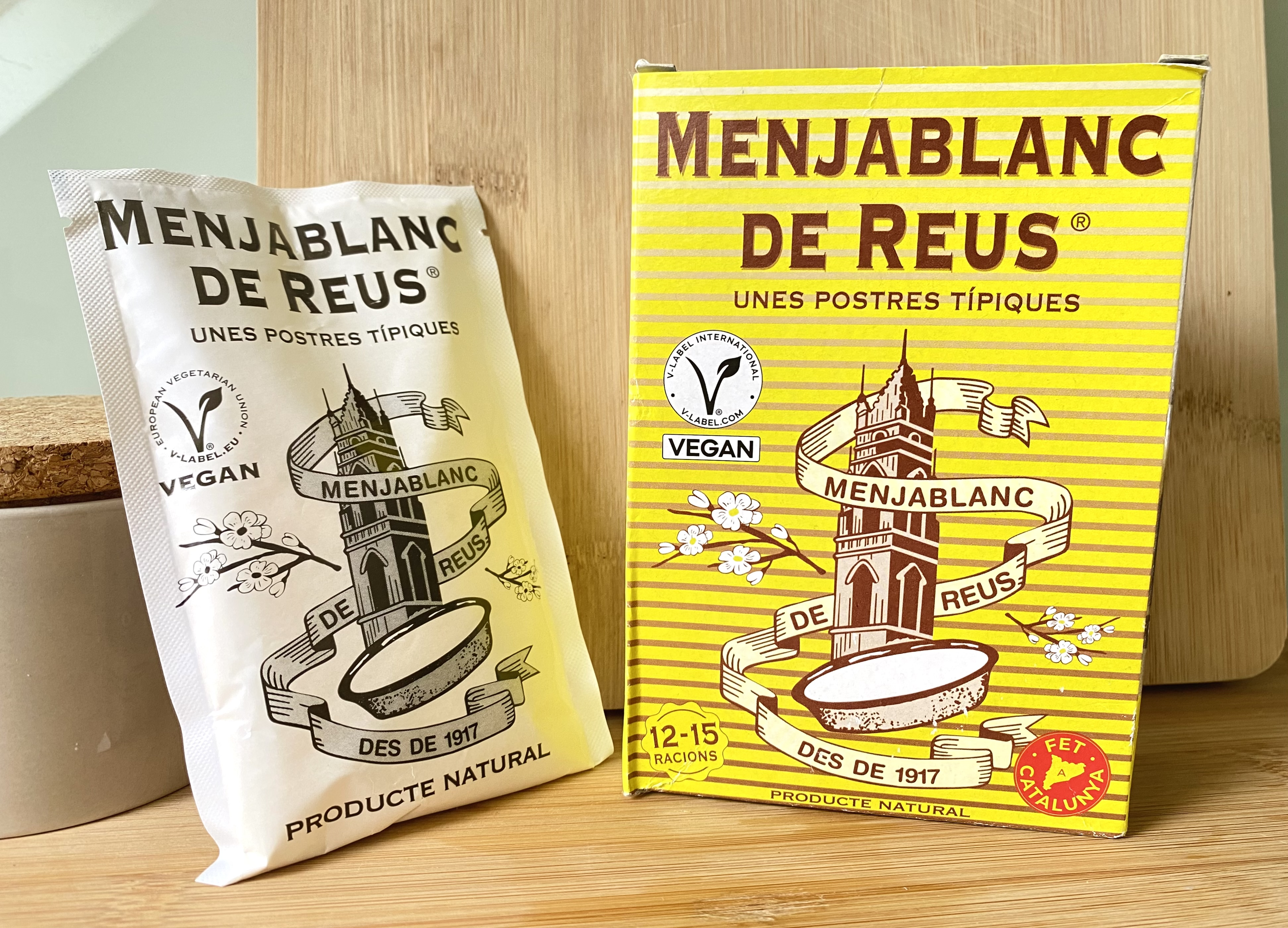
Powder commercially available menjablanc from Reus, considered a local speciality

Manjar blanco in Spain and in other parts of Europe refers to a dessert (blancmange in English), traditionally light brown in color (although often colored by added ingredients), made in a mould with a consistency like gelatin (in fact modern varieties are often made with gelatin). In the Middle Ages, the dish was prepared with chicken or fish, rice, sugar, and almond milk or milk and other ingredients (the dish was probably influenced by the Arab cuisine of Muslim Spain). Today the primary ingredients in Spain tend to be milk, almonds, corn starch or gelatin, and sugar.

In the Catalan Countries, the recipe dates back to the Middle Ages and it is present in cookbooks as old as the Llibre de Sent Soví (1324), one of the oldest in Europe that was not published in Latin. One of the most famous variations of the menjar blanc in this area is the one from Reus, produced since the 1910s and considered a historical local delicacy based on the almond as its key ingredient. It has no gelatin in its recipe. Another famous variation is the one from l'Alguer (Sardinia), that was exported from Reus and that later on evolved without any almond—only containing milk, starch, sugar, and lemon peel.

=== South America ===
This term is used in Peru, Ecuador, Chile, and Bolivia (not to be confused with natillas which is a similar but separate dish). It refers to a set of similar dishes traditionally made by slowly and gently cooking pure (normally non-homogenized) milk to thicken and reduce the volume, and gradually adding sugar. In some regions other ingredients such as vanilla, citrus juices, cinnamon, and even rice may also be added. Usually a double boiler of some sort is employed so as to prevent browning of the mixture (which would give it a different flavor). The result is a white or cream-colored, thick spread with a consistency much like that of a thick cake frosting although the flavor is more like that of sweetened cream (with accents of whatever additional ingredients may have been added). The cooking process is largely the same as for creating sweetened condensed milk except that the result is normally thicker.

Although manjar blanco can be used as spread much like jelly or jam is used in the U.S., it is also commonly used as a filling for pastries and cookies such as alfajores and tejas.

=== Colombia ===
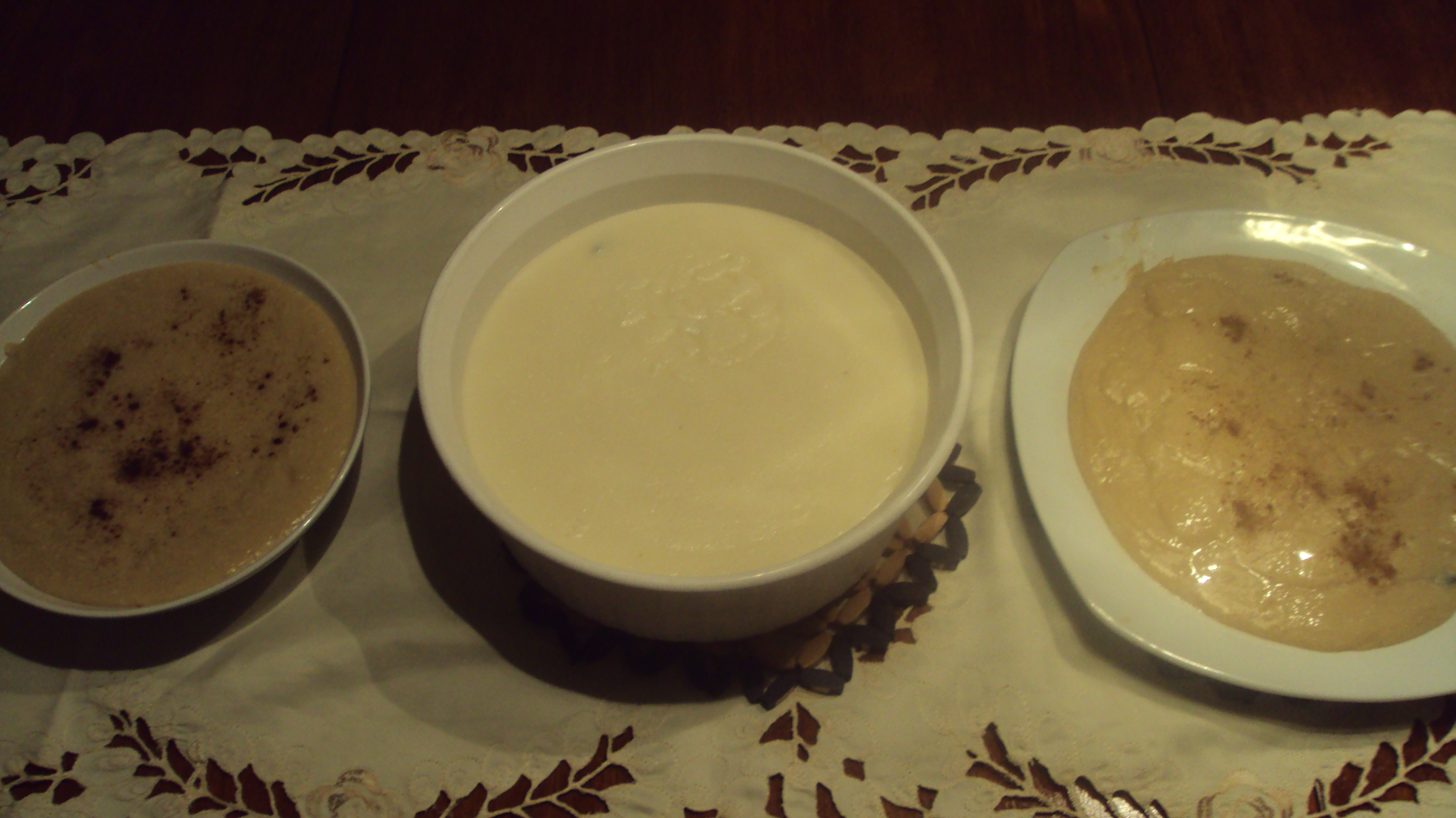
Colombian manjar blanco (center bowl)

Manjar blanco is a traditional Christmas dish in Colombia, along with natilla. It is made of ingredients like milk, rice, and sugar, which are heated for a long period of time until the right texture is achieved. Manjar blanco is usually eaten with a slice of natilla, buñuelos, and hojuelas, creating a flavor combination of the salty buñuelos with the two sweet desserts. Manjar blanco can be found in stores during Christmas time, but is also found in stores throughout the year.

=== Central America ===
In Guatemala, El Salvador, and other countries in Central America manjar de leche is a pudding or custard made with milk, cornstarch (to thicken), sugar, and often other ingredients such as vanilla, cinnamon or other flavorings. This white-colored confection may be eaten by itself or used as a pastry filling. In Costa Rica, the term "natilla" refers to a cultured buttermilk-like product with a butterfat content ranging from 12% ("liviana") to 14%, sold in stores in plastic pouches. It is used as a condiment on such dishes as gallo pinto, baked potatoes, steamed vegetables and the like.

=== Philippines ===
Manjar blanco is known as tibuktíbuk in Pampangan and tibok-tibok in Tagalog. There also exists an indigenized, plant-based adaptation of this dessert called maja blanca which instead uses coconut milk, alongside cornstarch or gulaman (algae-derived thickener) and sugar. It also commonly includes corn kernels, and this variation is known as maja blanca con maíz.

== See also ==
- Buñuelos
- Hojuelas
- List of spreads
