= Khanom thuai =

Traditional Thai dessert

Khanom thuai, Khanom thuai talai
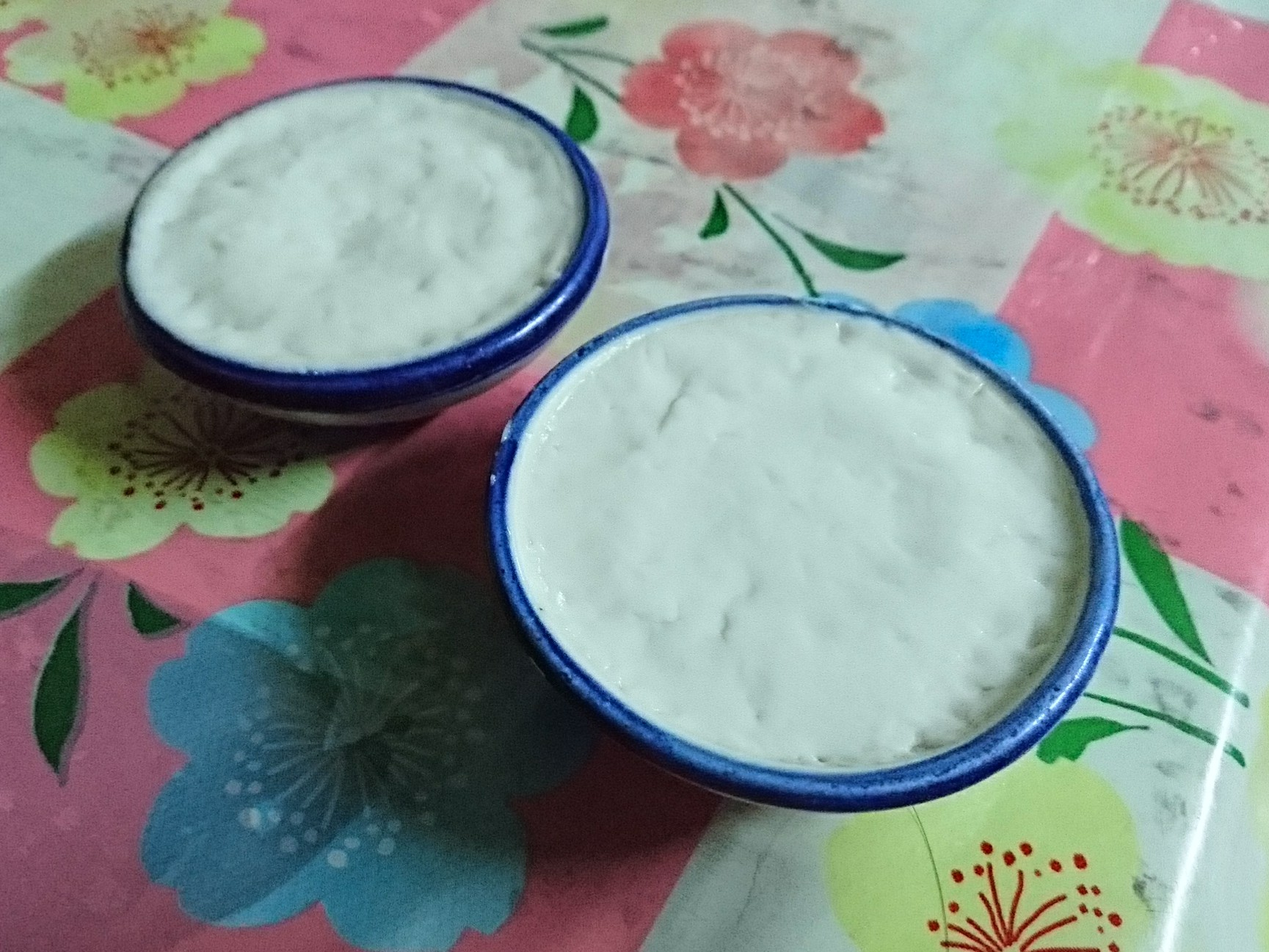
- Type: Dessert
- Place of origin: Thailand
- Main ingredients: Rice flour, coconut milk, sugar

Khanom thuai talai (Thai: ขนมถ้วยตะไล, Thai pronunciation: [kʰā.nǒm tʰûaj tā.lāj]), usually shortened to khanom thuai (ขนมถ้วย), is a Thai dessert made from rice flour, coconut milk and sugar. Its name is derived from the small ceramic cups in which the dessert is cooked and distinctively served, which are called thuai talai ("talai" bowls). Ingredients may also include salt, eggs and pandan essence.

Khanom thuai has a sweet taste in contrast with a salty taste. There are two parts of the Khanom thuai, the "body" and the "face". The body is at the bottom with the face resting on it. In the past, the body section will have a light brown color from coconut sugar. However, nowadays, people are applying a variety of ingredients to change different aspects of the dessert (taste and looks). For example, by applying pandan leaf, the body will change color to white, and by applying butterfly pea, the body will change color to light blue.

In Thailand, Khanom thuai is well known across the country and is commonly eaten alongside boat noodles and sold at street shops. Bangkok neighborhoods that are notable for serving Khanom thuai include Talad Nang Loeng (ตลาดนางเลิ้ง, Nang Loeng market) in Pom Prap Sattru Phai.

== History ==
In the past, Khanom Thuai was generally made only for important cultural dates and festivals, such as weddings, ordinations, and events similar to Songkran day. This is due to the number of recourse both manpower and ingredients that are required are quite high. In addition, the recipe for making this delicacy changes drastically over time, and for the dessert to be more suitable for different purposes, for example, Khanom Thuai which is given to the monks as an offering has a different recipe than normal ones, in this case, the recipe was adjusted so that it is more difficult to becomes doughy.

== Modern versions ==
There are many variation of Khanom Thuai at the present date. Adding different colors and other ingredients, such as pandan leaf or young coconut, is a popular act that is commonly done in stores across Bangkok. Price of Khanom Thuai depending on where you buy it. It can vary from 2 or 5 bath per piece up to 10 bath.

== See also ==
- Coconut pudding
- List of Thai desserts
- Serabi
