= Coconut bar =

Chilled, gelatinous dessert made from coconut milk

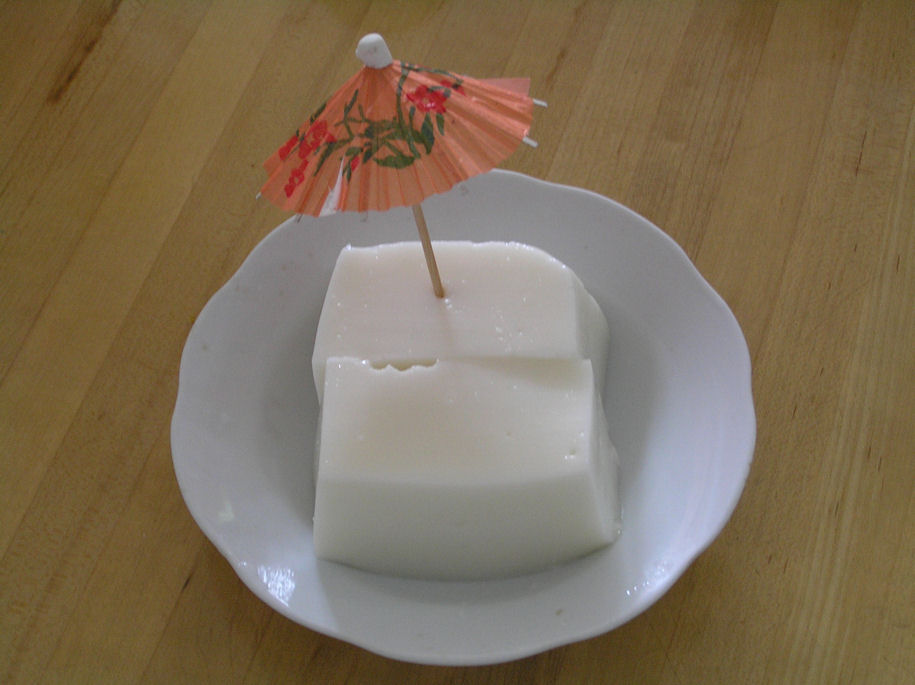
- Alternative names: Coconut pudding
- Type: Pastry
- Place of origin: China
- Main ingredients: Coconut milk; wheat starch and corn starch, or agar and gelatin

Coconut bar
- Chinese: 椰汁糕
Transcriptions
Standard Mandarin
- Hanyu Pinyin: yēzhīgāo
- Bopomofo: ㄧㄜ ㄓ ㄍㄠ
- Wade–Giles: yeh^{1}-chih^{1}-kao^{1}
- IPA: [jé.ʈʂɨ́.káʊ]
Yue: Cantonese
- Yale Romanization: yèhjāpgōu
- Jyutping: je4 zap1 gou1
- IPA: [jɛ˩.tsɐp̚˥.kɔw˥]

Coconut bar is a refrigerated dim sum dessert found in Hong Kong, Taiwan, Southern China and in overseas Chinatowns. It is sweet and has a soft, gelatin-like texture but is white in color rather than translucent like gelatin. It is sometimes referred to as coconut pudding.

== Preparation ==
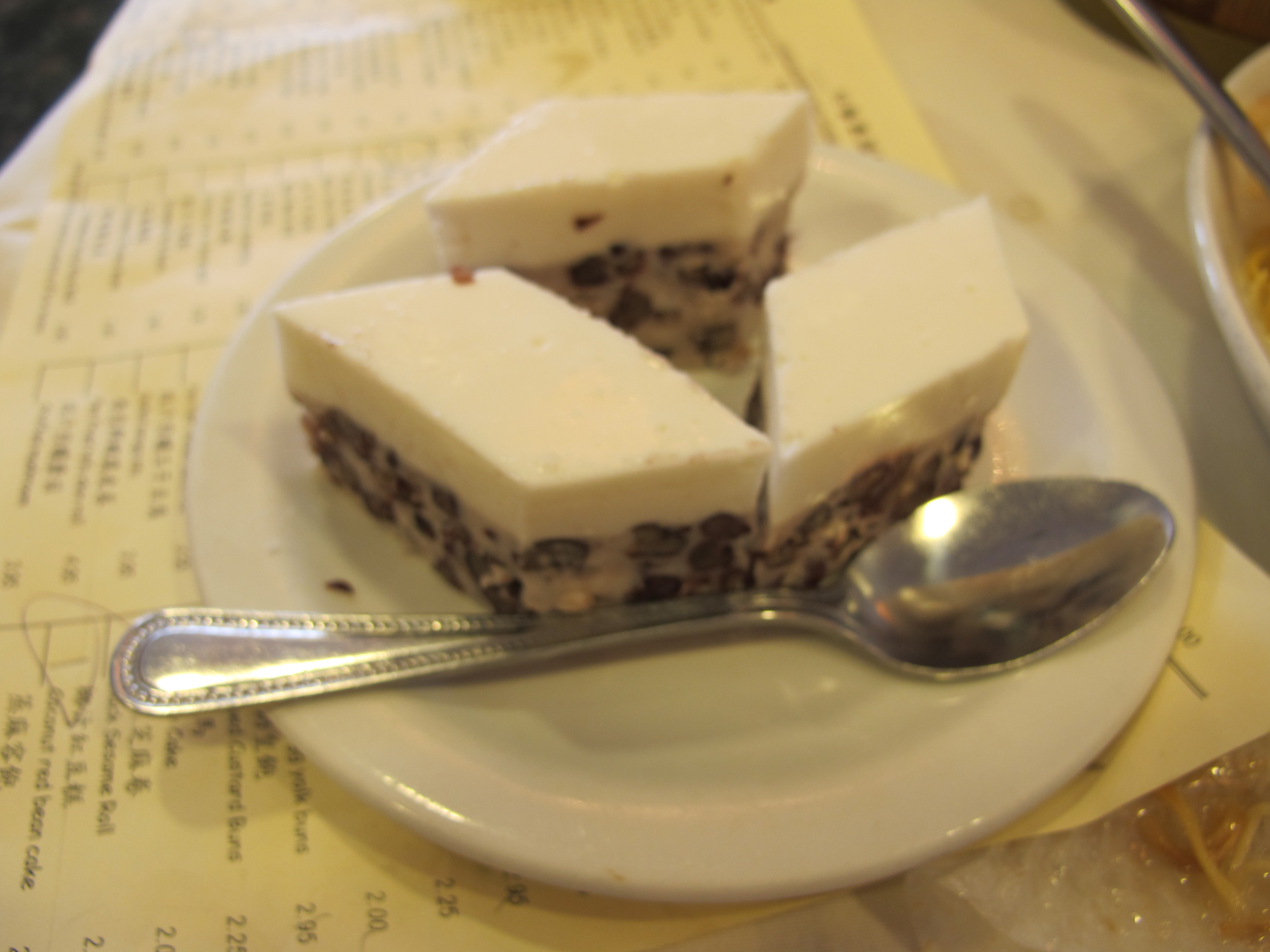
With azuki beans

The dessert is made of coconut milk (preferably freshly made) and set with a mixture of tang flour (wheat starch) and corn starch, or a mixture of agar agar and gelatin. It is sweetened, and sometimes sprinkled with desiccated coconuts. The texture varies from silky springy (if gelatin and agar agar is used as setting agent) to creamy in texture (if wheat starch and corn starch are used to set the dessert) depending on individual preparations. The standard dim sum version has no filling.

== See also ==
- Haupia
- Jell-O
- Maja blanca
- Mango pudding
- Tembleque
- List of Chinese desserts
- List of desserts
