= Natillas =

Spanish custard dish of milk and eggs, variety of custards

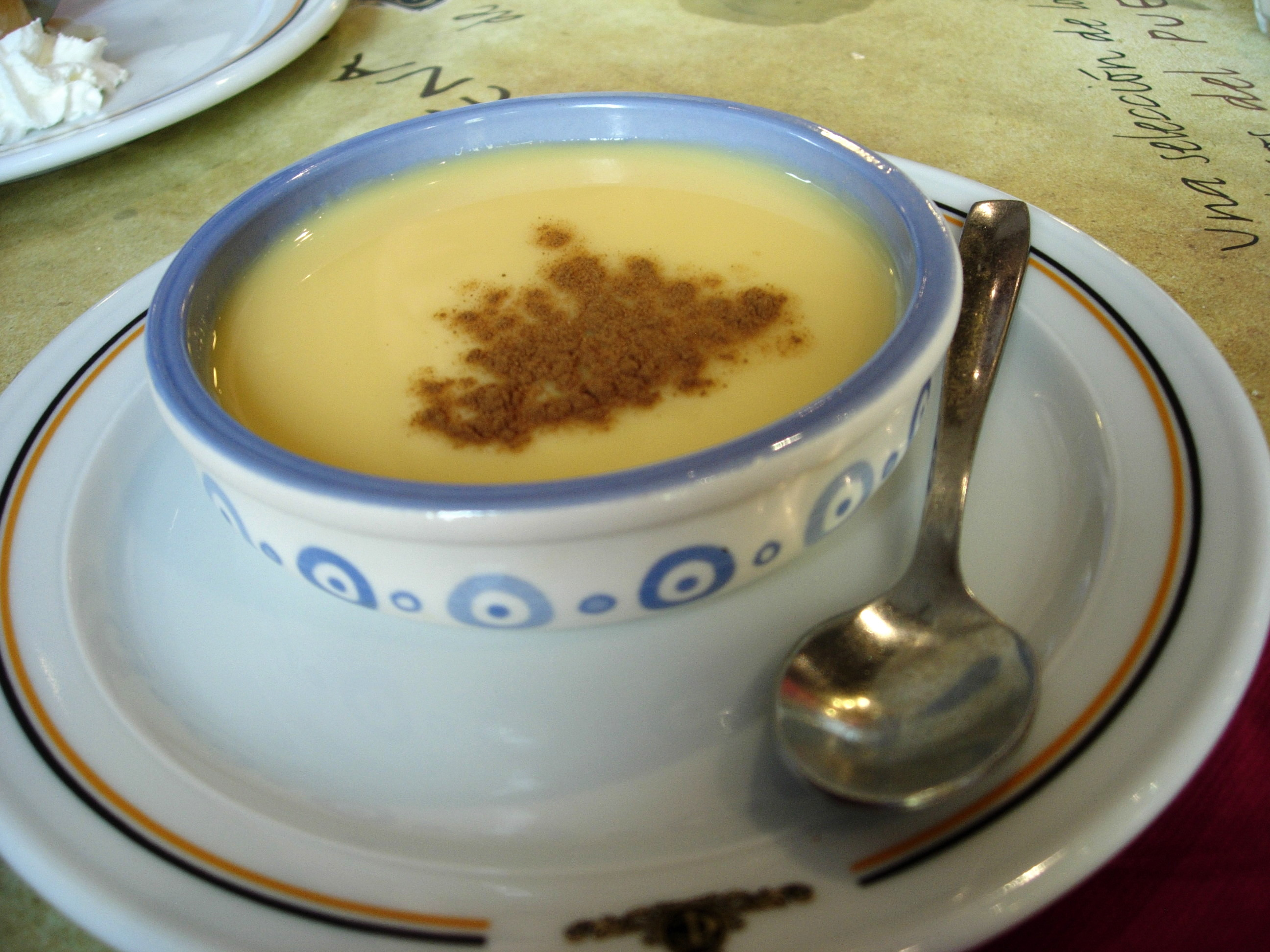
- A bowl of natillas from Madrid
- Place of origin: Spain
- Main ingredients: milk and eggs

Natillas (Spanish pronunciation: [naˈtiʎas]) is a term in Spanish for a variety of custards and similar sweet desserts in the Spanish-speaking world. In Spain, this term refers to a custard dish made with milk and eggs, similar to other European creams as crème anglaise. In Colombia, the delicacy does not include eggs, and is called natilla.

== Etymology ==
Natillas is a diminutive of nata ("cream", in English), that is, crema de leche (milk cream), referring to the consistency of the dish.

== Varieties ==
=== Spain ===
In Spain, natillas is a custard dish typically made with milk, sugar, vanilla, eggs, and cinnamon. The dish is prepared by gently boiling the milk and slowly stirring in the eggs (often just the yolks) and other ingredients to create a sweet custard. It is often served with a María biscuit on top.

This custard (a thin pouring cream and not a coagulated custard) is similar to flan but is typically richer, includes cinnamon, and does not include caramel. The differences between Spanish natillas, English custard or French crème anglaise are vague, mainly related to their thickness.

=== New Mexico ===
New Mexican natillas are derived directly from the recipes of Spain as a result of the Spanish Conquest and the existing Spanish descendants. Such natillas are custard-like in consistency and may, in some recipes, have flour in addition to egg whites. They are not to be confused with Mexican natillas.

=== Colombia ===
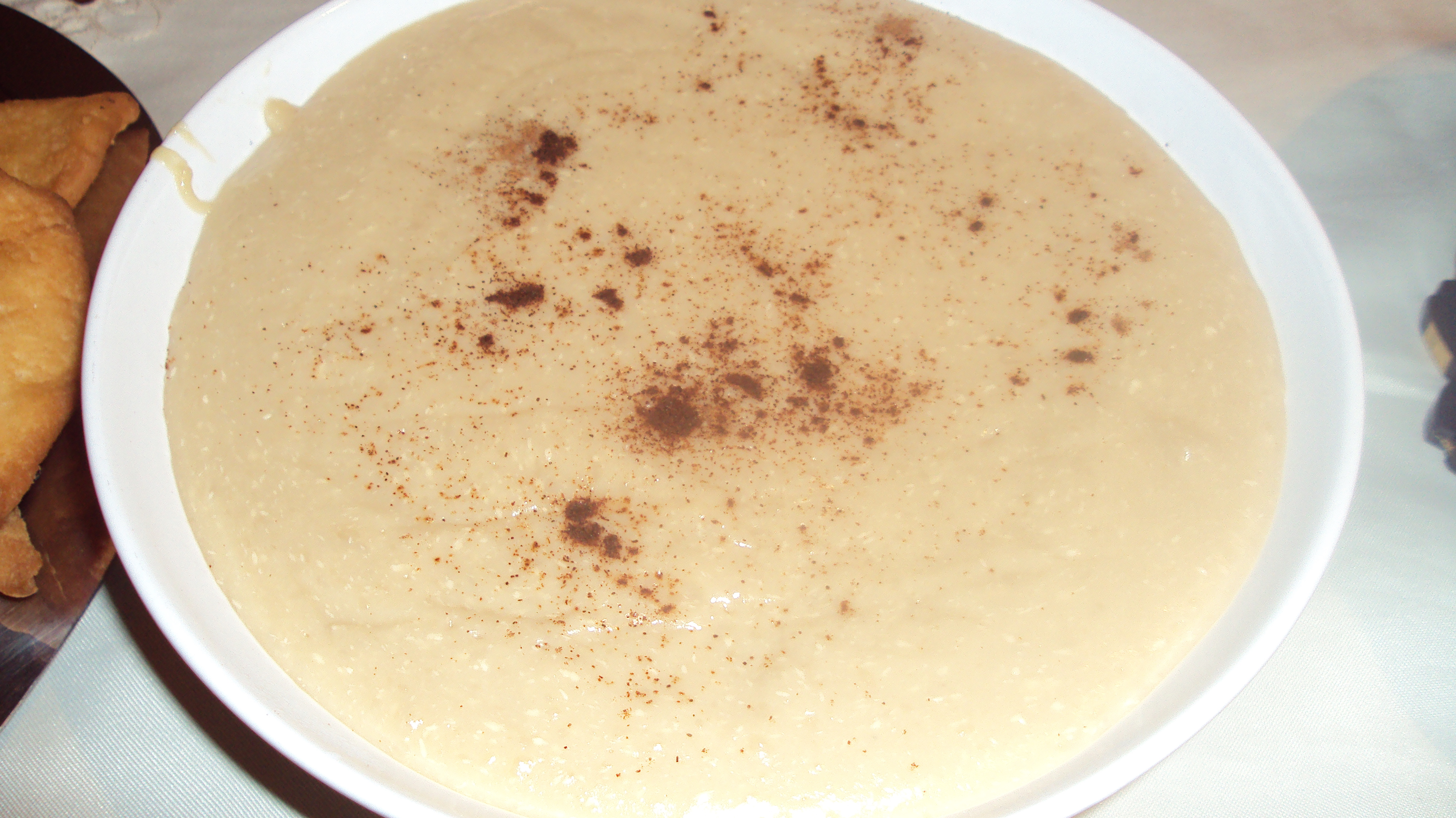
Plate of Colombian natilla

In Colombia, natilla is the most popular Christmas dish and is eaten along with buñuelos and manjar blanco, and it resembles a flan or pudding. Some of the ingredients include milk, panela (blocks of unrefined cane sugar), cinnamon sticks, and flour or cornstarch. Occasionally people like to add grated coconut, cheese or raisins but these are optional ingredients. To garnish it, powdered cinnamon is spread on top of the finished natilla. Natilla is found all throughout the Christmas season and usually stores sell pre-made natilla, with a variety of flavors including coconut, and arequipe; but one of the best known Christmas traditions in Colombia is making natilla in an improvised campfire in the streets or home patios. Another traditional way of making it includes adding aguardiente or anisette (anise liqueur) to it.

=== Peru ===
This term is used in Peru, especially the city of Piura, a spread made of milk and chancaca that is boiled until it is thick and the sugar has caramelized to a rich brown color. The Peruvian confection is arguably more similar to Spanish natillas except that it is somewhat thicker and has no eggs.

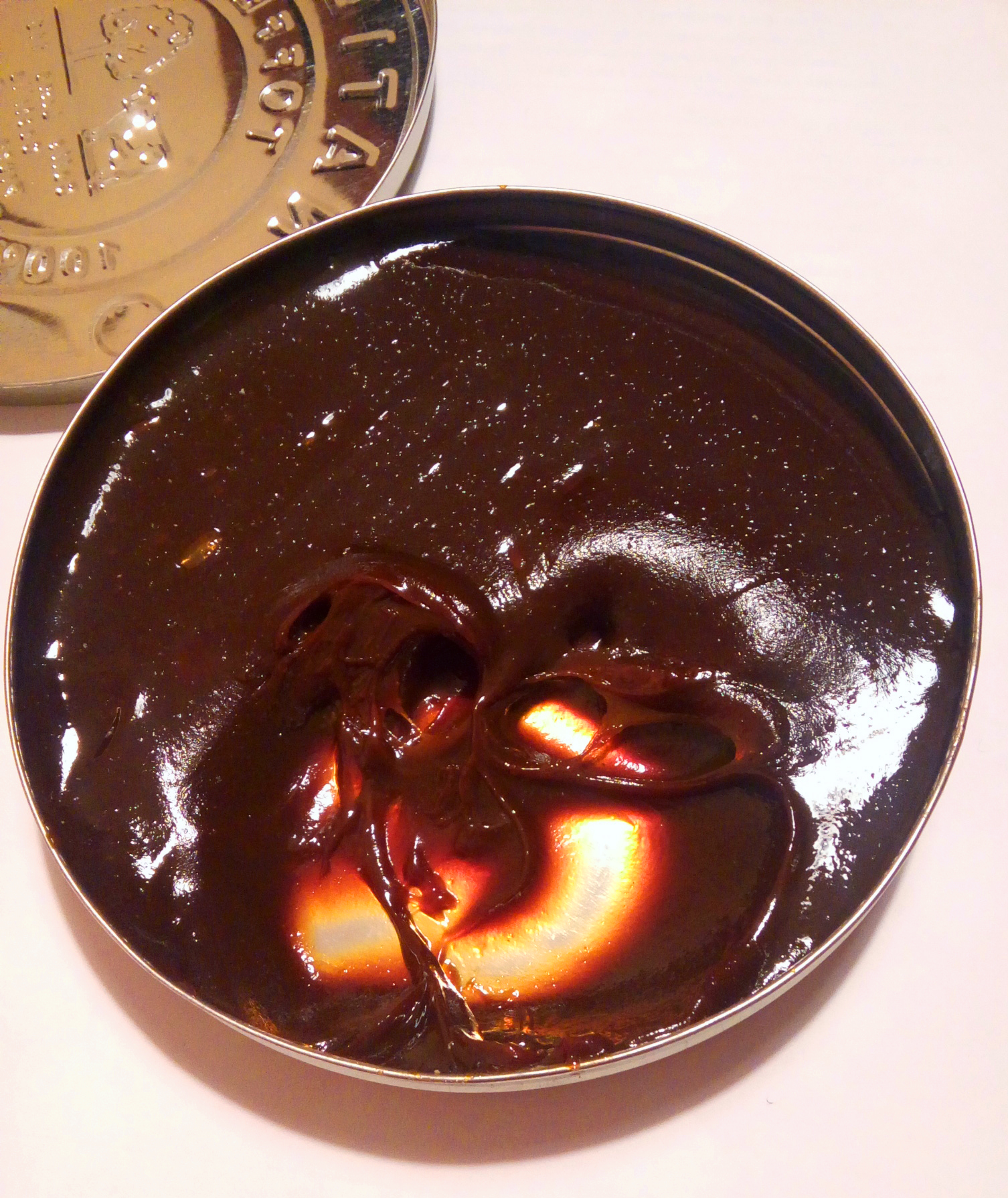
Natillas from Peru

=== Mexico ===
In Mexico, Natillas are also found and resemble a thicker version of the dessert drink called "Atole."

=== Costa Rica ===
In Costa Rica, the term is used for a sour cream-like dairy product used as a condiment with a variety of dishes. The product is homogenized and pasteurized milk with a lower fat content (about 12%) than normal sour cream, some brands add salt to the cream.

=== Cuba ===
Natilla in Cuba is classified as a cold custard dessert. Natilla is made with cornstarch, vanilla, sugar, eggs, lemon peel, cinnamon, and evaporated milk. Typically served on Christmas in small cups with cinnamon sprinkled on top.

=== Puerto Rico ===
There are two versions of this dessert that exist on the island.

One version is served for breakfast and cooked stove top in a pot. Served cold or hot, has less or no sugar because it is often served with honey, fruit and nuts.

Another version using the same ingredients is served on Christmas and baked in same fashion as crème brûlée.

Both versions include, milk, coconut cream, sugar, a large amount of egg yolks, cornstarch, cinnamon, vanilla, zest, and orange blossom water.

Puerto Rican Natilla can be bought all year around in supermarkets and convenience stores as a prepackaged powder with just the requirement of heating with milk.

=== Guam ===
In Guam, the dish is often called latiya and was likely first introduced in the 17th to 19th centuries. It is often made with canned evaporated or condensed milk.

== See also ==
- Buñuelos
- Flan
- Hojuelas
- List of custard desserts
- Manjar blanco
