= Blancmange =

Dessert of milk or cream and sugar, thickened and flavoured

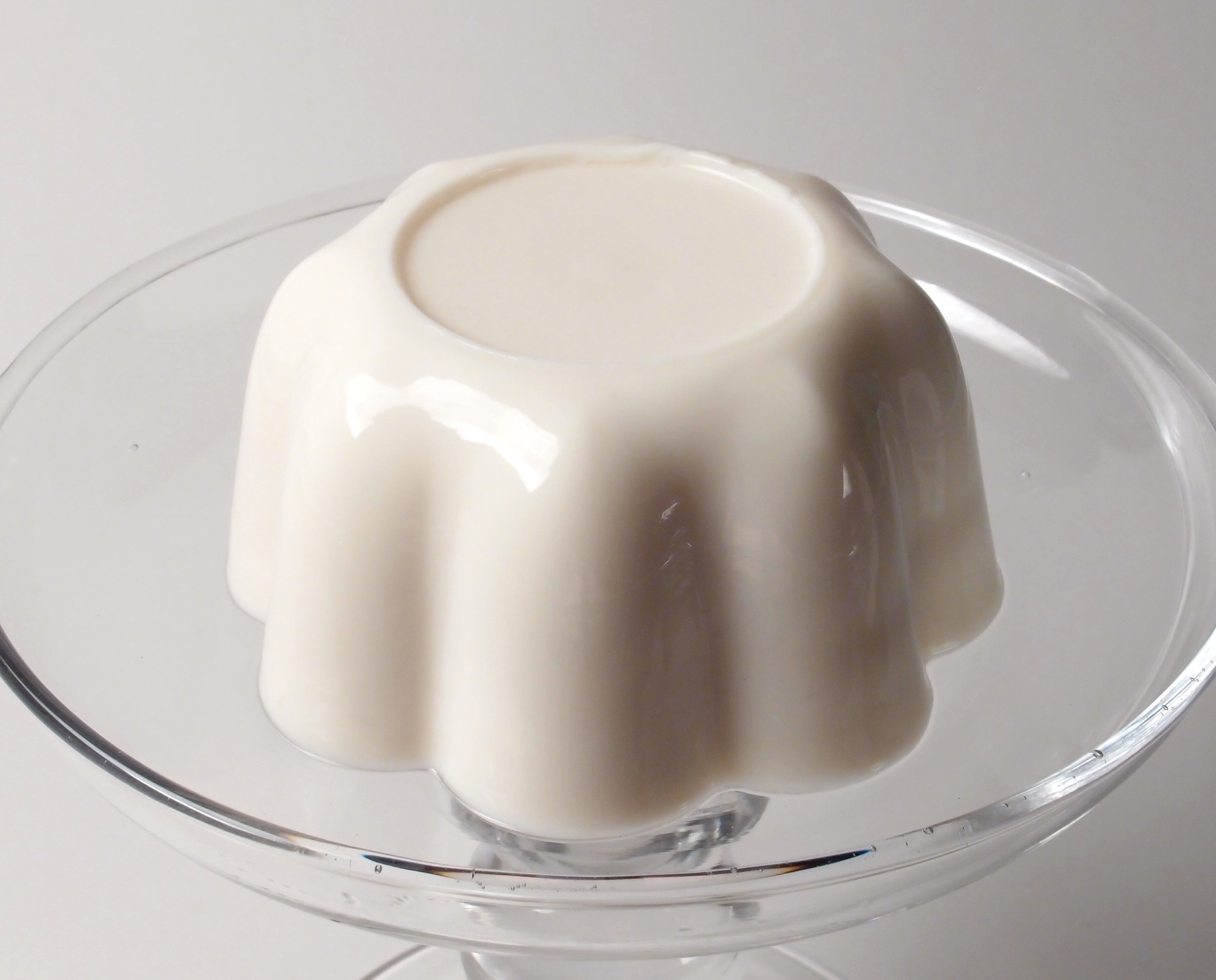
- A blancmange set on a glass platter
- Course: Dessert
- Serving temperature: Cold
- Main ingredients: Milk or cream; sugar; gelatin, cornstarch or Irish moss; almonds

Blancmange (/bləˈmɒnʒ/, from French: blanc-manger [blɑ̃mɑ̃ʒe], lit. 'white food') is a sweet dessert made throughout Europe commonly made with milk or cream, and sugar, thickened with rice flour, gelatin or cornflour, and often flavoured with almonds.

It is usually set in a mould and served cold. Although traditionally white, blancmanges are frequently given other colours.

Blancmange originated at some time during the Middle Ages from the older Middle Eastern muhallebi, and usually consisted of capon or chicken, milk or almond milk, rice, and sugar; it was considered to be an ideal food for the sick.

Similar desserts include Bavarian cream, Italian panna cotta, Turkish tavuk göğsü, Chinese almond tofu, Hawai'ian haupia, Spanish manjar blanco, Brazilian manjar branco, Filipino maja blanca, and Puerto Rican tembleque.

== History ==
The origins of the blancmange have long been believed to lie in the introduction of rice and almonds in early medieval Europe by Arab traders. Recently, it has been shown that there have been similar Persian dishes from that period such as muhallebi. Muhallebi, or another similar dish from the medieval Islamic world, spread to Europe first as blanc-manger in France, later translated to biancomangiare in Italy and manjar blanco in Spain. Additionally, related or similar dishes have existed in other areas of Europe under other names, such as the 13th-century Danish hwit moos ("white mush"), and the Anglo-Norman blanc desirree ("white dish"); Dutch calijs (from Latin colare, "to strain") was known in English as cullis and in French as coulis, and was based on cooked and then strained poultry. The oldest recipe for blancmange is from the oldest extant Danish cookbook, written by Henrik Harpestræng, who died in 1244, which dates it to the early 13th century at the latest. The work may be a translation of a German cookbook, which is believed to have been based on a Latin or Romance vernacular manuscript from the 12th century or even earlier.

The "whitedish" (from the original Old French term blanc manger) was a dish consumed by the upper-classes and common to most of Europe during the Middle Ages and early modern period. It occurs in countless variations from recipe collections from all over Europe and was one of the few truly international dishes of medieval and early modern Europe. It is mentioned in the prologue to Geoffrey Chaucer's Canterbury Tales and in an early 15th-century cookbook written by the chefs of Richard II. The basic ingredients were milk or almond milk, sugar, and shredded chicken (usually capon) or fish, often combined with rosewater and rice flour, and mixed into a bland stew. Almond milk and fish were used as substitutes for the other animal products on fast days and Lent. It was also often flavoured with spices such as saffron or cinnamon and the chicken could be exchanged for other fowl, such as quail or partridge. Spices were often used in recipes of the later Middle Ages since they were considered prestigious.

On festive occasions and among the upper classes, whitedishes were often rendered more festive by colouring agents: the reddish-golden yellow of saffron; green with various herbs; or sandalwood for russet. In 14th-century France, parti-colouring (the use of two bright contrasting colours on the same plate) was especially popular and was described by Guillaume Tirel (also known as Taillevent), one of the primary authors of the later editions of Le Viandier. The brightly coloured whitedishes were one of the most common of the early entremets: edibles that were intended to entertain and delight through a gaudy appearance as much as through flavour.

In the 17th century (1666), the durian fruit was compared to blanc-mangé by Alexandre de Rhodes:

il est plein d'une liqueur blanche, épaisse & sucrée : elle est entierement semblable au blanc-mangé, qu'on sert aux meilleures tables de France; c'est une chose fort saine, & des plus delicates qu'on puisse manger
[It is full of a white liquor, thick and sweet, which is entirely similar to blanc-mangé, served at the best tables in France; it is a very healthy thing, and one of the most delicate things one can eat].

In the 17th century, the whitedish evolved into a meatless dessert pudding with cream and eggs, and later, gelatin. In the 19th century, arrowroot and cornflour were added, and the dish evolved into the modern blancmange.

== Etymology ==
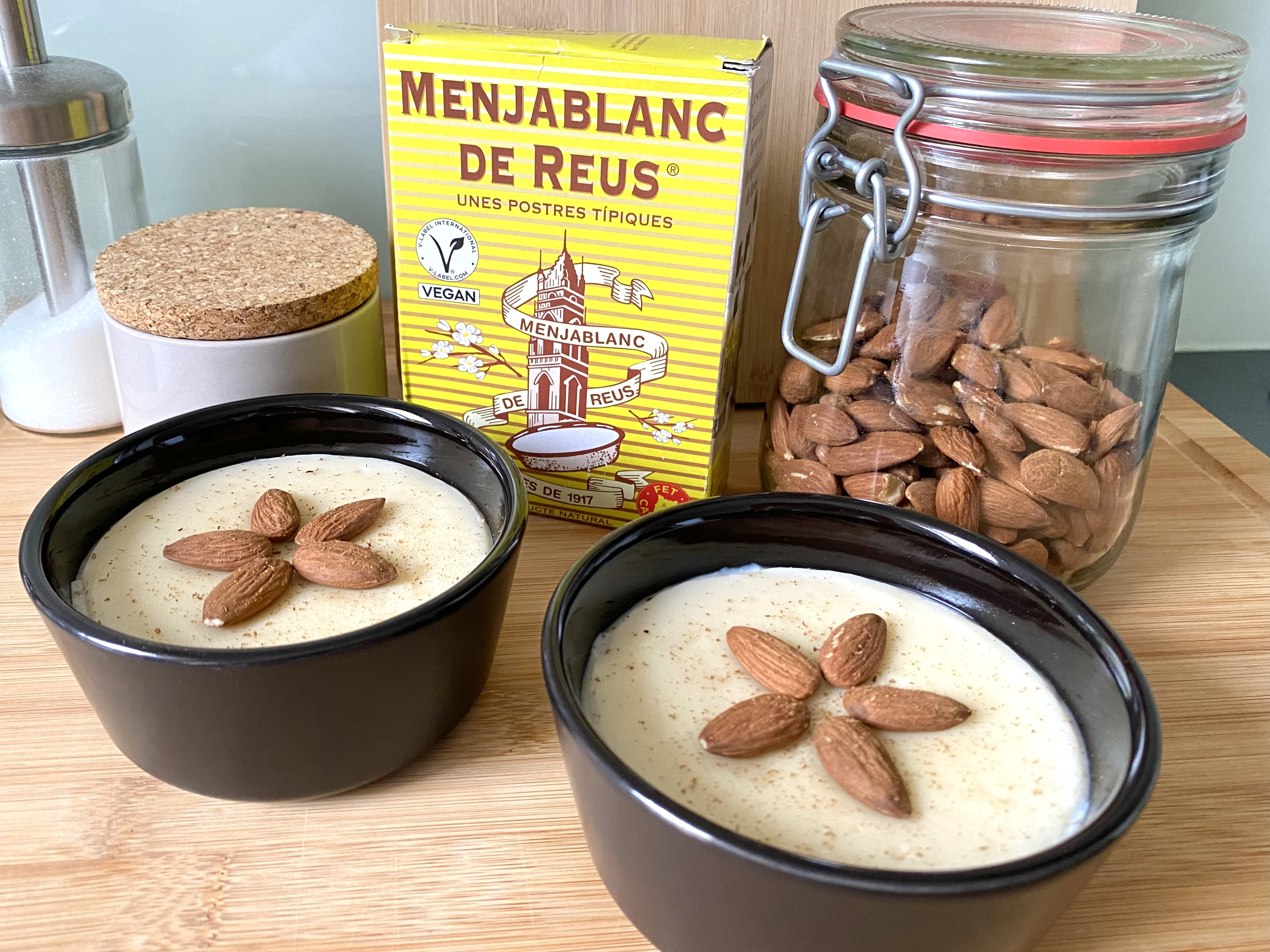
The Catalan menjar blanc, a variant of blancmange made without gelatine and mostly typical from Reus and also from l'Alguer

The word blancmange derives from Old French blanc mangier. The name "whitedish" is a modern term used by some historians, though the name historically was either a direct translation from or a calque of the Old French term. Many different local or regional terms were used for the dish in the Middle Ages as translations of the French term:

- English: blancmanger, blankmanger, blank maunger, blomanger, blamang
- Catalan: menjar blanch, menjar blanc, menjablanc
- Portuguese: manjar branco
- Italian: mangiare bianco, biancomangiare, blanmangieri, bramangere
- Spanish: manjar blanco
- Dutch/Flemish: blanc mengier
- German: Blamensir
- Latin: cibarium album

Though it is fairly certain that the etymology is indeed "white dish", medieval sources are not always consistent as to the actual colour of the dish. Food scholar Terence Scully has proposed the alternative etymology of bland mangier, "bland dish", reflecting its often mild and "dainty" (in this context meaning refined and aristocratic) taste and popularity as a dish for the sick.

== See also ==
- Almond tofu – East Asian jellied dessert made from almonds
- Blancmange curve – Fractal curve resembling a blancmange pudding
- Carrageen pudding – Milk-based dessert from Scotland and Ireland
- Custard – Semi-solid cooked mixture of milk and egg
- Flummery – Starch-based, sweet, soft dessert pudding
- Haupia – Polynesian coconut milk pudding
- Junket – Dessert made with sweetened milk and rennet
- Maja blanca – Filipino pudding of coconut milk and cornstarch
- Tavukgöğsü – Ottoman milk pudding made with chicken breast
- Medieval cuisine
- List of almond dishes
