= Manjar branco =

Brazilian coconut pudding

- Type: Pudding
- Place of origin: Brazil
- Main ingredients: Coconut

Manjar branco is a pure white Brazilian coconut pudding similar to blancmange. It is identical to the Puerto Rican tembleque. In Brazil manjar branco is made in a ring (Savarin) mold and is served with a sauce made of pitted prunes poached in port wine. Commercial mixes for manjar branco and tembleque are available in Brazil, the U.S., and in other Latin American countries.

In order to improve the texture and taste, unsweetened shredded coconut may be added to the mix.

Manjar branco in Portugal usually refers to blancmange, but the manjar branco of Coimbra is an unusual dessert made from chicken breast, milk, sugar, rice flour, orange zest, and salt.

== See also ==
- Maja blanca
- Manjar blanco
- List of Brazilian sweets and desserts
