= Sapin-sapin =

Glutinous rice and coconut dish in Filipino cuisine

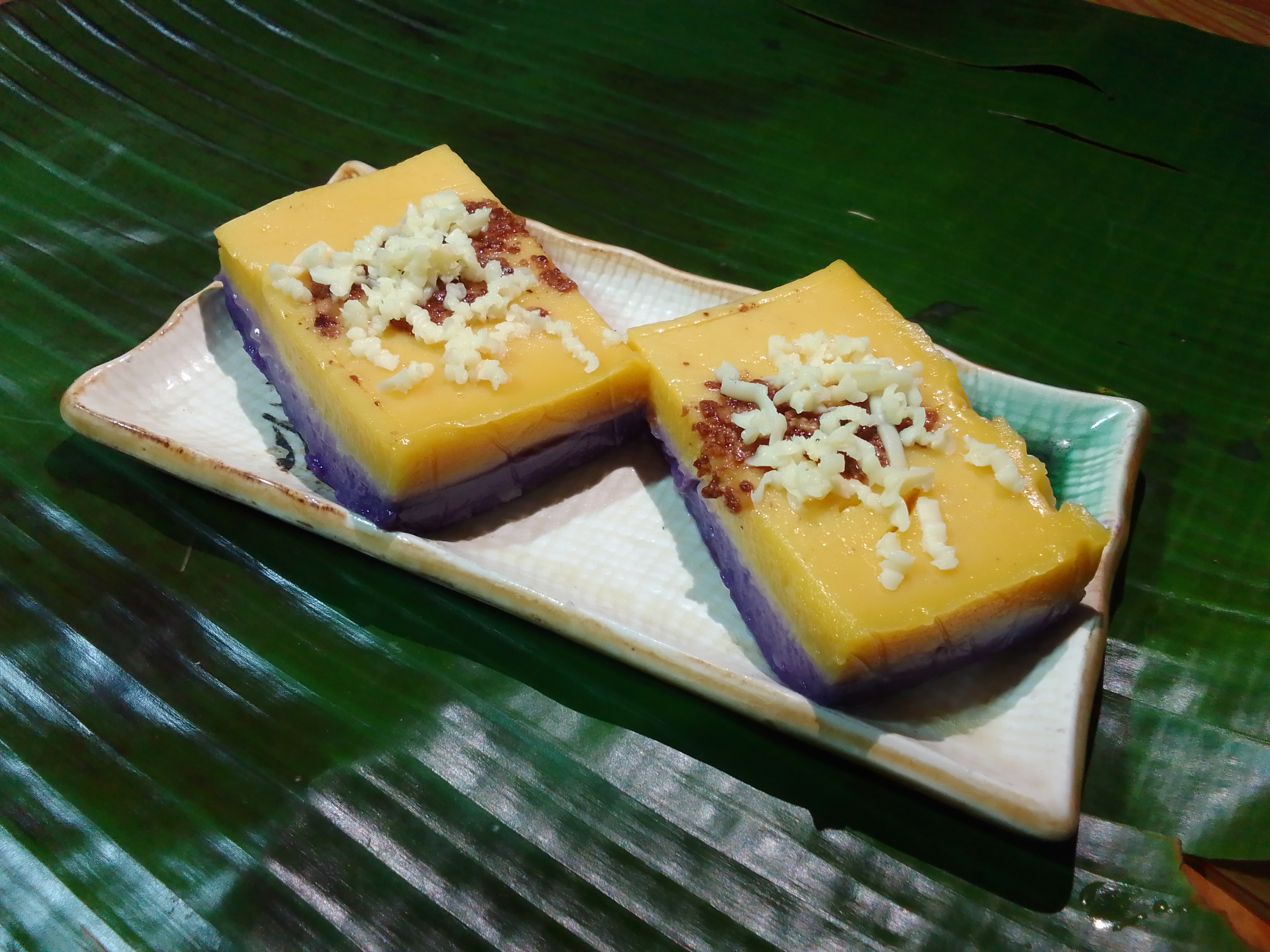
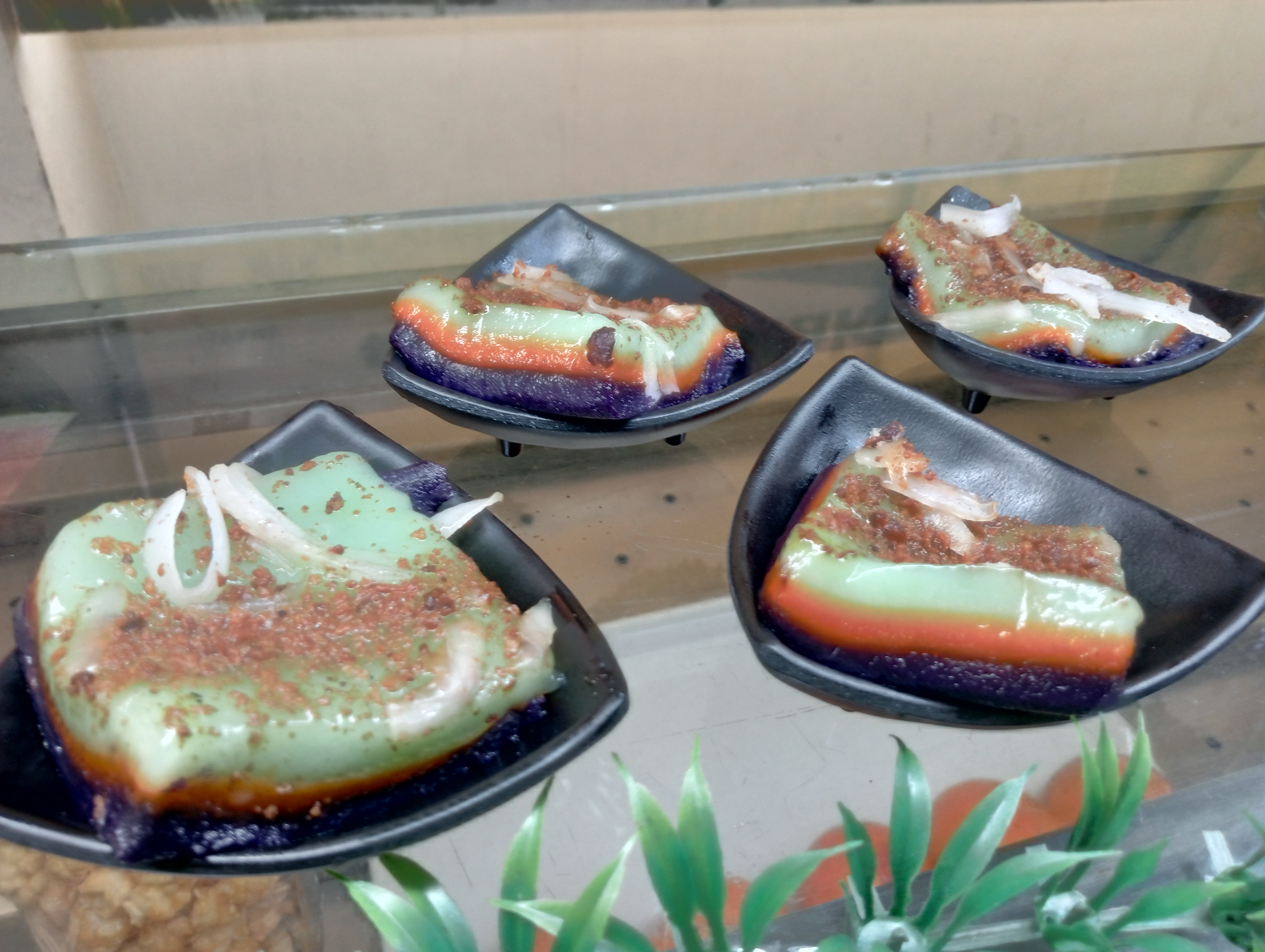
- Top: Sapin-sapin servings sprinkled with latik and grated cheese in the Philippines; Bottom: Sapin-sapin on display with latik and fresh coconut strips
- Course: Dessert or snack
- Place of origin: The Philippines
- Region or state: Luzon
- Serving temperature: Room temperature
- Main ingredients: Glutinous rice
- Food energy (per serving): 100 kcal (420 kJ)

Sapin-sapin is a layered glutinous rice and coconut dessert in Philippine cuisine. It is made from rice flour, coconut milk, sugar, water, flavoring, and coloring. It is usually sprinkled with latik or grated coconut among other toppings. The dessert is recognizable for its layers, each colored separately.

The name originates the Tagalog word sapin which means "underlayer [for cushioning]" (e.g. a blanket sheet, compare with Cebuano hapin). When reduplicated as sapin-sapin, it means "having several layers".

== See also ==
- Kue lapis
- Khanom chan
- Maja blanca
