= Latik =

Filipino dessert garnishing and condiment

Latík
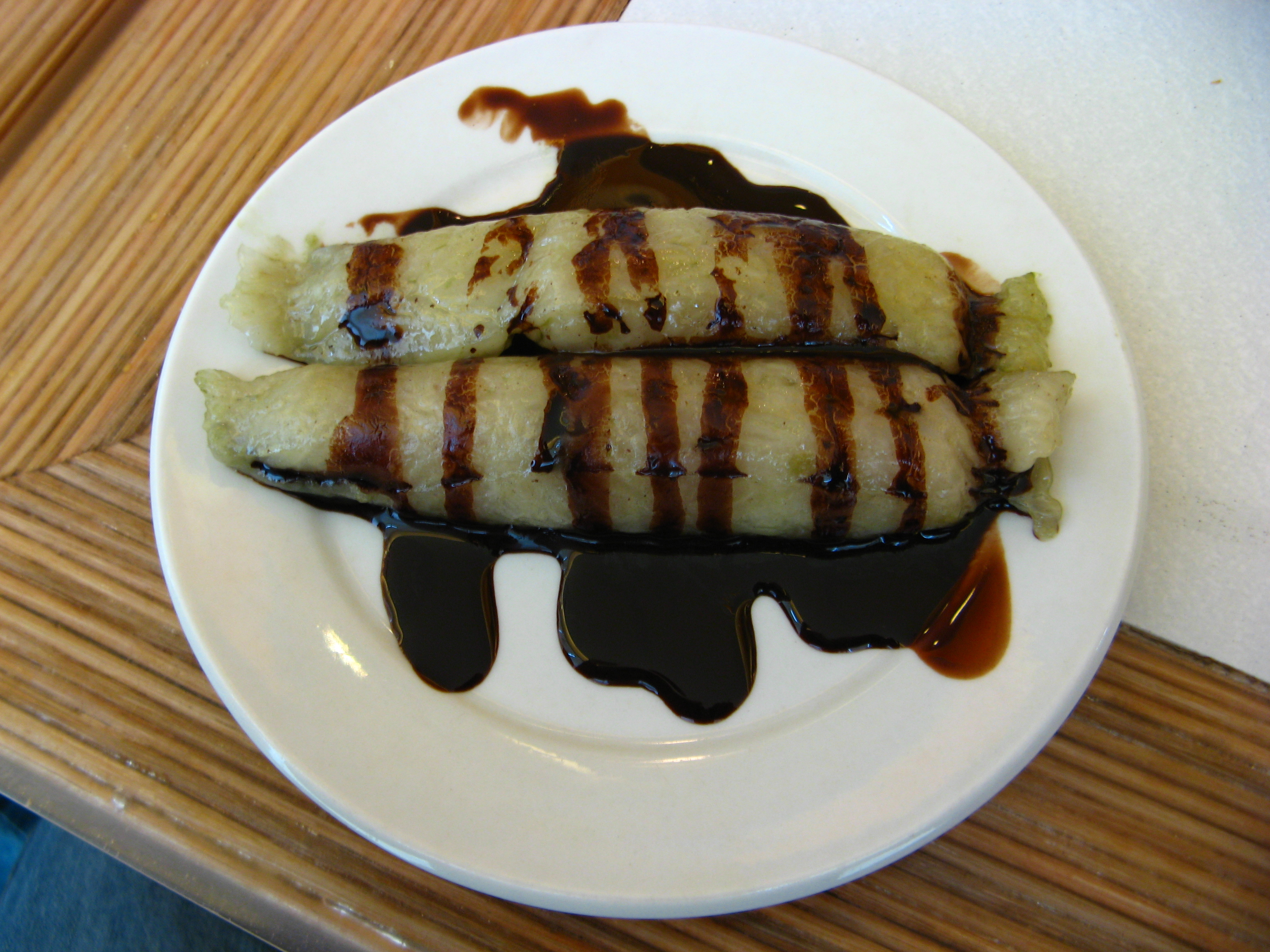
- Cassava suman smothered in latík syrup
- Type: Dessert topping
- Place of origin: The Philippines

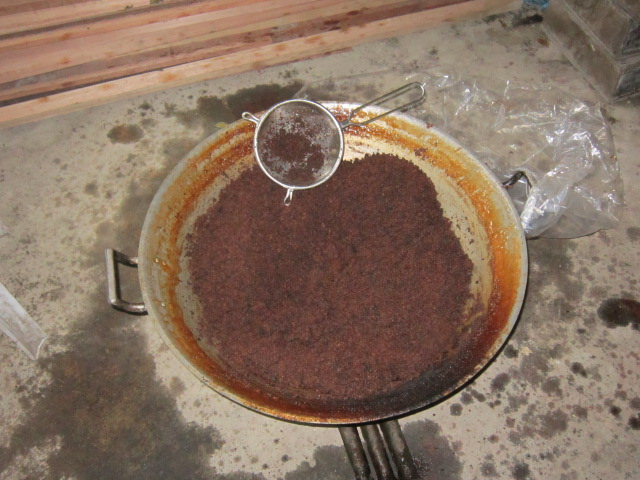
Roasted latík (made from pure coconut milk extracted from fresh mature grated coconut meat), a by-product of coconut oil production in the Philippines

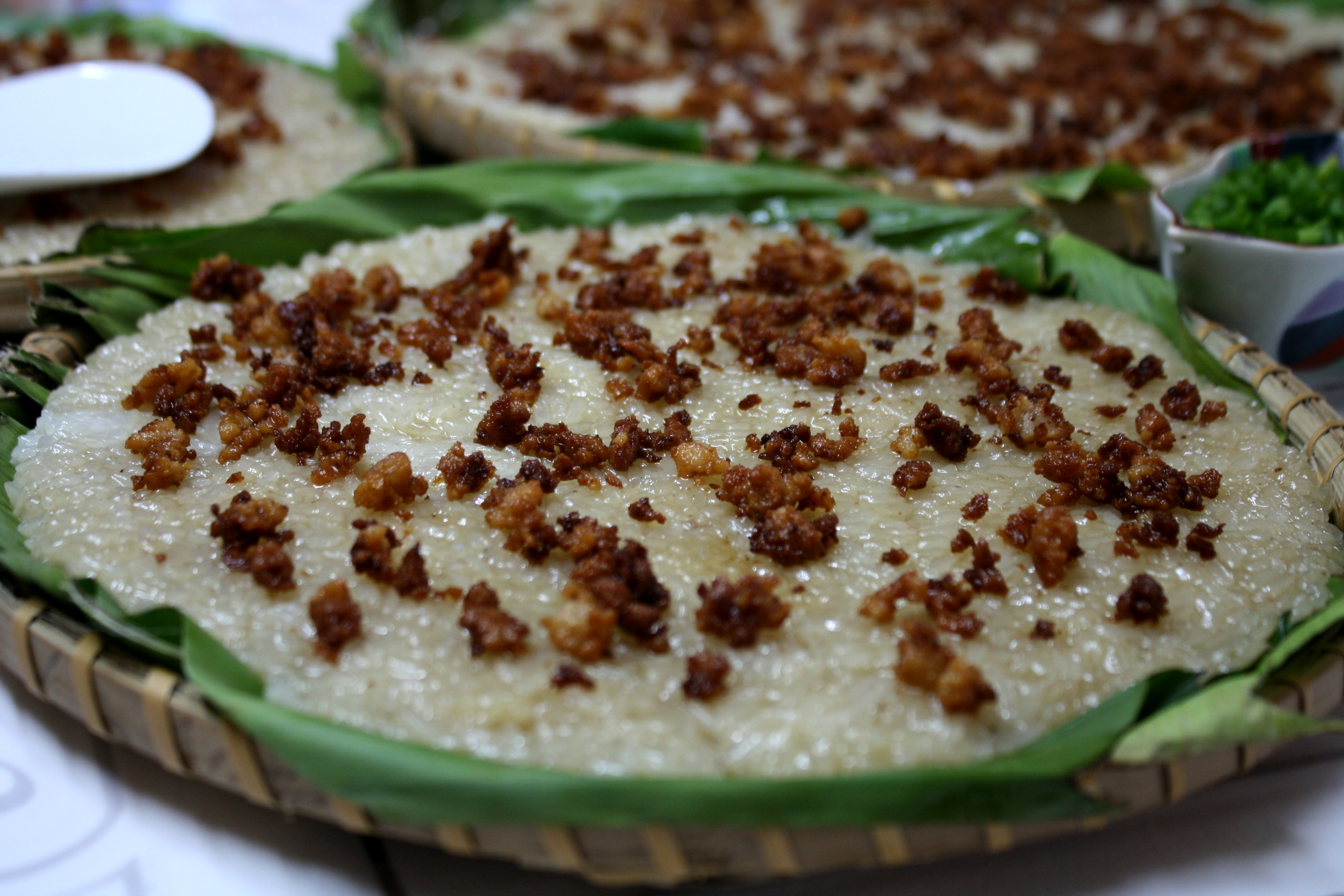
Sinukmani topped with latik coconut curds

Latík (Tagalog: [laˈtɪk]) refers to two different coconut-based ingredients in Filipino cuisine. In the Visayan region it refers to a syrupy caramelized coconut cream (coconut caramel) used as a dessert sauce. In the northern Philippines, it refers to solid by-products of coconut oil production (coconut curds), used as garnishing for a variety of desserts.

== Visayan Latik ==
Latík in its original sense in the Visayan languages literally means 'syrup' (equivalent to arnibal in Hiligaynon). It can refer to any type of thick sweetened liquids including jam. In the most common usage, however, latik means a syrupy condiment derived from reducing coconut milk and sugar.

It is used much in the same way as syrup, in dishes like kalamay and suman. It is usually Anglicized as "coconut caramel." A commercial version of the Visayan latik is marketed internationally as coconut syrup, although it should not be confused with coconut sugar derived from coconut sap.

== Tagalog Latík ==
Latík in Luzon is made from coconut milk simmered in a saucepan until it reduces to coconut oil and solids ("coconut curds") begin to form at the top surface. These solids are left to fry in the coconut oil until golden brown. In the Visayas, these solids are known as lunok in Cebuano; and balutai in Karay-a.

Latík is commonly used as a topping for a variety of Philippine dishes including maja blanca, sapin-sapin, and ube halaya. It is sometimes mistaken for fried, caramelized coconut flesh- another type of garnishing/dessert known as bukayo in Bisaya.

== See also ==
- Coconut jam
- Kalamay
- List of condiments
- List of dessert sauces
- List of Philippine dishes
- Maglalatik (literally "latik maker"), an indigenous Philippine dance
- Philippine condiments
