= Maja blanca =

Filipino pudding of coconut milk and cornstarch

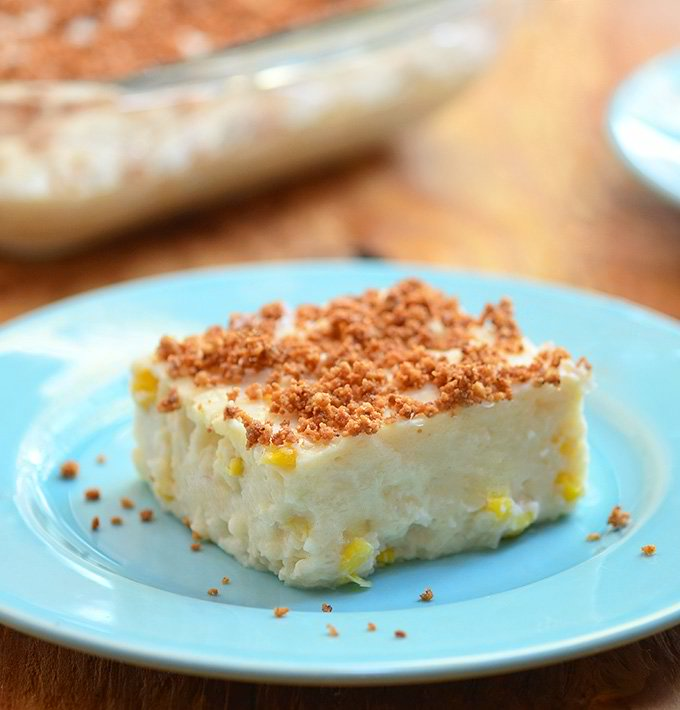
- Alternative names: Coconut pudding, Coconut cake, dudul
- Course: Dessert
- Place of origin: Philippines
- Serving temperature: Room temperature or chilled
- Main ingredients: Coconut milk, cornstarch
- Variations: Maja blanca con maiz. Maja de ube
- Similar dishes: Tibok-tibok

Maja blanca (Tagalog: [ˈmaha ˈblaŋka]) is a Filipino dessert with a gelatin-like consistency made primarily from coconut milk. Also known as coconut pudding, it is usually served during fiestas and during the holidays, especially Christmas.

== Description ==
Maja blanca has the consistency of thick gelatine and a delicate flavor, and is creamy white in color.

== Etymology and history ==
The dessert is the local Filipino adaptation of the Spanish dish manjar blanco (blancmange, literally "white delicacy"), but it has become distinct in that it uses very different ingredients, like coconut milk instead of milk or almond milk. The dish was most popular in Luzon, especially in Tagalog, Kapampangan, Pangasinense, and Ilocano cuisine. But it was also popular in the south, especially among Chavacano-speaking Zamboangueños.

Maja blanca is also known as dudul in Ilocano which reflects its Austronesian origin dodol; as well as maja blanca con maíz, maja maíz, or maja blanca maíz when corn kernels are used in the preparation (maíz is Spanish for corn).

== Preparation ==
Maja blanca is relatively easy to prepare. A coconut milk (not coconut cream) and cornstarch mixture is heated to boiling over a low flame while stirring. Agar (gulaman in Filipino) can be substituted for cornstarch. Corn kernels, milk, and sugar are also often added, though these are not traditionally part of the recipe. Once the mixture thickens, it is then poured into serving dishes previously greased with coconut oil, and allowed to cool. Once firm, latík (browned coconut cream curds) are then sprinkled as garnish.

It is also often refrigerated and served cold to improve the texture.

Maja blanca is similar in texture to panna cotta, but the flavor is different due to the coconut milk.

The corn kernels and latík add different textures to the maja blanca, which by itself is often creamy.

== Variations ==
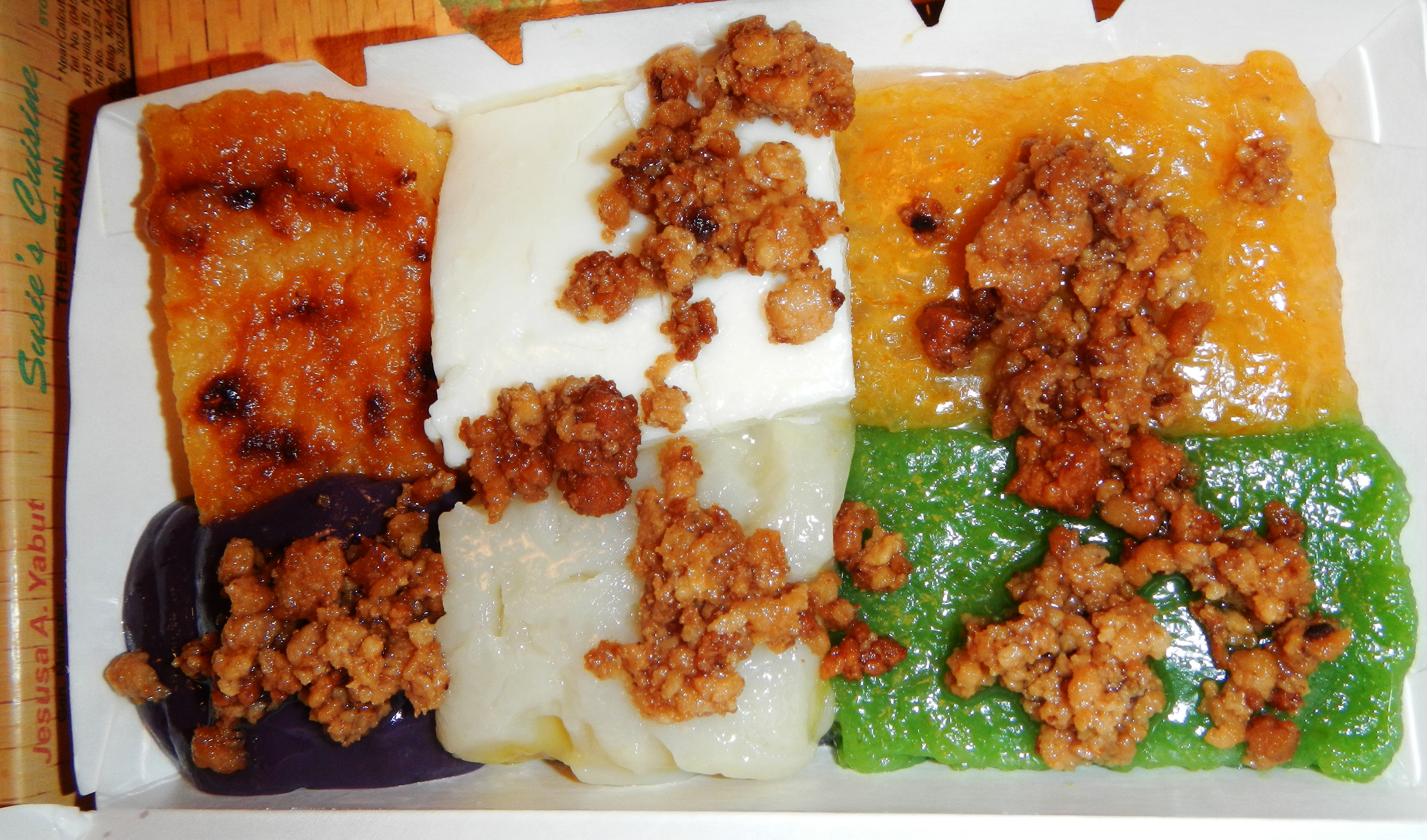
Different variants of maja blanca, including cheese, ube, pandan, and corn

Maja blanca can easily be adapted to include various other ingredients, often resulting in changes in the color of the dish. Examples include squash maja blanca which uses calabazas (Filipino: kalabasa) and a version of maja maíz that uses butter, resulting in a distinctive yellow color.

Other common variants include maja de ube (or maja ube), a deep purple variant of maja blanca which uses ube (purple yam); and maja buko pandán, a light green variant which is flavored with pandanus leaf and coconut meat.

== See also ==
- Tibok-tibok
- Kalamai
- Haupia
- Espasol
- Sapin-sapin
- List of dishes using coconut milk
- Manjar blanco
- Manjar branco
