= Julius Richard Petri =

German microbiologist (1852–1921)

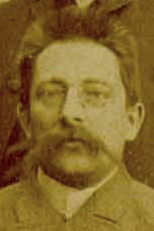
- Petri, c. 1888
- Born: 31 May 1852; Barmen, Westphalia, Kingdom of Prussia, German Confederation
- Died: 20 December 1921 (aged 69); Zeitz, Saxony, Free State of Prussia, Germany
- Scientific career
- Fields: Bacteriologist, military physician, surgeon
- Workplaces: Kaiserliches Gesundheitsamt, Göbersdorf sanatorium, German Hygiene Museum, Kaiserliches Gesundheitsamt

Julius Richard Petri (German: [ˈjuːli̯ʊs ˈʁɪçaʁt ˈpeːtʁiː]; 31 May 1852 – 20 December 1921) was a German microbiologist who is generally credited with inventing the device known as the Petri dish, which is named after him, while working as assistant to bacteriologist Robert Koch.

== Life and career ==
Petri was born in the town of Barmen (now a district of the city of Wuppertal), Germany, on 31 May 1852. He came from a distinguished family of scholars, and was the eldest son of Philipp Ulrich Martin Petri (1817–1864), a professor in Berlin, and Louise Petri. Petri's grandfather, Viktor Friedrich Leberecht Petri (1782–1857), was also a scholar, being both a director and professor at the Collegium Carolinum in Brunswick (Braunschweig), Germany.

Petri initially studied medicine at the Kaiser Wilhelm Academy for Military Physicians (1871–1875) and received his medical degree in 1876. He continued his studies at the Charité Hospital in Berlin, where his thesis on the chemistry of protein urine tests earned him his doctorate. He was on active duty as a military physician until 1882, continuing then as a reservist. In 1886 he was a curator at the German Hygiene Museum where he subsequently worked under Robert Koch. In 1900 he retired, while still remaining a secret government advisor, until his demise.

From 1877 to 1879 he was assigned to the Imperial Health Office (German: Kaiserliches Gesundheitsamt) in Berlin, where he became an assistant to Robert Koch. On the suggestion of Angelina Hesse, the New York-born wife of another assistant, Walther Hesse, the Koch laboratory began to culture bacteria on agar plates. Petri then invented the standard culture dish, or Petri plate, and further developed the technique of agar culture to purify or clone bacterial colonies derived from single cells. This advance made it possible to rigorously identify the bacteria responsible for diseases.

Petri's first wife, Anna Riesch, died in 1894 during childbirth. In 1897, he married Elizabeth Turk.

== Petri dish and discoveries ==
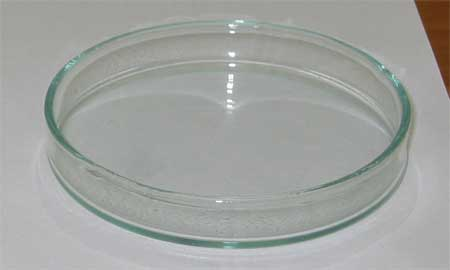
The Petri dish, widely used in microbiology studies to culture microorganisms

Petri dishes are used as research plates for microbiology studies. The dish is partially filled with warm liquid containing agar, and a mixture of specific ingredients that may include nutrients, blood, salts, carbohydrates, dyes, indicators, amino acids and antibiotics. After the agar cools and solidifies, the dish is ready to receive a microbe-laden sample in a process known as "inoculation" or "plating". For virus or phage cultures, a two-step inoculation is needed: bacteria that are grown act as a host for the viral inoculum.

The bacterial sample is diluted on the plate in a process called "streaking": a sterile plastic stick, or a wire loop which is sterilized by heating, is used to collect a sample, and then to make a streak on the dish with the agar. This process may be repeated multiple times using the same dish with a fresh stick or sterilized loop, and results in individual bacterial cells that are isolated on the plate, which then are capable of dividing and growing into single clonal bacterial colonies.

Petri plates can be incubated upside down (agar on top), which can help lessen the risk of contamination from airborne particles containing microbes settling and to decrease and prevent the chance of condensation from water accumulating and disturbing the microbes being cultured.

Scientists had long been growing cells in natural and synthetic matrix environments to elicit phenotypes that are not expressed on conventionally rigid substrates. Unfortunately, growing cells either on or within soft matrices can be an expensive, labour-intensive, and impractical undertaking.

The basic design of the Petri dish has not changed since being created by Petri in 1887. It was a challenge to keep dishes free of dust and extra bacteria that could collect and alter samples; heavy bell jars used for this purpose having proved ineffective, six years later Petri created a transparent plate slightly larger than the dish, which served as a transparent lid.

After his invention of the Petri dish, Petri left Koch's laboratory and ran the Göbersdorf sanatorium for Tuberculosis patients from 1882 to 1885. After running the Göbersdorf sanatorium, he became the director of the Museum of Hygiene in Berlin in the year 1886. Not only was Petri responsible for many innovations and inventions, but he also published a variety of papers, including 150 on the topic of bacteriology and hygiene, which contributed significantly to information and concepts related to them.

Petri's papers detailed a number of steps in understanding microbiology, not limited to the study of microorganisms but also including biological pathways and mechanisms. In his paper of 1876, he considered questions regarding proteins found within urine, seeking ways that they could be used to identify conditions or functions.

== Works ==
- Attempts at the chemistry of proteins. 1876.
- Methods of modern bacteria research (in: Collection Exoteric Scientific Lectures). 1887.
- The danger of carbon soda furnaces. 1889.
- Industrial hygiene. 1890.
- Experiments on the spread of contagious diseases, especially tuberculosis, by the railway and on measures to be taken. 1893.
- The microscope. From its beginnings to the present perfection. 1896.
- A judgment of high – pressure Pasteurising apparatus 1897.
- Towards quality testing in butter and milk. 1897.
- Apparatus for determination of water content in milk by distillation in a vacuum.

== Sources ==
- Peter Voswinckel (2001). "Petri, Julius Richard". Neue Deutsche Biographie (in German). Vol. 20. Berlin: Duncker & Humblot. pp. 263–264. (full text online).
