= Trevor A. Thorpe =

Barbadian plant biotechnologist (1936–2020)

Trevor Alleyne Thorpe
- Born: October 18, 1936; Barbados
- Died: May 18, 2020 (aged 83); Calgary, Canada
- Spouse: Yvonne Thorpe (née Cumberbatch (m. 1963))
- Children: 2
- Awards: Lifetime Achievement Award, SIVB (2004)

Academic work
- Discipline: Plant biology
- Sub-discipline: Plant physiology; Plant tissue culture; Biotechnology
- Institutions: University of Calgary

Trevor Alleyne Thorpe (October 18, 1936 – May 18, 2020) was a plant biotechnologist and professor emeritus at the University of Calgary.

== Personal life and education ==
Thorpe was born in Bridgetown, Barbados, to parents Mitchell and Violet (née Alleyne) Thorpe. After graduating from Harrison College in Barbados in 1953, he was awarded a Jawaharlal Nehru Scholarship to pursue his bachelor's degree at the Allahabad Agricultural Institute in Allahabad, India from 1956 to 1960. He continued his graduate studies as a Fulbright Scholar at the University of California, Riverside, where he earned his Ph.D. under doctoral advisor Toshio Murashige.

== Career ==
Thorpe began his academic career as an assistant professor at the University of Calgary in 1969. While at the University of Calgary, he held various positions, including Head of the Department of Biological Sciences and Assistant and Associate Dean. Thorpe was named professor emeritus and retired in 2000.

Throughout his career, Thorpe published over 220 scientific works, achieving an h-index of 70. His research was focused on the physiological aspects of plant morphogenesis using explants—excised pieces of plant parts—cultured in vitro. This work contributed significantly to the fundamental understanding of organized plant development both in vivo and in vitro. In his later work, he has made extensive contributions to conifer biotechnology. One of his books, Plant Tissue Culture: Methods and Applications in Agriculture was described as an "essential reference for all plant tissue culturists in the pre-internet era".

Thorpe was the president and chair for the International Association for Plant Biotechnology (IAPB) from 1974 to 1978. He also played a leading role for the development of the Society for In Vitro Biology (SIVB) in the USA, for which he was award the Lifetime Achievement Award in 2004. He was the founding Editor-in-Chief of the scientific journal In Vitro Cellular & Developmental Biology – Plant and served on the editorial boards of several other scientific journals, including Plant Cell Tissue and Organ Culture, Tree Physiology, Phytomorphology, and Physiologia Plantarum.

== Publications ==
=== Books ===
- Thorpe, Trevor A. (1981). Plant tissue culture: methods and applications in agriculture. New York: Academic Press. ISBN 978-0126906806.
- Tan Nhut, Duong; Tran Thanh Van, Kiem; Van Le, B.; Thorpe, Trevor A. (2003). Thin cell layer culture system: regeneration and transformation applications. Dordrecht: Springer Science+Business Media, B.V. ISBN 978-9048162598.
- Thorpe, Trevor A.; Yeung, Edward C. (2011). Plant Embryo Culture: Methods and Protocols. Totowa, NJ: Humana Press. ISBN 978-1617379871.

=== Articles ===
- Gamborg, O. L.; Murashige, T.; Thorpe, T. A.; Vasil, I. K. (1976). "Plant Tissue Culture Media". In Vitro. 12 (7): 473–478. Bibcode:1976IVCDB..12..473G. doi:10.1007/BF02796489. JSTOR 20170323. PMID 965014.
- Dhindsa, Rajinder S.; Plumb-Dhindsa, Pamela; Thorpe, Trevor A. (1981). "Leaf Senescence: Correlated with Increased Levels of Membrane Permeability and Lipid Peroxidation, and Decreased Levels of Superoxide Dismutase and Catalase". Journal of Experimental Botany. 32 (1): 93–101. doi:10.1093/jxb/32.1.93.
- Gaspar, Thomas; Kevers, Claire; Penel, Claude; Greppin, Hubert; Reid, David M.; Thorpe, Trevor A. (1 October 1996). "Plant hormones and plant growth regulators in plant tissue culture". In Vitro Cellular & Developmental Biology - Plant. 32 (4): 272–289. Bibcode:1996IVCDB..32..272G. doi:10.1007/BF02822700. ISSN 1475-2689.
- Thorpe, Trevor A. (1 October 2007). "History of plant tissue culture". Molecular Biotechnology. 37 (2): 169–180. doi:10.1007/s12033-007-0031-3. ISSN 1559-0305. PMID 17914178.
