= Gulaman =

Dried agar used to make jelly-like desserts in Filipino cuisine

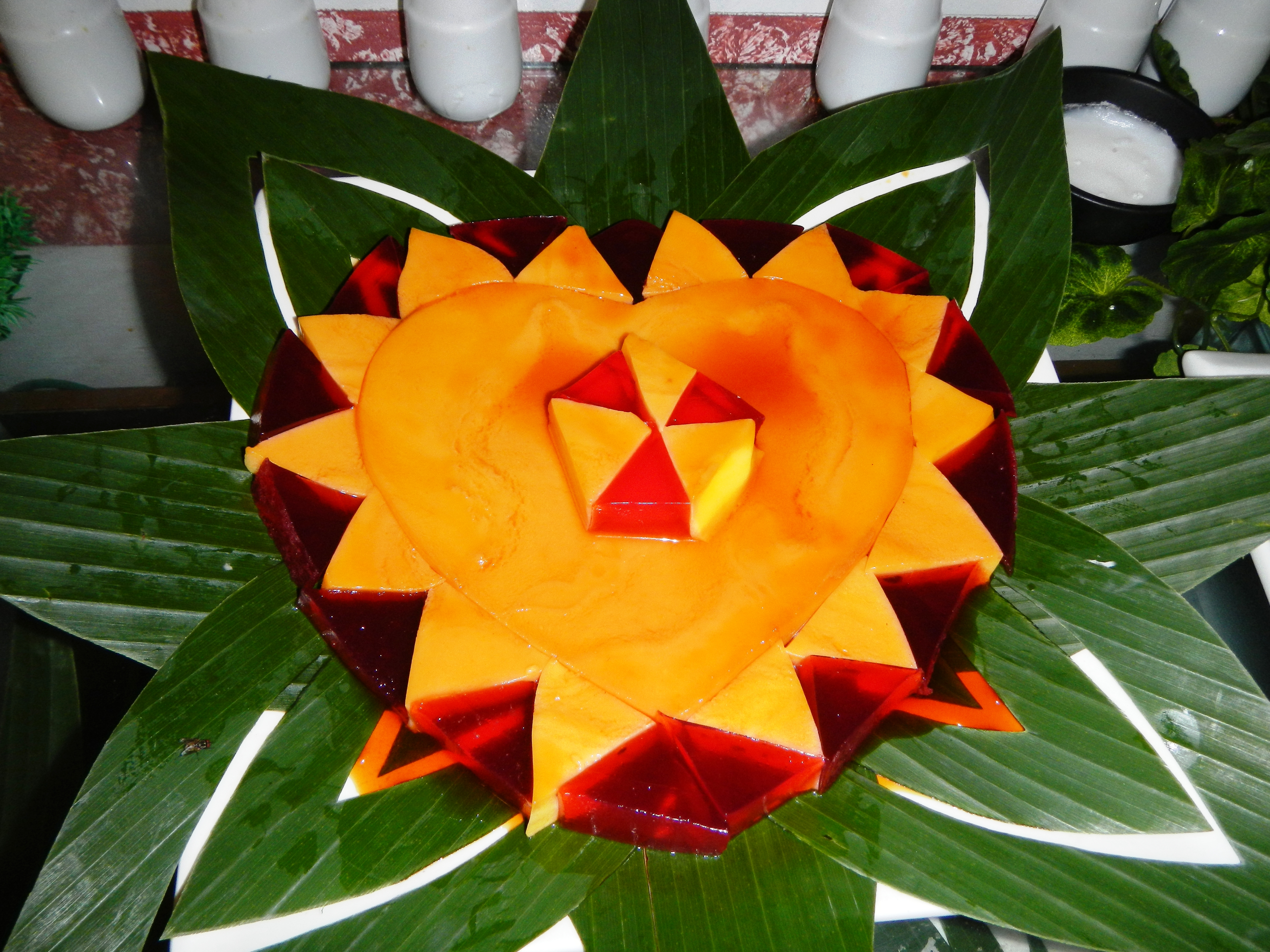
- A dessert made from leche flan and gulaman from Baliuag, Bulacan
- Course: Dessert
- Place of origin: Philippines
- Serving temperature: Cold
- Main ingredients: Agar

Gulaman, in Filipino cuisine, is a bar, or powdered form, of dried agar or carrageenan extracted from edible seaweed used to make jelly-like desserts. In common usage, it also usually refers to the refreshment sago't gulaman, sometimes referred to as samalamig, sold at roadside stalls and vendors.

== History ==
Gracilaria, which produces agar, is known as gulaman, guraman, gulaman dagat, or gar-garao in Tagalog and in other languages in the northern Philippines. It has been harvested and used as food for centuries, eaten both fresh or sun-dried and turned into jellies. The earliest historical attestation is from the Vocabulario de la lengua tagala (1754) by the Jesuit priests Juan de Noceda and Pedro de Sanlucar, where golaman or gulaman was defined as "una yerva, de que se haze conserva a modo de Halea, naze en la mar" (modern Spanish orthography: "una hierva, de que se hace conserva a modo de jalea, nace en la mar"; "an herb, from which a jam-like preserve is made, grows in the sea"), with an additional entry for guinolaman to refer to food made with the jelly.

Gulaman can also be made from Eucheuma spp., which produces the similarly jelly-like carrageenan. Eucheuma is known as gusô or tambalang in Visayan languages. Use of gusô to make jellies among the Visayans has been recorded in the even earlier Diccionario De La Lengua Bisaya, Hiligueina y Haraia de la isla de Panay y Sugbu y para las demas islas (c. 1637) of the Augustinian missionary Alonso de Méntrida (in Spanish). In the book, Méntrida describes gusô as being cooked until it melts, and then allowed to congeal into a sour dish.

== Description ==
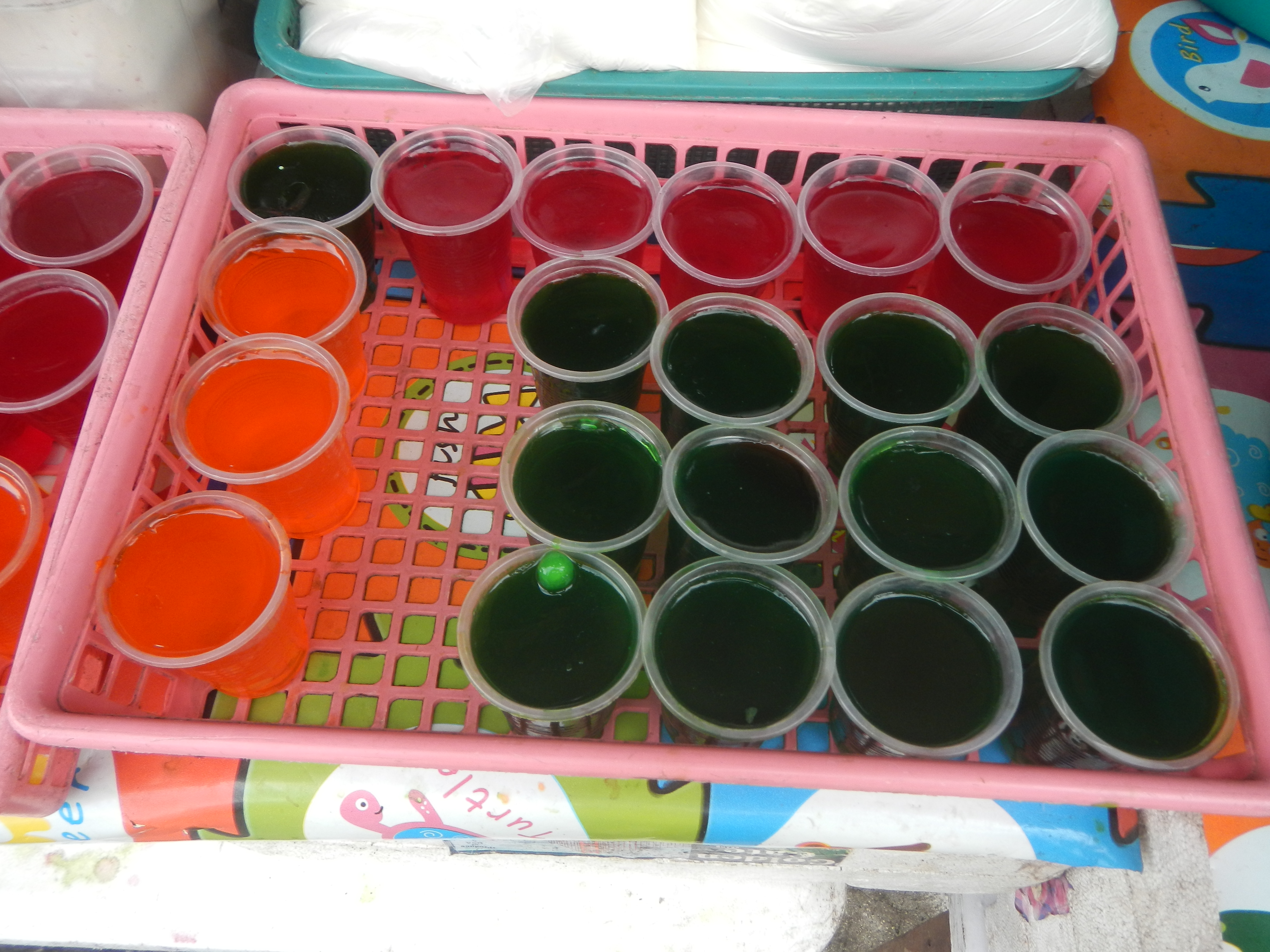
Various types of flavored gulaman sold in plastic cups

Gulaman is now the chief Filipino culinary use of agar, which is made of processed Gracilaria seaweed (around 18 species occur naturally in the Philippines); or carrageenan derived from other farmed seaweed species like Eucheuma and Kappaphycus alvarezii, which were first cultivated commercially in the Philippines. Aside from Gracilaria and Eucheuma, they were also traditionally made from other species of edible seaweeds including Betaphycus gelatinus, Gracilariopsis longissima, Gelidiella acerosa, and members of the genus Agardhiella.

It is usually sold dehydrated and formed into foot-long dry bars, which are either plain or coloured. It is also available in powder form.

== Uses ==
Gulaman bars are used in the various Filipino refreshments or desserts such as sago at gulaman, buko pandan, agar flan, halo-halo, fruit cocktail jelly, different varieties of Filipino fruit salads, black gulaman, and red gulaman.

== Differences from gelatine ==
The term gelatine (or "jelly") and gulaman are used synonymously in the Philippines, although they are very different products. While gelatine is an animal-derived protein, gulaman is a plant-derived carbohydrate made from seaweed. This distinction makes gulaman suitable for those whose dietary restrictions exclude gelatine, such as Muslims or vegans.

Gelatine dissolves in hot water, but boiling water is necessary to dissolve gulaman. Unlike gelatine which sets at cold temperatures, gulaman sets at room temperature. While gelatine can melt at room temperature, gulaman is uniquely thermo-reversible to its previous shape and form.

== See also ==
- List of Philippine desserts
- Chondrus crispus
- Kaong
- Nata de coco
- Sago
- Tapioca balls
