= Agar =

Thickening agent used in microbiology and food

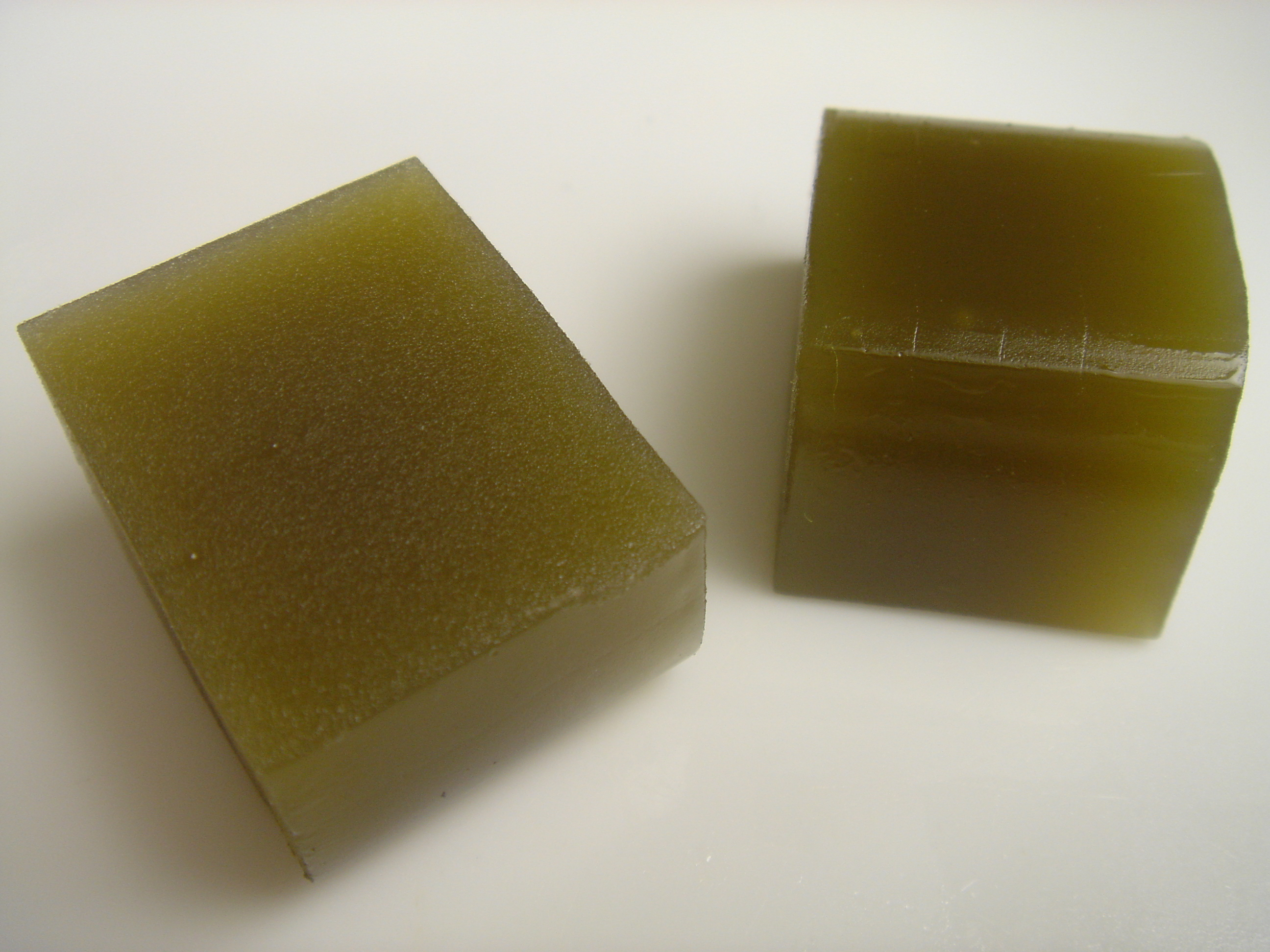
Green tea-flavored yōkan, a popular Japanese red bean jelly made from agar

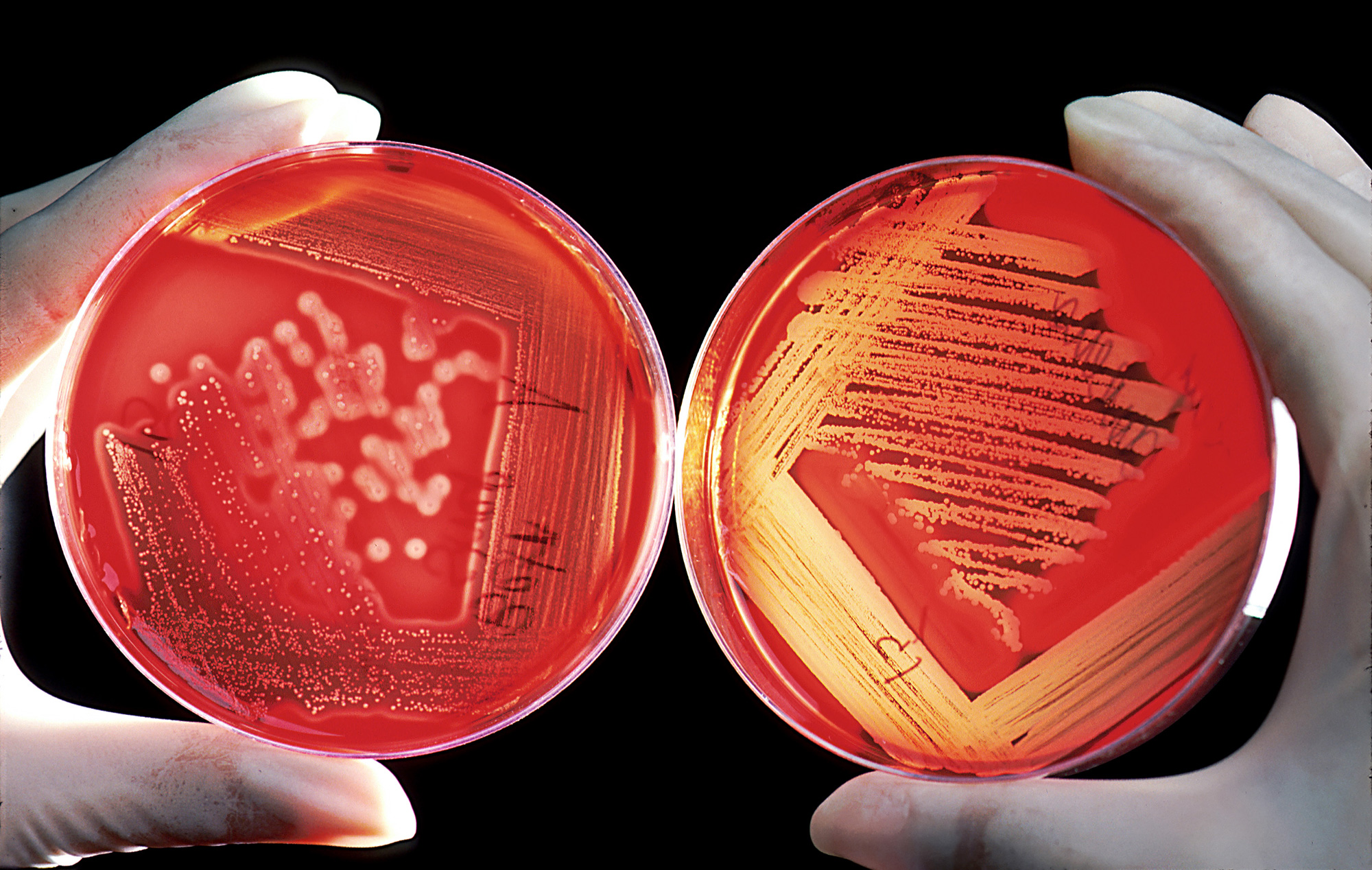
A blood agar plate used to culture bacteria and diagnose infection

Agar (/ˈeɪɡɑːr/ or /ˈɑːɡər/), or agar-agar, is a jelly-like substance consisting of polysaccharides obtained from the cell walls of some species of red algae (phylum Rhodophyta) primarily from the Gracilaria genus (Irish moss, ogonori) and the Gelidiaceae family (tengusa). These algae are known as agarophytes.

As found in nature, agar is a mixture of two components, the linear polysaccharide agarose and a heterogeneous mixture of smaller molecules called agaropectin. It forms the supporting structure in the cell walls of certain species of algae, and is released on boiling. The processing of food-grade agar removes the agaropectin, and the commercial product is essentially pure agarose.

Agar has been used as an ingredient in desserts throughout Asia and also as a solid substrate to contain culture media for microbiological work. Agar can be used as a laxative; an appetite suppressant; a vegan substitute for gelatin; a thickener for soups; in fruit preserves, ice cream, and other desserts; as a clarifying agent in brewing; and for sizing paper and fabrics.

== Etymology ==
The word agar comes from agar-agar, the Malay name for red algae (Gigartina, Eucheuma, Gracilaria) from which the jelly is produced. It is also known as kanten (Japanese: 寒天) (from the phrase kan-zarashi tokoroten (寒晒し心太) or "cold-exposed agar"), Japanese isinglass, China grass, Ceylon moss, and Jaffna moss. Gracilaria edulis or its synonym G. lichenoides is specifically referred to as agal-agal or Ceylon agar.

== History ==
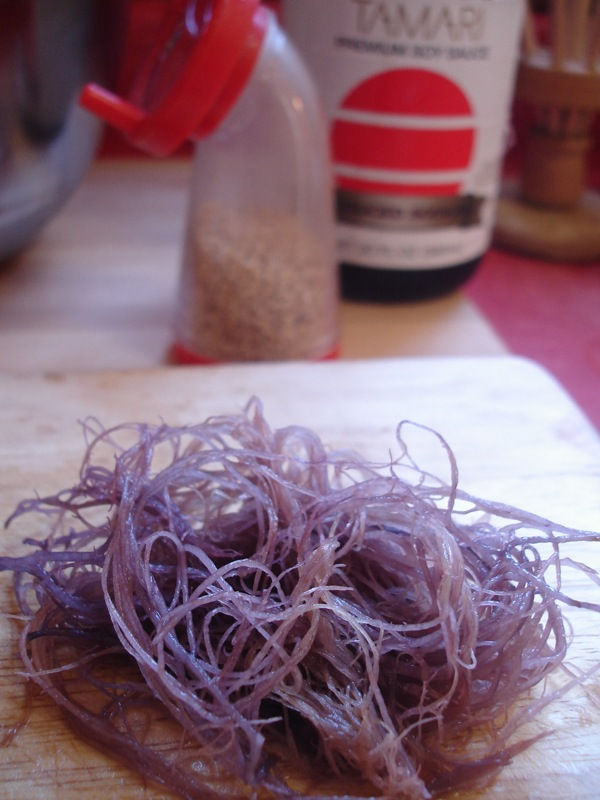
Ogonori, the most common red algae used to make agar

Macroalgae have been used widely as food by coastal cultures, including Japan and Southeast Asia. The method of production of agar in Japan is believed to have been discovered in 1658 by Mino Tarōzaemon (美濃 太郎左衞門), an innkeeper in current Fushimi-ku, Kyoto, who, according to legend, was said to have discarded surplus seaweed soup (Tokoroten) and noticed that after freezing in a winter night and drying in the sun after several days, it produced a dried substance that yielded a whiter jelly when reconstituted in boiling water and cooled.

In the Philippines, Gracilaria, known as gulaman (also guraman, gar-garao, or gulaman dagat, among other names) in Tagalog, have been harvested and used as food for centuries, eaten both fresh or sun-dried and turned into jellies. Gulaman was described in Vocabulario de la lengua tagala in 1754 by the Jesuit priests Juan de Noceda and Pedro de Sanlucar as "a herb, from which a jam-like preserve is made, grows in the sea", with an additional entry for guinolaman to refer to food made with the jelly. Carrageenan, derived from gusô (Eucheuma spp.), which also congeals into a gel-like texture is also used similarly among the Visayan peoples and have been recorded in the even earlier Diccionario De La Lengua Bisaya, Hiligueina y Haraia de la isla de Panay y Sugbu y para las demas islas (c. 1637) of the Augustinian missionary Alonso de Méntrida.

In Ambon Island in the Maluku Islands of Indonesia, agar is extracted from Graciliaria and eaten as a type of pickle or a sauce. Jelly seaweeds were also favoured and foraged by Malay communities living on the coasts of the Riau Archipelago and Singapore in Southeast Asia for centuries. 19th century records indicate that dried Graciliaria were one of the bulk exports of British Malaya to China. Poultices made from agar were also used for swollen knee joints and sores in Johore and Singapore.

Europeans who came across the jelly food product in the East Indies brought it to Europe, adopting the Malay term for the jelly, agar. Agar was first subjected to chemical analysis in 1859 by the French chemist Anselme Payen, who had obtained agar from the marine algae Gelidium corneum.

Beginning in the late 19th century, agar began to be used as a solid medium for growing various microbes. Agar was first described for use in microbiology in 1882 by the German microbiologist Walther Hesse, an assistant working in Robert Koch's laboratory, on the suggestion of his wife Fanny Hesse. Agar quickly supplanted gelatin as the base of microbiological media, due to its higher melting temperature, allowing microbes to be grown at higher temperatures without the media liquefying.

With its newfound use in microbiology, agar production quickly increased. This production centered on Japan, which produced most of the world's agar until World War II. However, with the outbreak of World War II, many nations were forced to establish domestic agar industries in order to continue microbiological research. Around the time of World War II, approximately 2,500 tons of agar were produced annually. By the mid-1970s, production worldwide had increased dramatically to approximately 10,000 tons each year. Since then, production of agar has fluctuated due to unstable and sometimes over-utilized seaweed populations.

== Chemical composition ==
The structure of an agarose polymer

Agar consists of a mixture of two polysaccharides: agarose and agaropectin. Agarose constitutes about 70% of the mixture, while agaropectin constitutes about 30% of it. Agarose is a linear polymer made up of repeating units of agarobiose, a disaccharide made up of D-galactose and 3,6-anhydro-L-galactopyranose. Agaropectin is a heterogeneous mixture of smaller molecules that occur in lesser amounts, and is made up of alternating units of D-galactose and L-galactose heavily modified with acidic side-groups, such as sulfate, glucuronate, and pyruvate.

== Physical properties ==
Agar exhibits a phenomenon known as hysteresis whereby, when mixed with water, it solidifies and forms a gel below about 32–42 °C (305–315 K; 90–108 °F), which is called the gel point, and melts above 85 °C (358 K; 185 °F), which is the melting point. Hysteresis is the property of having a difference between the gel point and melting point temperatures. This property lends a suitable balance between easy melting and good gel stability at relatively high temperatures. Since many scientific applications require incubation at temperatures close to human body temperature (37 °C), agar is more appropriate than other solidifying agents that melt at this temperature, such as gelatin.

== Uses ==
=== Culinary ===
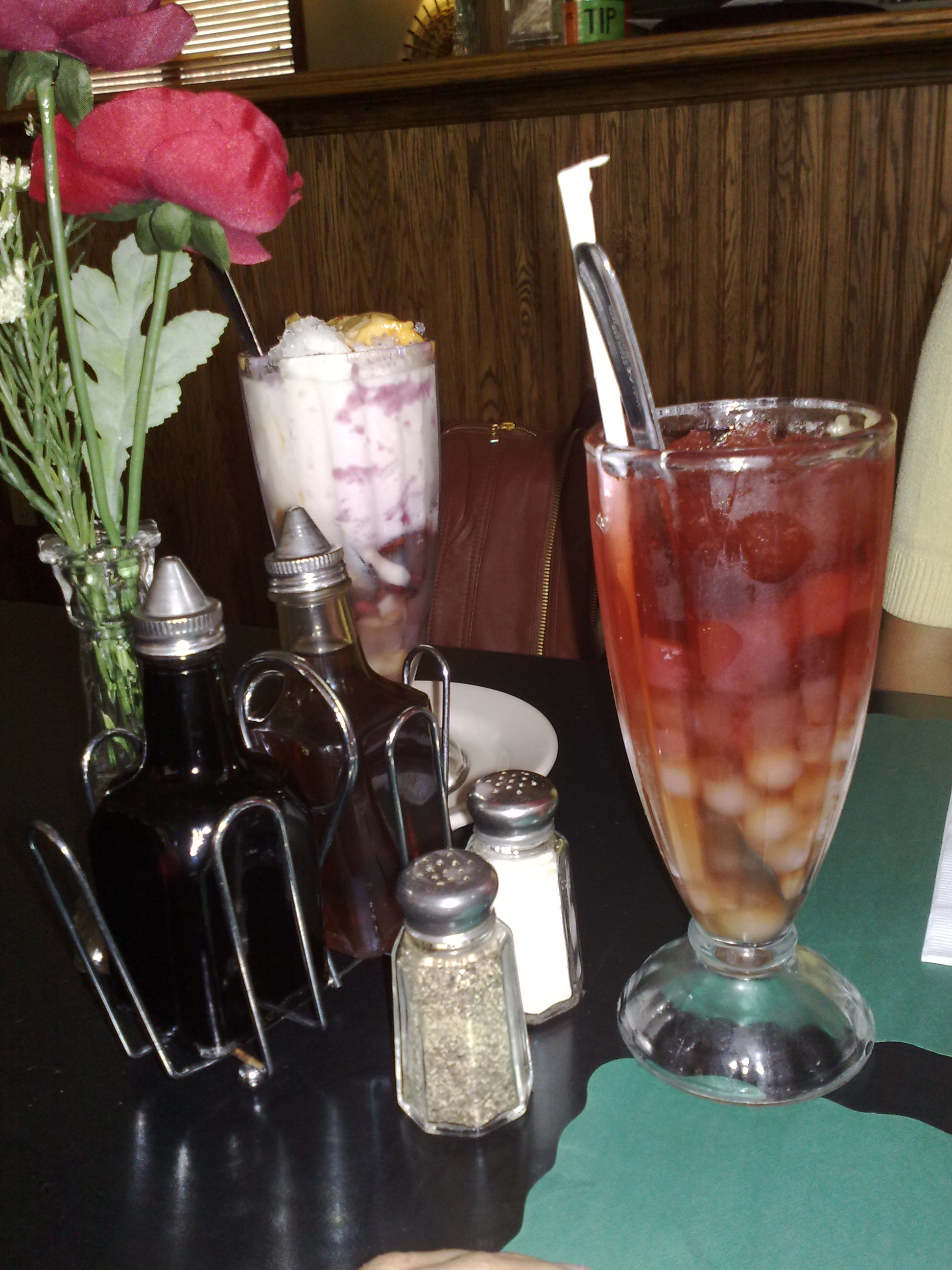
Sago at gulaman in Filipino cuisine is made from agar (gulaman), pearl sago, and sugar syrup flavored with pandan.

Agar-agar is a natural vegetable gelatin counterpart. It is white and semi-translucent when sold in packages as washed and dried strips or in powdered form. It can be used to make jellies, puddings, and custards. When making jelly, it is boiled in water until the solids dissolve. Sweetener, flavoring, coloring, fruits and or vegetables are then added, and the liquid is poured into molds to be served as desserts and vegetable aspics or incorporated with other desserts such as a layer of jelly in a cake.

Agar-agar is approximately 80% dietary fiber, so it can serve as an intestinal regulator. Its bulking quality has been behind fad diets in Asia, for example the kanten (the Japanese word for agar-agar) diet. Once ingested, kanten triples in size and absorbs water. This results in the consumers feeling fuller.

==== Asian culinary ====
One use of agar in Japanese cuisine is in anmitsu, a dessert made of small cubes of agar jelly and served in a bowl with various fruits or other ingredients. It is also the main ingredient in mizu yōkan, another popular Japanese food. In Philippine cuisine, it is used to make the jelly bars in the various gulaman refreshments like sago't gulaman, samalamig, or desserts such as buko pandan, agar flan, halo-halo, fruit cocktail jelly, and the black and red gulaman used in various fruit salads. In Vietnamese cuisine, jellies made of flavored layers of agar-agar, called thạch, are a popular dessert, and are often made in ornate molds for special occasions. In Indian cuisine, agar is used for making desserts. In Burmese cuisine, a sweet jelly known as kyauk kyaw is made from agar. Agar jelly is used as a topping in Taiwanese bubble tea.

==== Other culinary ====
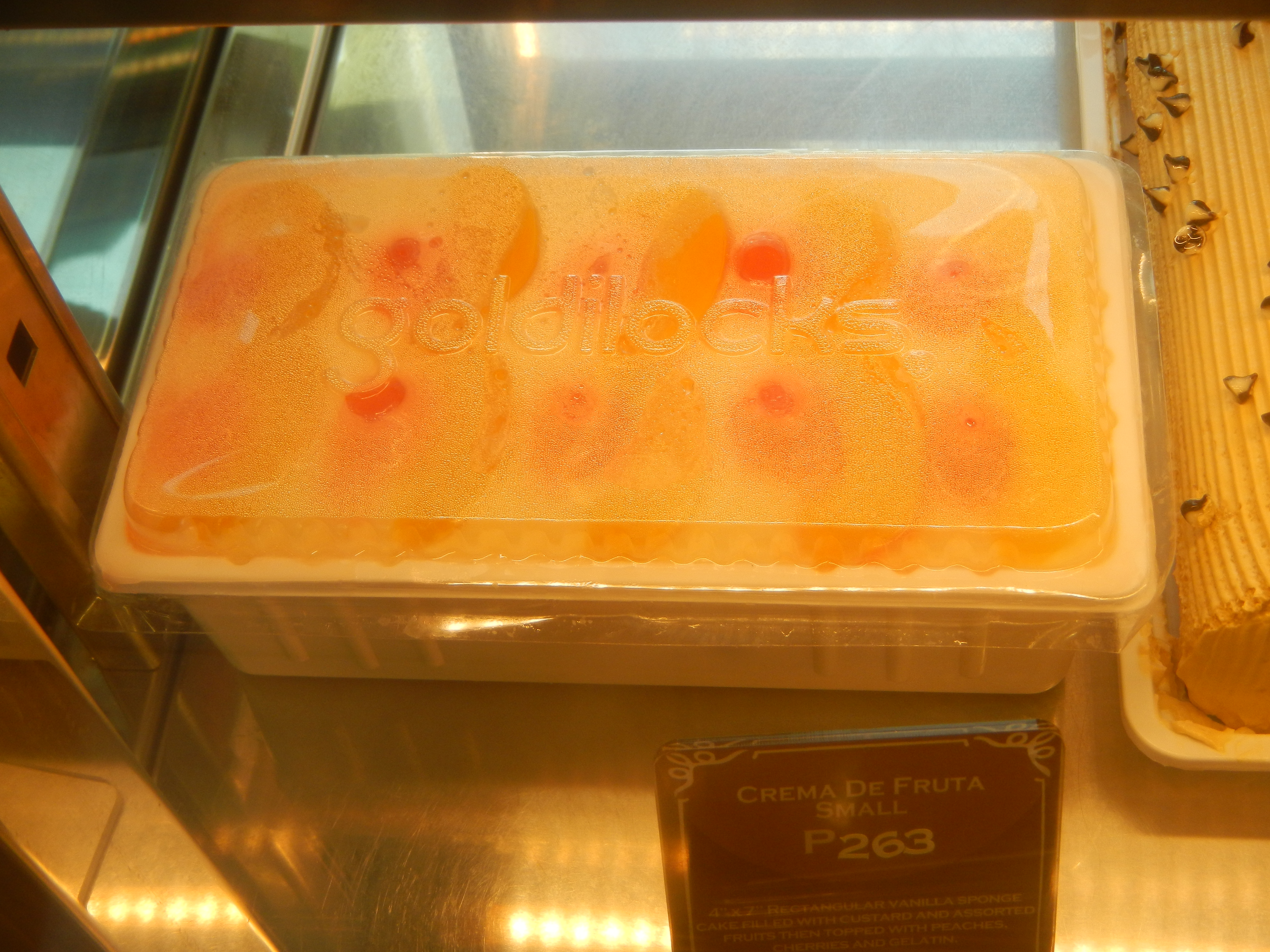
Crema de fruta, a traditional Filipino fruitcake, is made with an agar layer on top to keep the fruit components in place.

It can be used as addition to (or as a replacement for) pectin in jelly, jam, or marmalade, as a substitute to gelatin for its superior gelling properties, and as a strengthening ingredient in souffles and custards. Another use of agar-agar is in a Russian dish ptich'ye moloko (bird's milk), a rich jellified custard (or soft meringue) used as a cake filling or chocolate-glazed as individual sweets.

Agar-agar may also be used as the gelling agent in gel clarification, a culinary technique used to clarify stocks, sauces, and other liquids. Mexico has traditional candies made out of Agar gelatin, most of them in colorful, half-circle shapes that resemble a melon or watermelon fruit slice, and commonly covered with sugar. They are known in Spanish as Dulce de Agar (Agar sweets)

Agar-agar is an allowed nonorganic/nonsynthetic additive used as a thickener, gelling agent, texturizer, moisturizer, emulsifier, flavor enhancer, and absorbent in certified organic foods.

=== Microbiology ===
==== Agar plate ====
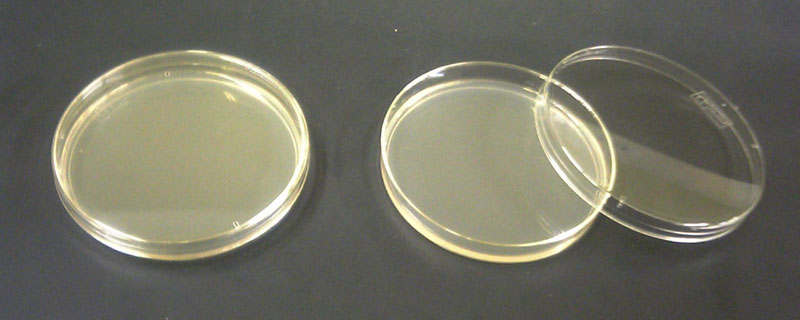
100 mm (3.9 in) diameter Petri dishes containing agar gel for bacterial culture

An agar plate or Petri dish is used to provide a growth medium using a mix of agar and other nutrients in which microorganisms, including bacteria and fungi, can be cultured and observed under the microscope. Agar is indigestible for many organisms so that microbial growth does not affect the gel used and it remains stable. Agar is typically sold commercially as a powder that can be mixed with water and prepared similarly to gelatin before use as a growth medium. Nutrients are typically added to meet the nutritional needs of the microbes organism, the formulations of which may be "undefined" where the precise composition is unknown, or "defined" where the exact chemical composition is known. Agar is often dispensed using a sterile media dispenser.

Different algae produce various types of agar. Each agar has unique properties that suit different purposes. Because of the agarose component, the agar solidifies. When heated, agarose has the potential to melt and then solidify. Because of this property, they are referred to as "physical gels". In contrast, polyacrylamide polymerization is an irreversible process, and the resulting products are known as chemical gels.

There are a variety of different types of agar that support the growth of different microorganisms. A nutrient agar may be permissive, allowing for the cultivation of any non-fastidious microorganisms; a commonly used nutrient agar for bacteria is the Luria Bertani (LB) agar which contains lysogeny broth, a nutrient-rich medium used for bacterial growth. Additionally, 2216 Marine Broth (MB) agar, with high salt content, is optimized for growing heterotrophic marine bacteria like those of the Vibrio genus, while Terrific Broth (TB) agar is used to non-selectively culture high yields of the bacterium E. coli. More generally, enriched media is an agar variety that is infused with the necessary nutrients required by fastidious organisms to grow. Despite the large diversity of agar mediums, yeast extract is a common ingredient across all varieties as it is a macronutrient that provides a nitrogen source for all bacterial cell types.

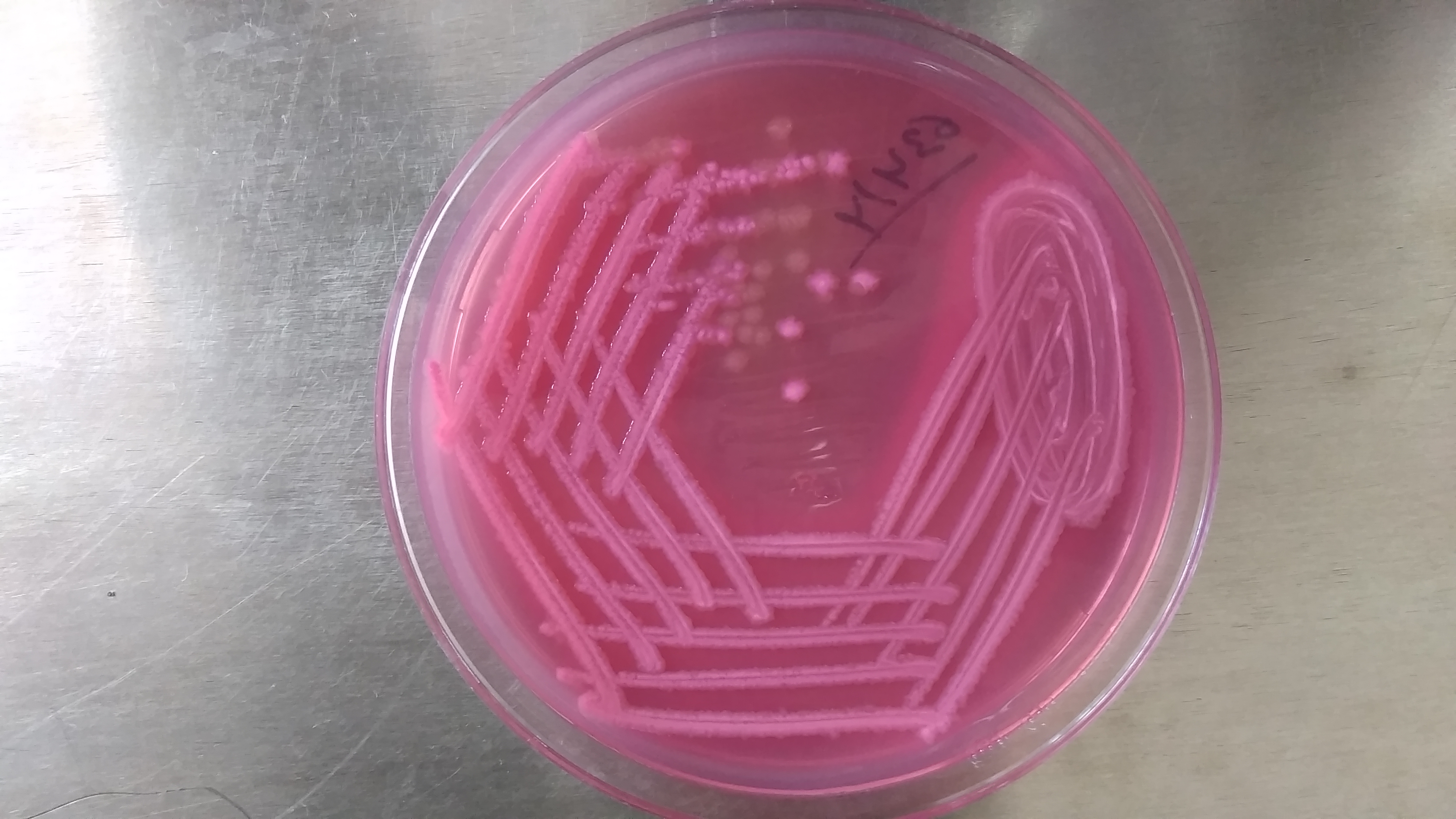

Other fastidious organisms may require the addition of different biological fluids such as horse or sheep blood, serum, egg yolk, and so on. Agar plates can also be selective, and can be used to promote the growth of bacteria of interest while inhibiting others. A variety of chemicals may be added to create an environment favourable for specific types of bacteria or bacteria with certain properties, but not conducive for growth of others. For example, antibiotics may be added in cloning experiments whereby bacteria with antibiotic-resistant plasmid are selected. In addition to antibiotic treated agar, other selective and indicator agar plates include TCBS agar and MacConkey agar. Thiosulfate citrate bile salts sucrose (TCBS) agar is used to differentiate Vibrio species based on their sucrose metabolism, since only some will metabolize the sucrose in the plate and change its pH. Indicator dyes included in the gel will display a visual change of the pH by changing the gel color from green to yellow. MacConkey agar contains bile salts and crystal violet to selectively grow gram-negative bacteria and differentiate between species using pH-indicator dyes that demonstrate lactose metabolism properties.

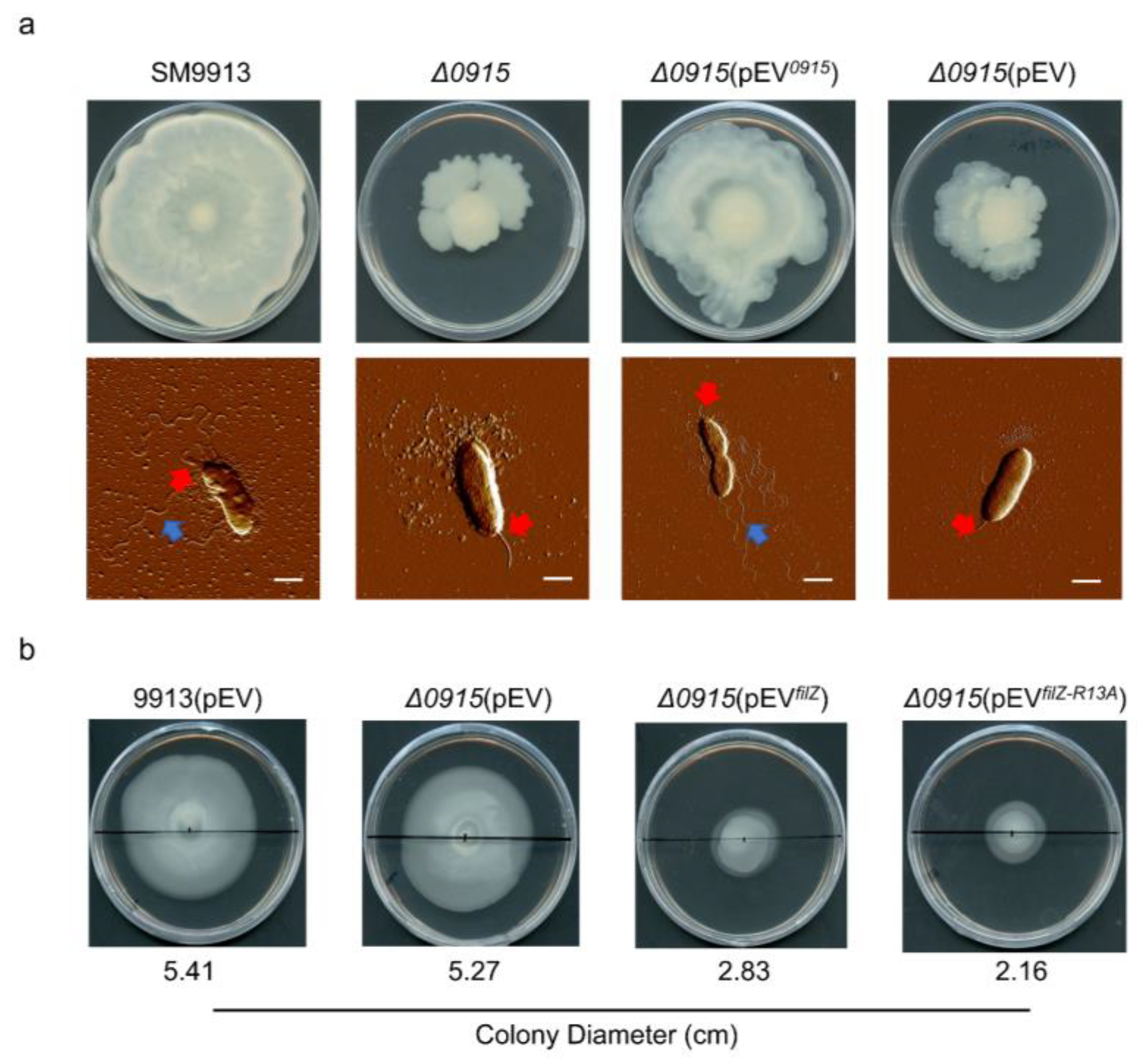

==== Motility assays ====
As a gel, an agar or agarose medium is porous and therefore can be used to measure microorganism motility and mobility. The gel's porosity is directly related to the concentration of agarose in the medium, so various levels of effective viscosity (from the cell's "point of view") can be selected, depending on the experimental objectives.

A common identification assay involves culturing a sample of the organism deep within a block of nutrient agar. Cells will attempt to grow within the gel structure. Motile species will be able to migrate, albeit slowly, throughout the gel, and infiltration rates can then be visualized, whereas non-motile species will show growth only along the now-empty path introduced by the invasive initial sample deposition.

Another setup commonly used for measuring chemotaxis and chemokinesis utilizes the under-agarose cell migration assay, whereby a layer of agarose gel is placed between a cell population and a chemoattractant. As a concentration gradient develops from the diffusion of the chemoattractant into the gel, various cell populations requiring different stimulation levels to migrate can then be visualized over time using microphotography as they tunnel upward through the gel against gravity along the gradient.

=== Plant biology ===
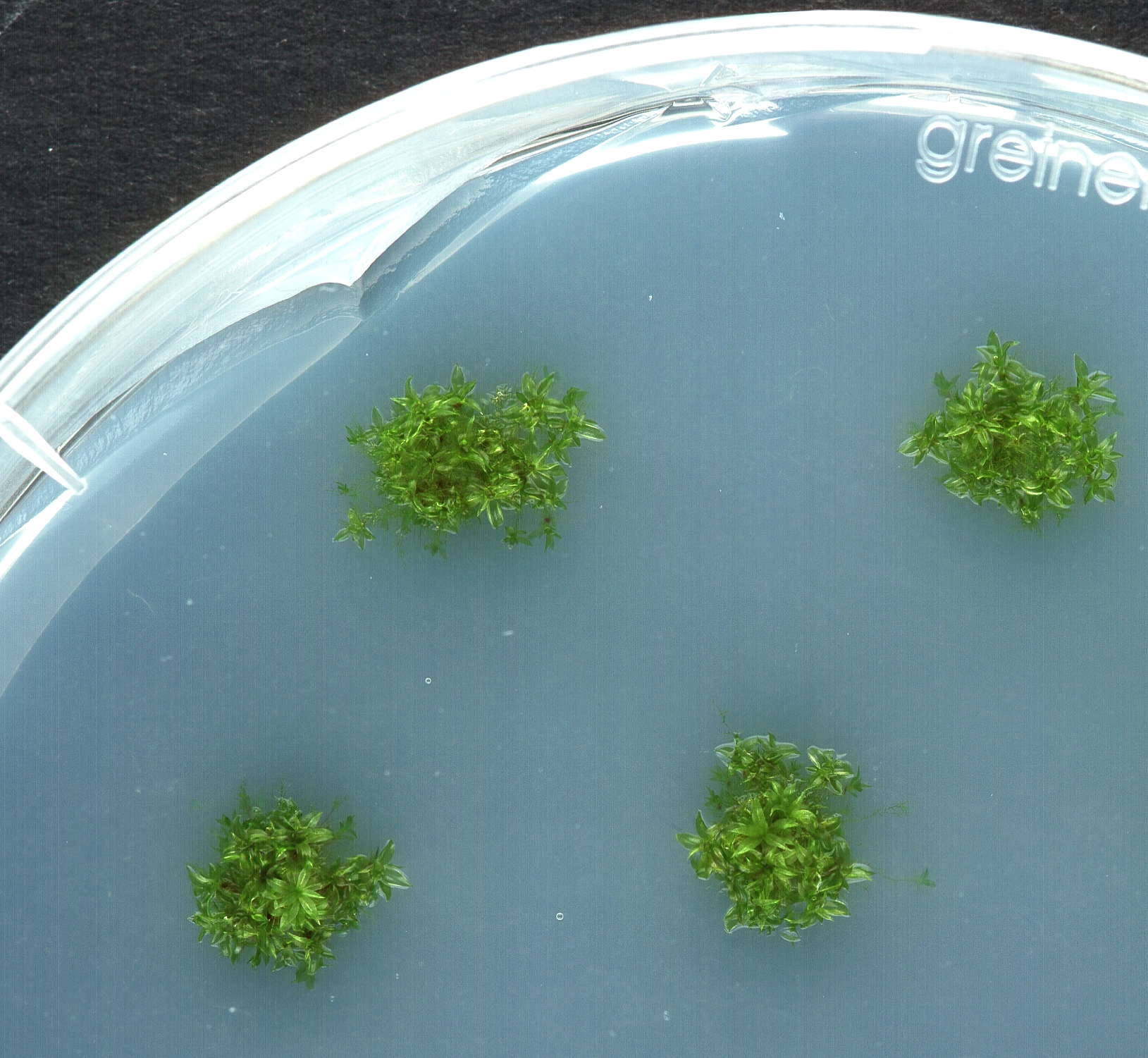
Physcomitrella patens plants growing axenically in vitro on agar plates. Petri dish is 9 cm (3.5 in) in diameter.

Research grade agar is used extensively in plant biology as it is optionally supplemented with a nutrient and/or vitamin mixture that allows for seedling germination in Petri dishes under sterile conditions (given that the seeds are sterilized as well). Nutrient and/or vitamin supplementation for Arabidopsis thaliana is standard across most experimental conditions. Murashige & Skoog (MS) nutrient mix and Gamborg's B_{5} vitamin mix in general are used. A 1.0% agar/0.44% MS+vitamin dH_{2}O solution is suitable for growth media between normal growth temps.

When using agar, within any growth medium, it is important to know that the solidification of the agar is pH-dependent. The optimal range for solidification is between 5.4 and 5.7. Usually, the application of potassium hydroxide is needed to increase the pH to this range. A general guideline is about 600 μl 0.1M KOH per 250 ml GM. This entire mixture can be sterilized using the liquid cycle of an autoclave.

This medium nicely lends itself to the application of specific concentrations of phytohormones etc. to induce specific growth patterns in that one can easily prepare a solution containing the desired amount of hormone, add it to the known volume of GM, and autoclave to both sterilize and evaporate off any solvent that may have been used to dissolve the often-polar hormones. This hormone/GM solution can be spread across the surface of Petri dishes sown with germinated and/or etiolated seedlings.

Experiments with the moss Physcomitrella patens, however, have shown that choice of the gelling agent – agar or Gelrite – does influence phytohormone sensitivity of the plant cell culture.

=== Other uses ===
Agar is used:

- As an impression material in dentistry.
- As a medium to precisely orient the tissue specimen and secure it by agar pre-embedding (especially useful for small endoscopy biopsy specimens) for histopathology processing
- To make salt bridges and gel plugs for use in electrochemistry.
- In formicariums as a transparent substitute for sand and a source of nutrition.
- As a natural ingredient in forming modeling clay for young children to play with.
- As an allowed biofertilizer component in organic farming.
- As a substrate for precipitin reactions in immunology.
- At different times as a substitute for gelatin in photographic emulsions, arrowroot in preparing silver paper and as a substitute for fish glue in resist etching.
- As an MRI elastic gel phantom to mimic tissue mechanical properties in Magnetic Resonance Elastography
- In the Arts, for example in "microbial art" in which agar acts as canvas, and microbes as a form of paint

Gelidium agar is used primarily for bacteriological plates. Gracilaria agar is used mainly in food applications.

In 2016, AMAM, a Japanese company, developed a prototype for agar-based commercial packaging system called Agar Plasticity, intended as a replacement for oil-based plastic packaging.

== See also ==
- Agarose gel electrophoresis – Method for separation and analysis of biomolecules using agarose gel
- Algaculture – Aquaculture involving the farming of algae
- Alginic acid – Polysaccharide found in brown algae
- Asepsis – Absence of disease-causing microorganisms
- Bacterial cellulose – Organic compound
- Carrageenan – Natural linear sulfated polysaccharide
- Gellan gum – Gelling and thickening agent
- Immunodiffusion
- Immunoelectrophoresis – Biochemical methods of separation and characterization of proteins
- Lima bean agar – Agar medium used to cultivate Phytophthora sojae
- Ouchterlony double immunodiffusion – Biomedical technique
- R2A agar – Bacterial culture medium
- Radial immunodiffusion – Laboratory technique
- SEAgel – Type of aerogel
- Tokoroten – Seaweed-based Japanese dish
