= Agaropectin =

Polysaccharide that is a sulfated galactan

- Chemical structure of agaropectin, where R is a predominantly H or SO_{3}H

Identifiers
CAS Number	9046-34-8
- Except where otherwise noted, data are given for materials in their standard state (at 25 °C [77 °F], 100 kPa). Infobox references

Agaropectin is one of the two main components of agar.

== Structure ==
Agaropectin is a sulfated galactan mixture which composes agar by 30% composition. It is composed of varying percentages of organosulfates (sulfate esters), D-glucuronic acid and small amounts of pyruvic acid. It is made up of alternating units of D-galactose and L-galactose heavily modified with acidic side-groups which are usually sulfate, glucuronate, and pyruvate. Pyruvic acid is possibly attached in an acetal form to the D-galactose residues of the agarobiose skeleton. The sulfate content of the agar depends on the source of the raw material from which it is derived. Acetylation of agaropectin yields the chloroform-insoluble agaropectin acetate, as opposed to agarose acetate. This process can be used to separate the two polysaccharides via fractionation.

== Use ==
Agaropectin has no commercial value and is discarded during the commercial processing of agar, and food grade agar is mainly composed of agarose with a molecular weight of about 120 kDa.
