= Radial immunodiffusion =

Laboratory technique

Radial immunodiffusion (RID), Mancini immunodiffusion or single radial immunodiffusion assay, is an immunodiffusion technique used in immunology to determine the quantity or concentration of an antigen in a sample.

== Description ==
=== Preparation ===
A solution containing antibody is added to a heated medium such as agar or agarose dissolved in buffered normal saline. The molten medium is then poured onto a microscope slide or into an open container, such as a Petri dish, and allowed to cool and form a gel. A solution containing the antigen is then placed in a well that is punched into the gel. The slide or container is then covered, closed or placed in a humidity box to prevent evaporation.

The antigen diffuses radially into the medium, forming a circle of precipitin that marks the boundary between the antibody and the antigen. The diameter of the circle increases with time as the antigen diffuses into the medium, reacts with the antibody, and forms insoluble precipitin complexes. The antigen is quantitated by measuring the diameter of the precipitin circle and comparing it with the diameters of precipitin circles formed by known quantities or concentrations of the antigen.

Antigen-antibody complexes are small and soluble when in antigen excess. Therefore, precipitation near the center of the circle is usually less dense than it is near the circle's outer edge, where antigen is less concentrated.

Expansion of the circle reaches an endpoint and stops when free antigen is depleted and when antigen and antibody reach equivalence. However, the clarity and density of the circle's outer edge may continue to increase after the circle stops expanding.

=== Interpretation ===
Best-fit line plots. RID often produces similar plots when the horizontal abcissa (X-axis) contains the initial antigen concentrations, the vertical ordinate (Y-axis) contains the squares of the precipitin ring diameters, and each plot is a measurement time. The entirely curved purple plot (bottom) appears when all rings are expanding. The entirely straight red plot (top) appears when all rings have reached their endpoints and have stopped expanding. Intermediate plots are partially straight and partially curved (see and).

For most antigens, the area and the square of the diameter of the circle at the circle's endpoint are directly proportional to the initial quantity of antigen and are inversely proportional to the concentration of antibody. Therefore, a graph that compares the quantities or concentrations of antigen in the original samples with the areas or the squares of the diameters of the precipitin circles on a best-fit line plot will usually be a straight line after all circles have reached their endpoints (equivalence method).

Circles that small quantities of antigen create reach their endpoints before circles that large quantities create do so. Therefore, if areas or diameters of circles are measured while some, but not all, circles have stopped expanding, such a graph will be straight in the portion whose wells initially contained the smaller quantities or concentrations of antigen and will be curved in the portion whose wells contained the larger quantities or concentrations.

While circles are still expanding, a graph that compares the initial quantities or concentrations of the antigen on a logarithmic scale with the diameters or areas of the circles on a linear scale may be a straight line (kinetic method). However, circles of the precipitate are smaller and less distinct during expansion than they are after expansion has ended. Further, temperature affects the rate of expansion, but does not affect the size of a circle at its endpoint. In addition, the range of circle diameters for the same initial quantities or concentrations of antigen is smaller while some circles are enlarging than they are after all circles have reached their endpoints.

The quantity and concentration of insoluble antigen-antibody complexes at the outer edge of the circle increase with time. The clarity and density of the circle's outer edge therefore also increase with time. As a result, measurements of the sizes of circles and graphs produced from these measurements are often more accurate after circles have stopped expanding than they are when circles are still enlarging. For those reasons, it is often more desirable to take measurements after all circles have reached their endpoints than it is to take measurements while some or all circles are still enlarging.

Measurements of large circles are more accurate than are those of small circles. It is therefore often desirable to adjust the concentration of antibody and the initial quantities of antigen to assure that precipitin rings will be large.

== Radial immunodiffusion techniques ==
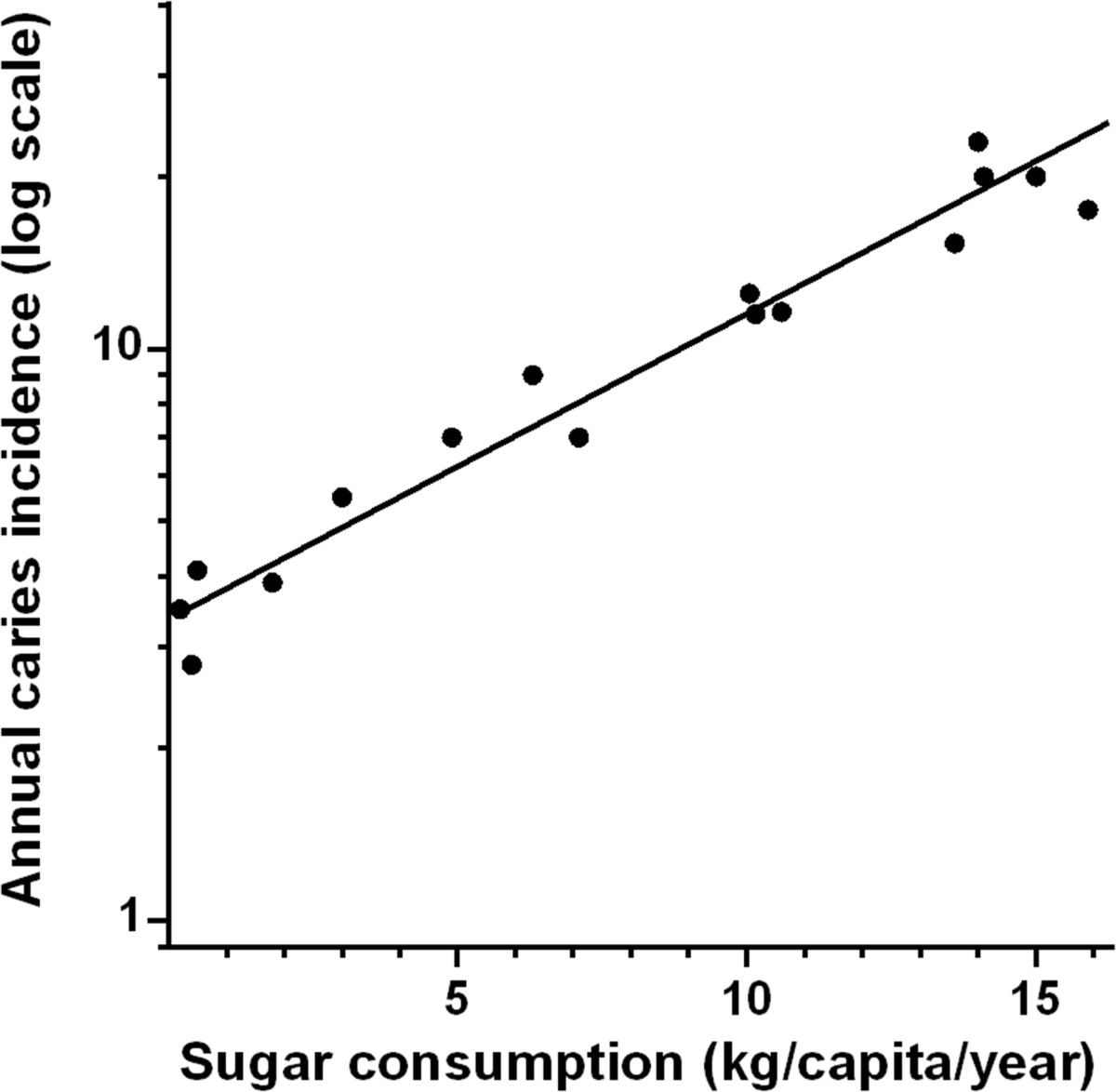
Straight line on a best-fit semi-logarithmic plot. RID often produces a similar plot while all precipitin circles are expanding, as in the kinetic method (see and).

One can determine the antigen concentration in a sample whose concentration is unknown by finding its location on a graph that charts the diameters of precipitin circles produced by three or more reference samples with known antigen concentrations. Two techniques often produce straight lines on such graphs. The techniques produce those lines on different types of graphs.

The techniques and their graphs are:

- Measuring circles while all are expanding (kinetic method): graph charting logarithms of initial antigen concentrations vs. diameters of precipitin circles on a best-fit semi-logarithmic plot.
- Measuring circles after all reach their end points (equivalence method): graph charting initial antigen concentrations vs. squares of diameters of precipitin circles on a best-fit line plot.
