= Immunodiffusion =

- MeSH: D005779

Immunodiffusion is a diagnostic test which involves diffusion through a substance such as agar which is generally soft gel agar (2%) or agarose (2%), used for the detection of antibodies or antigen.

The commonly known types are:

1. Single diffusion in one dimension (Oudin procedure)
2. Double diffusion in one dimension (Oakley Fulthorpe procedure)
3. Single diffusion in two dimensions (radial immunodiffusion or Mancini method)
4. Double diffusion in two dimensions (Ouchterlony double immunodiffusion)
