= Robert Koch =

German physician and bacteriologist (1843–1910)

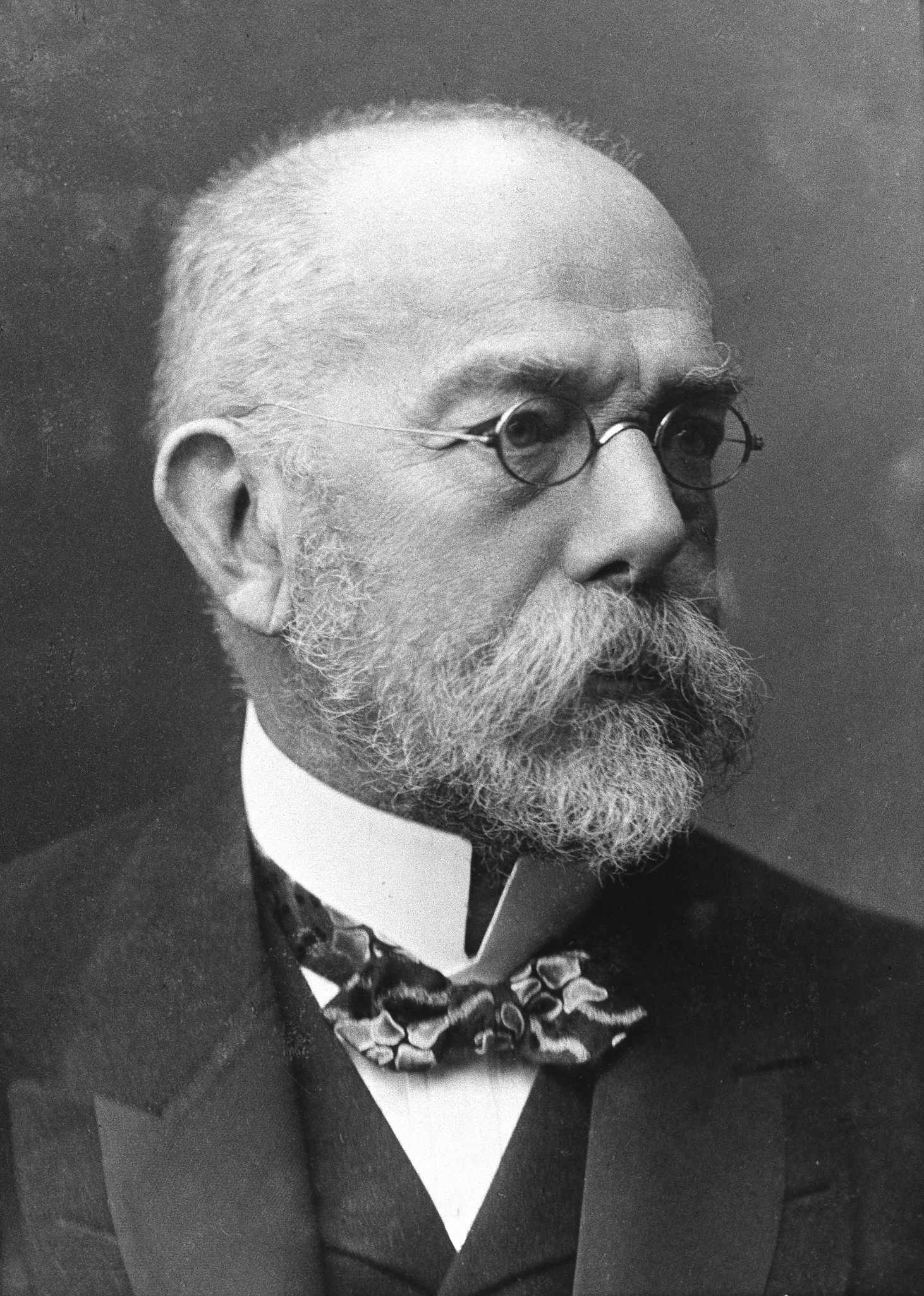
- Koch in c. 1900
- Born: Heinrich Hermann Robert Koch; 11 December 1843; Clausthal, Kingdom of Hanover, German Confederation
- Died: 27 May 1910 (aged 66); Baden-Baden, Grand Duchy of Baden, German Empire
- Education: University of Göttingen
- Known for: Koch's postulates Koch–Pasteur rivalry Bacterial culture method Germ theory of disease Medical microbiology Discovery of anthrax bacillus Discovery of tuberculosis bacillus and tuberculin Discovery of cholera bacillus
- Awards: Nobel Prize in Medicine (1905); Pour le Mérite (1906)
- Scientific career
- Fields: Microbiology
- Workplaces: Imperial Health Office, Berlin; University of Berlin
- Doctoral advisor: Georg Meissner
- Other academic advisors: Friedrich Gustav Jakob Henle; Karl Ewald Hasse; Rudolf Virchow
- Notable students: August von Wasserman, Paul Ehrlich, Richard Pfeiffer, Emil von Behring, Shibasaburo Kitasato, Friedrich Loeffler, and George Gaffky

Heinrich Hermann Robert Koch (/kɒx/ KOKH; German: [ˈʁoːbɛʁt kɔx]; 11 December 1843 – 27 May 1910) was a German physician and microbiologist. He won the 1905 Nobel Prize in Physiology or Medicine "for his investigations and discoveries in relation to tuberculosis".

As the discoverer of the specific causative agents of deadly infectious diseases, including tuberculosis, cholera, and anthrax, he is regarded as one of the main founders of modern bacteriology. As such, he is popularly nicknamed the father of microbiology (with Louis Pasteur), and as the father of medical bacteriology. His discovery of the anthrax bacterium (Bacillus anthracis) in 1876 is considered the birth of modern bacteriology. Koch used his discoveries to establish that germs "could cause a specific disease" and directly provided proofs for the germ theory of diseases, therefore creating the scientific basis of public health, saving millions of lives. For his life's work, Koch is seen as one of the founders of modern medicine.

While working as a private physician, Koch developed many innovative techniques in microbiology. He was the first to use the oil immersion lens, condenser, and microphotography in microscopy. His invention of the bacterial culture method using agar and glass plates (later developed as the Petri dish by his assistant Julius Richard Petri) made him the first to grow bacteria in the laboratory. In appreciation of his work, he was appointed as the government advisor at the Imperial Health Office in 1880, promoted to a senior executive position (Geheimer Regierungsrat) in 1882, Director of Hygienic Institute and Chair (Professor of hygiene) of the Faculty of Medicine at Berlin University in 1885, and the Royal Prussian Institute for Infectious Diseases (later renamed Robert Koch Institute after his death) in 1891.

The methods Koch used in bacteriology led to the establishment of a medical concept known as Koch's postulates, four generalized medical principles to ascertain the relationship of pathogens with specific diseases. The concept is still in use in most situations and influences subsequent epidemiological principles such as the Bradford Hill criteria. A major controversy followed when Koch discovered tuberculin as a medication for tuberculosis which was proven to be ineffective, but developed for diagnosis of tuberculosis after his death. The day he announced the discovery of the tuberculosis bacterium, 24 March 1882, has been observed by the World Health Organization as "World Tuberculosis Day" every year since 1982.

== Early life and education ==
Koch was born in Clausthal, Germany, on 11 December 1843, to Hermann Koch (1814–1877) and Mathilde Julie Henriette (née Biewend; 1818–1871). His father was a mining engineer. He was the third of thirteen siblings. He excelled academically from an early age. Before entering school in 1848, he had taught himself how to read and write. He completed secondary education in 1862, having excelled in science and math.

At the age of 19, in 1862, Koch entered the University of Göttingen to study natural science. He took up mathematics, physics, and botany. He was appointed assistant in the university's Pathological Museum. After three semesters, he decided to change his area of study to medicine, as he aspired to be a physician. During his fifth semester at the medical school, Jacob Henle, an anatomist who had published a theory of contagion in 1840, asked him to participate in his research project on uterine nerve structure. This research won him a research prize from the university and enabled him to briefly study under Rudolf Virchow, who was at the time considered "Germany's most renowned physician". In his sixth semester, Koch began to research at the Physiological Institute, where he studied the secretion of succinic acid, which is a signalling molecule that is also involved in the metabolism of the mitochondria. This would eventually form the basis of his dissertation. In January 1866, he graduated from the medical school, earning honours of the highest distinction, maxima cum laude.

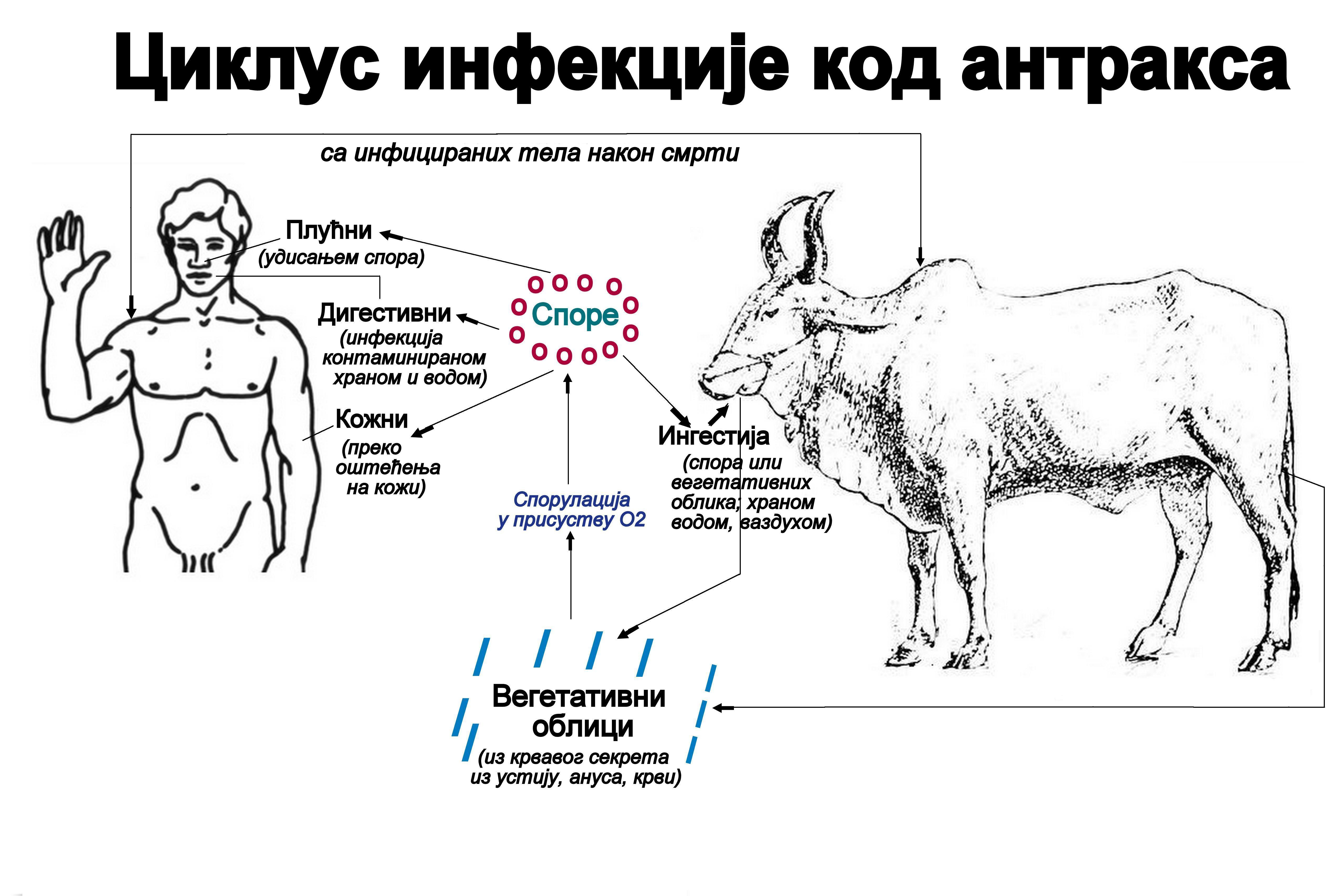
The Anthrax Disease Cycle. Anthrax particles live in a vegetative state until exposed to oxygen, where they form many infectious spores. They can live in the soil and be consumed by herbivores. Large herbivores, like cows, are most susceptible to anthrax disease, and humans are affected by animal waste, fecal matter, or corpses, from these herbivores. Anthrax infection is spread to humans when spores gain entry into the body, whether that is from inhalation, open wounds, or another method of entrance. Once inside, the spores are activated, allowing the bacteria to multiply and spread their toxins. Another spread of infection is through biting flies, like mosquitoes, that come in contact with the blood and feces of herbivores, preceded by contact with human flesh (information from Bergman et al., 2006).

== Career ==
After graduating in 1866, Koch briefly worked as an assistant in the General Hospital of Hamburg. In October of that year, he moved to the Idiot's Hospital of Langenhagen (as it was known in English, later renamed the KRH Psychiatrie Langenhagen), near Hanover, as a junior physician. In 1868, he moved to Neimegk and then to Rakwitz in 1869. After the Franco-Prussian War started in 1870, he enlisted in the German army as a volunteer surgeon in 1871 to support the war effort. He was discharged a year later and was appointed as a district physician (Kreisphysikus) in Wollstein in Prussian Posen (now Wolsztyn, Poland). His family settled there, and his wife gave him a microscope as a birthday gift. With the microscope, he set up a private laboratory and started his career in microbiology.

Koch began conducting research on microorganisms in a laboratory connected to his patient's examination room. His early research in this laboratory yielded one of his major contributions to the field of microbiology, as he developed the technique of growing bacteria. Furthermore, he managed to isolate and grow selected pathogens in a pure laboratory culture. His discovery of the anthrax bacillus (later named Bacillus anthracis) hugely impressed Ferdinand Julius Cohn, professor at the University of Breslau (now the University of Wrocław), who helped him publish the discovery in 1876. Cohn had established the Institute of Plant Physiology and invited Koch to demonstrate his new bacterium there in 1877. Koch was transferred to Breslau as district physician in 1879. A year later, he left for Berlin when he was appointed a government advisor at the Imperial Health Office, where he worked from 1880 to 1885. Following his discovery of the tuberculosis bacterium, he was promoted to Geheimer Regierungsrat, a senior executive position, in June 1882.

In 1885, Koch received two appointments as an administrator and professor at Berlin University. He became Director of Hygienic Institute and Chair (Professor of hygiene) of the Faculty of Medicine. In 1891, he relinquished his professorship and became a director of the Royal Prussian Institute for Infectious Diseases (now the Robert Koch Institute), which consisted of a clinical division and beds for the division of clinical research. For this, he accepted harsh conditions. The Prussian Ministry of Health insisted after the 1890 scandal with tuberculin, which Koch had discovered and intended as a remedy for tuberculosis, that any of Koch's inventions would unconditionally belong to the government and he would not be compensated. Koch lost the right to apply for patent protection. In 1906, he moved to East Africa to research a cure for trypanosomiasis (sleeping sickness). He established the Bugula research camp, where up to 1000 people a day were treated with the experimental drug Atoxyl.

== Scientific contributions ==
=== Anthrax ===
Robert Koch is widely known for his work with anthrax, discovering the causative agent of the fatal disease to be Bacillus anthracis. After officially becoming a district physician in Wollstein (today's Wolsztyn), Poland, in 1872, Koch began to study anthrax. Near Wollstein, anthrax was regularly taking the lives of humans and livestock without evidence explaining why. Eventually, in 1876, Koch discovered that anthrax was triggered by one singular pathogen. Koch's discovery of the dormant stage, the anthrax spores, allowed him to successfully unravel the mystery behind anthrax. By gaining a better understanding of this pathogen, he was able to shed light on the bacterium's resistance to environmental factors ("Robert Koch – Nobel Lecture" 2018). This groundbreaking achievement marked Koch as the pioneer scientist to discover that a microscopic organism was causing a disease to spread. His findings were especially impressive as they were done in a poorly equipped laboratory in Wollstein.

He published the discovery in a booklet as "Die Ätiologie der Milzbrand-Krankheit, Begründet auf die Entwicklungsgeschichte des Bacillus Anthracis" (The Etiology of Anthrax Disease, Based on the Developmental History of Bacillus Anthracis) in 1876 while working in Wollstein. His publication in 1877 on the structure of anthrax bacterium marked the first photography of a bacterium. He discovered the formation of spores in anthrax bacteria, which could remain dormant under specific conditions. However, under optimal conditions, the spores were activated and caused disease. To determine this causative agent, he dry-fixed bacterial cultures onto glass slides, used dyes to stain the cultures, and observed them through a microscope. His work with anthrax is notable in that he was the first to link a specific microorganism with a specific disease, rejecting the idea of spontaneous generation and supporting the germ theory of disease.

=== Techniques in bacteria study ===
Robert Koch made two important developments in microscopy; he was the first to use an oil immersion lens and a condenser that enabled smaller objects to be seen. In addition, he was also the first to effectively use photography (microphotography) for microscopic observation. He introduced the "bedrock methods" of bacterial staining using methylene blue and Bismarck (Vesuvin) brown dye. In an attempt to grow bacteria, Koch began to use solid nutrients such as potato slices. Through these initial experiments, Koch observed individual colonies of identical, pure cells. He found that potato slices were not suitable media for all organisms, and later began to use nutrient solutions with gelatin. However, he soon realized that gelatin, like potato slices, was not the optimal medium for bacterial growth, as it did not remain solid at 37 °C, the ideal temperature for growth of most human pathogens. Furthermore, many bacteria can hydrolyze gelatin, making it a liquid. As suggested to him by his post-doctoral assistant Walther Hesse, who got the idea from his wife Fanny Hesse, in 1881, Koch started using agar to grow and isolate pure cultures. Agar is a polysaccharide that remains solid at 37 °C, is not degraded by most bacteria, and results in a stable transparent medium.

==== Development of Petri dish ====
Koch's booklet published in 1881 titled "Zur Untersuchung von pathogenen Organismen" (Methods for the Study of Pathogenic Organisms) has been known as the "Bible of Bacteriology." In it he described a novel method of using glass slide with agar to grow bacteria. The method involved pouring a liquid agar onto the glass slide and then spreading a thin layer of gelatin over it. The gelatin made the culture medium solidify, in which bacterial samples could be spread uniformly. The whole bacterial culture was then put on a glass plate together with a small wet paper. Koch named this container as feuchte Kammer (moist chamber). The typical chamber was a circular glass dish 20 cm in diameter and 5 cm in height, and had a lid to prevent contamination. The glass plate and the transparent culture media made observation of the bacterial growth easy.

Koch publicly demonstrated his plating method at the Seventh International Medical Congress in London in August 1881. There, Louis Pasteur exclaimed, "C'est un grand progrès, Monsieur!" ("What a great progress, Sir!") It was using Koch's microscopy and agar-plate culture method that his students discovered new bacteria. Friedrich Loeffler discovered the bacteria of glanders (Burkholderia mallei) in 1882 and diphtheria (Corynebacterium diphtheriae) in 1884; and Georg Theodor August Gaffky, the bacterium of typhoid (Salmonella enterica) in 1884. Koch's assistant Julius Richard Petri developed an improved method and published it in 1887 as "Eine kleine Modification des Koch’schen Plattenverfahrens" (A minor modification of the plating technique of Koch). The culture plate was given an eponymous name Petri dish. It is often asserted that Petri developed a new culture plate, but this was not so. He simply discarded the use of a glass plate and instead used the circular glass dish directly, not just as a moist chamber, but as the main culture container. This further reduced the chances of contamination. It would also have been appropriate if the name "Koch dish" had been given.

=== Tuberculosis ===
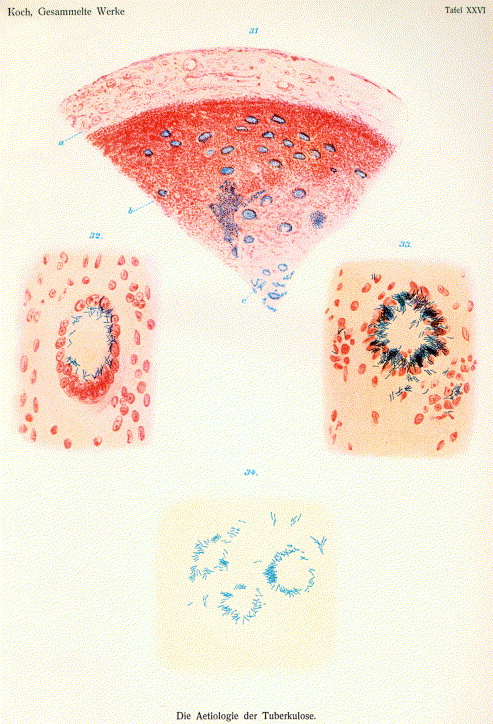
Koch's drawing of tuberculosis bacilli in 1882 (from Die Ätiologie der Tuberkulose)

During his time as the government advisor with the Imperial Health Agency in Berlin in the 1880s, Koch became interested in tuberculosis research. At the time, it was widely believed that tuberculosis was an inherited disease. However, Koch was convinced that the disease was caused by a bacterium and was infectious. In 1882, he published his findings on tuberculosis, in which he reported the causative agent of the disease to be the slow-growing Mycobacterium tuberculosis. He published the discovery as "Die Ätiologie der Tuberkulose" (The Etiology of Tuberculosis), and presented it before the German Physiological Society at Berlin on 24 March 1882. Koch said,

When the cover-glasses were exposed to this staining fluid [methylene blue mixed with potassium hydroxide] for 24 hours, very fine rod-like forms became apparent in the tubercular mass for the first time, having, as further observations showed, the power of multiplication and of spore formation and hence belonging to the same group of organisms as the anthrax bacillus... Microscopic examination then showed that only the previously blue-stained cell nuclei and detritus became brown, while the tubercle bacilli remained a beautiful blue.

There was no particular reaction to this announcement. Eminent scientists such as Rudolf Virchow remained sceptical. Virchow clung to his theory that all diseases are due to faulty cellular activities. On the other hand, Paul Ehrlich later recollected that this moment was his "single greatest scientific experience." Koch expanded the report and published it under the same title as a booklet in 1884, in which he concluded that the discovery of tuberculosis bacterium fulfilled the three principles, eventually known as Koch's postulates, which were formulated by his assistant Friedrich Loeffler in 1883, saying:

All these factors together allow me to conclude that the bacilli present in the tuberculous lesions do not only accompany tuberculosis, but rather cause it. These bacilli are the true agents of tuberculosis.

==== Tuberculosis treatment and tuberculin ====
Koch gave much of his research attention to tuberculosis throughout his career. After medical expeditions to various parts of the world, he again focused on tuberculosis from the mid-1880s. By that time, the Imperial Health Office was carrying out a project for disinfection of sputum of tuberculosis patients. Koch experimented with arsenic and creosote as possible disinfectants. These chemicals and other available drugs did not work. His report in 1883 also mentioned a failed experiment in an attempt to make a tuberculosis vaccine. In 1888, Koch turned his attention to synthetic dyes as antibacterial chemicals. He developed a method for examining antibacterial activity by mixing the gelatin-based culture media with a yellow dye, auramin. His notebook indicates that by February 1890, he had tested hundreds of compounds. In one such test, he found that an extract from the tuberculosis bacterium culture dissolved in glycerine could cure tuberculosis in guinea pigs. Based on a series of experiments from April to July 1891, he concluded that the extract did not kill the tuberculosis bacterium, but destroyed (by necrosis) the infected tissues, thereby depriving bacterial growth. He made a vague announcement in August 1890 at the Tenth International Medical Congress in Berlin, saying,

In a communication which I made a few months ago to the International Medical Congress [in London in 1881], I described a substance of which the result is to make laboratory animals insensitive to inoculation of tubercle bacilli, and in the case of already infected animals, to bring the tuberculous process to a halt. I can tell […] that much, that guinea pigs, which are highly susceptible to the disease [tuberculosis], no longer react upon inoculation with tubercle virus [bacterium] when treated with that substanc,e and that in guinea pigs, which are sick (with tuberculosis), the pathological process can be brought to a complete standstill.

In November 1890, Koch demonstrated the effectiveness of the extract in treating humans by administering the vaccine through the Bacillus Calmette-Guerin (BCG) technique. This absorbs the vaccine through the skin by means of multiple shallow punctures on the skin and many patients and doctors went to Berlin to get Koch's remedy. While this was effective in humans, his experiments also revealed that when the substance was inoculated into his tuberculosis-infected test guinea pigs, they presented with severe symptoms. This outcome, characterized by an exaggerated immune response, coined the term "Koch’s phenomenon." This is known as an extreme skin reaction that manifests itself at the BCG vaccination site within a few days after the vaccine is administered to an individual infected with tuberculosis. When a normal guinea pig was inoculated with pure tubercle bacillus, the wound would close rapidly and heal within several days. Afterwards, the site of the injection would open and form an ulcer until the animal died. However, if the same inoculated culture was injected into a guinea pig that was previously infected with tuberculosis, the site of the injection becomes dark and eventually heals normally and quickly (Moreland, 2024). The uncertainty in the chemical nature coined the term phenomenon in the name "Koch’s phenomenon."

Koch published his experiments in the 15 January 1891 issue of Deutsche Medizinische Wochenschrift, and The British Medical Journal immediately published the English version simultaneously. The English version was also reproduced in Nature, and The Lancet in the same month. The Lancet presented it as "glad tidings of great joy." Koch simply referred to the medication as "brownish, transparent fluid." Josephs Pohl-Pincus had used the name tuberculin in 1844 for tuberculosis culture media, and Koch subsequently adopted as "tuberkulin."

The first report on the clinical trial in 1891 was disappointing. By then, 1061 patients with tuberculosis of internal organs and 708 patients with tuberculosis of external tissues were given the treatment. An attempt to use tuberculin as a therapeutic drug is regarded as Koch's "greatest failure." With it his reputation greatly waned. But he devoted the rest of his life trying to make tuberculin as a usable medication. His discovery was not a total failure: the substance is now used to test for hypersensitivity in tuberculosis patients.

=== Cholera ===
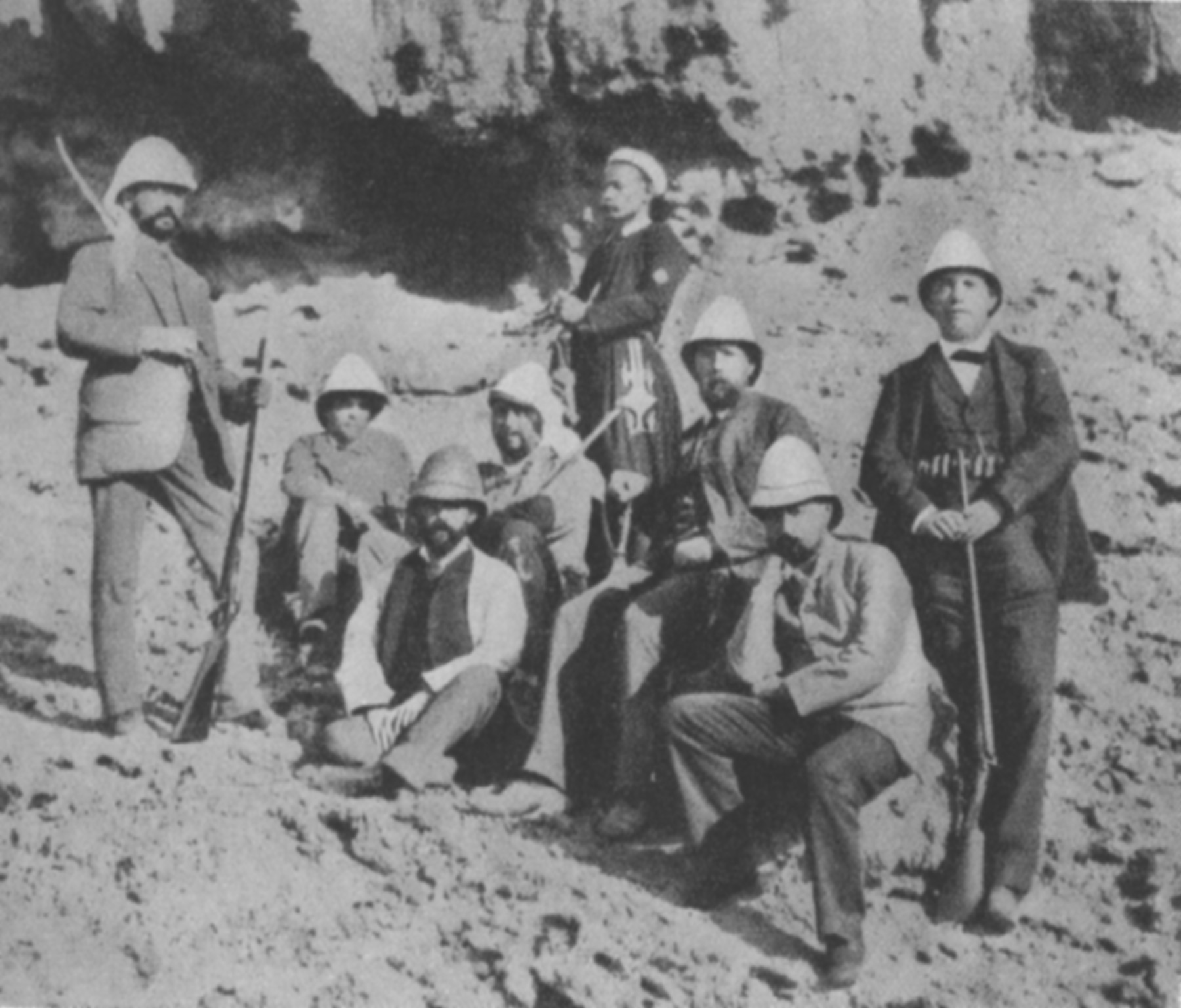
Photograph of Koch (third from the right) and other members of the German Cholera Commission in Egypt, 1884

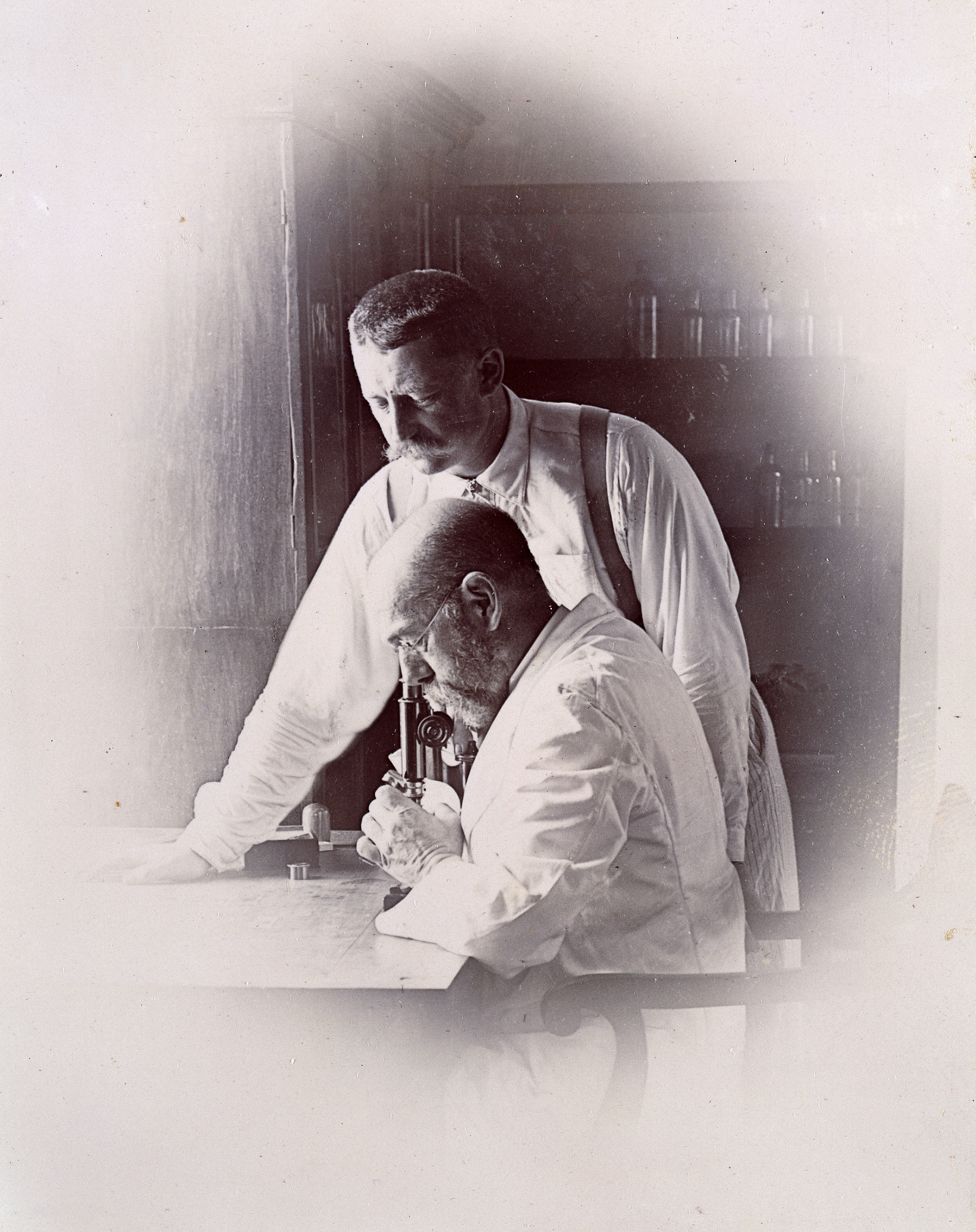
Koch (on the microscope) and his colleague Richard Friedrich Johannes Pfeiffer (standing) investigating cholera outbreak in Bombay, India

In August 1883, the German government sent a medical team led by Koch to Alexandria, Egypt, to investigate a cholera epidemic there. Koch soon found that the intestinal mucosa of people who died of cholera always had bacterial infection, yet could not confirm whether the bacteria were the causative pathogens. As the outbreak in Egypt declined, he was transferred to Calcutta (now Kolkata), India, where there was a more severe outbreak. He soon found that the river Ganges was the source of cholera. He performed autopsies of almost 100 bodies, and found in each bacterial infection. He identified the same bacteria from water tanks, linking the source of the infection. He isolated the bacterium in pure culture on 7 January 1884. He subsequently confirmed that the bacterium was a new species and described it as "a little bent, like a comma." His experiment using fresh blood samples indicated that the bacterium could kill red blood cells, and he hypothesized that some sort of poison was used by the bacterium to cause the disease. In 1959, Indian scientist Sambhu Nath De discovered this poison, the cholera toxin. Koch reported his discovery to the German Secretary of State for the Interior on 2 February, and published it in the Deutsche Medizinische Wochenschrift (German Medical Weekly) the following month.

Although Koch was convinced that the bacterium was the cholera pathogen, he could not entirely establish critical evidence that the bacterium produced the symptoms in healthy subjects (following Koch's postulates). His experiment on animals using his pure bacteria culture did not cause the disease, and correctly explained that animals are immune to human pathogens. The bacterium was then known as "the comma bacillus", and scientifically as Bacillus comma. It was later realised that the bacterium was already described by an Italian physician Filippo Pacini in 1854, and was also observed by the Catalan physician Joaquim Balcells i Pascual around the same time. But they failed to identify the bacterium as the causative agent of cholera. Koch's colleague Richard Friedrich Johannes Pfeiffer correctly identified the comma bacillus as Pacini's vibrioni and renamed it as Vibrio cholera in 1896.

=== Acquired immunity ===
Koch observed the phenomenon of acquired immunity. On 26 December 1900, he arrived as part of an expedition to German New Guinea, which was then a protectorate of the German Reich. Koch serially examined the Papuan people, the indigenous inhabitants, and their blood samples and noticed they contained Plasmodium parasites, the cause of malaria, but their bouts of malaria were mild or could not even be noticed, i.e., were subclinical. On the contrary, German settlers and Chinese workers, who had been brought to New Guinea, fell sick immediately. The longer they had stayed in the country, however, the more they too seemed to develop a resistance against it.

=== Koch's postulates ===
During his time as government advisor, Koch published a report on how he discovered and experimentally showed the tuberculosis bacterium as the pathogen of tuberculosis. He described the importance of pure cultures in isolating disease-causing organisms and explained the necessary steps to obtain these cultures, methods which are summarized in Koch's four postulates. Koch's discovery of the causative agent of anthrax led to the formation of a generic set of postulates which can be used in the determination of the cause of most infectious diseases. These postulates, which not only outlined a method for linking cause and effect of an infectious disease but also established the significance of laboratory culture of infectious agents, became the "gold standard" in infectious diseases.

Although Koch worked out the principles, he did not formulate the postulates, which were introduced by his assistant Friedrich Loeffler. Loeffler, reporting his discovery of diphtheria bacillus in 1883, stated three postulates as follows:

1. The organism must always be present in every case of the disease, but not in healthy individuals.
2. The organism must be isolated from a diseased individual and grown in pure culture.
3. The pure culture must cause the same disease when inoculated into a healthy, susceptible individual.

The fourth postulate was added by an American plant pathologist Erwin Frink Smith in 1905, and is stated as:

4. The same pathogen must be isolated from the experimentally infected individuals.

== Personal life ==
Robert Koch with his wife in Japan, 1908.

In July 1867, Koch married Emma (Emmy) Adolfine Josephine Fraatz, and the two had a daughter, Gertrude, in 1868. Their marriage ended after 26 years in 1893, and later that same year, he married actress Hedwig Freiberg (1872–1945).

On 9 April 1910, Koch suffered a heart attack and never made a complete recovery. On 27 May, three days after giving a lecture on his tuberculosis research at the Prussian Academy of Sciences, Koch died in Baden-Baden at the age of 66. Following his death, the Institute named its establishment after him in his honour. He was irreligious.

== Honours and legacy ==
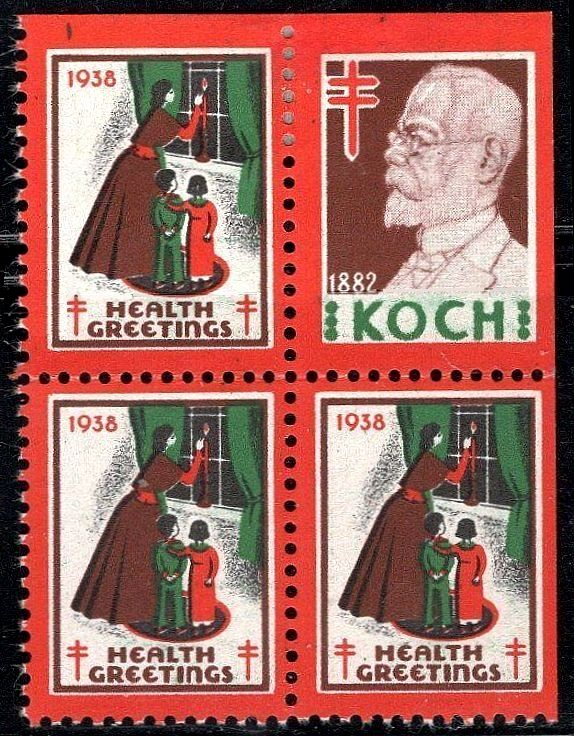
In 1938 the National Tuberculosis Association paid tribute to Koch and issued a U.S. Christmas Seal. Christmas seals were and continue to be sold as a way of raising funds to fight tuberculosis.

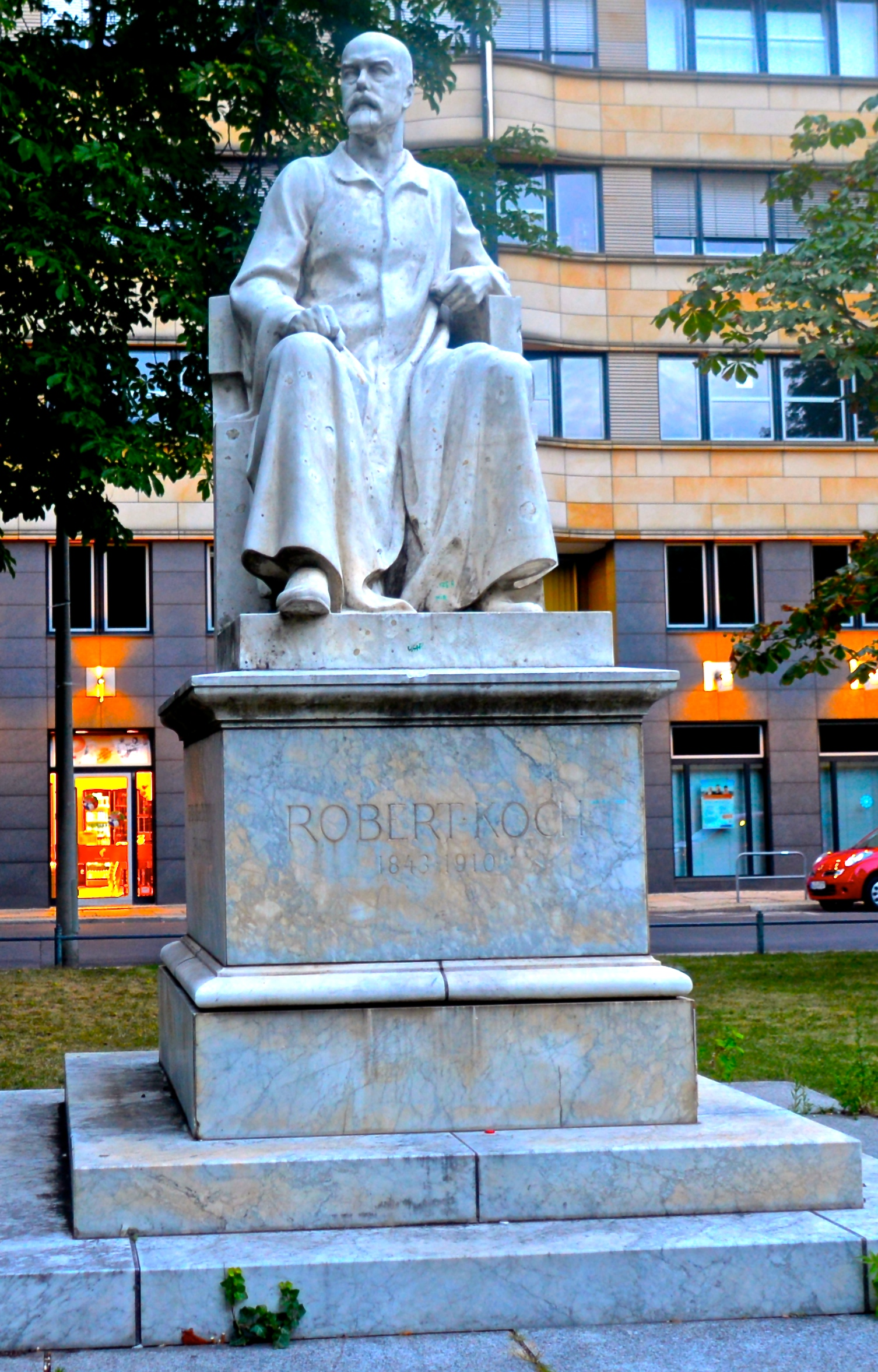
Statue of Koch at Robert-Koch-Platz (Robert Koch square) in Berlin

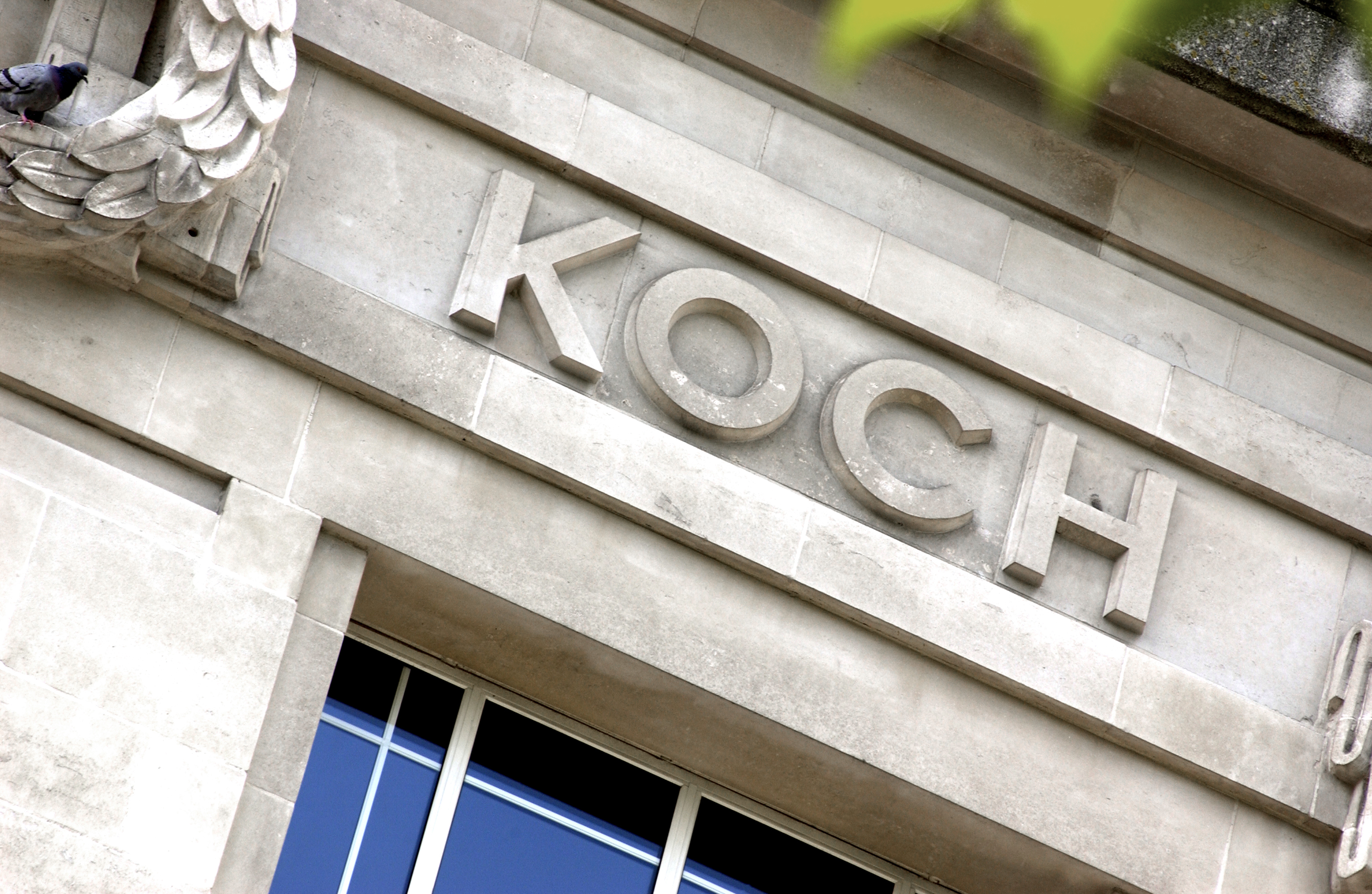
Koch's name as it appears on the LSHTM frieze in Keppel Street, Bloomsbury, London

Koch was made a Knight Grand Cross in the Prussian Order of the Red Eagle on 19 November 1890, and was elected a Foreign Member of the Royal Society (ForMemRS) in 1897. In 1905, he was awarded the Nobel Prize in Physiology and Medicine "for his investigations and discoveries in relation to tuberculosis." In 1906, research on tuberculosis and tropical diseases won him the Order Pour le Merite and in 1908, the Robert Koch Medal, established to honour the greatest living physicians. Emperor Wilhelm I awarded him the Order of the Crown, 100,000 marks and appointment as Privy Imperial Councillor, Surgeon-General of Health Service, and Fellow of the Science Senate of Kaiser Wilhelm Society.

Koch established the Royal Prussian Institute for Infectious Diseases in Berlin in 1891. After his death, it was renamed Robert Koch Institute in his honour.

The World Health Organization has observed "World Tuberculosis Day" every 24 March since 1982 to commemorate the day Koch discovered the tuberculosis bacterium.

Koch's name is one of 23 from the fields of hygiene and tropical medicine featured on the frieze of the London School of Hygiene & Tropical Medicine building in Keppel Street, Bloomsbury.

A large marble statue of Koch stands in a small park known as Robert Koch Platz, just north of the Charity Hospital, in the Mitte section of Berlin. His life was the subject of a 1939 German-produced motion picture that featured Oscar-winning actor Emil Jannings in the title role.

Koch and his relationship to Paul Ehrlich, who developed a mechanism to diagnose TB, were portrayed in the 1940 movie Dr. Ehrlich's Magic Bullet.

On 10 December 2017, Koch's birthday, he was celebrated in a Google Doodle.

== Controversies ==
=== Louis Pasteur ===
At their first meeting at the Seventh International Medical Congress in London in August 1881, Koch and Pasteur were friendly towards each other. But the rest of their careers followed with scientific disputes. The conflict started when Koch interpreted his discovery of anthrax bacillus in 1876 as causality, that is, the germ caused the anthrax infections. Although his postulates were not yet formulated, he did not establish the bacterium as the cause of the disease: it was an inference. Pasteur therefore argued that Koch's discovery was not the full proof of causality, but Pasteur's anthrax vaccine developed in 1881 was. Koch published his conclusion in 1881 with a statement: "anthrax never occurs without viable anthrax bacilli or spores. In my opinion no more conclusive proof can be given that anthrax bacilli are the true and only cause of anthrax," and that vaccination such as claimed by Pasteur would be impossible. To prove his vaccine, Pasteur sent his assistant Louis Thuillier to Germany for demonstration and disproved Koch's idea. They had a heated public debate at the International Congress for Hygiene in Geneva in 1882, where Koch criticised Pasteur's methods as "unreliable," and claimed they "are false and [as such ] they inevitably lead to false conclusions." Koch later continued to attack Pasteur, saying, "Pasteur is not a physician, and one cannot expect him to make sound judgments about pathological processes and the symptoms of disease."

=== Tuberculin ===
When Koch discovered tuberculin in 1890 as a medication for tuberculosis, he kept the experiment secret and avoided disclosing the source. It was only after a year under public pressure that he publicly announced the experiment and the source. Clinical trials with tuberculin were disastrous and complete failures. Rudolf Virchow's autopsy report of 21 subjects treated with tuberculin to the Berlin Medical Society on 7 January 1891 revealed that instead of healing tuberculosis, the subjects died because of the treatment. One week later, Koch publicised that the drug was a glycerine extract of a pure cultivation of the tuberculosis bacilli. The German official report in late 1891 declared that tuberculosis was not cured with tuberculin. From this moment onwards, Koch's prestige fell apart. The reason for his initial secrecy was due to an ambition for monetary benefits for the new drug, and with that establishment of his own research institute. Since 1885, he had tried to leave government service and create an independent state-run institute of his own. Following the disappointment, he was released from the University of Berlin and forced to work as Director of the Royal Prussian Institute for Infectious Diseases, a newly established institute, in 1891. He was prohibited from working on tuberculin and from claiming patent rights in any of his subsequent works.

=== Human and cattle tuberculosis ===
Koch initially believed that human (Mycobacterium tuberculosis) and cattle tuberculosis bacilli (now called Mycobacterium bovis) were different pathogens when he made the discovery in 1882. Two years later, he revoked that position and asserted that the two bacilli were the same type. This later assumption was taken as a fact in veterinary practice. Based on it, legislations were made in the US for the inspection of meat and milk. In 1898, an American veterinarian Theobald Smith published a detailed comparative study and found that the tuberculosis bacteria are different based on their structure, growth patterns, and pathogenicity. In addition, he also discovered that there were variations in each type. In his conclusion, he made two important points:

1. Human tuberculosis bacillus cannot infect cattle.
2. But cattle bacillus may infect humans since it is very pathogenic.

By that time, there was evidence that cattle tuberculosis was transmitted to humans through meat and milk. Upon these reports, Koch conceded that the two bacilli were different but still advocated that cattle tuberculosis was of no health concern. Speaking at the Third International Congress on Tuberculosis, held in London in July 1901, he said that cattle tuberculosis is not dangerous to humans and there is no need for medical attention. He said, "I therefore consider it unnecessary to take any measures against this form of TB. The fight against TB clearly has to concentrate on the human bacillus." Chair of the congress, Joseph Lister reprimanded Koch and explained the medical evidence of cattle tuberculosis in humans.

=== 1902 Nobel Prize ===
The Nobel Committee selected the 1902 Nobel Prize in Physiology or Medicine to be awarded for the discovery of the transmission of malaria. But it could not make the final decision on whom to give it to — the British surgeon Ronald Ross or the Italian biologist Giovanni Battista Grassi. Ross had discovered that the human malarial parasite was carried by certain mosquitoes in 1897, and the next year that bird malaria could be transmitted from infected to healthy birds by the bite of a mosquito. Grassi had discovered Plasmodium vivax and the bird malaria parasite, and towards the end of 1898 the transmission of Plasmodium falciparum between humans through mosquitoes Anopheles claviger. To the surprise of the Nobel Committee, the two nominees exchanged polemic arguments against each other publicly justifying the importance of their own works. Robert Koch was then appointed as a "neutral arbitrator" to make the final decision. To his disadvantage, Grassi had criticised Koch on his malaria research in 1898 during an investigation of the epidemic, while Ross had established a cordial relationship with Koch. Ross was selected for the award, as Koch "threw the full weight of his considerable authority in insisting that Grassi did not deserve the honour".

== See also ==
- Robert Koch Institute
