= Fanny Hesse =

German biologist (1850–1934)

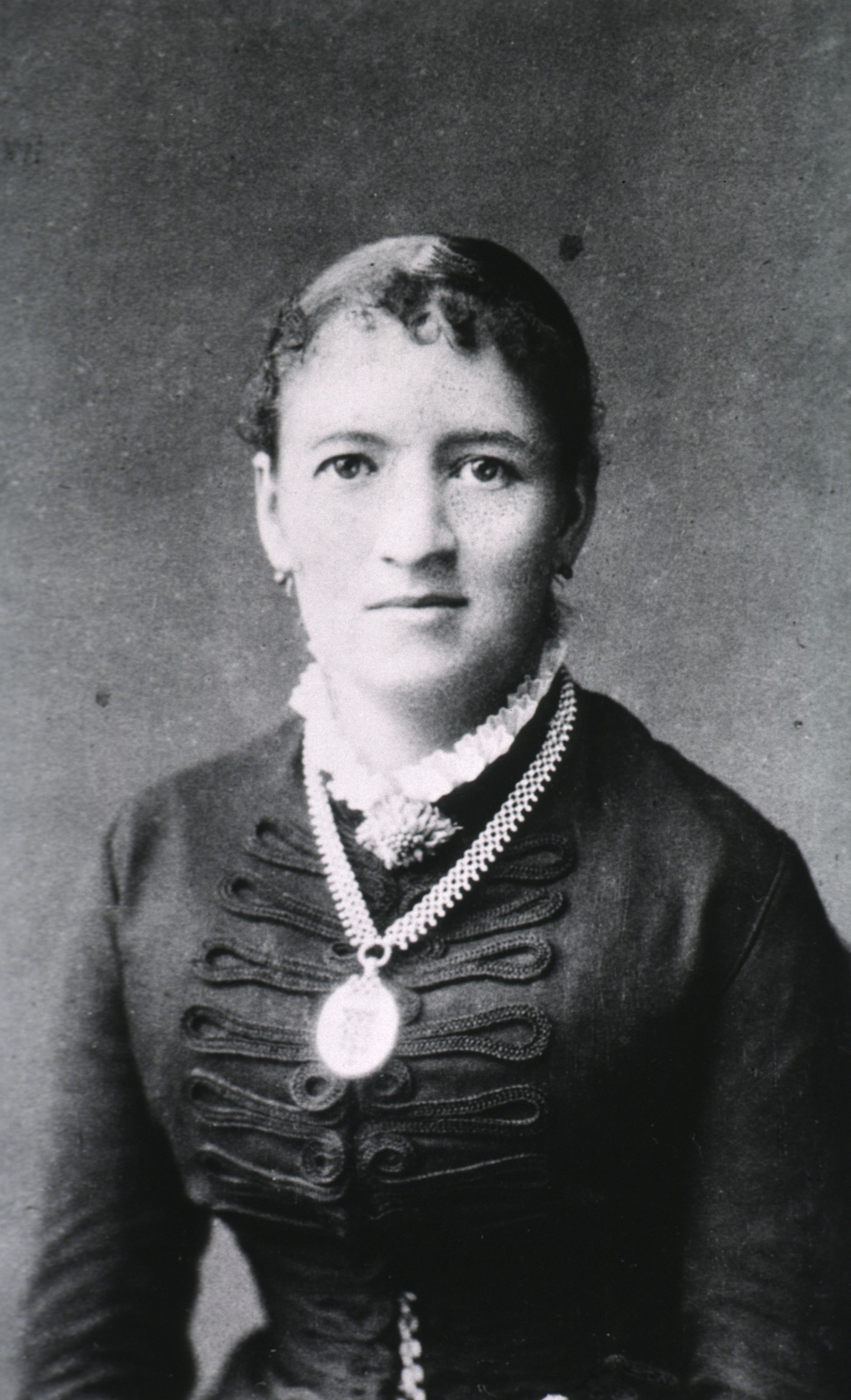
Fanny Hesse, c. 1883

Fanny Hesse (born Angelina Fanny Eilshemius, June 22, 1850 – December 1, 1934) is best known for her work in microbiology alongside her husband, Walther Hesse. Following her initial suggestion of using agar as an alternative to gelatin, they were instrumental in pioneering agar's usage as a common gelling agent for producing media capable of culturing microorganisms at high temperatures.

== Biography ==
=== Early life and childhood ===
Hesse was born in 1850 in New York City to Gottfried Eilshemius, a wealthy import merchant, and his wife, Cécile Elise (née Robert). Her family is of Dutch descent, originating near Emden, Frisia. Hesse was the oldest of ten children, five of whom died early on in their lives, and they were raised at Laurel Hill Manor in North Arlington, New Jersey. She and her sisters learned about cooking and housekeeping from their mother beginning at an early age. At the age of 15, she attended a finishing school in Switzerland to study French and home economics.

=== Later life and family ===
Hesse was first introduced to her husband and research partner, Walther Hesse, through an introduction by his brother Richard whilst he was visiting New York. Fanny Hesse then met Walther again in 1872 while traveling in Germany with her sister Eugenie. The couple engaged in 1873 and married in 1874 with a wedding held in Geneva. Shortly afterwards, the couple began to reside in the Erzgebirge mountain range due to Walther Hesse's work in nearby uranium mines as a doctor. She and her family would later live in Strehlen, a suburb of Dresden, as a result of Walther purchasing a house to work from home at during his time at the Technical University of Dresden. Referred to as Lina in her family, Hesse and her husband had three sons. Hesse and her brother Louis Eilshemius both shared an early interest and talent for painting and illustrations, with Louis earning some fame for his work later on in his life.

Hesse would end up outliving her husband by 23 years, and her illustrations and Walther's papers have been passed down to her grandchildren as part of her personal collection. Following Walther's death, she moved into the town to be closer to her family and children for the remainder of her life. During World War I, the Hesse family home in New Jersey was sold and her part of the inheritance was kept as enemy property. It was not until many years later that she began to receive small sums of money and other items included with her inheritance, in addition to the pension she received as a widow of a civil servant. However, as her home in Dresden was destroyed during Allied air raids, many of the Hesse family mementos have been lost aside from those that Hesse managed to collect from family members.

== Research contributions ==
=== Laboratory assistance ===
In addition to her housekeeping duties, Hesse worked in an unpaid capacity to assist her husband by preparing bacterial growth media, cleaning equipment, and producing illustrations for scientific publications. Hesse became familiar with her husband's work over time. She also performed a role as a scientific illustrator, drawing highly accurate watercolor images of colonies of fungi and bacteria on solid growth media, and her illustrations were included in her husband's work that was published in 1884. Hesse helped to coat test tubes with gelatin for her husband to use in growing microorganisms before they discovered that gelatin easily melted on warm days, destroying some of the bacteria. In addition to these technical duties, she used her artistic abilities to draw pictures of bacterial colonies as viewed under a microscope in the different phases of bacteria growth to use in her husband's journal publications. At the time of her recommendation for agar as a plating medium, Hesse was also helping her husband culture air-borne bacteria.

=== Suggestion of agar ===
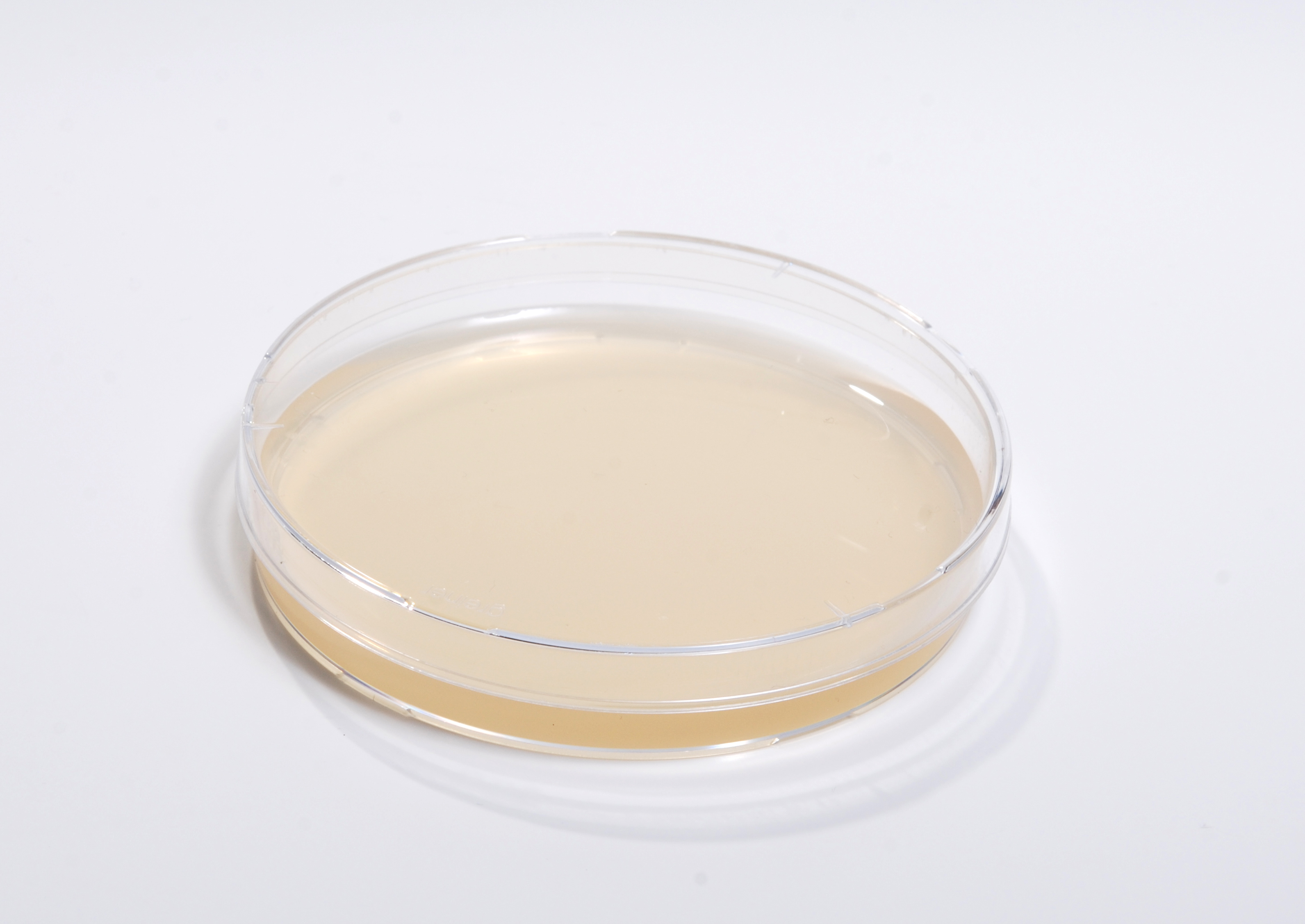
An agar plate for laboratory use

In 1881, while her husband was working in the laboratory of German physician and microbiologist Robert Koch, he struggled with performing experiments on gelatin medium that liquified due to gelatin-liquefying organisms and temperature increases during incubation. According to one source, Hesse suggested to her husband, Walther, the use of agar in his experiments. Before the suggestion to use agar, Walter Hesse and Koch had attempted using potato slices as a medium to culture pure colonies. Once this proved to be unsubstantial, they attempted utilizing a nutrient-rich gelatin media, which still did not provide adequate stability for producing cultures for examination.

Following unsuccessful attempts of culturing microorganisms on gelatin mediums, Hesse then suggested that agar was preferable to gelatin for cultivating bacteria and other microorganisms. She was aware of the properties of agar as a gelling agent, able to maintain its physical properties at warm temperatures, through her usage of it at home. Hesse had first learned about agar from her mother's friends that had lived in the East Indies, where the seaweed extract itself originates. Agar was first utilized in seaweed extracts in Japan, and it was later introduced to Europe by Dutch citizens in the East Indies for the creation of fruit jellies. She initially had been utilizing agar as a replacement for gelatin in dishes she prepared in her kitchen, finding agar more versatile in resisting summer temperatures for fruit jams and jellies, and subsequently suggested it as an alternative when Walther complained to her about gelatin breaking down in the summertime heat.

Hesse's suggestion led to Walther and Koch successfully using agar as a plating medium for cultivating the bacteria that caused tuberculosis. Hesse's suggestion of using agar also proved to be central to her husband's success in analyzing microbial counts in air, as he initially ran into problems with summertime temperatures liquefying the gelatin. Subsequent experiments following her suggestion of using agar as an alternative gelling agent revealed its advantages in thermal stability, resistance to liquifying bacterial enzymes, ability to maintain sterility, and benefits for long term storage, which rectified many of the problems associated with gelatin. In comparison to agar, which could remain solid at temperatures up to 90°C while settling at temperatures below 45°C, gelatin liquified at 37°C, which made it an unsuitable media to plate many types of bacteria in laboratory conditions. The agar "dessert medium" invented by Hesse, and that her husband Walther used to culture bacteria in his laboratory, had a percent composition of 1%–1.5%. The agar that Hesse popularized does not melt below 85°C and is often observed at 100°C. Agar-based mediums were capable of providing a firmer media at higher temperatures, which allowed for better plating and isolation of bacterial colonies in the conditions Walther and Koch performed their experiments in. Eventually, the agar media would be used by Julius Richard Petri in creating the Petri dish, a model of culture plates used in modern laboratory work.

In his paper on the etiology of tuberculosis, Robert Koch wrote: "The tubercle bacilli can also be cultured on other nutrient substrates, if the latter possess similar properties to the solidified serum. They are able to grow on a solidified gel which remains solid at incubator temperature, prepared by adding agar-agar to a meat infusion or peptone medium."

Although Koch mentioned in an 1882 paper on tuberculosis bacilli that he used agar, he did not credit Hesse. At the time, Koch did not recognize yet the importance of agar. Later on in her life, she chose to keep and take care of all of her illustrations and Walther's papers and documents, out of respect for Walther's work and her own contributions to his discoveries. The Hesses chose to not exploit their contributions with agar commercially, citing the action as improper conduct. Hesse's contribution never resulted in financial benefit for the Hesse family, but continues to remain central to the fields of microbiology and bacteriology in regards to laboratory techniques for producing plating media.

== See also ==
- Walther Hesse
- Robert Koch
