= Walther Hesse =

German microbiologist (1846–1911)

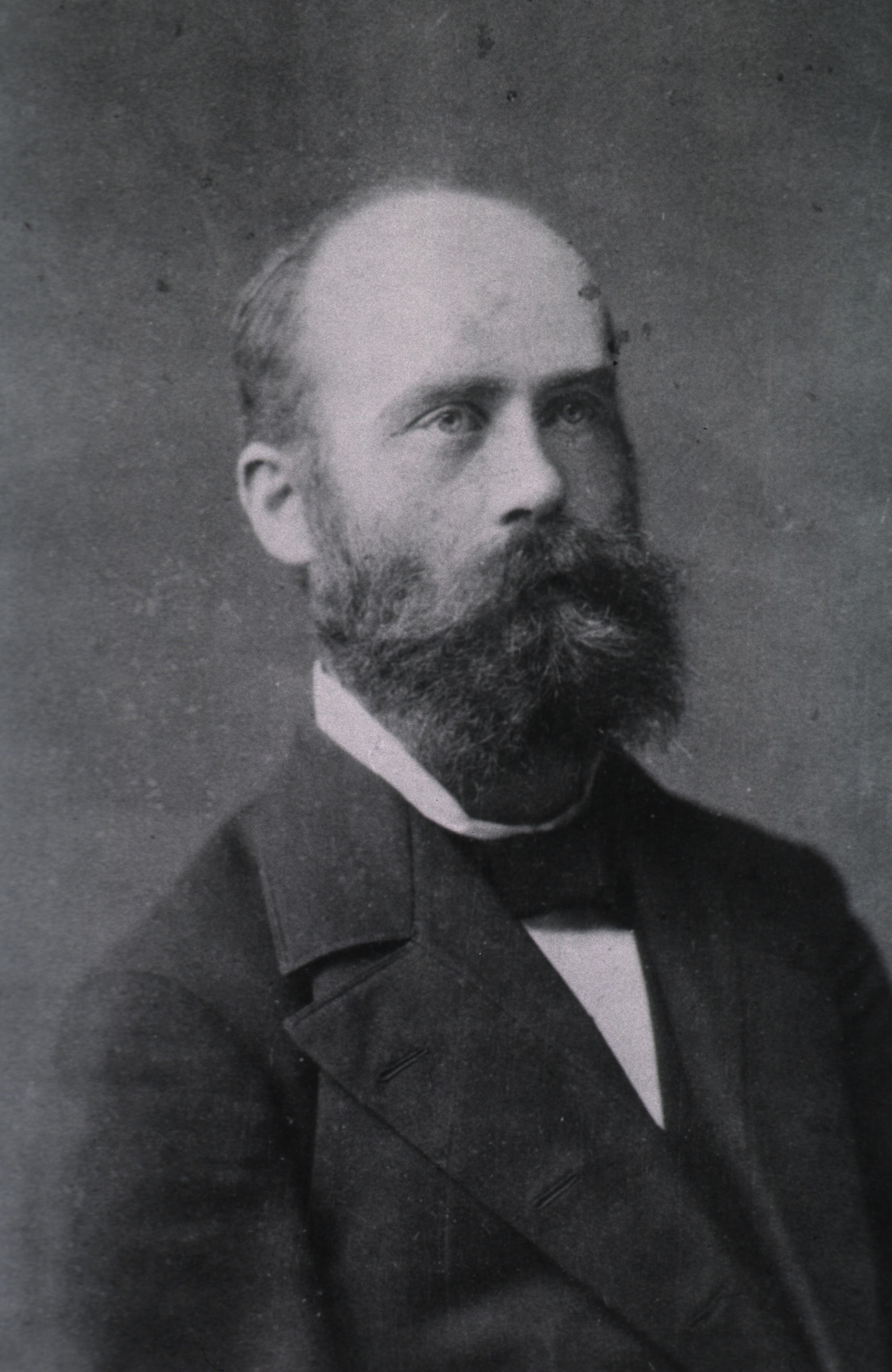
- Hesse ca. 1883
- Born: 27 December 1846; Bischofswerda, Lusatia
- Died: 19 July 1911 (aged 64)
- Education: University of Leipzig
- Known for: developing agar as a medium for culturing microorganisms
- Scientific career
- Fields: Microbiology
- Doctoral advisor: Ernst Leberecht Wagner

Walther Hesse (27 December 1846 – 19 July 1911) is best known for his work in microbiology, specifically his work with his wife Fanny Hesse in developing agar as a medium for culturing microorganisms.

== Biography ==
Hesse was born in Bischofswerda, Lusatia, as one of 12 children in the family of a medical practitioner. He attended the Kreuzschule in Dresden and studied medicine at the University of Leipzig with Ernst Leberecht Wagner from 1866 till 1870, when he received his doctorate in pathology. Afterwards he participated in the Franco-Prussian War, and therein in the Battle of Gravelotte.

As a ship's physician on the New York Line 1872/73 he examined seasickness – his works were classified by Prof. Gavingel of Le Havre as the first scientific study on this topic at all. In New York City, Hesse met his later wife Angelina Fanny Eilshemius whose brother Louis Eilshemius is known as an important painter as well. The Eilshemius family were immigrants of Dutch-German origin. Walther and Angelina married 1874 in Geneva, together with Angelina's sister and a nephew of Louis Agassiz.

== Investigations into lung disease of miners ==
After some years as a medical practitioner in Pirna and Zittau, Hesse went to Schwarzenberg, Saxony in 1877. His investigations in Schneeberger Bergkrankheit, responsible for the commonly early death of miners in the Ore Mountains, are credited as the first unveiling of working conditions as cause of an interior disease (lung cancer). Within his time in Schwarzenberg, he took a year with Max Joseph von Pettenkofer at Munich to deepen his knowledge in occupational hygiene.

== Work with Robert Koch ==
Hesse joined Robert Koch's laboratory (effectively in a post-doctoral position) in 1881 to study air quality. He was convinced that microorganisms were present everywhere, even in water and in the air. He used a series of filters, made mainly from wadding, in attempts to capture and observe microorganisms. When culturing the organisms he trapped with his filter, he used a gelatin-containing medium capable of solidifying. Frustratingly, the medium had a tendency to melt during the summer months, thus ruining the experiments. Additionally, many of the organisms he cultured were capable of degrading the gelatin medium, also ruining his experiments.

Hesse's wife, Angelina Fannie, noticed that the jams and jellies that she made using agar-agar did not melt in the hot summer weather. She had learned its use from a Dutch neighbor who had lived on the island of Java, in the Dutch East Indies(Indonesia). Hesse found that the mixture of nutrients and agar-agar remained solid up to 140 degrees Fahrenheit, and passed the recipe on to Koch who used it successfully in his work. Further development of agar showed that it would not easily melt (though would remain molten at lower temperatures once it did), was not easily degraded by microorganisms and was a flexible medium. Koch was soon using the new medium to grow tuberculosis bacteria.

== Later work ==
In later years, Hesse was district physician in Dresden. He continued his scientific works, experimented with Petri dishes and investigated the microbiological foundations of typhus, cholera and diphtheria. He operated a laboratory at the Technical College Dresden together with Walther Hempel. Hesse introduced pasteurization of milk in Pfund's dairy. The family's tomb at the cemetery of Serkowitz was created by Arnold Kramer.
