= Oluf L. Gamborg =

Plant cell biologist

Oluf L. Gamborg (1924–2007) was a plant cell biologist and a pioneer in the field of in vitro plant tissue culture

== Personal life and education ==
Gamborg was born in Denmark and moved to Chauvin, Alberta, in 1949 at the age of 22. He received his B.Sc. in agriculture in 1956 and a M.Sc. in plant biochemistry in 1958 at the University of Alberta, Edmonton. He continued his graduate studies at the University of Saskatchewan where he obtained a PhD in biochemistry in 1962.

== Career ==
After his graduation Gamborg joined the Prairie Regional Laboratory (PRL) (now Plant Biotechnology Institute) of the National Research Council of Canada in Saskatoon working on plant cell suspension cultures and the nutritional requirements for such cultures. As result of his research activities for the initiation and growth of soybean (Glycine max) cell suspensions in 1968 he developed a foundational plant tissue culture medium that has since become one of the most widely used media for in vitro biology plant studies (Gamborg's B5 medium). From Canada, he moved to the USA, where he initially consulted for various biotechnology companies. He then joined Colorado State University, serving as Associate Director and Research Coordinator for the "Plant Tissue Culture for Crops" project under the US Agency for International Development. This role involved conducting in vitro research on salt tolerance, organizing training courses, networking, and providing consultancy services in several developing countries. He received the Canadian Society of Plant Biologists (CSPB) Medal (The Gold Medal) in 1976 and the Lifetime Achievement Award from the Society for In Vitro Biology (SIVB) in 2005.

== Publications ==
As result of his research activities Gamborg published numerous peer reviewed papers and books covering different aspects of in vitro plant tissue culture. Gamborg cofounded together with Klaus Halbrock the Plant Cell Reports journal in 1981 and served as Co-Managing Editor for over 20 years.
