= Knickerbocker (Zamboanga) =

Filipino dessert

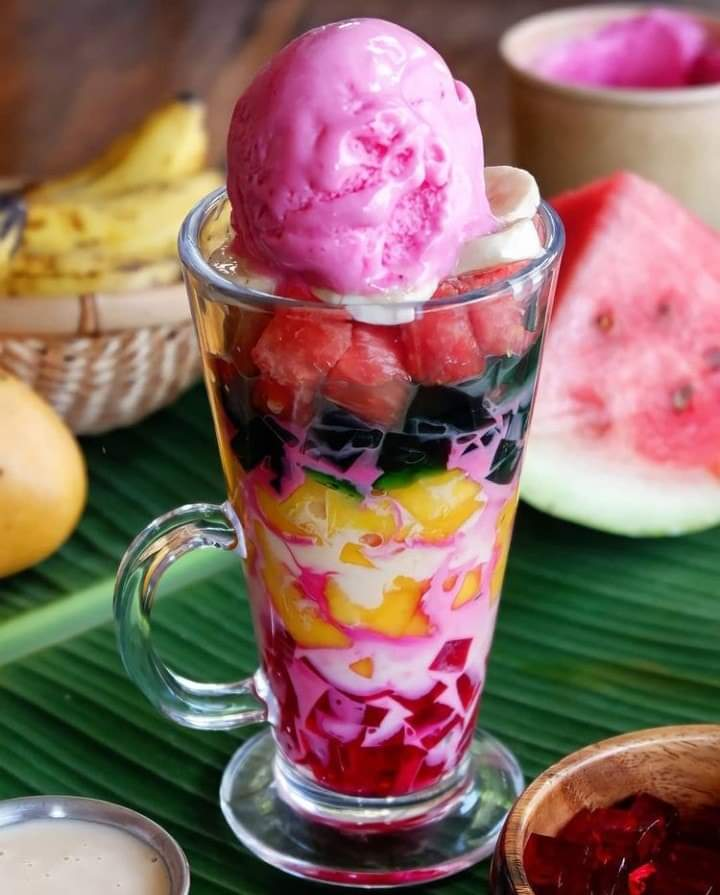
- Course: Dessert
- Place of origin: The Philippines
- Region or state: Zamboanga City
- Created by: Hacienda de Palmeras restaurant
- Main ingredients: Strawberry ice cream, condensed milk, gulaman (agar), nata de coco, various fruits

Knickerbocker is an ice cream sundae dessert from Zamboanga City, Philippines made with various fresh fruit chunks, flavored gulaman (agar) cubes, and nata de coco in condensed milk topped with strawberry ice cream. The fruits used include mangoes, bananas, dragon fruit, papaya, honeydew melon, apples, grapes, cherries, pineapple and watermelon among others. Sometimes vanilla or chocolate ice cream may be used. Nuts are also sometimes added. It has sometimes been regarded as a variant of halo-halo, but differs from it in that the knickerbocker does not contain shaved ice.

It is most similar to the American and British sundae dessert, a knickerbocker glory, from which it was derived but it has different ingredients. The dish was first popularized by the Hacienda de Palmeras, a restaurant, before spreading throughout the city.

== See also ==
- Buko salad
- Knickerbocker glory, an American and British sundae from which it is derived
- Halo-halo
- Ice buko
- Iskrambol
- Mais con hielo
- Saba con hielo
- Sorbetes
