= Avocado and milk in ice =

Filipino dessert

Avocado lamaw
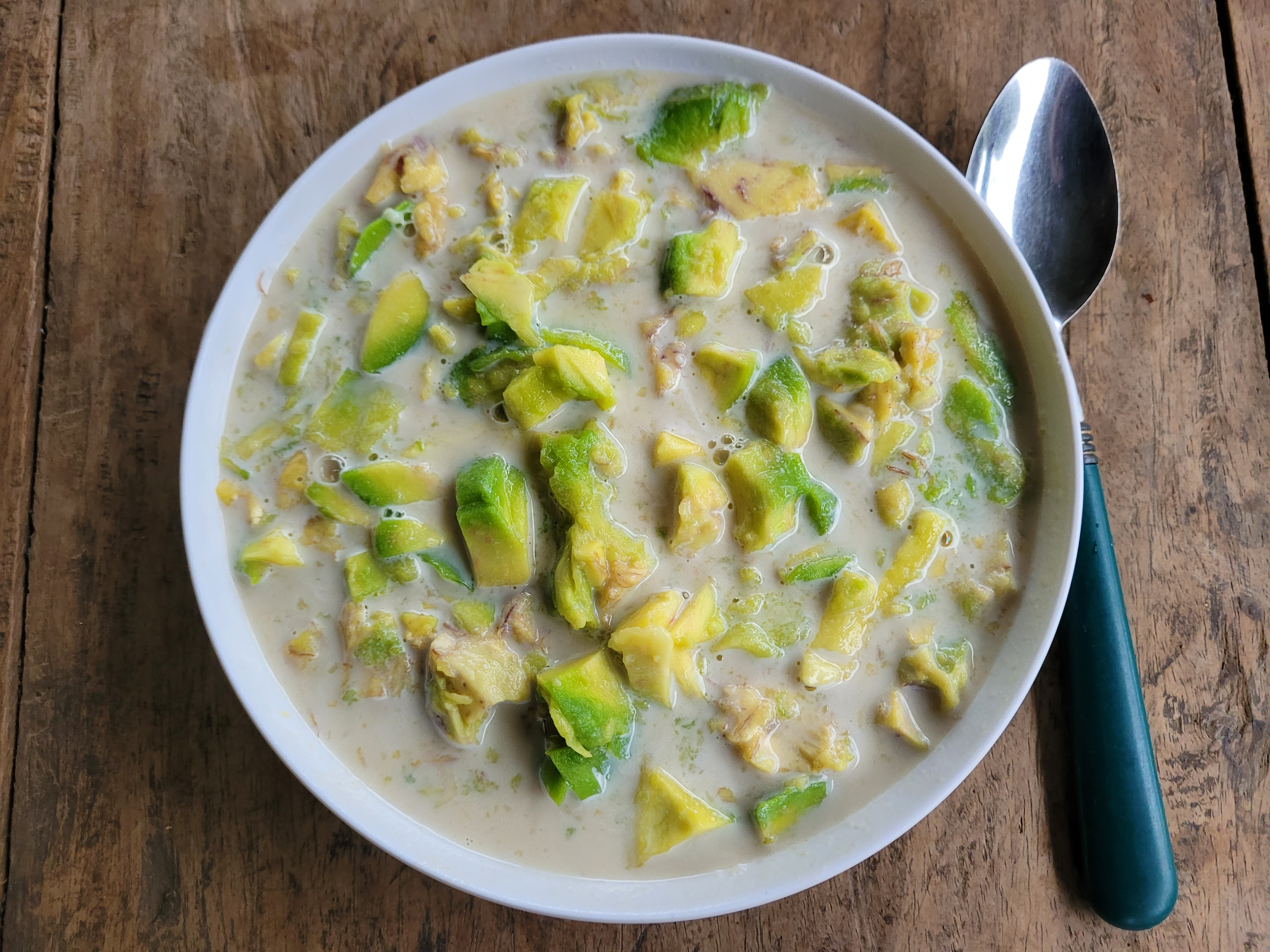
- Alternative names: abukado lamaw, nilamaw nga avocado, avocado milkshake, avocado con leche, milk avocado, avocado puree, avocado shake, avocado smoothie, avocado condensada
- Course: Dessert
- Place of origin: Philippines
- Serving temperature: Chilled, room temperature
- Main ingredients: Avocado, milk, sugar, ice

Avocado and milk in ice (or abukado lamaw) is a traditional Filipino dessert or beverage made from avocado in milk and sugar (condensed milk, evaporated milk, or powdered milk can also be used).

It is preferably eaten cold. Ice (shaved ice, crushed ice, or simply ice cubes) are added, or it is partly frozen before consumption. The milk can also be excluded, mixing avocados directly with sugar. The avocados can also be mashed or puréed, which is usually called avocado milkshake or avocado smoothie. Sliced dessert bananas are sometimes added.

Avocado lamaw is the traditional way of eating avocados in the Philippines, where avocados were introduced from Mexico before the 1700s, during the Spanish colonial period of the Philippines. Avocado lamaw is a variant of lamaw, a dessert made with young coconut, milk, and sugar.

It became a food trend on TikTok in 2022.

A similar avocado smoothie can be found in Vietnam, called sinh tố bơ.

== See also ==
- Buko pie
- Buko salad
- Halo-halo
- Ice buko
- Samalamig
