= Samalamig =

Filipino sweet-chilled beverages

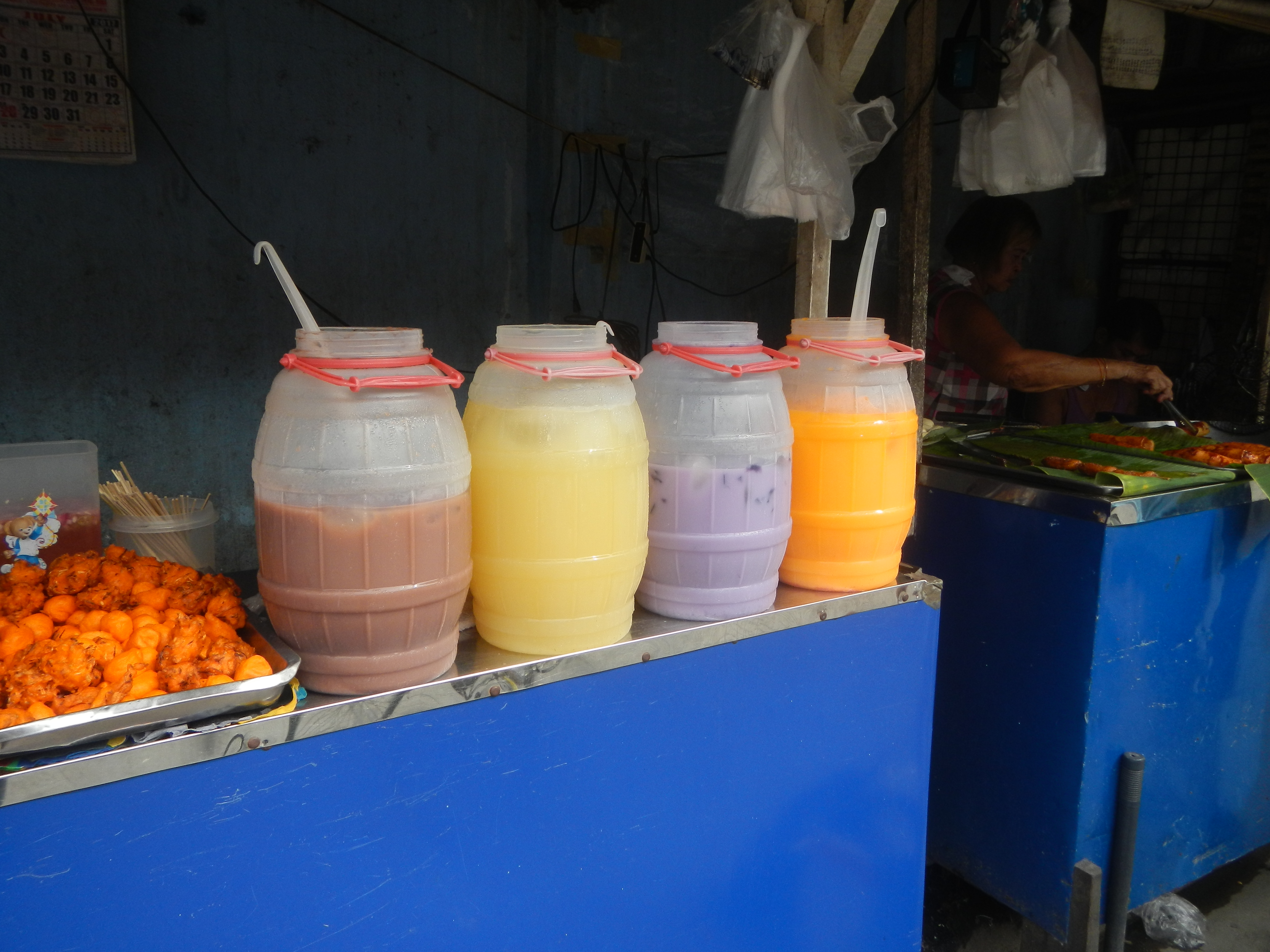
- Various types of samalamig sold by a street vendor in Malabon
- Type: Beverage
- Origin: The Philippines
- Ingredients: Various, see text

Samalamig, also known as palamig, is a collective term for various Filipino sweet chilled beverages that usually include jelly-like ingredients. They come in various flavors, and are commonly sold by street vendors as refreshments. Typical ingredients of the drinks include gulaman (agar), sago pearls, kaong, tapioca pearls, nata de coco, and coconut (including macapuno). They are usually anglicized as pearl coolers or pearl and jelly coolers.

Samalamig may also include various chilled fruit juices (usually with chunks of fruit), chocolate, and coffee drinks, regardless if jellies are added, that are also typically sold by samalamig vendors.

== Name ==
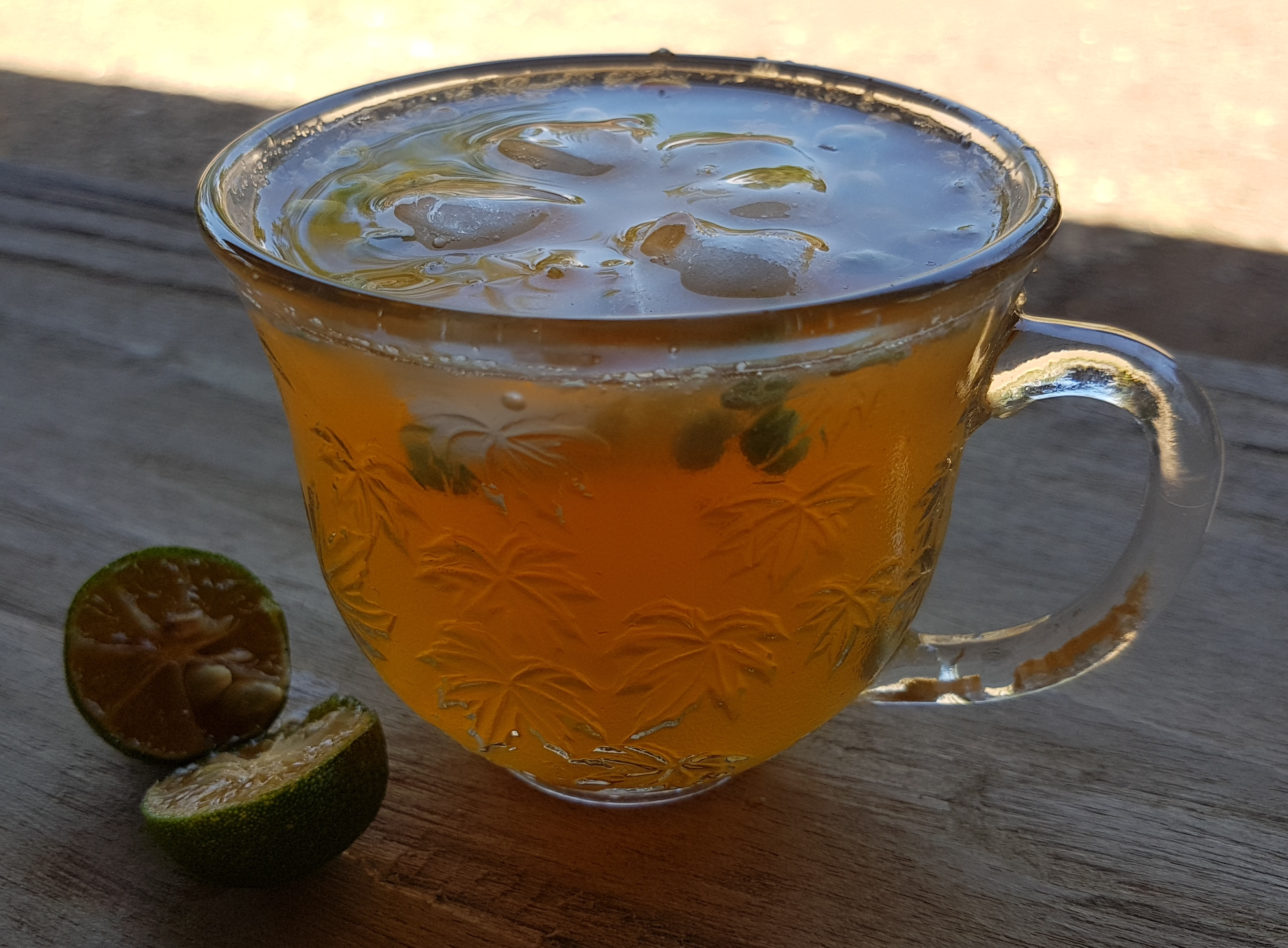
Calamansi juice

The name "samálamig" comes from sa, meaning "for; to; at", and malamíg, an adjective meaning "cold, chilly" in Tagalog. "Sa malamig" may thus loosely mean "for cold (drinks); at a cold place; chilled". "Sa malamig" might have come from the calls of ambulant vendors, telling people to come and get cold drinks, i.e. "[Dito] sa malamig", loosely "here for cold drinks". Thus, "sa malamig" could be taken as a qualifier for the various types of drinks stored in cold containers, i.e. buko juice is "buko sa malamig" and sago't gulaman is "sago't gulaman sa malamig", but these full phrases are no longer in habitual use. An alternate name is palamig which means "cooler" or "chiller".

== Description ==
Samalamig does not refer to a specific drink, but to a class of drinks that are served cold by street vendors. Thus they can come in a wide variety of flavors and types. They are traditionally sold by street vendors during summer months, but are now also offered by restaurants. The restaurant versions typically top the drinks with shaved ice.

== Types ==
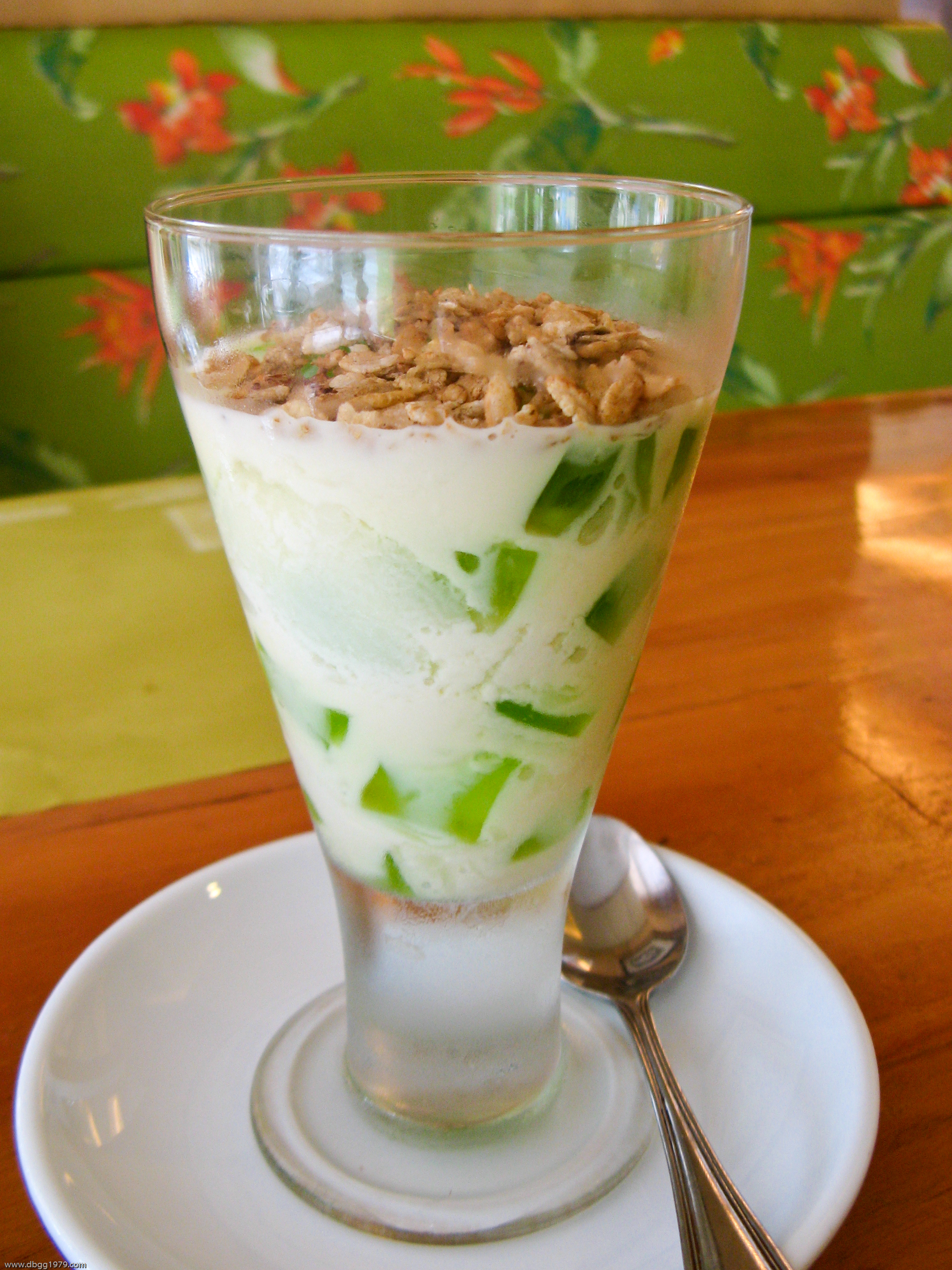
Buko pandan drink with pinipig

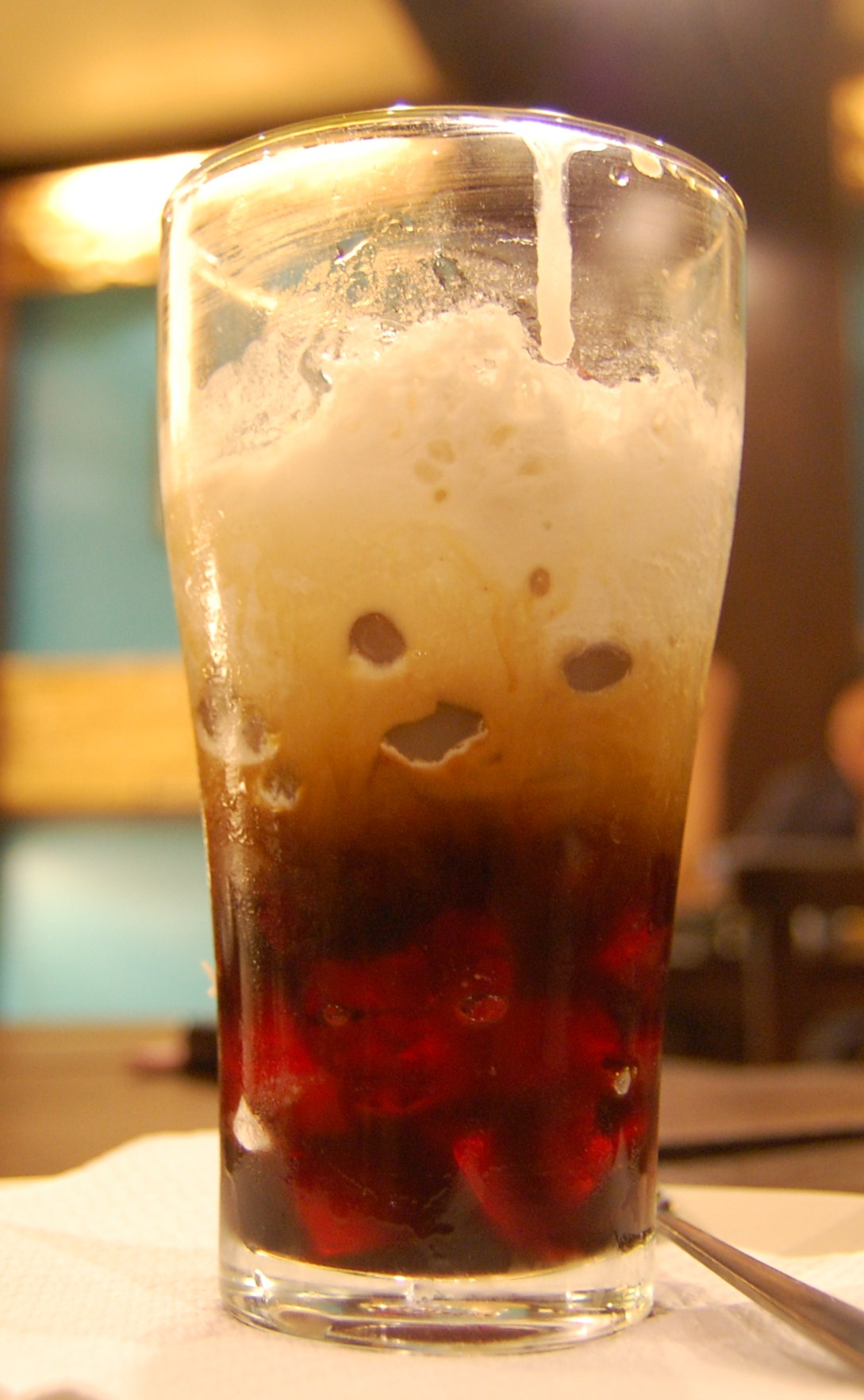
Guinomis

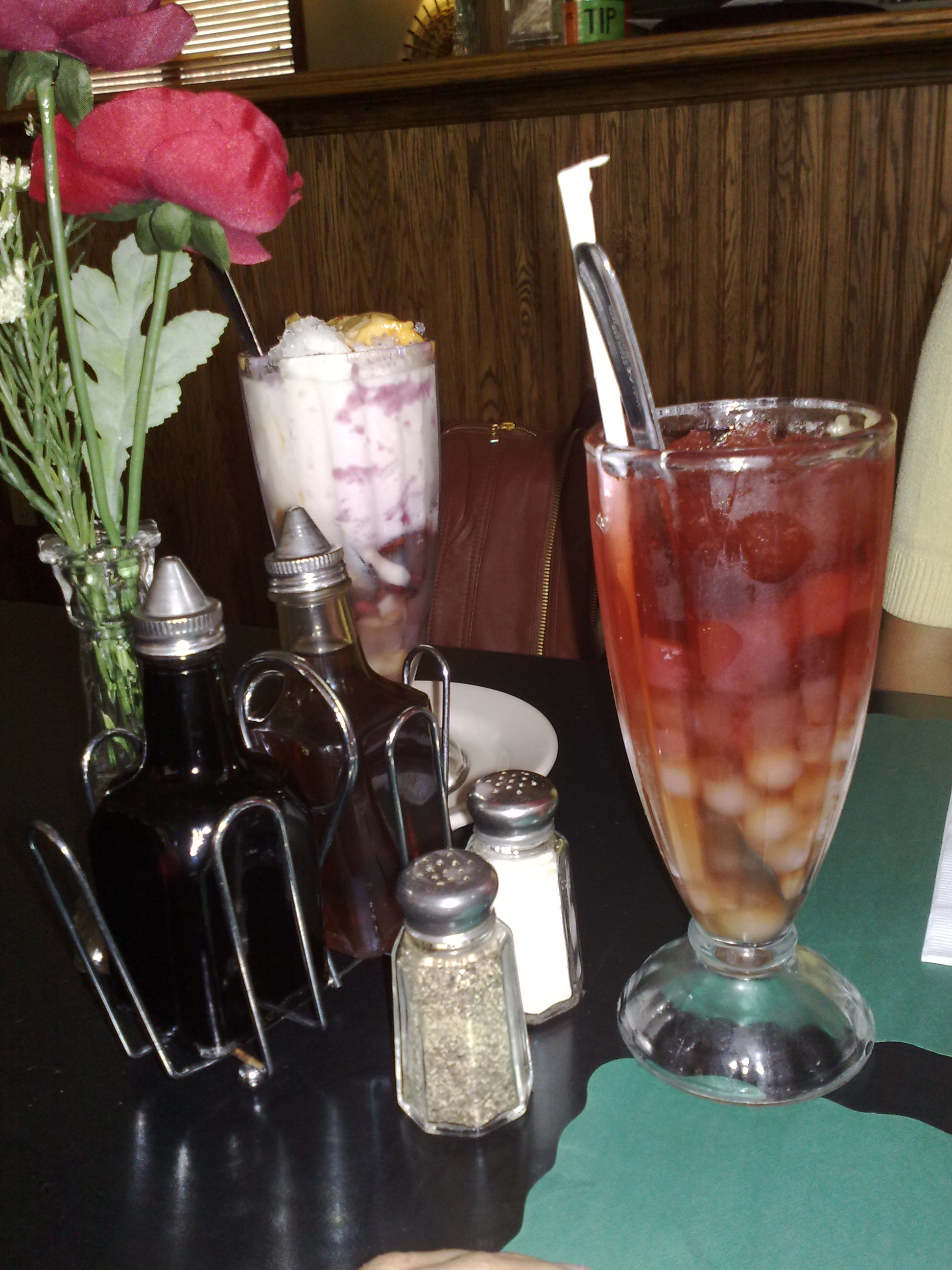
Sago at gulaman (foreground) and halo-halo

The main types of samalamig are listed below. The recipes however can be combined at the discretion of the maker. There are no set recipes for samalamig. The only common theme is that they are served cold with ice cubes or shaved ice. They also usually include jelly-like ingredients or pieces of fruit.

=== Buko juice ===
Buko juice is simple chilled coconut water, typically served with strips of coconut meat. It may or may not be sweetened. Some versions also add milk.

=== Buko pandan drink ===
Buko pandan refers to a very common flavor combination of coconut and pandan leaves in Filipino cuisine. When used alone, buko pandan typically refers to a type of dessert made with strips of coconut, pandan leaves, and various jellies in coconut milk. The drink version is the same, but is less thick and has more liquid. Like the dessert, the drink is characteristically light green in color from the pandan leaves, and the jellies used are usually dyed green.

=== Calamansi juice ===
Calamansi juice, also known as "Filipino lemonade", is the Filipino version of lemonade, made from the juice of fresh-squeezed calamansi sweetened with sugar or honey and chilled. It can also serve as a base for other types of samalamig if other fruits are added. Aside from its use in samalamig, calamansi juice by itself is a common drink in Filipino households. Unsweetened hot versions are a common home remedy for sore throat or colds. It can also be added to salabat (Filipino ginger tea).

=== Fruit salad drink ===
The fruit salad drink, also known as the "buko salad drink", is identical to the Filipino fruit salad, which is prepared with chunks of fruits, jellies, and coconut strips in condensed milk. The only difference is that the drink has more water and condensed milk added.

=== Guinomis ===
Guinomis is sometimes regarded as a variant of halo-halo since it is a shaved ice dessert. It is made with sago pearls, pinipig (toasted pounded rice), various jellies, and coconut milk on shaved ice. Like the halo-halo, it can have multiple variations. It originates from the Hiligaynon people.

=== Melon sa malamig ===
Melon sa malamig, sometimes called "melon chiller", "melon cooler", or simply "melon juice" is, at its most basic, pieces of cantaloupes mixed with sugar and water. Some recipes also add calamansi juice or evaporated or condensed milk. However, if it is made with milk, it must be consumed immediately, as proteolytic enzymes in the cantaloupe will break down the milk proteins and turn the drink bitter if left to stand.

=== Sago at gulaman ===
Sago at gulaman, commonly shortened to "sago't gulaman", "sago gulaman", or simply "gulaman", is the most common type of samalamig. The name means "sago and gulaman", referring to the main ingredients of the drink, sago pearls and gulaman jellies (agar). The drink is usually simply flavored with muscovado (or brown sugar), and pandan leaves. The pandan can also be substituted with vanilla or banana extract. Sago is also commonly substituted with tapioca pearls.

=== Sweet corn samalamig ===
Sweet corn samalamig is similar to maíz con hielo, but does not include shaved ice. It is made from sweet corn kernels in milk with jellies.

== See also ==
- Agua fresca
- Bilo-bilo
- Binignit
- Ginataang mais
- Lamaw
