= Iskrambol =

Filipino frozen dessert

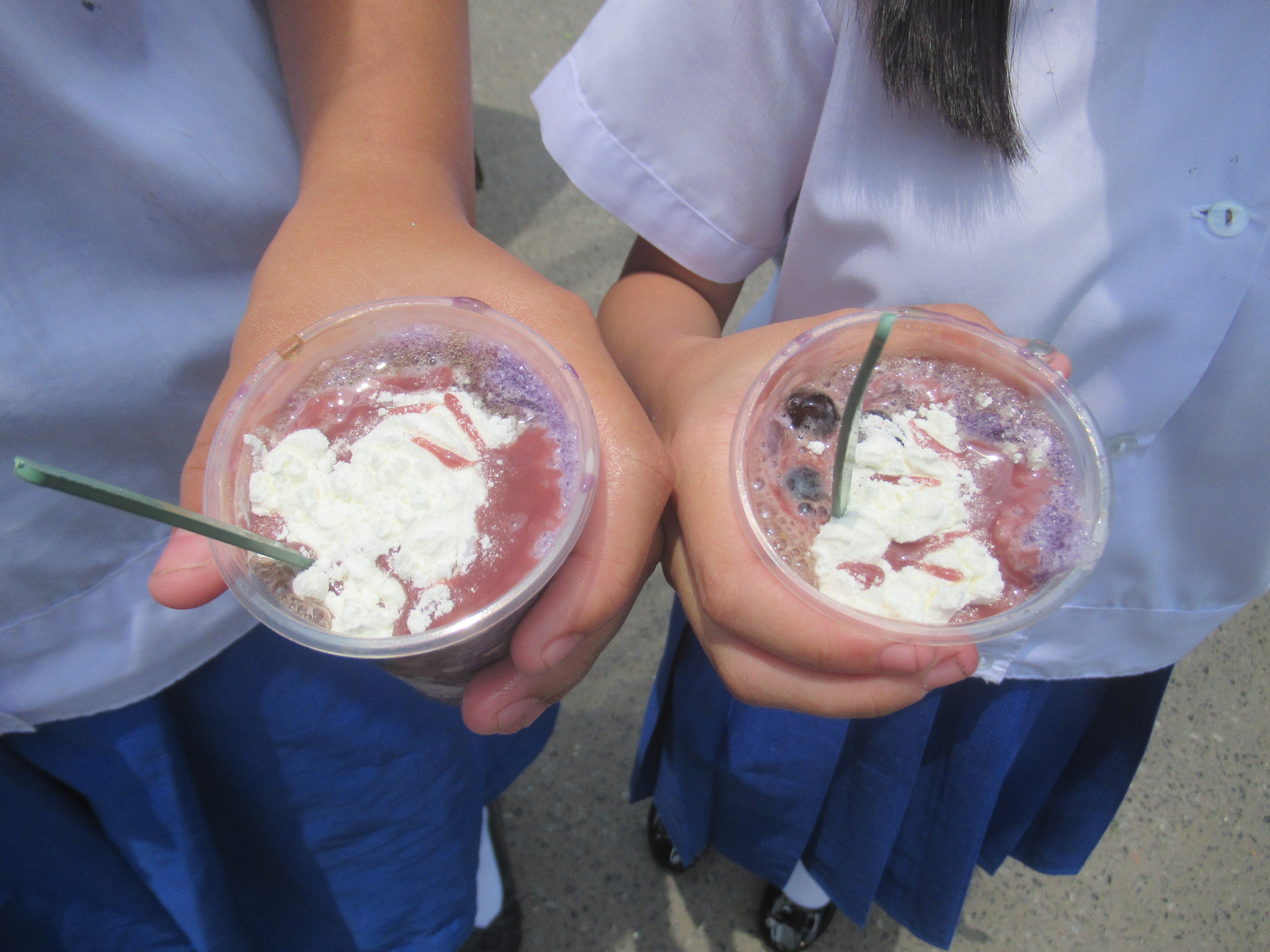
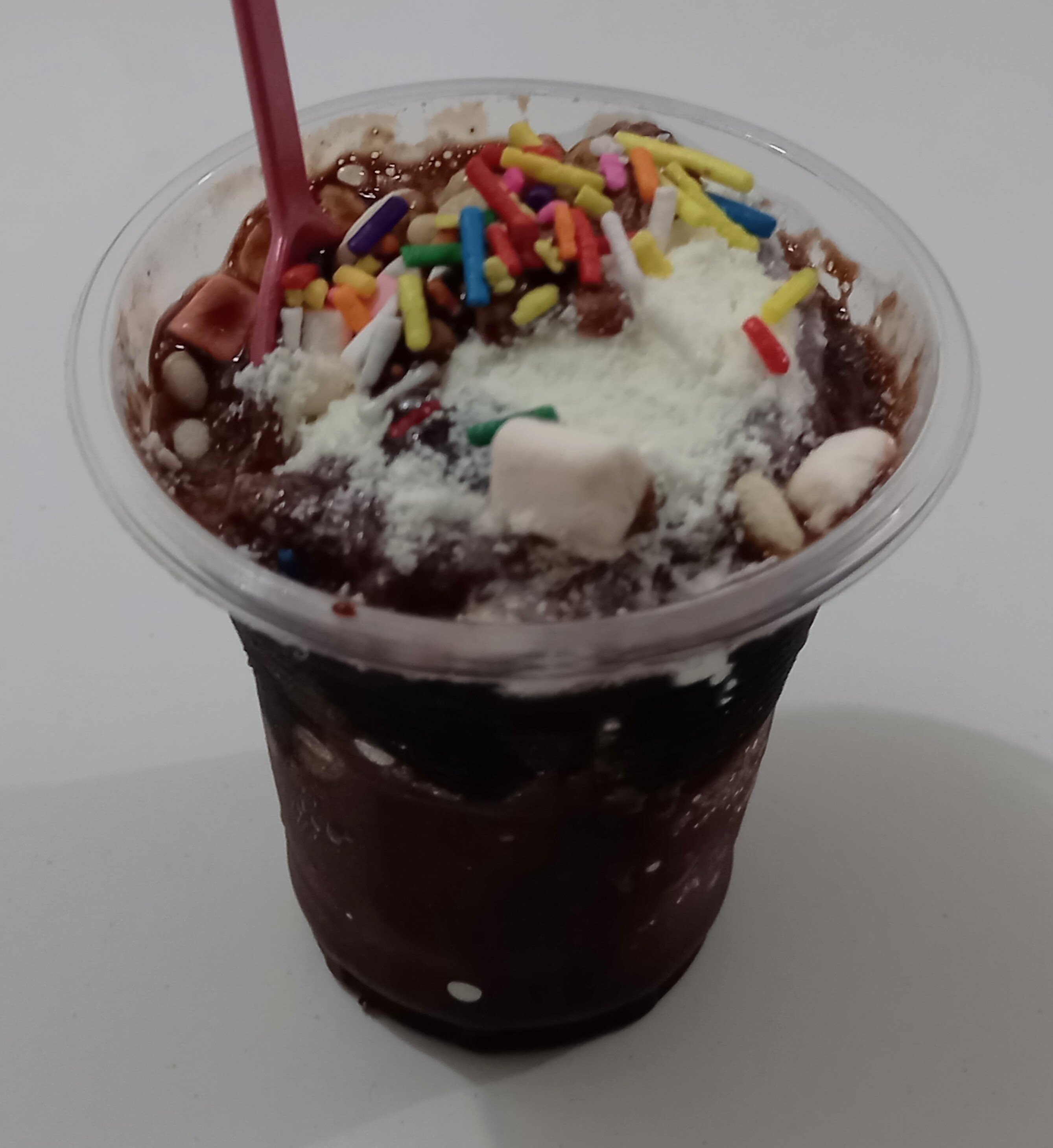
- Top: Classic Iskrambol, Bottom: Chocolate Iskrambol
- Alternative names: Ice scramble, scramble
- Course: Dessert
- Place of origin: Philippines
- Serving temperature: Cold
- Main ingredients: Shaved ice, banana extract, evaporated milk, sugar
- Variations: Chocolate, strawberry, ube

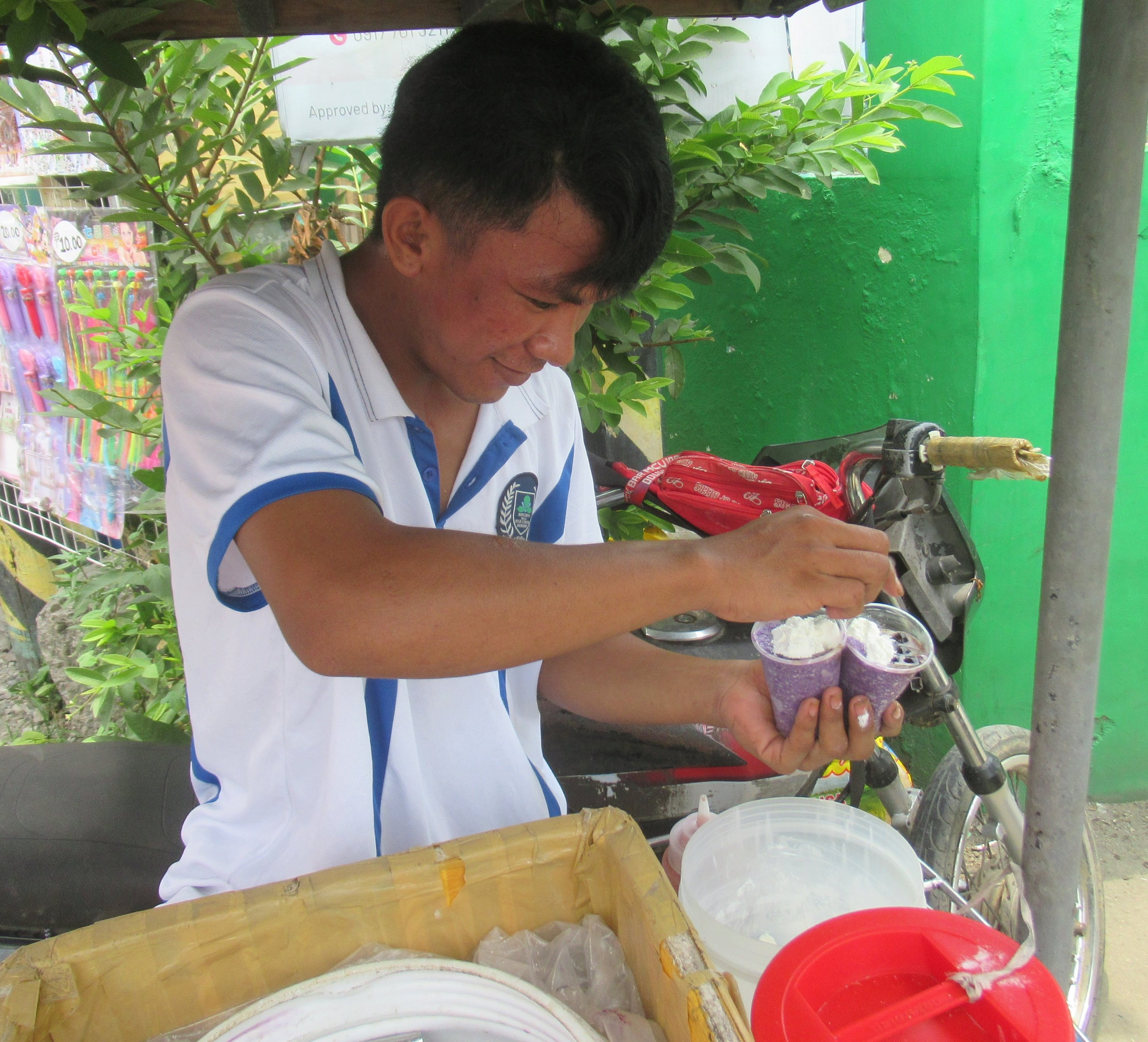
Shaved ice vendor

Iskrambol, also known as scramble or ice scramble, is a Filipino frozen dessert made from shaved ice with banana extract and evaporated milk with sugar or condensed milk. It is then topped with a variety of ingredients including powdered milk, marshmallows, strawberry syrup, chocolate syrup, pinipig, tapioca pearls, and sprinkles, among others. The banana extract-flavored dessert is characteristically dyed pink while other flavors may be dyed accordingly (e.g. dark brown from the chocolate syrup used in flavoring).

The spelling iskrambol is informal. It is merely a phonetic rendering of scramble through a Filipino English accent, with the initial "s-" sound unconsciously becoming "is-" due to influence from Spanish. The "is-" sound then gets hyper-corrected to ice scramble when rendering it back to an English spelling.

The "scramble" name of the dessert is derived from either the method of preparation of the dessert, wherein the ice, milk, and flavoring are mixed usually with a giant egg beater, or on the method of eating the dessert, wherein the ingredients are stirred (i.e. scrambled) with the use of the included straw or spoon.

The street dessert is a summer cooler with a fusion of shaved ice flavored with sweet and colorful treats. It is usually sold by street vendors and is a popular dessert among children for its bright colors and inexpensive cost. The classic Pinoy street food is available in different flavors like strawberry, chocolate, and ube.

In terms of taste and color, it is reminiscent and somewhat similar to the Thai Nom yen, made of Salak syrup.

== See also ==
- Buko salad
- Halo-halo
- Ice buko
- Lamaw
- Sorbetes
