= Knickerbocker glory =

Layered ice cream sundae

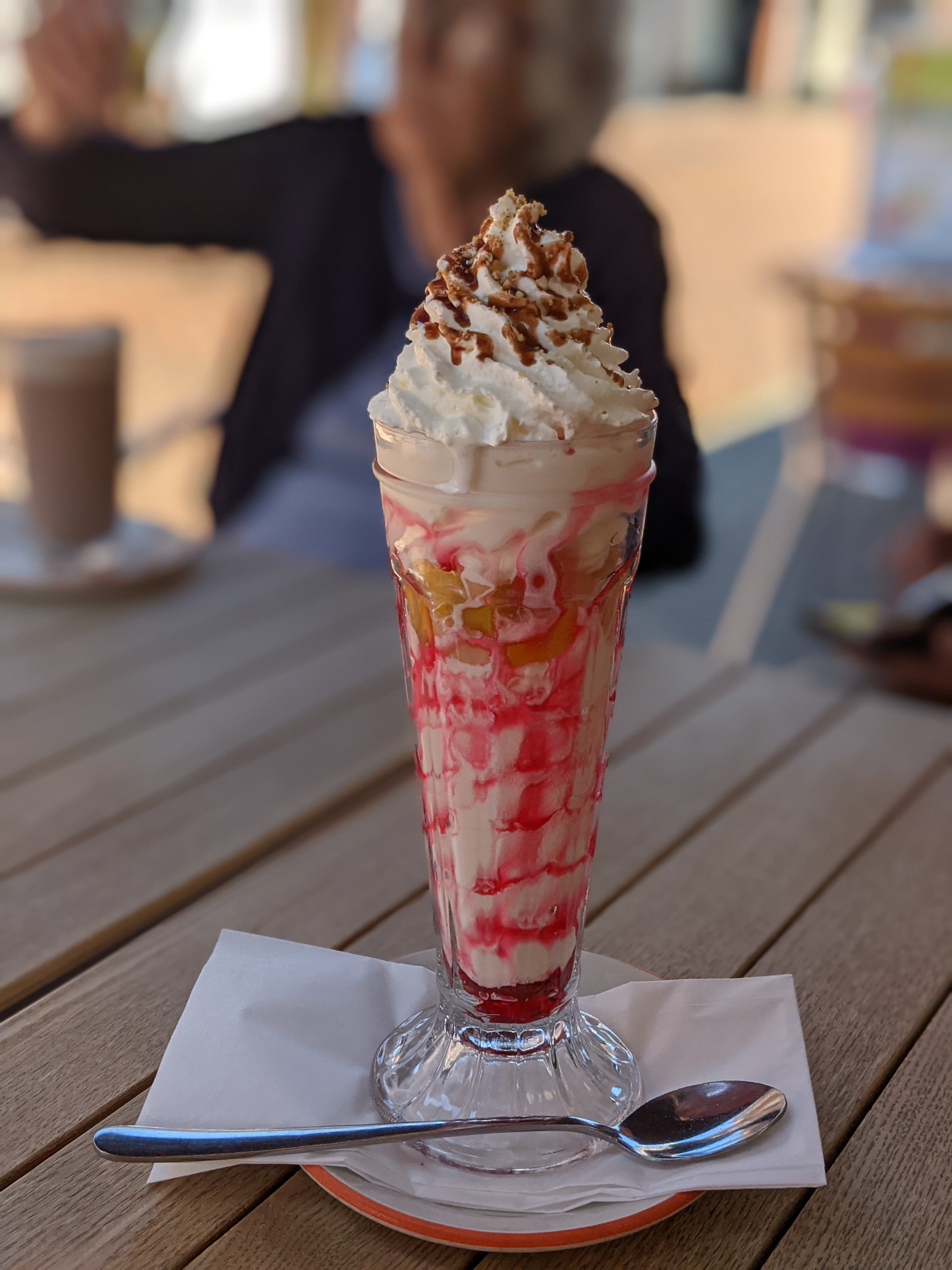
- Knickerbocker glory sundae
- Type: Ice cream
- Main ingredients: Ice cream, cream

A knickerbocker glory is a layered ice cream sundae that is served in a large tall conical glass, and to be eaten with a distinctive long spoon, particularly in Great Britain and Ireland.

The knickerbocker glory, first described in the 1920s, may contain ice cream, cream, fruit, and meringue. Layers of these different sweet tastes are alternated in a tall glass and topped with different kinds of syrup, chocolate, nuts, whipped cream and often a cherry. The existence of these layers, which create red and white stripes, distinguishes the dish from a tall sundae and lends the knickerbocker glory its name.

== History and etymology ==
An early form of the knickerbocker glory is believed to have originated in New York City in the early 1900s. The name knickerbocker (as it pertains to the dish) is thought to be named after the Knickerbocker Hotel in Manhattan. During the early 1900s, the hotel was pink-and-cream-colored, and well-known to the denizens of New York. After it closed in 1920, a tall pink-and-cream colored dish was created in honor of the hotel and the word glory was appended to the name of the dish. At some point in the 1920s, the dish was introduced into the United Kingdom, where it attained wide popularity.

== See also ==
- Knickerbocker, a Filipino dessert derived from knickerbocker glory
- Parfait
- Banana split
- Halo-halo
- Falooda
- Ais kacang
