= Lamaw =

Filipino dessert

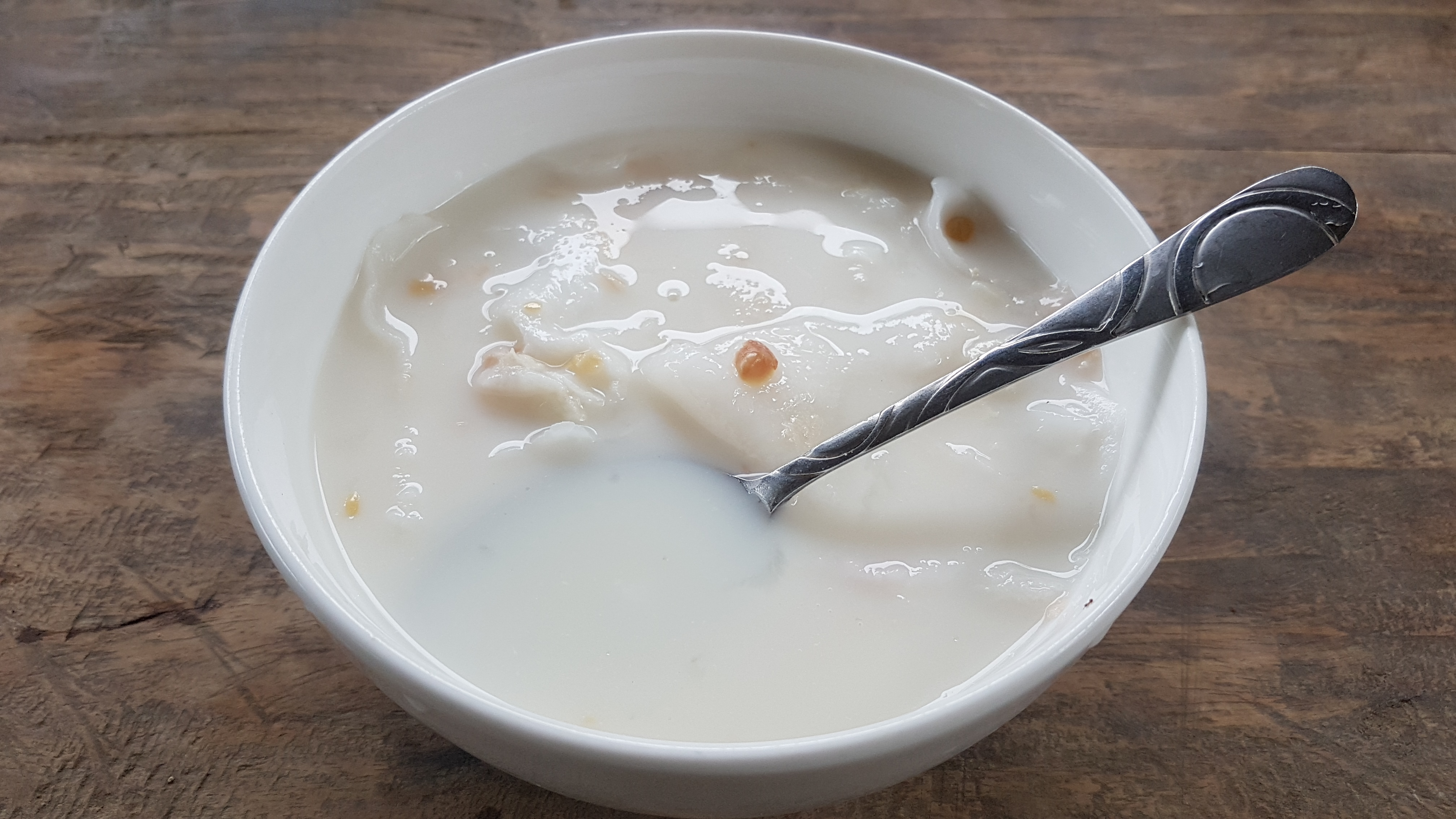
- Alternative names: Buko lamaw, coconut lamaw
- Course: Dessert
- Place of origin: The Philippines
- Region or state: Visayas, Mindanao
- Serving temperature: Chilled, room temperature
- Main ingredients: Coconut water, young coconut, biscuits or saltines, milk

Lamaw, also known as buko lamaw, is a Filipino dessert or beverage made from scraped young coconut meat (buko) in coconut water with milk and sugar (or condensed milk), and saltines or biscuits. Variations may add ingredients like peanuts, graham crackers, or orange-flavored softdrinks. Ice cubes are commonly added to chill the dessert. It is usually made from freshly gathered coconuts and is commonly served within the coconut shell itself. It originates from the Visayas and Visayan areas of Mindanao and is a traditional merienda for farmers working in the fields in rural areas.

The name of the dessert is from Visayan lamaw, meaning "swill" or "slop", due to its appearance. The term can sometimes also be used to refer to similar desserts made from papaya, star apple, or avocado with milk and sugar.

== See also ==
- Avocado and milk in ice (Avocado lamaw)
- Buko pie
- Buko salad
- Halo-halo
- Ice buko
- Samalamig
