= Ice buko =

Filipino frozen dessert

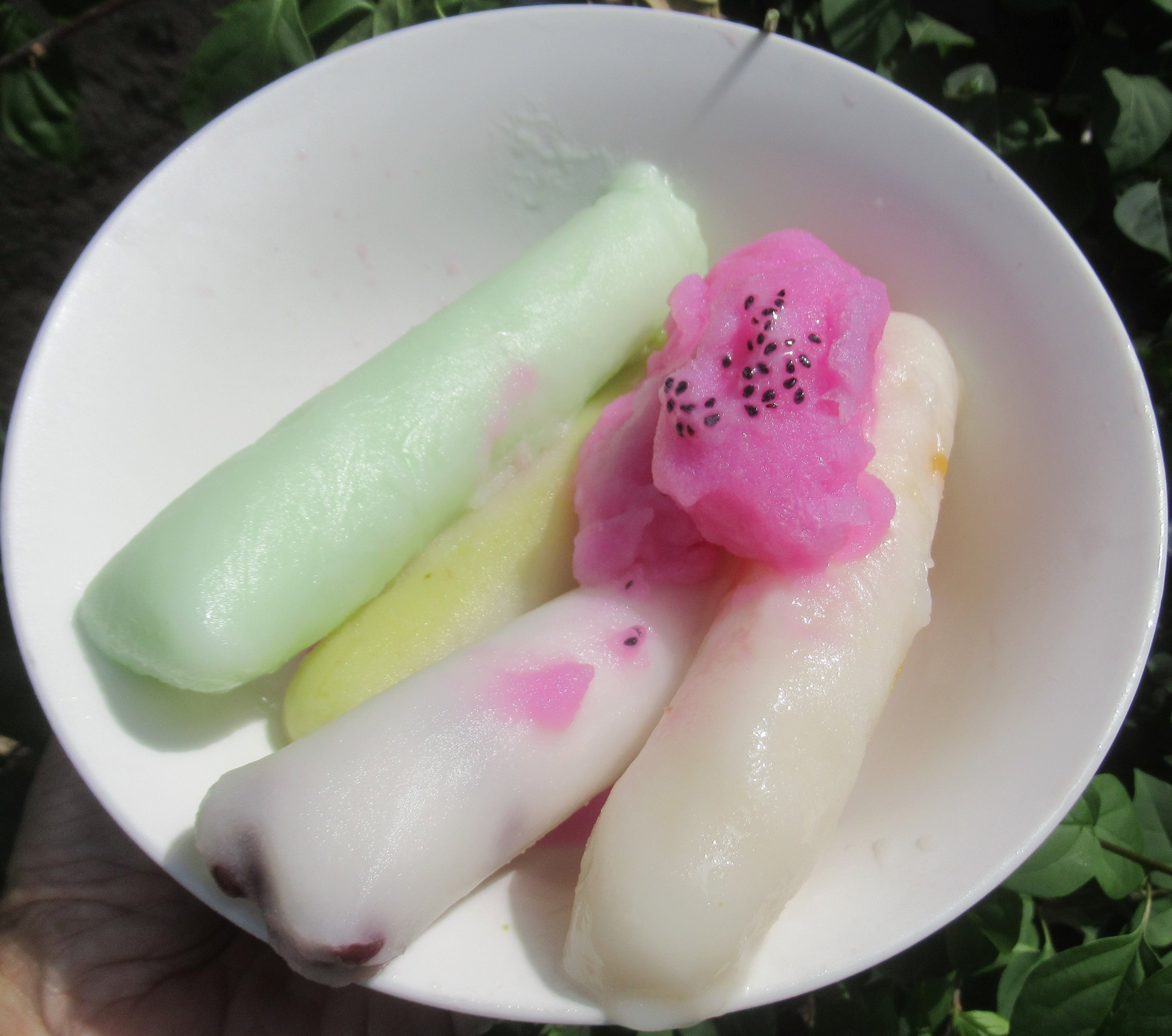
- Alternative names: Coconut popsicle, ice buko salad, buko salad ice candy, buko ice candy
- Course: Dessert
- Place of origin: Philippines
- Main ingredients: Condensed milk, young coconut strips, coconut water

Ice buko, also known as buko ice candy or coconut popsicle, is a Filipino frozen dessert made from condensed milk, young coconut (buko) strips, and coconut water. It is basically a frozen version of the buko salad. They can be sold on popsicle sticks or in plastic bags as ice candy. They commonly include other ingredients like peanuts, pinipig (toasted young rice), macapuno, pandan leaf extracts, various fruits, including pitaya or dragon fruit or sweetened mung beans (or adzuki beans). They are popular desserts during the summer and are commonly sold by sari-sari stores and sorbeteros.

== See also ==
- Buko salad
- Halo-halo
- Ice scramble
- Lamaw
- Sorbetes
