= Mais con yelo =

Shaved ice dessert from the Philippines

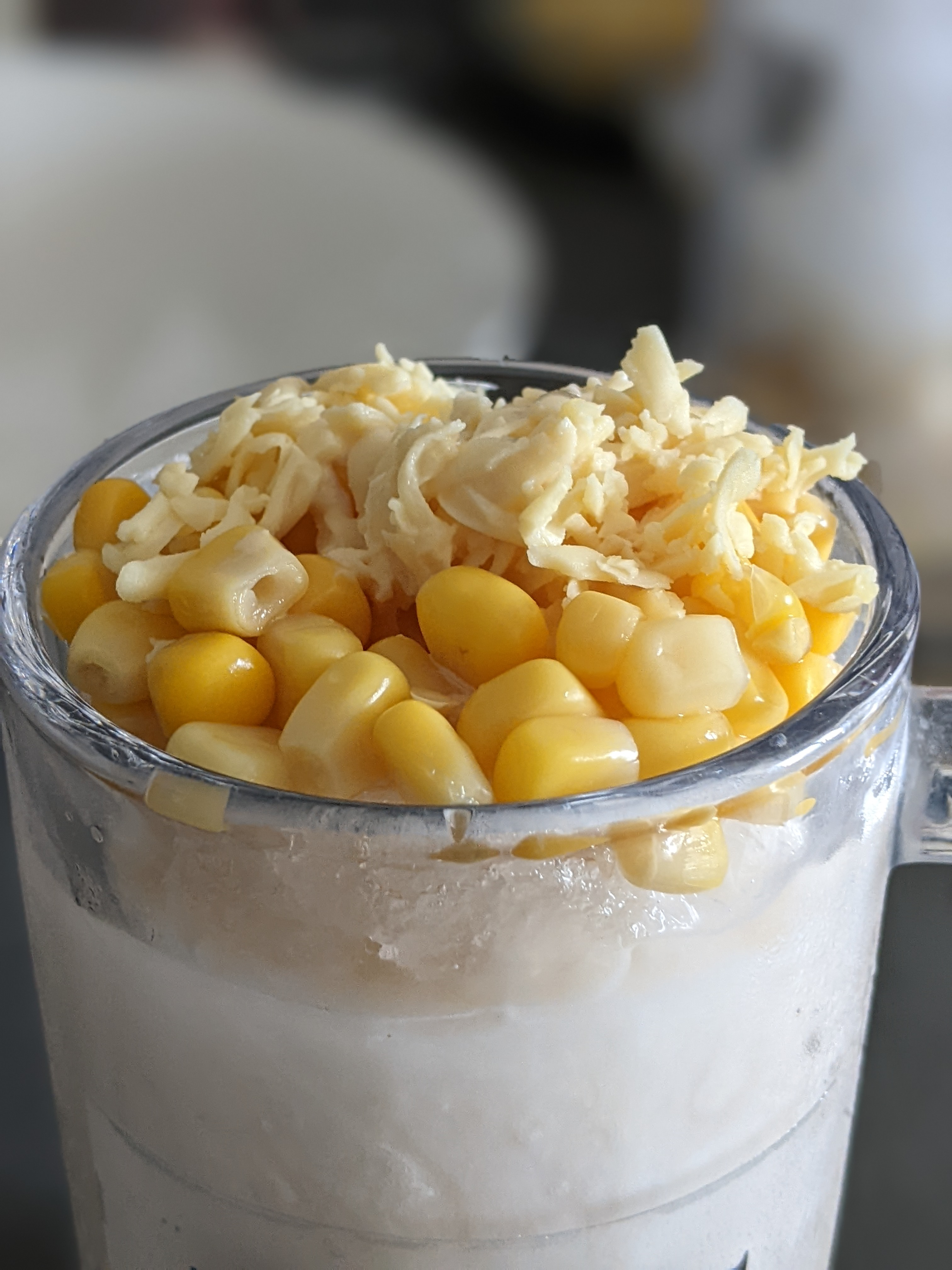
- Mais con yelo served in a glass
- Course: Snack, dessert
- Place of origin: Philippines
- Serving temperature: Cold
- Main ingredients: Shaved ice, corn kernels, sugar, milk
- Similar dishes: Saba con yelo, halo-halo

Mais con yelo (from Spanish maíz con hielo, meaning "corn with ice") is a shaved ice dessert from the Philippines made with boiled corn kernels, sugar, and milk.

== Ingredients ==
Mais con yelo is a mixture of shaved ice, corn kernels, sugar, and milk. Usually popular in the summer months, it is a variation of the more renowned halo-halo.

== See also ==
- Bilo-bilo
- Binaki
- Binatog
- Halo-halo
- Ice buko
- Saba con yelo
- Sorbetes
