= Insular Ice Plant =

Defunct ice plant in the Philippines

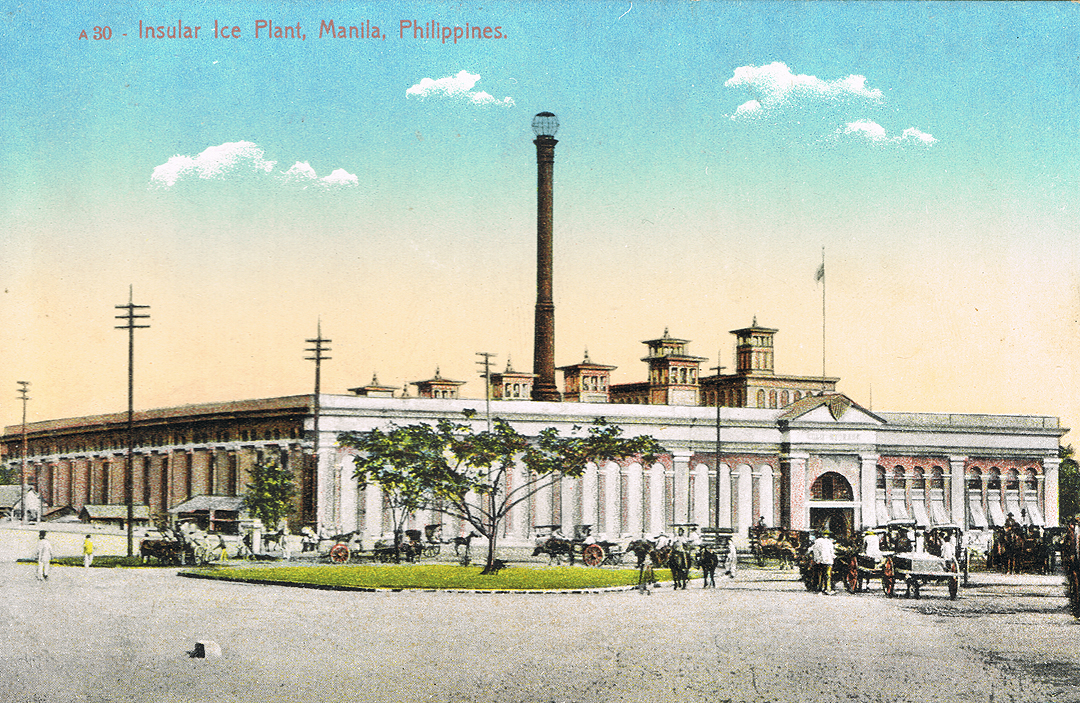

- Location in the Philippines
- Built: 1902
- Location: Ermita, Manila, Philippines
- Coordinates: 14°35′44″N 120°58′52″E
- Industry: Ice making, Refrigeration, Manufacturing
- Products: Ice
- Architect: Edgar K. Bourne (consultant)
- Style: Mission Revivalist
- Owner: San Miguel Corporation (former operator/lessor)
- Defunct: 1943

The Insular Ice and Cold Storage Plant also known simply as the Insular Ice Plant was an ice production and storage facility in Ermita, Manila, Philippines. It was said that the facility was leased or operated between 1933 up until 1943 by San Miguel Brewery, which had acquired "Oriental Brewery and Ice Co." from Hong Kong back in 1919. It was the oldest ice manufacturing plant in Southeast Asia.

== History ==
The Insular Ice Plant was built in 1902 at near the southern end of the Puente Colgante, later Quezon Bridge. The United States Congress approved the construction of the plant to "provide supplies comfort" to US troops. The facility was one of the first permanent structure by the Americans during the American administration of the Philippines.

It was later severely damaged due to the Battle for Manila of World War II, leaving the tall smoke stack. The Insular Ice Plant was later dismantled in the 1980s to make way for the construction of the viaduct of the Manila Light Rail Transit System Line 1. Today, the lot is occupied by the Liwasang Bonifacio station of the Pasig River Ferry Service, and a bus terminal.

== Architecture ==
The Insular Ice Plant was designed by American architect, Edgar K. Bourne, who was also the head of the Bureau of Architecture as per the Philippine Commission during that time. The facility was designed as a Mission Revivalist brick structure with a ten-story high smoke stack, which made it a city landmark.

== See also ==
- Icemaker
- Quezon Bridge
- San Miguel Brewery
