= Pinipig =

Flattened rice ingredient in the Philippines

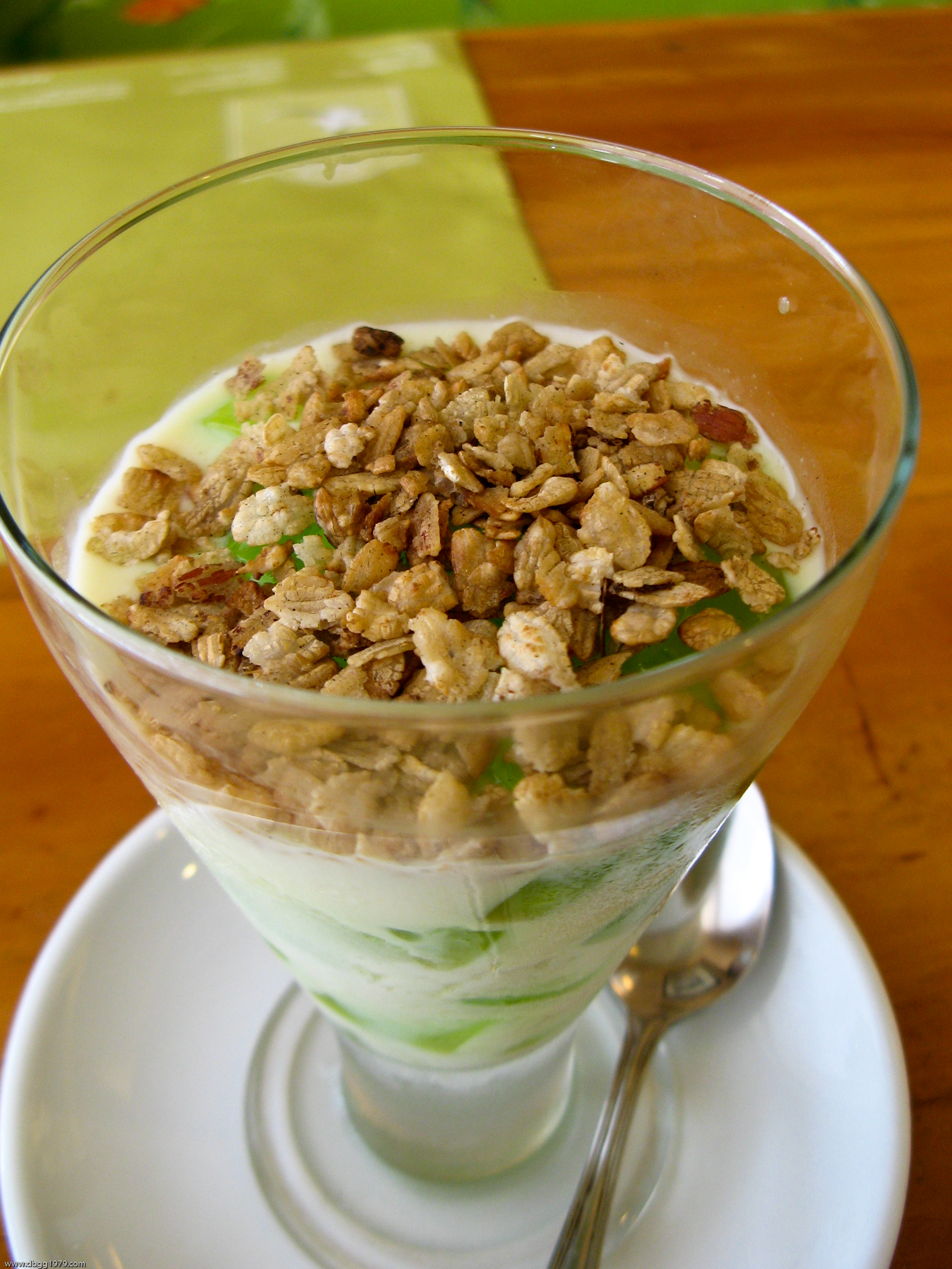
- Pinipig toppings on buko pandan (a drink made from coconut meat, cream, and gulaman cubes flavored with pandan leaves)
- Place of origin: Philippines
- Main ingredients: Glutinous rice

Pinipig is a flattened rice ingredient from the Philippines. It is made of immature grains of glutinous rice pounded until flat before being toasted. It is commonly used as toppings for various desserts in Filipino cuisine, but can also be eaten plain, made into cakes, or mixed with drinks and other dishes.

== Production ==
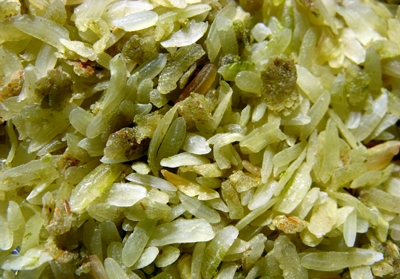
Duman rice

Pinipig is made solely from glutinous rice (malagkit or "sticky" rice). The grains are harvested while still green. They are husked and the chaff is separated from the grain (traditionally using large flat winnowing baskets called bilao). The resulting bright green kernels are then pounded in large wooden mortars and pestles until flat. They are then toasted dry on pans or baked until crisp.

== Description ==
Pinipig are characteristically light green in color when fresh, but usually become yellowish white to brown when toasted. They superficially resemble grains of oats, and are often confused with puffed rice. The texture is crunchy on the exterior with a chewy center.

== Variants ==
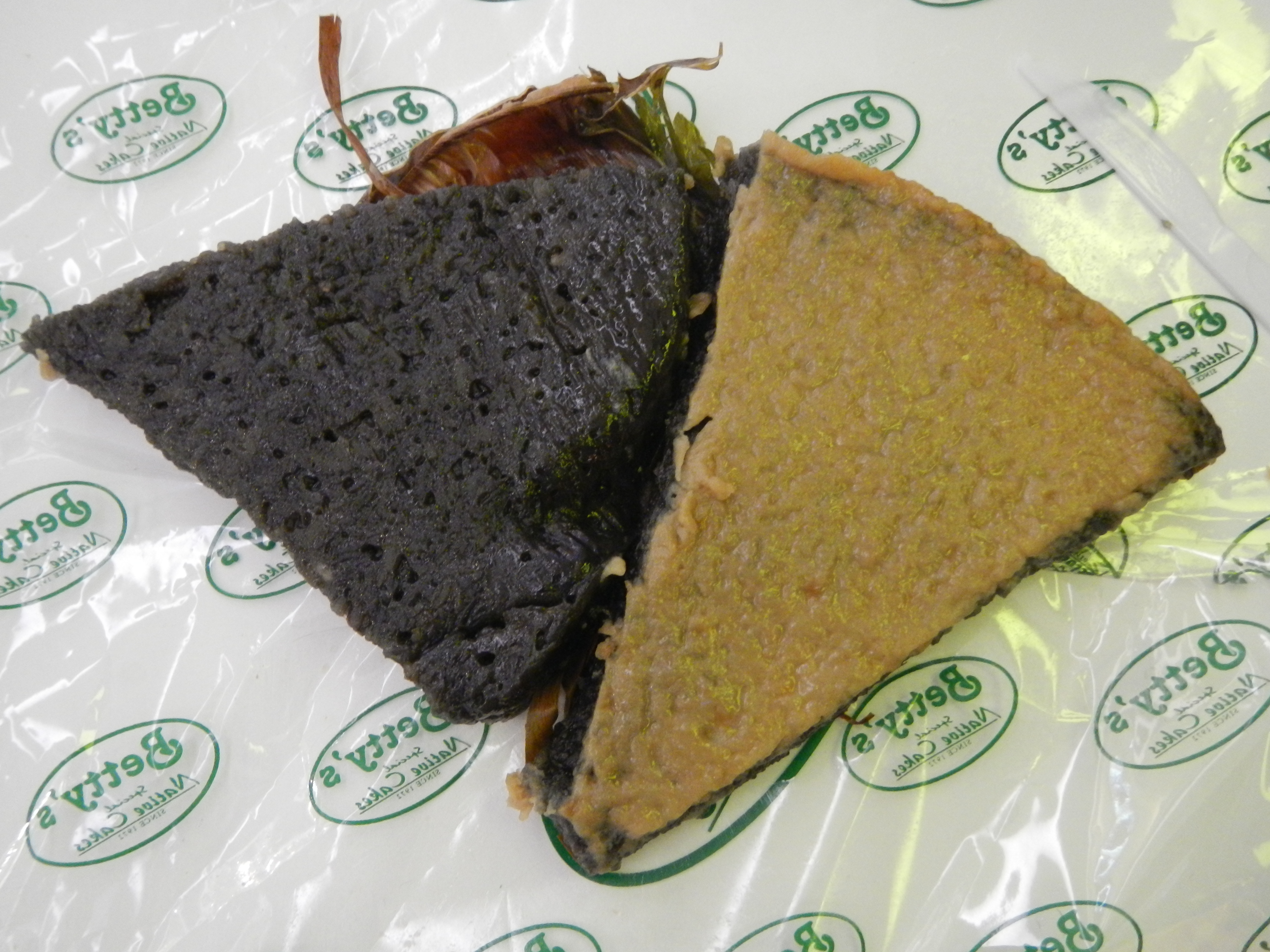
Cakes made from duman, a variant of pinipig from Santa Rita, Pampanga

A notable regional variant of the pinipig is the duman, which is made in Santa Rita, Pampanga in the Philippines. Duman, like pinipig, is also made from immature grains of glutinous rice, but it is toasted before it is pounded.

A similar delicacy also exists called cốm in Vietnam and Thailand.

== See also ==
- Flattened rice
- Cốm, a similar dish in Vietnam which uses green rice grains
- Poha, a similar dish in South Asia which uses mature rice grains
- Ampaw
- Freekeh
- Rolled oats
