= Macapuno =

Coconut cultivar with little coconut water

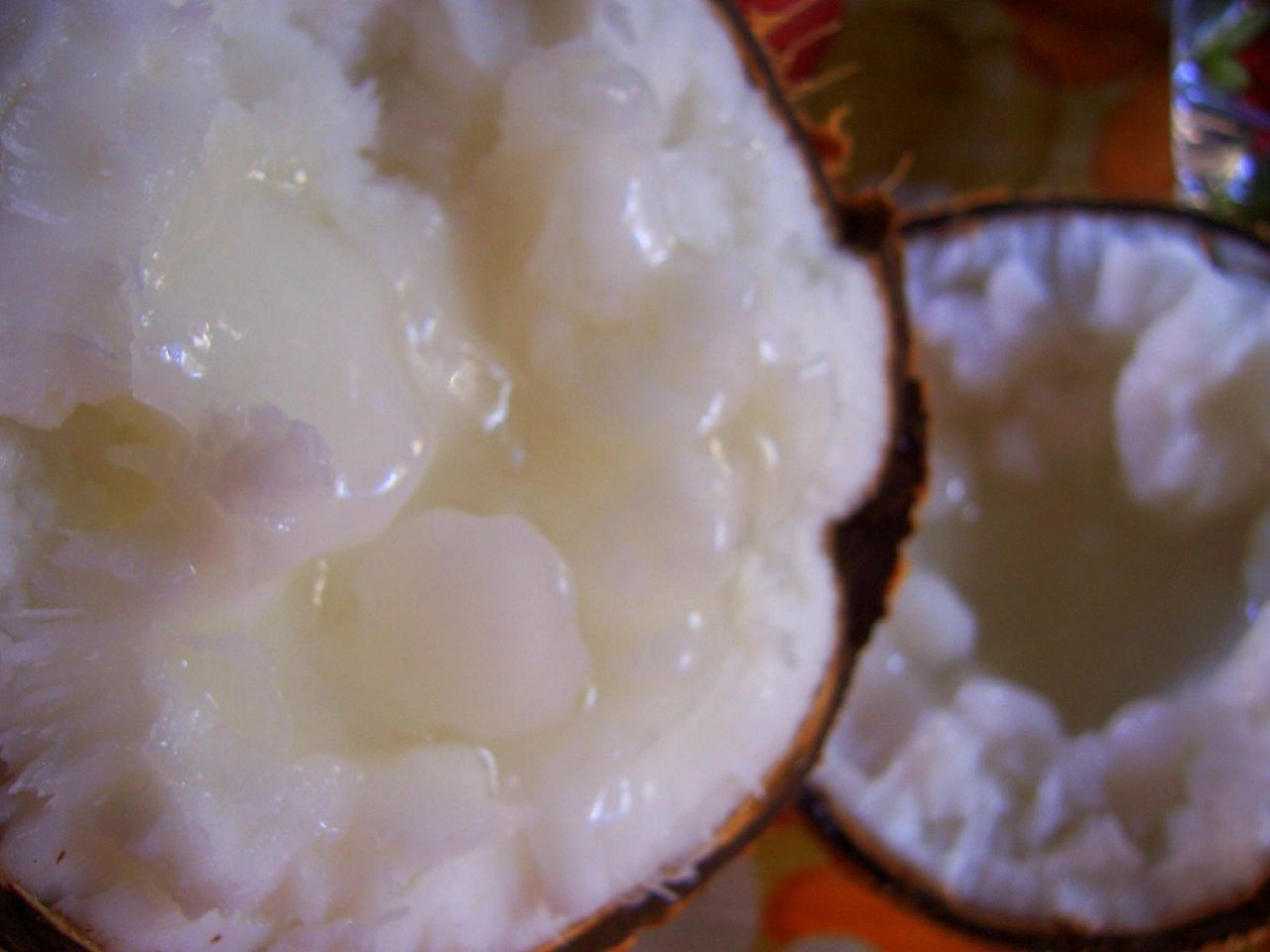
- The endosperm of macapuno coconuts are jelly-like and fill almost the entirety of the central cavity in coconut seeds
- Alternative names: Coconut sport
- Place of origin: Philippines (originally domesticated)
- Region or state: Southeast Asia and the Pacific Islands
- Associated cuisine: Philippines, Indonesian
- Main ingredients: Coconut

Macapuno, also called coconut sport, is a naturally occurring coconut cultivar that has an abnormal development of the endosperm. The result of this abnormal development is a soft translucent jelly-like flesh that fills almost the entire central cavity of coconut seeds, with little to no coconut water.

Macapuno was first described scientifically from wild specimens in 1931 by Edwin Copeland. They were cultivated commercially in the Philippines after the development of the "embryo rescue" in vitro culture technology in the 1960s by Emerita V. De Guzman. Although called coconut sport, this mutation is not necessarily a sport in the botanical sense of a mutation arising in part of an adult plant; it may have arisen originally in a seed. It has become an important crop in coconut-producing countries and is now widely used in the cuisines of Southeast Asia and the Pacific Islands.

== Name ==
The name macapuno (also spelled makapuno) is derived from Tagalog makapuno, the local name of the phenotype in the Philippines, meaning "characterized by being full", a reference to the way the endosperm in macapuno coconuts fill the interior hollow of coconut seeds.

In Indonesia, the name kelapa puan means female coconut in the Indonesian language, referring to the relatively softer texture of the fruit flesh compared to regular coconut. Kelapa kopyor means scrambled coconut in the Javanese language, referring to when eggs are shaken, mixing the albumen (white) and yolk (yellow). The coconut is named so because of the white yellowish colour and "cluttered" texture. Kelapa lilin means "wax coconut" in the Indonesian language. These three coconut mutations have different properties but are frequently confused.

It is also known as dong kathi in Cambodia, thairu tengai in India, niu garuk in Papua New Guinea, pia in Polynesia, dikiri pol in Sri Lanka, maprao kathi (Thai: มะพร้าว กะทิ) in Thailand, and dừa sáp ('wax coconut') in Vietnam.

== Characteristics ==
It is impossible to distinguish macapuno seeds from normal seeds based on the external appearance of the fruits. The only way to ascertain if a seed has the macapuno phenotype is to open it.

Normal coconut flesh mostly consists of galactomannan as a source of energy. In the development process, this substrate is degraded into two sub-components, galactose and mannose. In macapuno, the enzyme for degrading this substrate, α-D-galactosidase, is not active. Hence, the endosperm fails to nourish the embryo, resulting in a collapsed embryo. Besides this enzyme, a couple of other enzymes are also suspected of being involved in the development of this trait: sucrose synthase and stearoyl acyl carrier protein desaturase.

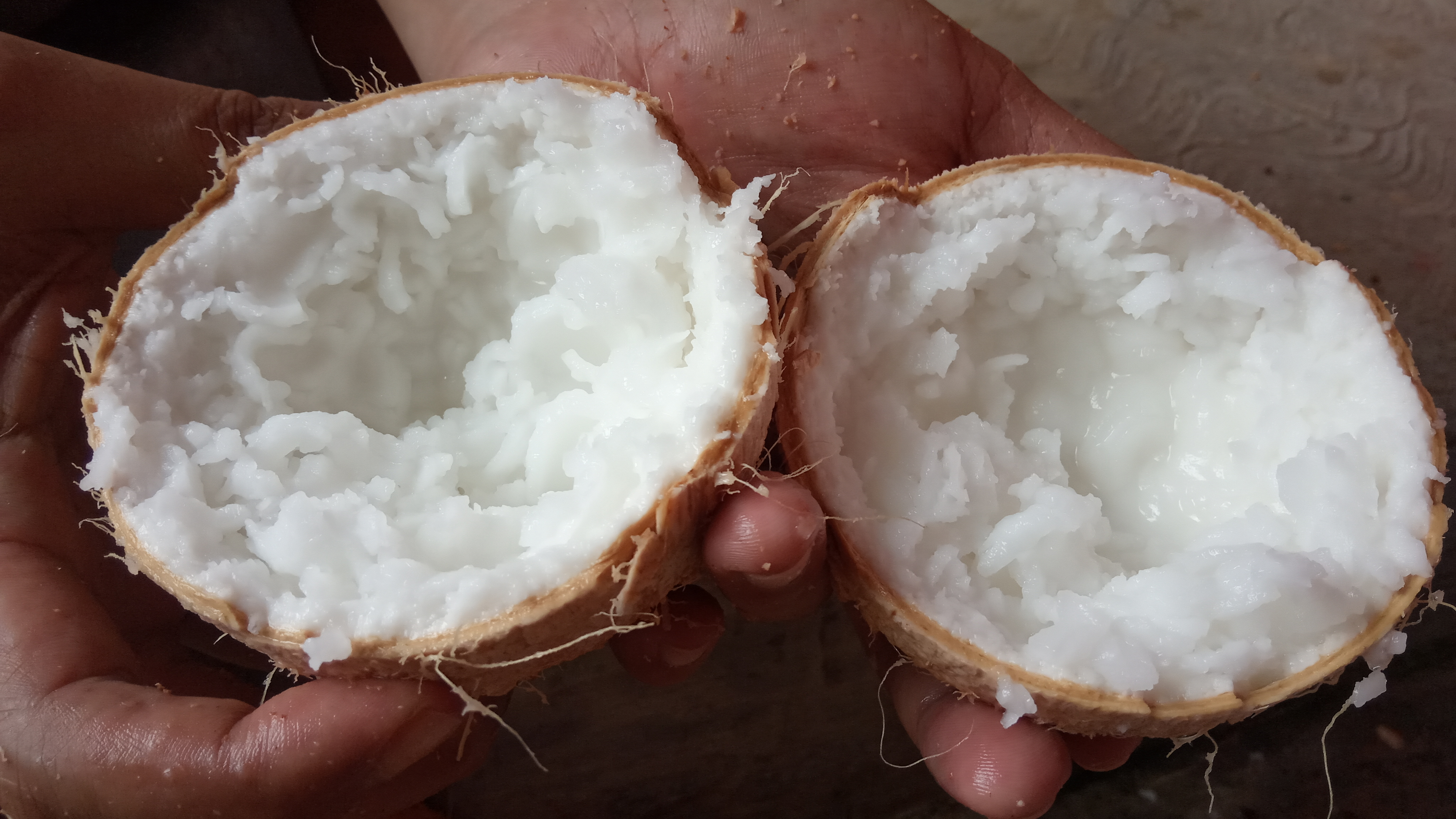
An opened kopyor seed from Indonesia

Kopyor coconuts have a higher sucrose proportion (92% of total sugar) and contain more total amino acids compared with young mature coconuts. The lipid content in the flesh is also lower compared to young mature coconut flesh. In addition to the higher content of citric and malic acids, all these properties may contribute to the taste of kopyor flesh.

Macapuno are classified into three types (I, II, and III), depending on how much the soft endosperm fills the seeds.

== Cause ==
The macapuno phenotype is believed to be controlled by a recessive gene (m) expressed as a homozygous condition in wild macapuno-bearing palms. This would explain why naturally occurring macapuno palms bear both macapuno seeds and normal seeds, as pure macapuno palms would be impossible in the wild. Laboratory experiments have also shown that self-pollinated or cross-pollinated rescued macapuno embryos result in pure macapuno palms that have 100% macapuno seed yields, reinforcing the hypothesis. The presence of the dominant gene M would produce normal viable coconuts. The xenia effect may also play a factor in the expression of macapuno phenotypes.

macapuno embryo and endosperm genotypes postulated
	Egg nucleus (n)		Polar nuclei (2n)	
Sperm nucleus (n)	M	m	MM	mm
M	MM; Germinating embryo	Mm; Germinating embryo	MMM; Normal endosperm	Mmm; Normal endosperm
m	Mm; Germinating embryo	mm Non-germinating embryo	MMm; Normal endosperm	mmm macapuno endosperm

== History of cultivation ==
Macapuno occurs sporadically in the wild at very low rates of 0.15% throughout the native range of Pacific coconuts. It occurs in palms which bear both the macapuno and normal seeds. Macapuno was initially reported in scientific literature in 1931 by Edwin Copeland, an American botanist working for the Department of Agriculture of the Insular Government of the Philippine Islands (then an American territory). The original specimens were described from Laguna, Philippines and Tangerang, Indonesia.

Macapuno remained rare and expensive, despite being valued as a traditional delicacy, because macapuno seeds are non-viable. While the embryos of macapuno seeds are normal, the surrounding abnormal endosperm can not support their germination, thus rendering macapuno seeds effectively sterile. Traditional propagation of macapuno involved taking the viable (normal) seeds from the same racemes as macapuno seeds and planting them. While macapuno yields could be increased by planting macapuno-bearing palms close together or in isolation, the chances of the phenotype reoccurring in the fruits of the progeny was very low, at only 2 to 21%.

Mass propagation of macapuno seedlings only became possible through the development of "embryo rescue" in vitro culture technology by the Filipina plant physiologist Emerita V. De Guzman of the University of the Philippines in the 1960s. By extracting ("rescuing") the embryo inside macapuno seeds and culturing them in vitro, she was able to increase macapuno yields per palm to 75 to 100%. This technology was later improved in the 1990s by the Albay Research Center of the Philippine Coconut Authority (PCA-ARC) headed by the Filipina biotechnologist Erlinda P. Rillo.

Four other improved protocols for coconut embryo culture technology were further developed by the PCA-ARC, University of the Philippines Los Baños (UPLB), the Central Plantation Crops Research Institute (CPCRI) of India, and the Institut de recherche pour le développement (IRD) of France. These were tested by fourteen laboratories in eleven countries (China, India, Indonesia, the Philippines, Papua New Guinea, Sri Lanka, Vietnam, Brazil, France, Mexico, and Tanzania) in the 1997 global Coconut Embryo Culture Project. These protocols were later combined into the improved embryo culture protocol by Areza-Ubaldo, et al. (2003) of the PCA and is now the primary method of mass-producing macapuno seedlings in coconut-producing countries.

== Culinary uses ==
In Filipino cuisine, macapuno is widely used and is popular for its sweet coconut flavor. It can be eaten on its own or used as an ingredient in traditional desserts like halo-halo and pastillas or cooked in syrup as a minatamis (fruit preserve). It is also used widely in processed food products, including ice creams, pastries, cakes, candies, and beverages. A traditional combination in Filipino cuisine that is also a common flavoring in various desserts is macapuno and ube halaya (mashed purple yam), a pairing known as "ube macapuno".

In Vietnam, macapuno is grown in Tra Vinh and Ben Tre provinces and is an expensive delicacy. Its flesh is mixed with milk and crushed ice to make a smoothie and served with crushed toasted peanuts.

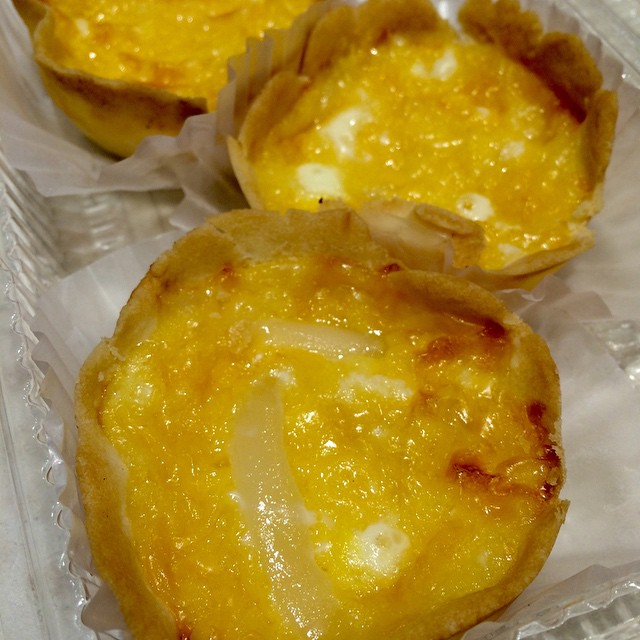
Macapuno tarts from the Philippines

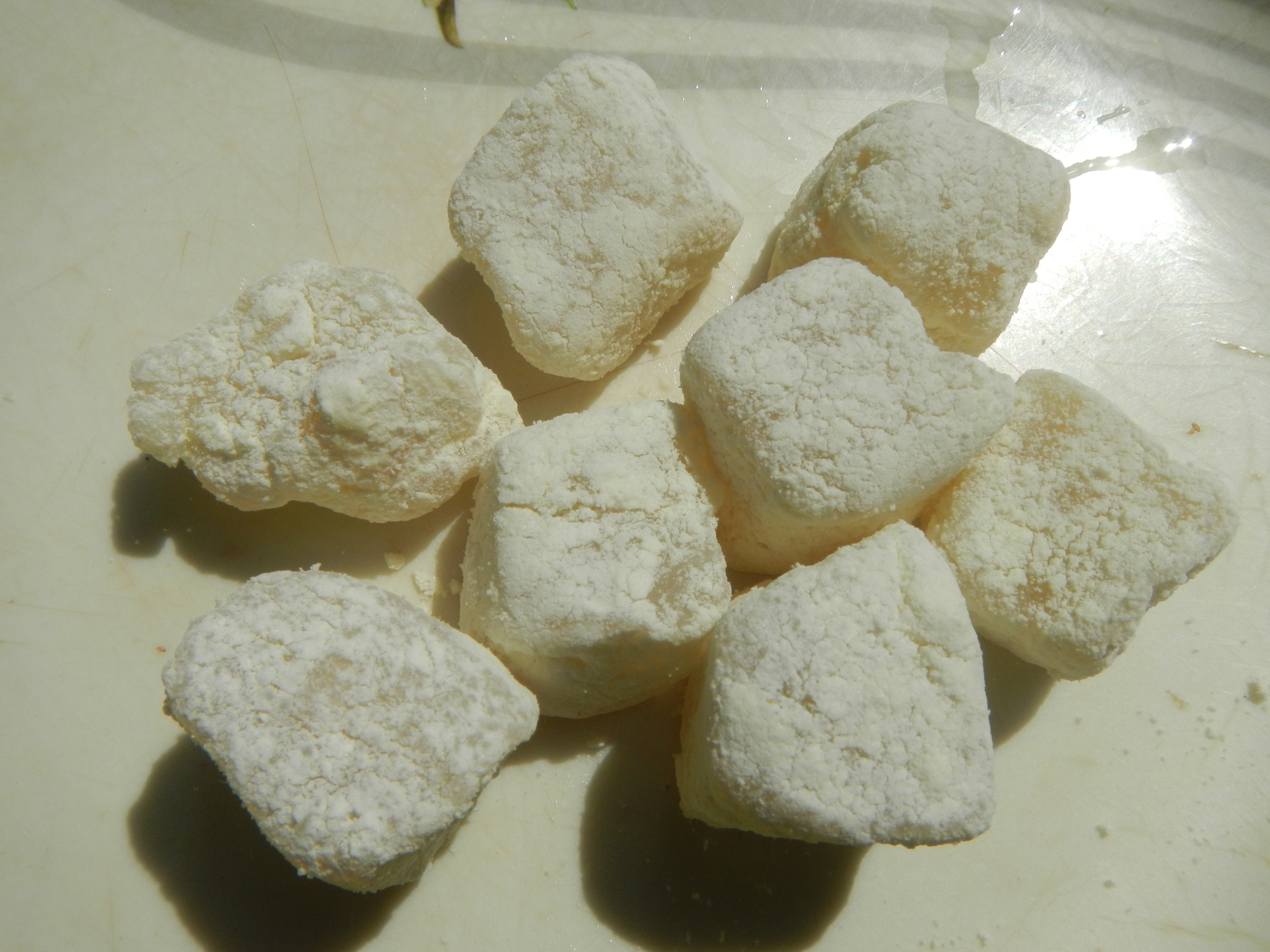
Macapuno pastillas from the Philippines

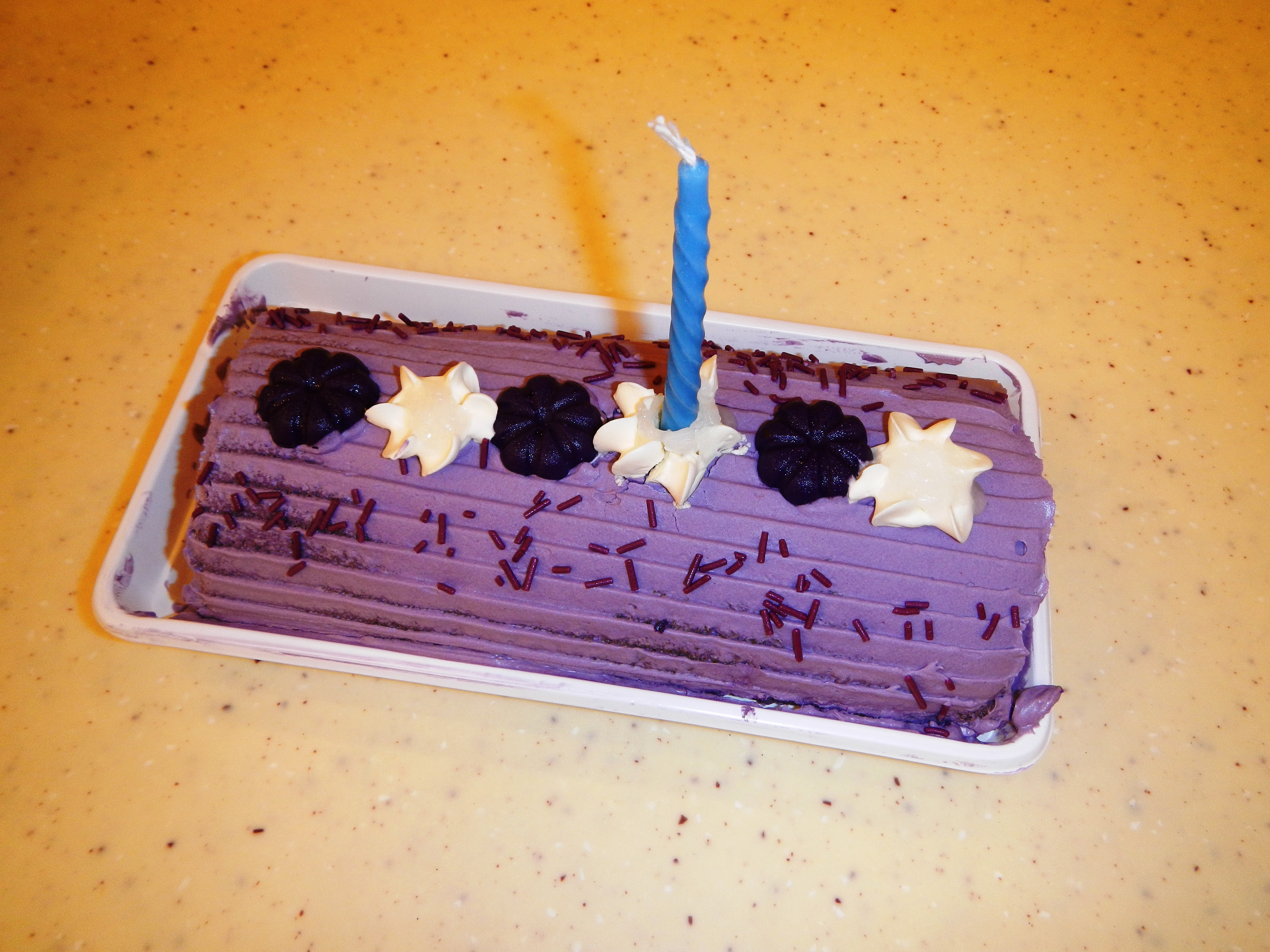
Ube macapuno pianono from the Philippines

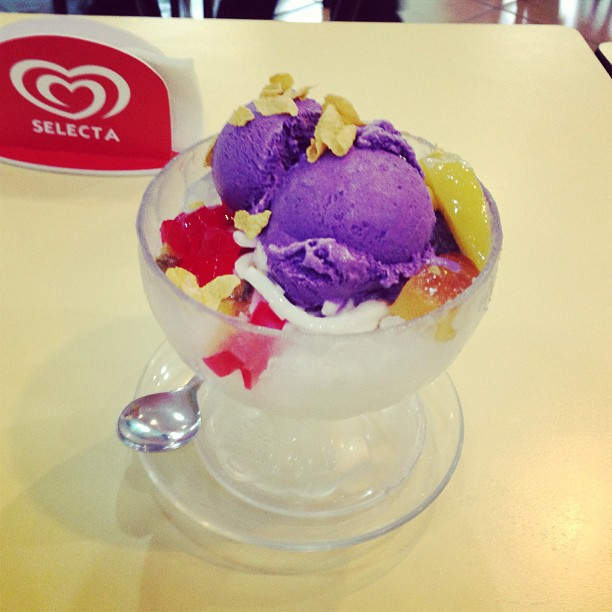
Halo-halo with macapuno strips from the Philippines

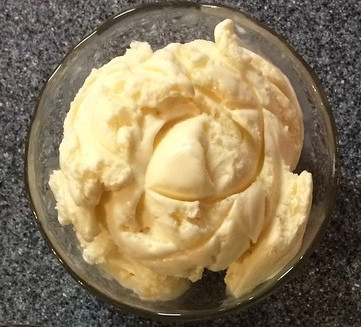
Macapuno ice cream in California

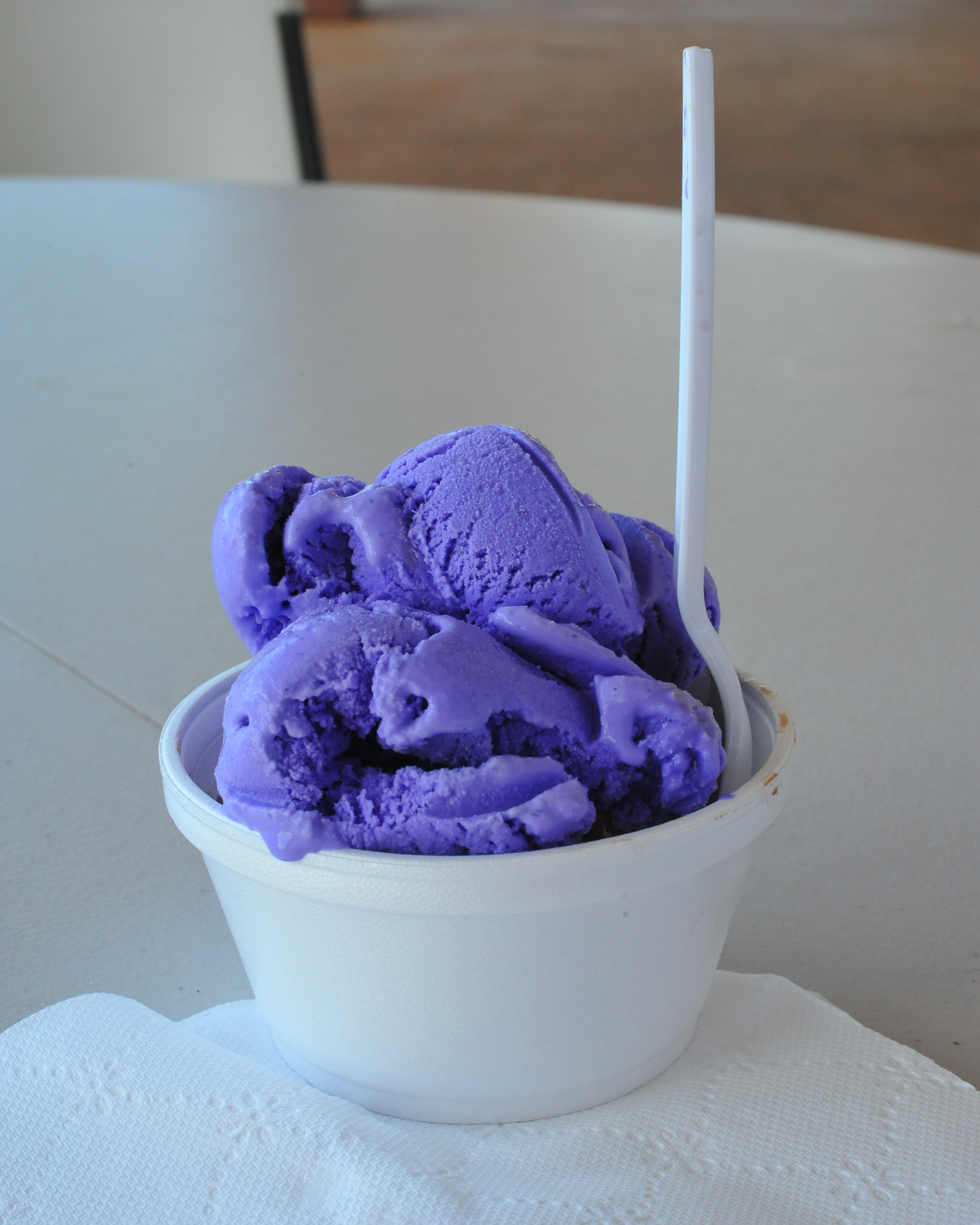
Ube macapuno ice cream in Hawaii

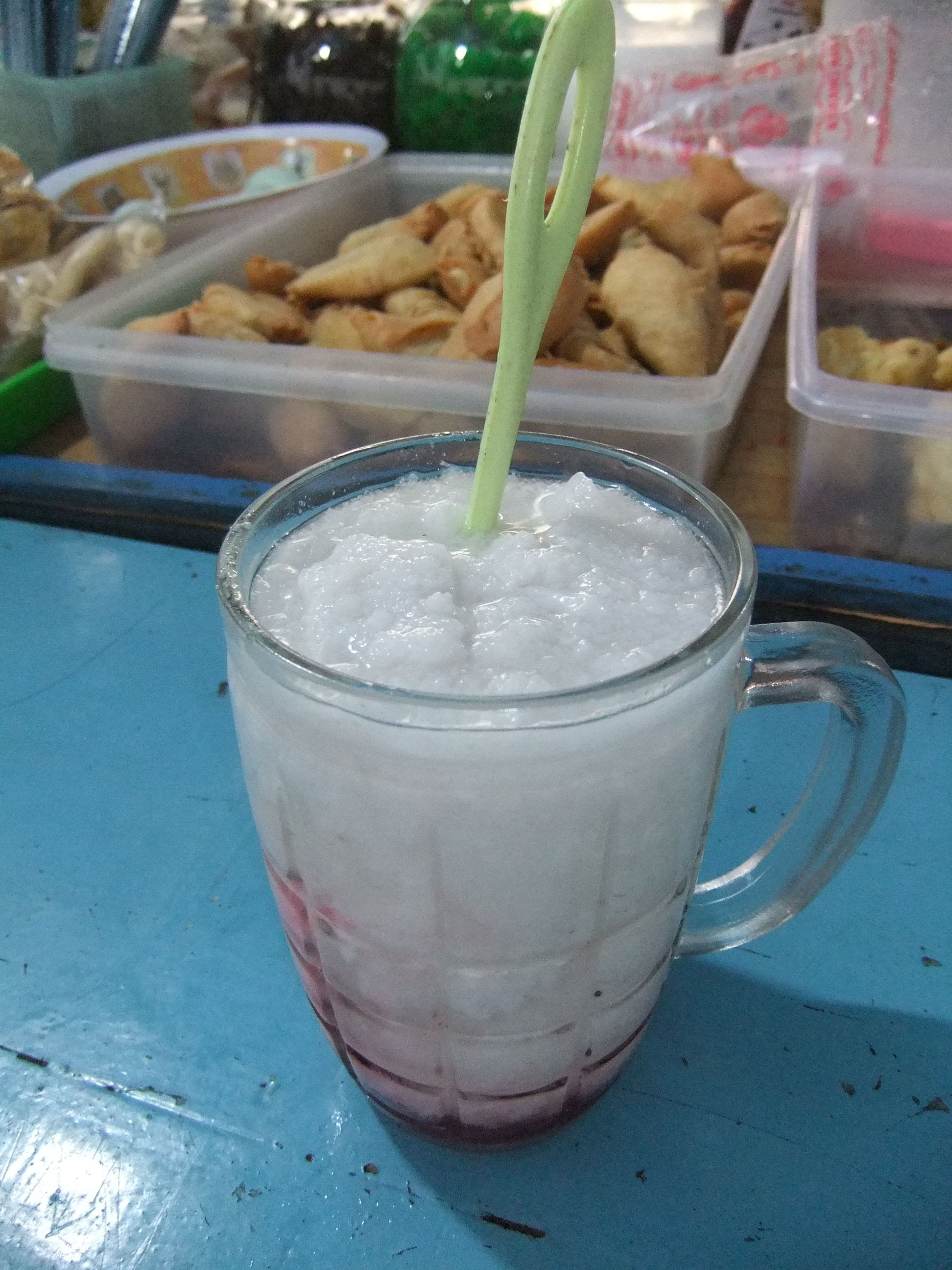
Es kelapa kopyor from Indonesia

== See also ==
- Nata de coco, another coconut product developed in the Philippines
- Coconut sprout
