= Halo-halo =

Filipino dessert

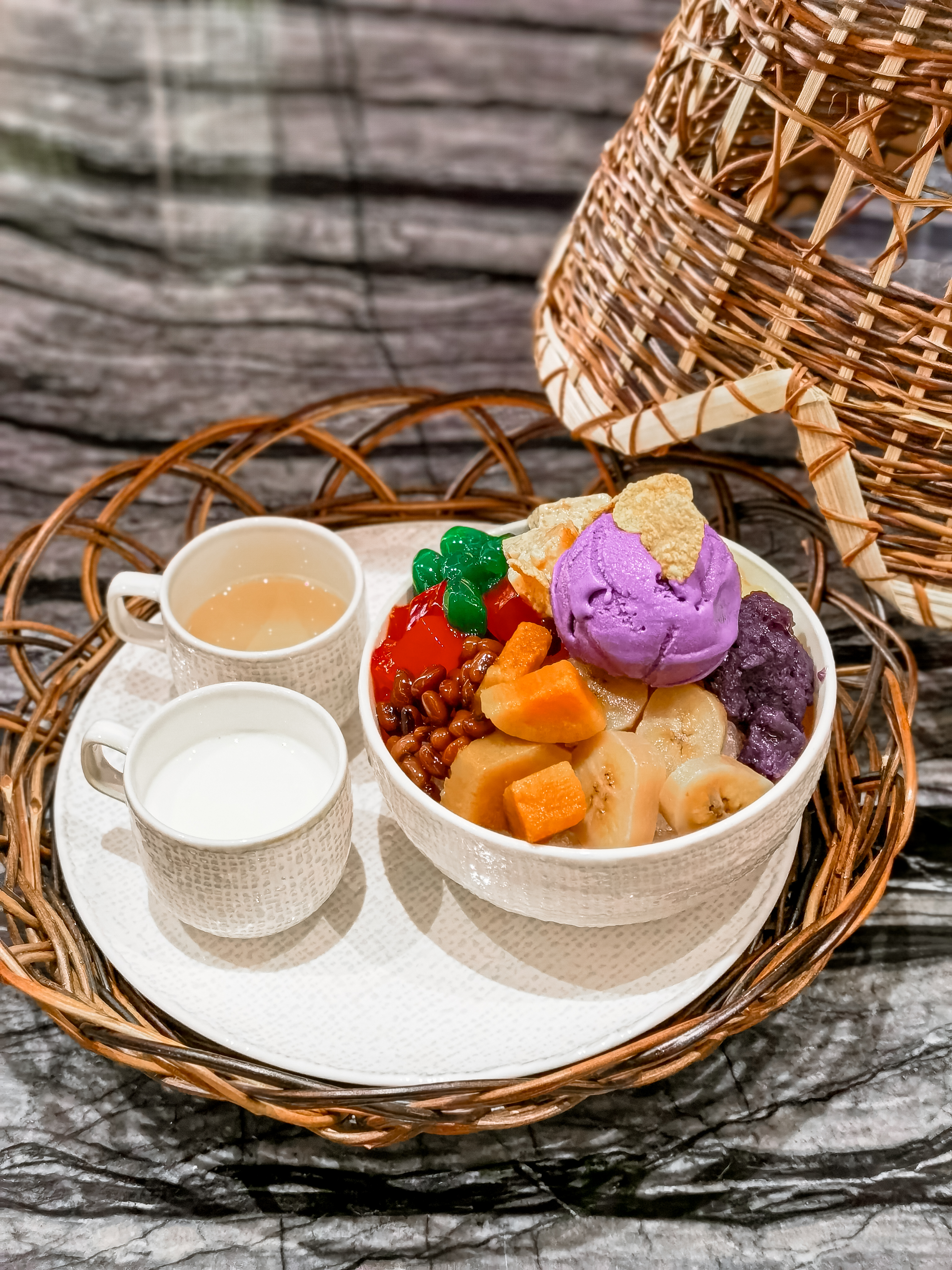
- A bowl of halo-halo
- Type: Frozen dessert
- Course: Dessert
- Place of origin: The Philippines
- Serving temperature: Cold
- Main ingredients: Shaved ice, milk, various fruits

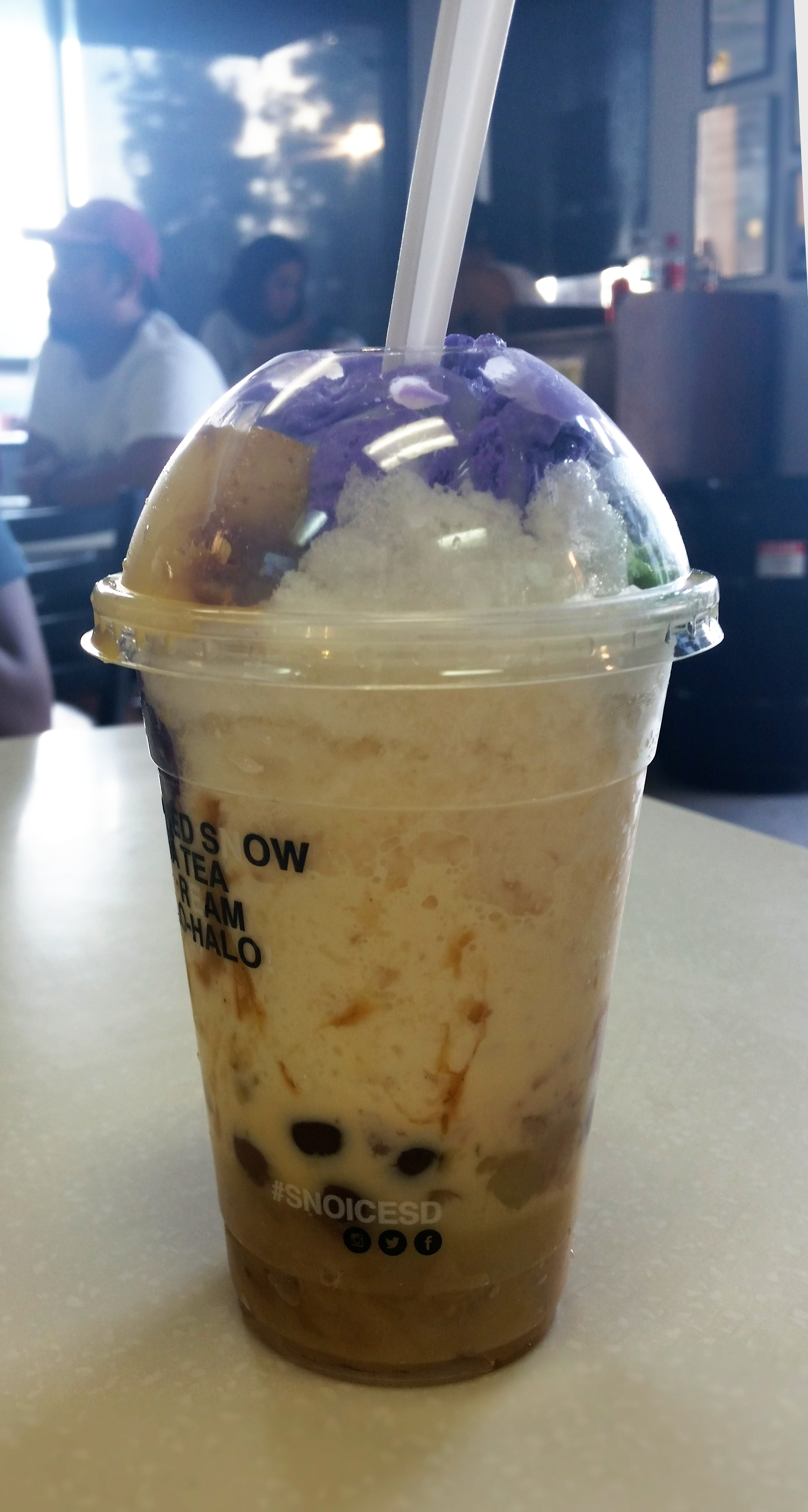
Halo-halo made in Spring Valley, California

Halo-halo is a cold dessert in the Philippines made with crushed ice, evaporated milk or sometimes coconut milk, and flavoring such as ube jam (ube halaya), sweetened kidney beans or garbanzo beans, coconut strips, sago, gulaman (agar), pinipig, boiled taro or soft yams in cubes, flan, slices or portions of fruit preserves, and other root crop preserves. The dessert is often topped with a scoop of ube ice cream and sometimes other fruit-based ice cream flavors like melon or coconut, though it is just as likely to go without ice cream as well. It is usually prepared in a tall clear glass and served with a long spoon. Halo-halo is considered to be the unofficial national dessert of the Philippines.

== Name ==
Halo-halo is often literally translated as "mix-mix" in English. The word, which does not necessarily refer to the dessert, is an adjective properly meaning "mixed [together]" in Filipino. It is a reduplication of the Filipino verb halò, which means "to mix".

Halúhalò is the prescribed spelling of the word in the Commission on the Filipino Language's official dictionary.

== History ==
The origin of halo-halo is traced to the pre-war Japanese Filipinos and the Japanese kakigōri class of desserts. One of the earliest versions of halo-halo was a dessert known locally as monggo con hielo (derived from the Spanish Filipino dessert maíz con hielo) or mongo-ya, which consisted of only mung beans (Tagalog: monggo or munggo, used in place of red azuki beans from Japan), boiled and cooked in syrup (minatamis na monggo), served on top of crushed ice with milk and sugar.

Over time, more native ingredients were added, resulting in the creation and development of the modern halo-halo. One difference between halo-halo and its Japanese ancestor is the placement of ingredients mainly under the ice instead of on top of it. The original monggo con hielo can still be found today, with similar variations using sweet corn (mais con hielo) or saba bananas (saba con hielo).

Some authors specifically attribute halo-halo to the 1920s or 1930s Japanese migrants in the Quinta Market of Quiapo, Manila, due to its proximity to the Insular Ice Plant, Quiapo's main ice supply. The Insular Ice Plant was built in 1902 by the Americans, which became the ice supplier for the Philippines. Although the ice plant was built, it was not the first introduction of ice to the Philippines. In the mid-19th century, the United States exported ice from Wenham Lake to different countries, including India, Australia, and the Philippines.

== Description ==
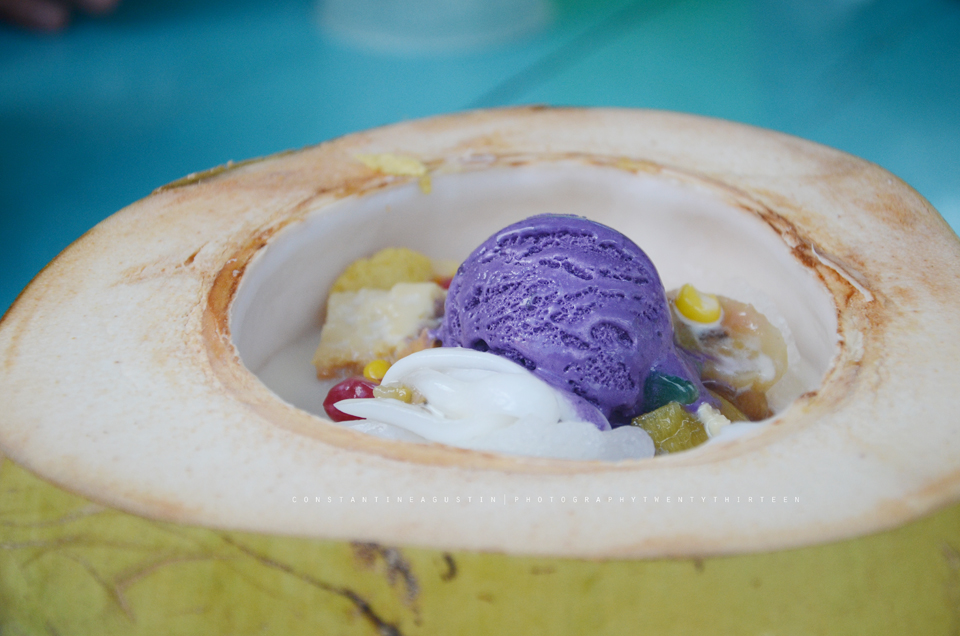
Buko halo, a combination of halo-halo and buko salad, usually served directly on coconut shells

There is no standard set of ingredients for halo-halo as the ingredients can vary widely, but the dessert usually includes sugar palm fruit (kaong), coconut sport (macapunô), saba plantains cooked in syrup (minatamís na saging), jackfruit (langkâ), agar jellies (gulaman), tapioca pearls, nata de coco, sweet potato cooked in syrup (minatamís na kamote), beans cooked in syrup, pounded toasted young rice (pinipig), and often also ice cream.

The ingredients are placed in a specific order. The fruit, beans, and other sweets are placed at the bottom, followed by shaved ice, and then topped with leche flan, ube halaya (mashed purple yam), ice cream, or any combination of the three. Evaporated milk or sometimes coconut milk is poured onto the mixture upon serving. While ube ice cream is often used alongside or as a substitute for ube halaya, and other fruit-based flavors of ice cream may be used, many varieties of halo-halo omit ice cream in general due to its sweetness and creaminess being felt to overload the dessert, which already has milk and various sweetened ingredients, and to throw off the balance of flavors when mixed together. If the halo-halo includes ice cream on top, a common practice is to eat the ice cream first before mixing the other ingredients. There are local and regional varieties of halo-halo throughout the country, which include different and/or additional ingredients than those previously listed, including sweetened wintermelon, durian, and strawberry ice cream, among others.

A similar Visayan dessert is binignit, referred to as "ginataáng halo-halo" in Tagalog ("mixed [ingredients] in coconut milk") and commonly shortened to "ginataán". While it uses a lot of the same ingredients, it is instead usually served hot.

== In popular culture ==
Halo-halo was featured in season 1, episode 2 of Anthony Bourdain: Parts Unknown when its host Anthony Bourdain visited a Jollibee branch, a Filipino fast-food restaurant, in Los Angeles. Bourdain praised the dessert and called it "oddly beautiful". He posted a photo of the dessert on his Twitter account. The show featured the dessert again in season 7, episode 1 when Bourdain learns how Filipinos make the dessert.

Halo-halo was featured as a Quickfire Challenge dish season 4, episode 7 of the American reality television series Top Chef. American contestant Dale Talde prepared the dessert, which featured avocado, mango, kiwifruit, and nuts. Talde was named one of the top three Quickfire Challenge dishes by guest judge Johnny Iuzzinni of Jean Georges. Talde also made the dish in a later episode.

The dessert was featured on a "Delicious Destinations" edition episode of Bizarre Foods.

Halo-halo can be found in a wide range of places, from food stands to 5-star hotels. Filipino fast-food restaurants like Jollibee, Max's, Mang Inasal, and Chowking serve halo-halo.

== See also ==
- Ice buko
- Iskrambol
- Knickerbocker (Philippines)
- Mais con yelo
