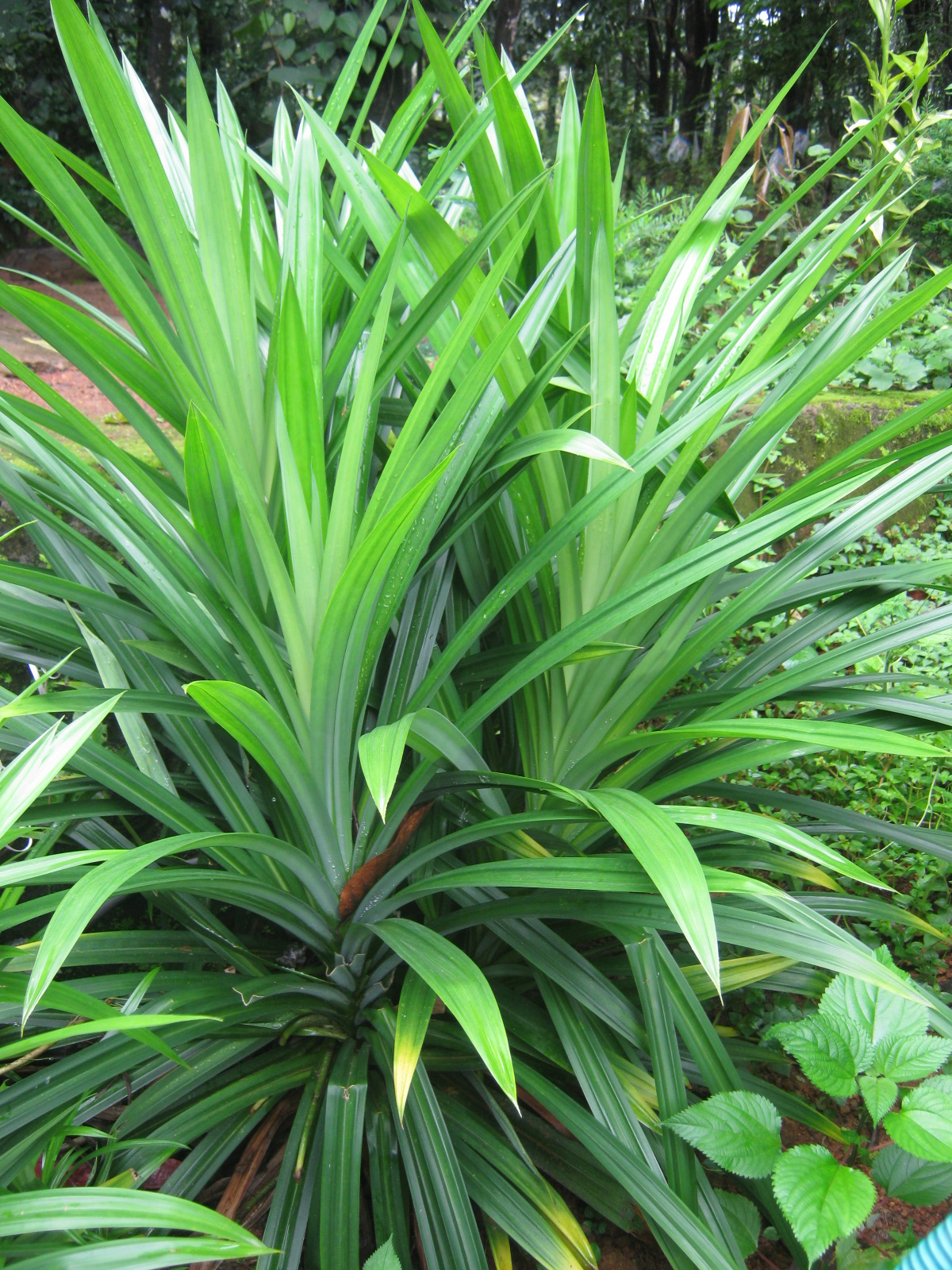

Scientific classification
- Kingdom: Plantae
- Clade: Tracheophytes
- Clade: Angiosperms
- Clade: Monocots
- Order: Pandanales
- Family: Pandanaceae
- Genus: Pandanus
- Species: P. amaryllifolius

Binomial name
- Pandanus amaryllifolius Roxb.

Synonyms
- Pandanus hasskarlii Merr.; Pandanus latifolius Hassk. nom. illeg.; Pandanus odorus Ridl.

= Pandanus amaryllifolius =

Species of tropical plant

Pandanus amaryllifolius is a tropical plant in the Pandanus (screwpine) genus, which is commonly known as pandan (/ˈpændən/ or /ˈpʌndʌn/ ~ /ˈpɑːndɑːn/ PUN-done; Malay: [ˈpandan]). Its fragrant leaves are commonly used for flavoring in the cuisines of Southeast Asia, some South Asian cuisines (such as Sri Lankan cuisine) and in the Hainanese cuisine from China.

== Occurrence and habitat ==
Pandanus amaryllifolius is a true cultigen, and it is believed to have been domesticated in ancient times. It is sterile and can only reproduce vegetatively through suckers or cuttings. It was first described from specimens from the Maluku Islands, and the rare presence of male flowers in these specimens may indicate that it is the origin of the species. However, as no other wild specimens have been found, this is still conjecture. The plant is grown widely throughout Southeast Asia and South Asia.

== Botanical features ==
Though the plant is unknown in the wild, it is widely cultivated. It is an upright, green plant with fan-shaped sprays of long, narrow, blade-like leaves and woody aerial roots. The plant is sterile, with flowers only growing very rarely, and is propagated by cuttings.

The characteristic aroma of pandan is caused by the aroma compound 2-acetyl-1-pyrroline, found in the lower epidermal papillae; the compound gives white bread, jasmine rice, basmati rice and bread flowers Vallaris glabra their typical smell.

== Use ==
=== Culinary ===
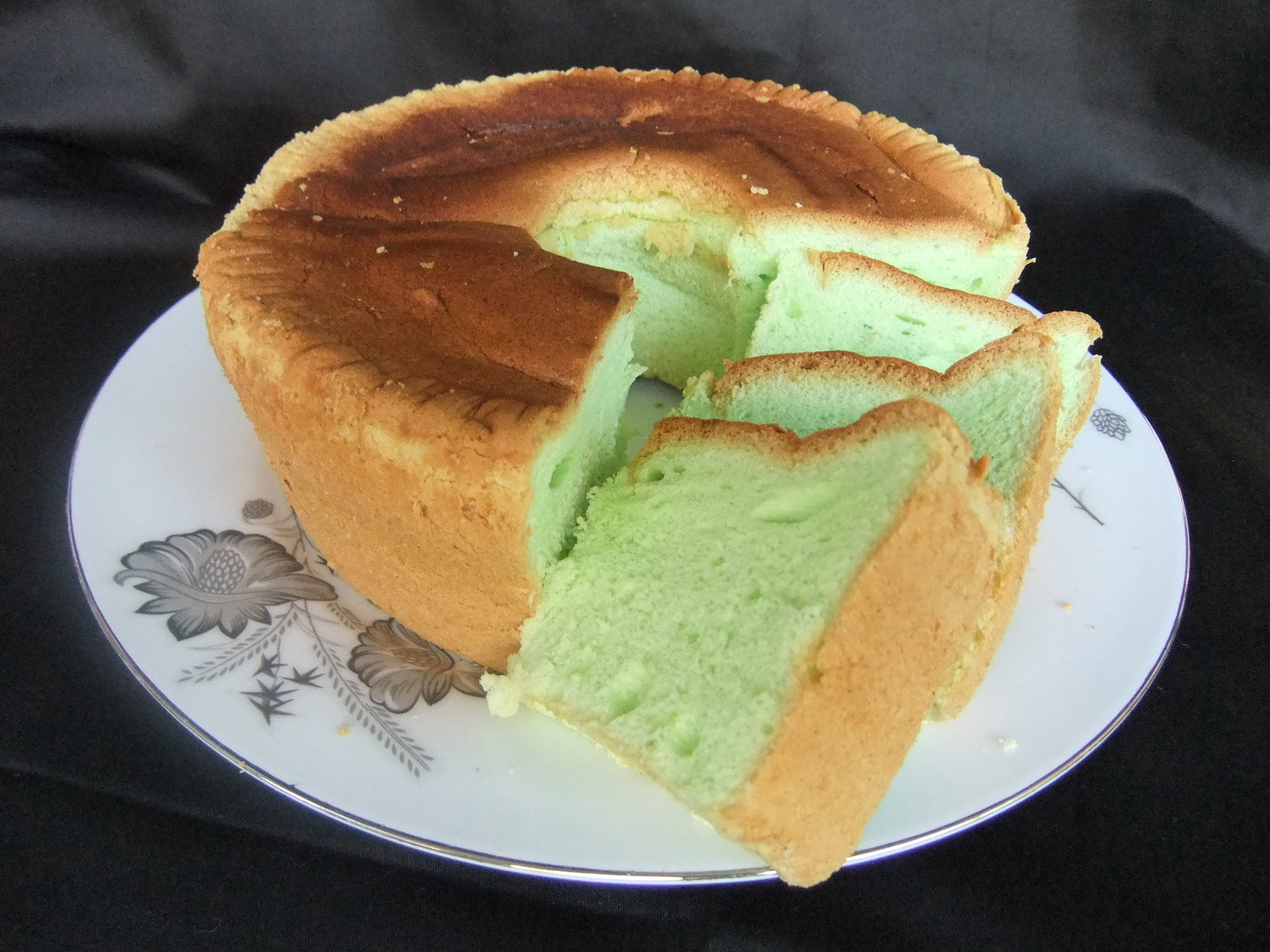
Pandan cake, a light, soft and fluffy chiffon cake, uses pandan leaf as green colouring and flavouring agent.

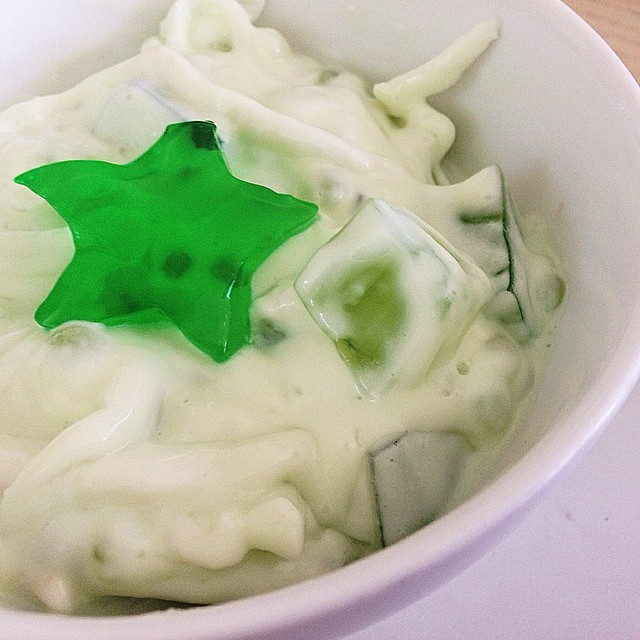
Buko pandan salad from the Philippines mixes gulaman cubes flavored with pandan leaf extracts with young coconut (buko). It is a common flavor combination in the Philippines and can also be found in buko pandan cake.

The taste of pandan has been described as floral, sweet, grassy, as well as like vanilla. It often has a subtle flavor or scent.

In the Thailand, Philippines, Indonesia, Vietnam, Cambodia, Malaysia, and Singapore, it is commonly called pandan or pandan wangi (fragrant pandan). The green juice acquired from its leaf is used extensively in Philippine, Malaysian and Indonesian cuisines as a natural green food colouring and flavouring agent that give a pleasant aroma to traditional cakes such as kakanin and kuih/kue; including klepon, kue putu, dadar gulung, lapis legit, pandan cake, buko pandan salad, and buko pandan cake. A knotted bunch of bruised pandan leaf is also added into fragrant coconut rice to enhance its aroma. In Sri Lanka, it is called rambai (Tamil: ரம்பை) or rampe (Sinhala: රම්පේ ; ) and it is grown almost in every household. Most of the Sri Lankan dishes use these leaves for aroma along with curry leaves.

In India, it is called annapurna leaves; In Odisha, annapurna leaves are used to lend aroma to rice and pithas, in Bangladesh, it is called pulao pata (পোলাও পাতা); and in the Maldives, it is called ran’baa along with the other variety of pandan there (Pandanus fascicularis), and is used to enhance the flavor of pulao, biryani, and sweet coconut rice pudding, or payesh if basmati rice is not used. It acts as a cheap substitute for basmati fragrance, as one can use normal, nonfragrant rice and with pandan the dish tastes and smells like basmati is used. The leaves are used either fresh or dried, and are commercially available in frozen form in Asian grocery stores in places where local climates do not sustain the plant's growth. They have a nutty, botanical fragrance that is used as a flavor enhancer in many Asian cuisines, especially in rice dishes, desserts, and cakes.

The leaves are sometimes steeped in coconut milk, which is then added to the dish. They may be tied in a bunch and cooked with the food. They may be woven into a basket that is used as a pot for cooking rice. Pandan chicken (Thai: ไก่ห่อใบเตย, romanized: kai ho bai toei), is a dish of chicken parts wrapped in pandan leaves and fried. The leaves are also used as a flavoring for desserts such as pandan cake and sweet beverages. Pandan is often used as a flavoring in the Thai dessert khanom thuai. Filipino cuisine uses pandan as a flavoring in some coconut milk-based dishes as well as desserts such as buko pandan. It is also used widely in rice-based pastries such as suman and numerous sweet drinks and desserts.

Pandan leaves and their extract have also been used as a food preservative due to their antibacterial and antifungal properties (particularly against mold).

In October 2017, celebrity chef Nigella Lawson predicted that pandan would displace popular matcha and avocado toast. While the plant’s visibility on social networks, especially in the United Kingdom, increased in 2017, there was also pushback against reports that described Lawson as "discovering" a "new" ingredient, as pandan has been widely used in Asia for a long time.

The green colour extracted from pandan leaves comes from their chlorophyll content which increases in plants that are grown in areas shaded by other trees from direct sunlight. Bottled pandan extract is available in shops and often contains additional green food coloring.

=== Fragrance and traditional medicine ===
The leaves are used in the perfume industry and traditional medicine. P. amaryllifolius essence may substitute for vanilla essence.

Studies have established repellent activity of P. amaryllifolius against American cockroaches (Periplaneta americana L.).

=== Air freshener ===
The leaves possess a pleasant aroma and can be used as a natural air freshener. In Thailand, cab drivers sometimes use pandan for this purpose.

== See also ==
- Domesticated plants and animals of Austronesia
