= Buko salad =

Filipino fruit salad dessert

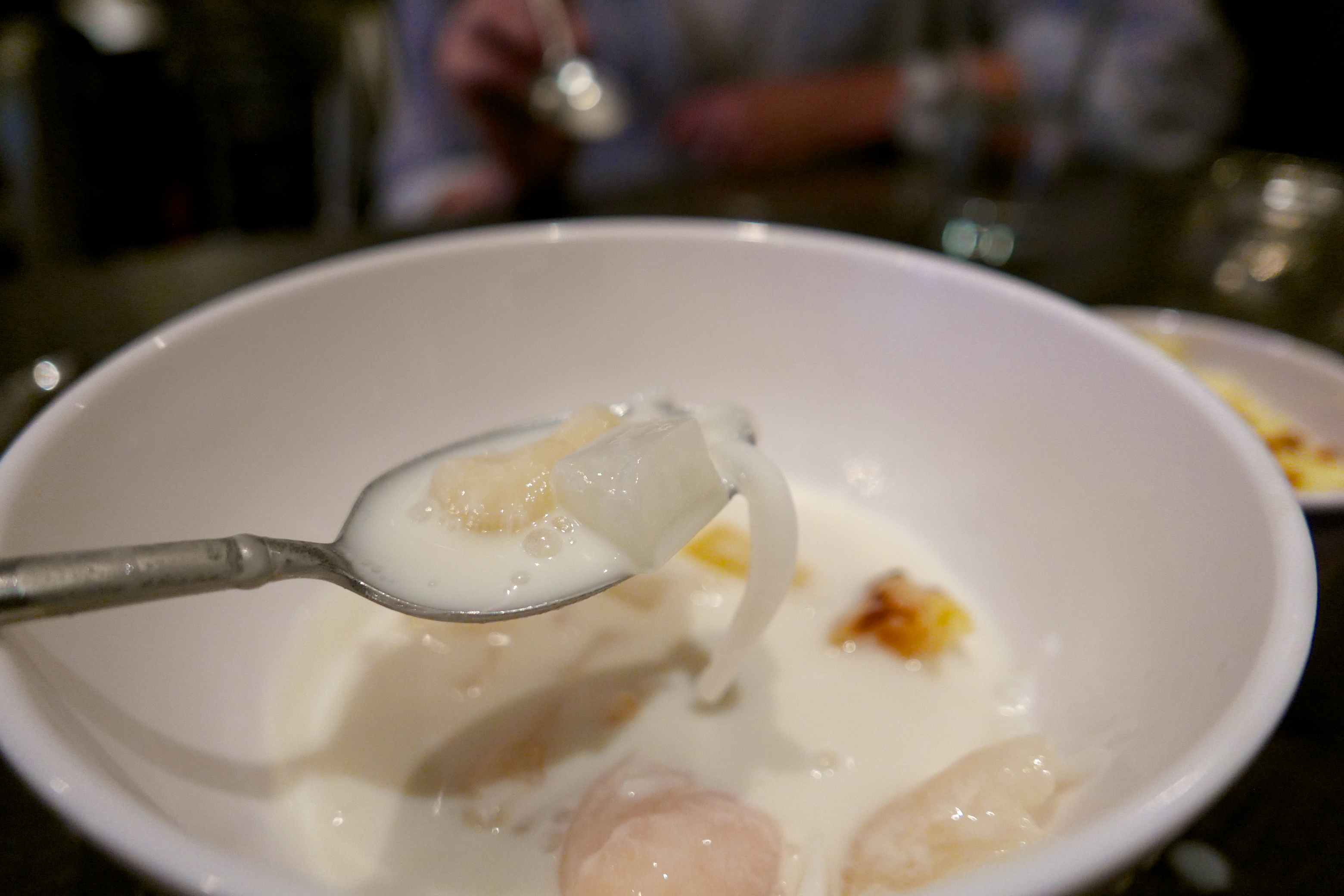
- Buko salad with macapuno, nata de coco, jackfruit, mango, and lychee from Chicago, Illinois
- Alternative names: Young coconut salad
- Course: Dessert
- Place of origin: Philippines
- Serving temperature: Room temperature, chilled
- Main ingredients: young coconut strips, sweetened milk or cream

Buko salad, usually anglicized as young coconut salad, is a Filipino fruit salad dessert made from strips of fresh young coconut (buko) with sweetened milk or cream and various other ingredients. It is one of the most popular and ubiquitous Filipino desserts served during celebrations and fiestas.

By changing the ratio of milk, buko salad desserts can also become beverages (usually chilled or with shaved ice), known generally as samalamig. A frozen dessert version of the dish is known as ice buko.

== Variants ==
Buko salad can have many variations as it can incorporate numerous other ingredients ranging from fruits, gulaman (agar) jellies, sago, kaong, tapioca pearls, nata de coco, macapuno, and others. Some versions however are popular enough to be considered as distinct subtypes. They include:

=== Buko halo ===
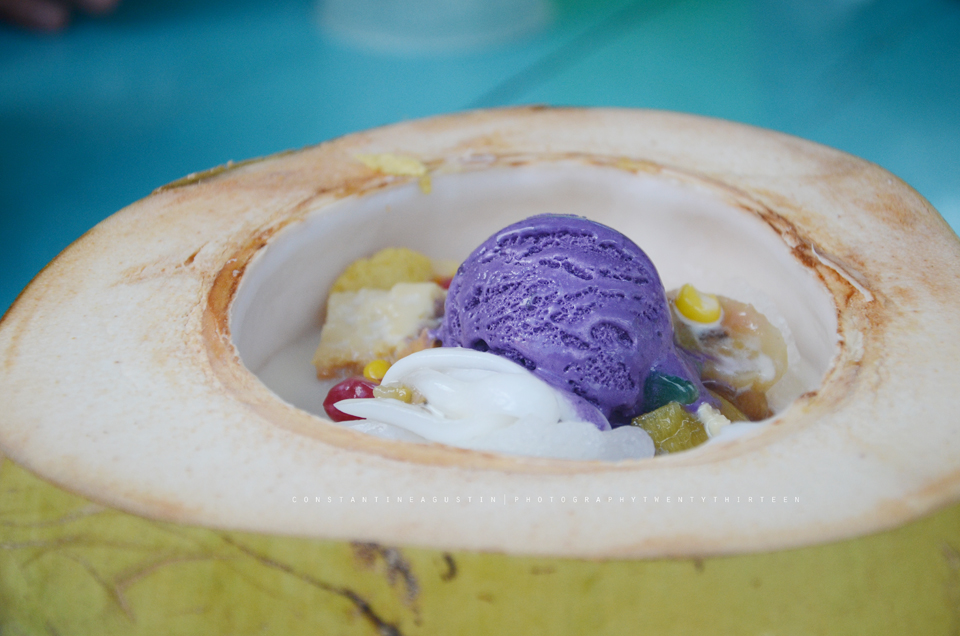
Buko halo, a combination of buko salad and halo-halo from Koronadal City, South Cotabato

Buko halo or buko halo-halo is a combination of buko salad and halo-halo desserts, usually served directly on a coconut shell. It differs from halo-halo in the larger amount of coconut used.

=== Buko melon ===
A variant of buko salad with chunks of cantaloupes and various jelly desserts.

=== Buko pandan ===
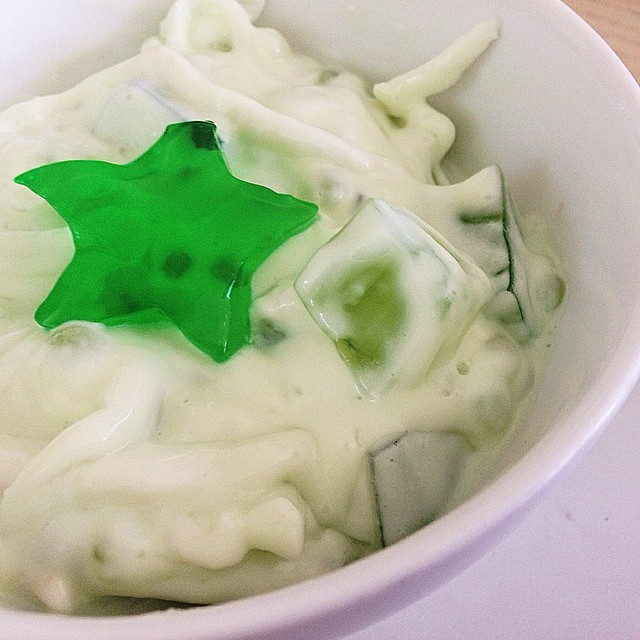
Buko pandan with gulaman cubes flavored with pandan leaf extracts from Baler, Aurora

A popular variant of buko salad whose secondary ingredient are green gulaman (agar) cubes flavored with pandan leaf extracts.

=== Buko lychee ===
Buko lychee is a combination of buko and lychee, a variant of buko salad.

=== Lamaw ===
A popular snack in farming regions because it can be made easily with readily-available ingredients. Made with young coconut meat, milk and sugar (or condensed milk), and saltines or biscuits (also graham crackers). It can also include orange-flavored softdrinks. Usually served on halved coconut shells.

=== Ube macapuno ===
A salad made with another common traditional pairing, that of ube halaya (mashed purple yam) and macapuno.

== See also ==
- Lamaw
- Ice buko
- Buko pie
- Samalamig
- Halo-halo
