= Philippine English vocabulary =

Terms and usages specific to a variety of English spoken in the Philippines

As a historical colony of the United States, the Philippine English lexicon shares most of its vocabulary from American English, but also has loanwords from native languages and Spanish, as well as some usages, coinages, and slang peculiar to the Philippines. Some Philippine English usages are borrowed from or shared with British English or Commonwealth English, for various reasons. Due to the influence of the Spanish language, Philippine English also contains Spanish-derived terms, including Anglicizations, some resulting in false friends, such as salvage and viand. Philippine English also borrows words from Philippine languages, especially native plant and animal names (e.g. ampalaya and balimbing), and cultural concepts with no exact English equivalents such as kilig and bayanihan. Some borrowings from Philippine languages have entered mainstream English, such as abaca and ylang-ylang.

== Words unique to Philippine English ==
Here are some examples of words that are unique to Philippine English:

- Abaca — The Manila hemp.
- Academician – A teacher in a college or higher education institution. Shared with American English. From French.
- Ading — Younger sibling. From Ilocano.
- Agawan base — A team game whose main objective is to touch the base of the opposition without getting tagged. Called washington in Baguio.
- Aggrupation — A group or an organization. Anglicized from Spanish.
- Aircon — Short for air conditioner. This word is shared with British English.
- Ambush interview — surprise interview
- Alcalde — A mayor during the Spanish Colonial period. From Spanish.
- Aling — a title of a woman roughly equivalent to Ms. or Mrs. From Tagalog.
- Amboy — A Filipino perceived to be extremely pro-American. From American and boy.
- Ampalaya — The Momordica charantia or bitter gourd.
- Anak — Child. From Tagalog.
- Anito — ancestor spirit
- Anting-anting — amulet
- Apartelle — A budget hotel based on an apartment building. Also spelled as apartele or apartel.
- Apo — grandchildren or grandparent. From Tagalog.
- Arnis — Martial arts practiced in the Philippines employing sticks, bladed weapons, and bare hands.
- Asianovela — Any television drama series made in Asia.
- Ate — older sister From Tagalog.
- Atis — The Annona squamosa or sugar apple.
- Awardee — One who is given an award. Shared with American English.
- Bagoong — fermented fish or shrimp paste
- Bagyo — A typhoon. This word is a borrowing from Philippine Spanish.
- Bakya — referring to the lower socioeconomic class
- balete — A Philippine tree
- Balikbayan — A Filipino returning to the Philippines after spending time in another country.
- Balikbayan box — A carton shipped or brought to the Philippines from another country by a Filipino who has been living overseas, a balikbayan, typically containing items such as foods, clothing, toys, and household products.
- Balimbing — The star fruit; the fruit of Averrhoa carambola. From Tagalog. In Philippine politics, it refers to a turncoat.
- Balisong — A folding pocket knife from the Batangas, Philippines.
- Ballpen — Short for ball point pen.
- Balut — Asian street food consisting of a developing duck embryo boiled alive and eaten in the shell. Either from Malay or Tagalog.
- Banaba — A Southeast Asian tree with medicinal leaves.
- Banana cue — A Philippine snack made by coating a deep-fried banana in caramelized brown sugar, served on a skewer.
- Banca — A dug-out canoe.
- bangkal — A Philippine tree
- Baon — packed lunch or money taken to school, work, or a journey. From Tagalog.
- Barangay — The smallest local government unit in the Philippines. From Tagalog.
- Barkada — a group of friends
- Barong – shortened form of barong tagalog. From Tagalog.
- Barong tagalog — A formal shirt made of piña; the national dress shirt of the Philippines. From Tagalog.
- Baro’t saya — National dress of the Philippines worn by Filipino women. From Tagalog.
- Barrio — A hamlet; a rural barangay or neighborhood. From Spanish.
- Basi — An Ilocano fermented alcoholic beverage or wine made with sugarcane juice.
- Batchmate — A person in a graduating class.
- Bayanihan — Mutual cooperation for the public good. From Tagalog.
- Bedspacer — A person who rents a bed in a shared room or dormitory.
- Behest loan — A loan granted to individuals or corporations favored by a powerful government official despite their lack of qualifications to receive such a loan. It is a mechanism for graft and political corruption particularly used in authoritarian regimes, where financial institutions such as banks are placed under intense pressure to approve such loans "at the behest" of high officials. The term has historically been most associated with the cronies of 10th president Ferdinand Marcos, although other officials have also been accused of engaging in the practice.
- Bibingka — A Philippine type of baked rice cake.
- Bihon — A Philippine type of noodle.
- Bodega — A storage room or storehouse. From Spanish.
- Blocktime — Units of air time sold by a broadcaster sold for use by another entity, often an advertiser or politician.
- Bolo — a long machete-like heavy knife
- Bond paper — writing paper
- Bongga – extravagant; flamboyant; impressive; stylish. From Tagalog.
- Boodle fight — A large communal meal where food is placed directly on top of banana leaves across a long table where diners typically eat standing with their hands or using plastic gloves usually without cutlery. Initially adopted from the U.S. Military Academy by the Philippine Military Academy, which spread across the AFP (Armed Forces of the Philippines) before spreading to the populace.
- Bring house — Take-out food; transliterated from Tagalog dala sa bahay.
- Brown joke — toilet humor; jokes about excretory functions.
- Brownout — A power outage. This is shared with Hong Kong English and Australian English.
- Buko — coconut. From Tagalog.
- Buko juice — coconut juice
- Bunso — Youngest sibling or child. From Tagalog.
- Buri — A species of palm and its fiber.
- Calachuchi — The Plumeria rubra.
- Camote — sweet potato
- Carinderia — A small restaurant, typically in a market or roadside, serving Filipino dishes. From Philippine Spanish.
- Carless — Having no car.
- Carnap — To steal a motor vehicle.
- Carnapper — A person who steals a motor vehicle.
- Cartolina — A large sheet of colored paper. From Portuguese.
- Cash gift — Cash remittance.
- Cedula — originally, tax receipt; residence certificate. From Spanish.
- Centavo — cent. From Spanish.
- Center island — A barrier or structure on the median strip dividing opposing lanes of a road. It is typically lined with plants, trees, streetlights, and/or pillars supporting road or railroad overpasses.
- Chancing — make sexual advances
- Charter change/Cha-cha — Processes used to amend the constitution of the Philippines; constitutional reform.
- Chika — stories; light gossip. From Tagalog.
- Chinita — A person who has squinty, Asian eyes.
- City folk — Someone who lives in a city.
- Coconut milk — coconut water
- Colgate — Generalized trademark for toothpaste.
- Colorum — Unlicensed operation of public utility vehicles. Corrupted from Latin.
- Comfort room — A bathroom or a restroom. Abbreviated as CR usually in speech.
- Community quarantine — A cordon sanitaire or stay-at-home order. Devised by the IATF-EID to distinguish a series of lockdowns during the COVID-19 pandemic from military lockdowns resulting from civil disorder or armed conflict, the latter being associated with Martial law. Compare with Malaysian English movement control order or Singaporean "circuit breaker" measure.
- Compadre — A friend or close associate. From Spanish.
- Compañero — A companion. From Spanish.
- Condotel — A budget hotel based on a condominium.
- Cotton bud — A cotton swab. This word is shared with British English.
- Course — Academic degree. Shared with British English partly due to the Spanish word curso and its borrowed form in many Philippine languages.
- Cutex — Nail polish. Genericized from a popular brand of nail polish currently owned by Revlon.
- Dean's lister — A person awarded a dean's list
- Despedida party — A farewell party. The word despedida is a borrowing from Spanish. Can simply be called a despedida.
- Dirty kitchen — A kitchen where everyday cooking is done by household staff, as distinct from a kitchen that is purely for show or for special use by the owner of the house. Also a kitchen, sometimes auxiliary or situated outside the house, used primarily for preparing messy and smelly dishes or cooking with firewood or charcoal. This is also used for cooking for a large group of people and found in some West Asian countries.
- Dirty ice cream — Local ice cream often made using coconut milk and sold by street hawkers.
- Dormmate — A person who stays at the same dormitory with someone.
- Downy — Generalized trademark for fabric softener.
- Duhat — The Java plum or Syzygium cumini.
- Dutertard — A derogatory term for a fanatic supporter of Rodrigo Duterte.
- Eat-all-you-can — all-you-can-eat
- Economic plunder — The embezzlement of public funds.
- Endo — A labor contracting system where workers are hired by employment agencies to work for a specific period of time until being replaced and prohibited from being re-hired. Coined from end of contract, as used on the contracts given to workers under the system.
- Ensaimada — A Filipino spiral-shaped pastry topped with grated cheese and sugar. From Spanish.
- Estafa — The legal term for fraud. This term is borrowed from Spanish.
- Fantaserye — fantasy series
- Filipinism — Filipino nationalism
- Fiscal — A public prosecutor or a district attorney. From Spanish.
- Fiscalize — To serve as check and balance.
- Five-six/5-6 — A moneylending scheme stereotypically associated with Indian nationals, especially Punjabis. Named after the high interest rate where ₱6 must be returned if ₱5 is borrowed.
- Flyover — An overpass. This word is shared with British English. The term overpass, which is shared with American English, is also used.
- Gobernadorcillo — A municipal mayor during the Spanish colonial period. From Spanish.
- Government-owned and controlled corporation — A state-owned enterprise that conducts both commercial and non-commercial activity.
- Grease money — A small bribe.
- Guyabano — The soursop. From Tagalog.
- Hacienda — a large estate. From Spanish.
- Hacendero — A landlord or estate owner. From Spanish.
- Halo-halo — A Philippine dessert consisting of a mixture of shaved ice and milk with various boiled sweet beans and fruits, served cold in a tall glass or bowl.
- Handcarry — carry-on luggage
- Hilot — A traditional Filipino healing practice involving massage. From Tagalog.
- Holdupper — One who carries a robbery at gunpoint.
- Hurado — panel of judges in talent/musical competitions. From Tagalog.
- Ylang-ylang — A Philippine tree.
- Ilustrado — A wealthy and elite Filipino during the Spanish colonial period. From Spanish.
- Illustration board – A piece of hard paper or thin cardboard that can be drawn or painted on.
- Imeldific — Something ostentatious or in bad taste. Named after Imelda Marcos.
- Inihaw — grilled or roasted food. From Tagalog.
- Ipil — A Philippine and Pacific island tree (Intsia bijuga) yielding a valuable brown dye and having a very hard and durable dark wood.
- Istambay — Slang for a bystander. From Tagalog.
- Japayuki — A Filipina who travels to Japan to work as an entertainer, with implications of prostitution.
- Jeepney — A vehicle used as public transport in the Philippines, originally made from US military Jeeps left over from World War II and well known for their flamboyant decoration and crowded seating.
- Joy — Generalized trademark for dishwashing liquid.
- Jueteng — An illegal numbers game lottery, using a tombolá container that is spun or a receptacle, sometimes shaped like a bottle or small-necked phial, that is shaken with the winning number from 1 to 37 on a ball or raffle ticket paper drawn after all bets are submitted. From Hokkien. The gambling game traces back to China and has been played since Early Ming Dynasty to Late Qing Dynasty times starting in Coastal China and spreading across Inland China and abroad and finally banned last in China since 1949. It has been made illegal in the Philippines in 1907 under American rule. In the 21st century, it is still played illegally in secret in China (and the Philippines) under the informal economy of both countries, but government-run lotteries are used to regulate and compete against the illegal private practice.
- Kilig — Romantic thrill. From Tagalog.
- Kinder — A clipping of kindergarten.
- Kababayan — fellow Filipinos. From Tagalog.
- Kare-kare — A Philippine dish.
- Kikay — A girl or woman interested in fashion and beauty products; a flirtatious girl or woman; girly. From Tagalog.
- Kikay kit — A soft case in which a woman's toiletries and cosmetics are stored.
- Kleenex – Generalized trademark for toilet paper.
- Kundol — winter melon
- Kuya — older brother. From Tagalog.
- Lambanog — A traditional Filipino distilled palm liquor.
- Lambing — sweetness. From Tagalog.
- Lanzones — The fruit of the Lansium domesticum.
- Lapu-lapu — The brown-marbled grouper.
- Leche flan — A Philippine dessert.
- Lechon — A roasted suckling pig. From Spanish.
- Lola — grandmother. From Tagalog.
- Lolo — grandfather. From Tagalog.
- Loveteam — A pair of actors or television presenters who are promoted as a romantic couple. From love and team.
- Lukban — pomelo
- Lumpia — spring rolls
- Macapuno — A coconut sport or a tree propagated from such sport; a naturally occurring mutant coconut with an abnormal development of the endocarp, prized for its soft coconut meat. From Spanish.
- Macho dancer — A male stripper who works in a strip club.
- Maestro/Maestra — teacher. From Spanish.
- Magic sugar — sodium cyclamate
- Maintenance medicine – chronic medication or maintenance therapy (medication used to prevent chronic disease)
- Mang — a title of a man roughly equivalent to Mr. From Tagalog.
- Manong — an older man. From Ilocano.
- Masteral — master’s degree
- Merienda — snack time. From Spanish.
- Mineral water — Bottled water
- Molave — A Philippine tree
- Monthsary — A monthly celebration of an anniversary or important event.
- Morena — tanned skin
- Musang — A cat-like animal in South Asia and Africa.
- Narra — Any of the pantropical genus Pterocarpus of trees in the family Fabaceae, but especially Pterocarpus indicus.
- Nata de piña — jelly-like pineapple juice product
- Ninang — godmother
- Ninong — godfather
- Nipa hut — A kind of stilt house indigenous to the cultures of the Philippines.
- Noynoying/Noy-noying — Colloquial neologism for lazing around. After the nickname of former president Benigno Aquino III.
- Nuisance candidate — A person who is deemed a frivolous or insincere candidate for elective office.
- Off-day — Day off; a day away from work.
- Onion-skinned — Overly sensitive. Calqued from Tagalog balat-sibuyas.
- Ocular inspection — An inspection of a place using the naked eye.
- Original Pilipino Music/OPM — Any musical composition created by a Filipino, whether the lyrics are in Filipino, English, or in any other language or dialect, regardless of the actual genre.
- Padre — father. From Spanish.
- Palay — Rice prior to husking. From Tagalog.
- Pampers — Generalized trademark for disposable diapers
- Pandan — The Pandanus tectorius.
- Pan de sal — Salted bread. From Spanish.
- Pancit — A Filipino dish of stir-fried egg noodles with meat, vegetables, soy sauce and other seasonings. From Chinese.
- Panciteria — A restaurant typically serving Filipino noodles.
- Pasalubong — A Filipino tradition of giving gifts or souvenirs to family or friends after being away for a period of time. From Tagalog.
- Patis — Fish sauce which is a by-product of bagoong.
- Pentel pen — Genericized trademark for color marker.
- Pili — A Philippine tree and its edible nut.
- Pinakbet — A Philippine dish.
- Pinoy — A Filipino person. Popularized by the song "Ako'y Isang Pinoy".
- Plantilla — Faculty assignment; a permanent or regular position in the public sector. From Spanish.
- Plate number — License plate
- Po — Philippine word for courtesy and respect. From Tagalog.
- Presidencia — A town hall (especially during the Spanish colonial period). From Spanish.
- Presidentiable — A likely or confirmed candidate for President. First used in the 1970s.
- Pulutan — Food eaten as an accompaniment to alcoholic drinks. From Tagalog.
- Puto — A Filipino steamed rice cake.
- PX goods — An import-restricted imported grocery item. Named after the Post Exchange due to the initially illegal import trade in the then-US military bases in the Philippines, particularly Pampanga's Clark Air Base and Subic Naval Base in Subic Bay. Its illicit trade died out when trade was liberalized around the 1990s, opening the door for legal freeport zones in Clark and Subic Bay for more legalized imported goods in duty-free stores and supermarkets instead.
- PX store — A store that sells import-restricted imported grocery items. See PX Goods above.
- Querida — A mistress. From Spanish.
- Re(-)electionist — Someone who runs for re(-)election. Anglicized from Spanish reeleccionista.
- Red-tagging — Red-baiting
- Rest and Go — massage chair
- Rubber shoes — sneakers
- Sala — living room
- Statement of assets, liabilities, and net worth — An annual document that all de jure government workers in the Philippines, whether regular or temporary, must complete and submit attesting under oath to their total assets and liabilities, including businesses and financial interests, that make up their net worth.
- Sampaguita — The Arabian jasmine.
- Sando — A sleeveless shirt. From Tagalog. The Tagalog term is possibly from Japanese.
- Santan — The Ixora coccinea.
- Santol — The fruit of Sandoricum koetjape.
- Sari-sari store — A small variety (or sundry) store. The term sari-sari is from Tagalog,
- Sebastopol helmet - A tall sun helmet used by policemen during the colonial period. It originates from Russian sailors from Sevastopol who wore such sun helmets when they visited the Philippines.
- Senatoriable — A likely or confirmed candidate for being a senator.
- Sharon — Wrapping leftover foods as many as guests could from any kind of occasion or gathering such as birthday or wedding parties, going home with them. Named after singer-actress-host Sharon Cuneta who sang her hit "Bituwing Walang Ningning" from her 1985 soundtrack album from the movie of the same name, which contains the lyrics in its chorus "Balutin mo ako ng liwanag ng iyong pagmamahal" (lit. "Wrap me with the light of your love"). Balutin means "to wrap" in Tagalog, from the root word "balot" ("wrap").
- Sign pen — Generalized trademark for a pen for signing documents.
- Sinigang — A Philippine stew. From Tagalog.
- Sisig — A Philippine dish.
- Slow rock — Any rock band of any genre (usually glam metal bands) associated with slower-paced songs, i.e. power ballads.
- Solon — A legislator or a lawmaker.
- Stampita — A small religious picture. From Spanish.
- Suki — a regular customer. From Tagalog.
- Supermart — A supermarket.
- Tabo — A small plastic or metal water dipper typically used for washing. From Tagalog.
- Taglish — A bilingual English-Tagalog code-switching phenomenon mainly encountered in Metro Manila.
- Talahib — The Saccharum spontaneum.
- Talisay — The Indian almond or Tropical almond.
- Tapa — sliced dried meat
- Teleserye — television drama series
- Tita — aunt; also used as a form of address for an older woman. From Tagalog.
- Tito — uncle; also used as a form of address for an older man. From Tagalog.
- Trainor — Misspelling of trainer.
- Trapo — A corrupt politician. From a clipping of traditional politician and Tagalog trapo (dirty rag).
- Tricycle — A type of motorized vehicle consisting of a motorcycle and a passenger cab attached to it.
- Tuba — An alcoholic drink.
- Tupperware — Generalized trademark for food containers.
- Turbo broiler — tabletop convection oven
- Turco Anti-rust paint. Genericized trademark from a Spanish brand.
- Turon — A Philippine street food consisting of ripened bananas wrapped in spring roll wrappers.
- Typewriting — writing paper
- Ube — The Dioscorea alata or purple yam.
- Unli — Clipping of unlimited. Usually found in offers and promos such as unli-text or unli-rice.
- Videoke — A form of entertainment popular in clubs, at parties, etc, in which individual members of the public sing along to pre-recorded or MIDI instrumental versions of popular songs, the lyrics of which are displayed for the singer on a screen in time with the music. Blend of video and karaoke. This term was coined in the 1990s.
- Xerox — Genericized trademark for photocopier
- Yakal — The Shorea astylosa, a tree endemic to the Philippines.
- Yaya — A female employee who looks after the employers' children.
- Yellowtard — A derogatory term that refers to a supporter of Benigno Aquino III or the Liberal Party.

== Meanings unique to Philippine English ==
Here are some examples of words with meanings unique to Philippine English:

- Accomplish — To fill out a form. (Original meaning: to finish successfully)
- Advanced — Indicates that a clock or watch is ahead of the standard time. (Original meaning: state-of-the-art)
- Blowout — To treat somebody with a meal; a birthday party. (Original meaning: a sudden puncturing of a tire)
- Bold — erotic; titillating; sexual (Original meaning: brave; daring)
- Canteen – An eatery within a school or factory. Shared with British English. (Original meaning: a small portable flask or bottle for storing water or beverages)
- Commute — To take public transportation. (Original meaning: to regularly travel from one's home to one's workplace or school, or vice versa)
- Computer shop – An internet cafe. (Original meaning: A shop that sells computers)
- Cong — Abbreviation of congressman/-person/-woman (Original: Congress)
- Dialect – Any of the languages of the Philippines other than Tagalog. The definition partly comes from inaccurate vocabulary used in literature during the American period (1898–1946). (Original meaning: a variety of a standard language)
- Double-deck — A bunk bed. (Original meaning: something that has two decks or levels one above the other, usually a bus or tram).
- Duster — A loose dress worn in (and near) one’s house. (Original meaning: a cleaning tool)
- Gets — Slang for understand. Commonly used in Taglish. (Original meaning: to have, achieve, obtain something)
- Gimmick — A night out with one's friends. (Original meaning: a trick or ploy)
- Go down — get off a vehicle (Original meaning: To descend, decline, or to fail)
- Green — Indicates that something has sexual connotations. (Original meaning: of a green hue; with a hue which is of grass or leaves)
- High blood — enraged, exasperated, furious, agitated, flustered. (Original meaning: hypertension)
- Hostess — A prostitute. (Original meaning: female host)
- Jingle — To urinate. It is not clear whether the now-defunct Jingle Chordbook magazine popular in the 1970s–1980s used the urinating Cupid on its masthead logo before the slang term came into circulation, thus inspiring the slang term's conception and street usage, or whether the image was inspired by the slang term. (Original meaning: to make a light tinkling sound)
- Load — prepaid phone credits (Original meaning: a burden)
- Marketing — Shopping for daily needs. (Original meaning: buying and/or selling in a market or advertising)
- Middle name — maternal surname or maiden name, in which Filipino full names were patterned from the Spanish & American naming conventions by sorting first the given name then a maternal surname before marriage and lastly, the paternal surname. (Original meaning: second given name)
- Motel — a love hotel; a hotel usually for premarital or extramarital sex. (Original meaning: motorist’s hotel)
- Nosebleed — mental overload (Original meaning: hemorrhage from the nose)
- Number two — mistress (Original meaning: the number after 1)
- One-fourth – a small sheet of pad paper used for writing the answers to school quizzes (Original meaning: a quarter)
- Open — To turn on (an appliance, for example). Shared with Malaysian English. (Original meaning: to make something accessible or allow for passage by moving from a shut position)
- Plastic — two-faced; insincere (Original meaning: a synthetic, solid, hydrocarbon-based polymer, whether thermoplastic or thermosetting)
- Province – Any place in the Philippines outside Metro Manila. (Original meaning: major administrative subdivision within a country or a sovereign state)
- Ref — Clipping of refrigerator. (Original meaning: clipping of referee)
- Rotonda — A traffic circle. From Spanish. English rotunda also in use. (Original meaning: round building)
- Rugby — Generalized trademark for contact cement or rubber cement. (Original meaning: a form of football using an oval ball)
- Salvage — To perform summary execution. Possibly started to surface during the Martial law era. From Spanish salvaje. (Original meaning: to rescue)
- Sorbetes — A Philippine ice cream made from coconut milk or carabao milk. From Spanish. (Original meaning: sorbet)
- Stateside — Used to describe imported items, especially goods. (Original meaning: being in, coming from, or going to the United States)
- Topnotcher — Someone who finishes or is listed by name. Also top-notcher. (Original meanings: something excellent or first-rate; someone regarded as the best in an activity or occupation)
- Traffic — Heavy traffic; congestion. Possibly influenced by trapik. Follows a trend in Philippine English to turn nouns into adjectives. (Original meaning: vehicular flow)
- Viand — A side dish or a rice topping. Anglicization of Spanish vianda. Used to translate the Tagalog word ulam. Considered a misnomer. (Original meaning: item of food)

== Others ==
- CR — comfort room; bathroom; restroom
- DH — domestic helper; a maid
- DOM — dirty old man; a rich man
- Dra. — female doctor
- EDSA — Epifanio de los Santos Avenue. It used to be called Highway 54. It was the place of the People Power Revolution in 1986.
- EJK — extra judicial killing
- GOCC — A government-owned and controlled corporation or a state-owned enterprise. See the entry for the non-abbreviated form above.
- GRO — guest relations officer; bargirl
- KJ — killjoy
- OA — overacting
- OFW — Overseas Filipino Worker
- QC — Quezon City
- SALN — Statement of Assets, Liabilities, and Net Worth. See the entry of the said term above.
- Actually — Used to express agreement.
- Bad shot — Used to express frustration
- Bad trip — Used to express that someone is not in a good mood.
- Bahala na — Expressing the fatalistic attitude that things are out of one's control and whatever will happen will happen. From Tagalog.
- Mabuhay — Long live. From Tagalog.
- KKB — Abbreviation of Tagalog Kaniya-kaniyang bayad (lit. 'each one pays their own').
- Power — Cheer used to express support. Usually found in the phrase More power to you!.
- Sanaol — Taglish slang; used to express hope for an individual's success to spread to others; also spelled sana all.
- Sayang — Used to express sympathy or regret. From Tagalog.
- Time first — time out
- Yehey — Used to express joy or elation. Possibly a blend of yey and hey.
- Feeling close — Refers to a person who acts too friendly to someone but is not a friend.
- Utang na loob — A Tagalog phrase which is a Filipino cultural trait that may roughly mean an internal debt of gratitude or a sense of obligation to reciprocate.
- Fall in line — To line up.
- Blocktime — Units of air time sold by a broadcaster sold for use by another entity, often an advertiser or politician.
- Caban — A grain measure equal to 3.47 cubic feet. From Spanish. Also spelled cavan.
- Chupa — A historical unit of volume equivalent to around 375 ml.
