= Philippine English =

Variety of English language

- Filipino English
- Wikang Ingles sa Pilipinas
- Native to: Philippines
- Ethnicity: spoken by vast majority of Filipino population
- Speakers: L1: 200,000 (2020); L2: 52 million (2020)
- Language family: Indo-European: Germanic; West Germanic; Ingvaeonic; Anglo-Frisian; Anglic; English; American English; Philippine English
- Early forms: Old English: Middle English; Early Modern English; Modern English; 19th century American English
- Writing system: Latin (English alphabet); Unified English Braille

Official status
- Official language in: Philippines

Language codes
- ISO 639-3: –
- Glottolog: phil1246
- IETF: en-PH

Speech examples
Sound file of a man and woman speaking with Philippine English accents.

Philippine English is the variety of English spoken in the Philippines. It is based on American English but mixed with Filipino culture, accent, and words. Examples are saying "CR" instead of "restroom" and "open the light" instead of "turn on the light". English is taught in schools as one of the two official languages of the country, the other being Filipino. Due to the influx of Philippine English teachers overseas, Philippine English is also becoming the prevalent variety of English being learned in East Asia and Southeast Asia as taught by Filipino teachers in various countries such as South Korea, Japan, and Thailand, among others. Due to the highly multilingual and bilingual nature of the Philippines, code-switching such as Taglish (Tagalog-infused English) and Bislish (English infused with any of the Bisayan languages) is prevalent across domains from casual settings to formal situations. Philippine English is similar and related to American English but has been highly nativized in form. It continues to grow and reflect the unique culture and identity of the Filipino people.

== History ==
Until 1898, English was originally a foreign language in the Philippines used by British and American merchants, foreign residents, and a limited number of Filipinos who studied abroad or received formal instruction. English was formally introduced as an optional language subject in selected Philippine educational institutions following a Spanish royal decree of January 9, 1865. Among the institutions offering English instruction were the University of Santo Tomas and the Ateneo Municipal de Manila. Several Filipinos, including José Rizal, acquired knowledge of English before 1898. However, English remained uncommon among the general population, while Spanish was the principal language of colonial administration and formal education.

With the defeat of Spain following the Spanish–American War led to the short-lived Philippine Independence movement, which established the First Philippine Republic, and eventually the Philippine–American War, the creation of Philippine English was a result of American colonization and was arguably one of the fastest to develop in the postcolonial world. Its origins as an English language spoken by a large segment of the Philippine population can be traced to the American introduction of public education, taught in the English medium of instruction. This was marked by the arrival of the Thomasites in 1901, immediately during re-colonization after the Philippine Revolution in the late 19th century up to the early 1900s. After a tumultuous period of colonial transition, Filipino leaders and elites, and the American colonial government alike began discussing the formation of a Philippine national language. The retained high ethnolinguistic diversity of the new colony was due to a low penetration of Spanish under Spain's rule. Spanish was limited to a medium of instruction for the landed elites and gentry. By the end of Spanish colonization and the Philippine–American War in 1903, only 10% of the colonial population could speak Spanish.

The lingering effects of Spanish amongst the general population nevertheless had notable effects on the lexical development of many Philippine languages, and even Philippine English, in the form of Hispanisms. Tagalog was selected as the basis for a national language in 1937, and has since remained so. It was re-labelled as Pilipino in 1959, and Filipino in 1987. With the successful establishment of American-style public education with English as a consequential medium, more than 20% of the Philippine population was reported to be able to understand and speak English just before the turn of the mid-20th century. This meteoric growth was sustained post-World War II, much further through Philippine mass media (e.g., newsprint, radio, television), where English also became the dominant language, and by the ratification into the current Philippine Constitution in 1987, both Filipino and English were declared co-official languages, while removing Spanish as an official language. In 2025, the Philippines was ranked 28th worldwide (among the 123 countries and territories ranked) in the EF English Proficiency Index, an index ranking English proficiency among non-native English-speaking regions of the world. In the same report, it was ranked 2nd in Asia next only to Malaysia.

Today Philippine English, as formally called based on the World Englishes framework of linguist Braj Kachru, is a recognized variety of English with its distinct lexical, phonological, and grammatical features (with considerable variations across socioeconomic groups and level of education being predictors of English proficiency in the Philippines). As the English language became highly embedded in Philippine society, it was only a matter of time before the language was indigenized to the point that it became differentiated from English varieties found in the United States, United Kingdom, or elsewhere. This, along with the formal introduction of the World Englishes (WE) framework to English language scholars in the Philippines, opened the floodgates to research on this new emerging English, which has since been branded as such as Philippine English.

== Usage ==
Philippine laws and court decisions, with extremely rare exceptions, are written solely in English. English is also used in higher education, religious affairs, print and broadcast media, and business. Most well-educated Filipinos are bilingual and speak English as one of their languages. For highly technical subjects such as nursing, medicine, computing and mathematics, English is the preferred medium for textbooks and communication. Very few would prefer highly technical books in either Filipino or the regional language. Movies and TV shows in English are usually not dubbed in most cable channels except a few such as Tagalized Movie Channel.

Because English is part of the curricula from primary to secondary education, many Filipinos write and speak in fluent Philippine English, although there might be differences in pronunciation. Most schools in the Philippines, however, are staffed by teachers who are speakers of Philippine English and hence notable differences from the American English from which it was derived are observable.

=== In the services sector ===
The abundant supply of English speakers and competitive labor costs enabled the Philippines to become a choice destination for foreign companies wishing to establish call centers and other outsourcing. English proficiency sustains a major call center industry and in 2005, America Online had 1,000 people in what used to be the US Air Force's Clark Air Base in Angeles City answering ninety percent of their global e-mail inquiries. Citibank does its global ATM programming in the country, and Procter & Gamble has over 400 employees in Makati doing back office work for their Asian operations including finance, accounting, human resources and payments processing.

An influx of foreign students, principally from South Korea, has also led to growth in the number of English language learning centers, especially in Metro Manila, Baguio, Metro Cebu and Metro Bacolod.

== Positioning ==
In 2003, Edgar W. Schneider defined a Dynamic Model of the evolution of Postcolonial Englishes, positioning Philippine English in Phase 3, Nativization. In 2016, Ariane Macalinga Borlongan argued in a research article that Philippine English had met the parameters set for repositioning into Phase 4, Endonormative stabilization.

== Features ==
Philippine English traditionally follows American English spelling and grammar while it shares some similarity to Commonwealth English. Philippine English follows the latter when it comes to punctuation as well as date notations. For example, a comma almost never precedes the final item in an enumeration (much like the AP Stylebook and other style guides in English-language journalism generally).

- Dates are often read with a cardinal instead of an ordinal number. (Example: January 1 is pronounced as "January one" instead of "January first" or "the first of January".)
- Tautologies like redundancy and pleonasm are common despite the emphasis on avoiding them, stressing brevity and simplicity in making sentences; they are common to many speakers, especially among the older generations. The possible explanation is that the English language teachers who came to the Philippines were taught old-fashioned grammar, thus they spread that style to the students they served.
  - Examples are "At this point in time" and ".. will be the one ..." (or "... will be the one who will ...") instead of "now" and "... will ..." respectively - e.g., "I will be the one who will go ...", rather than "I will go ...".
- Collective nouns are generally singular in construction, e.g., my family is doing well as opposed to my family are doing well or the group was walking as opposed to the group were walking following American English.
- Mass noun and non-count nouns are sometimes treated as count nouns in Philippine English. Words treated as mass nouns such furniture and imagery in native-speaker English varieties may be treated as count nouns (with plural furnitures and imageries) in Philippine English due to grammatical influence from Philippine languages. Similar tendencies also exist in non-native-speaker English varieties such as Indian English.
- The past tense and past participles of the verbs learn, spell and smell are often regular (learned, spelled, smelled) in Philippine English. These are also the case in American English.
- River follows the name of the river in question following American English, e.g., Pasig River, rather than the British convention of coming before the name, e.g., River Thames.
- Abbreviations such as Mr and Mrs are spelled with a final period (cf. Mr., Mrs.) following American spelling.
- While prepositions before days may be omitted in American English, e.g., She resigned Thursday, they are usually retained in Philippine English: She resigned on Thursday. However, those prepositions are usually omitted in journalistic writing.
- Ranges of dates use to, e.g., Monday to Friday, rather than Monday through Friday. This is shared with British English and is in contrast to American English.
- When speaking or writing out numbers, and is not inserted before the tens, i.e., five hundred sixty-nine rather than five hundred and sixty-nine. This is in contrast to British English. Additionally, the insertion of and is also common in American English.
- The preposition to in write to (e.g. I'll write to you [something]) is always retained, as opposed to American usage where it may be dropped.
- When referring to time, Filipinos refer to 12:30 as half past twelve or, alternatively, twelve thirty and do not use the British half twelve. Similarly, (a) quarter to twelve is used for 11:45 rather than (a) quarter of twelve, which is found in American English.
- To take a shower or take a bath are the most common usages in Philippine English, following American English, whereas British English uses have a shower and have a bath. However, bathe is as often as similar to American or British usage, but not widespread.
- Directional suffix -ward(s) generally found in British English is the primary usage in Philippine English, therefore towards, afterwards and upwards over the American toward, afterward and upward. However, forward is more prevalent than the chiefly British forwards. Philippine English speakers drop the -s when using phrasal verbs such as look forward to.
- When reading decimal numerals that are usually two or three digits, each numeral is read like a whole number rather than by each digit, e.g. (0).99 is (zero) point ninety-nine, instead of (zero) point nine nine or, especially in schools, ninety-nine hundredths in both British and American English. Additionally, four-digit decimals are also treated similar to how Americans read four-digit numbers with non-zero tens and ones as pairs of two-digit numbers without saying "hundred" and inserting "oh"; 3.1416 is thus "three point fourteen sixteen" and not "three point one four one six" as pronounced.

=== Education ===
- The word course in the Philippines generally means the entire program of study, which may extend over several years and be made up of any number of modules, hence it is also practically synonymous to a degree program. This usage is due to indirect influence from Spanish curso and its borrowed forms in Philippine languages. The usage is shared with British English.
- In the Philippines, a student studies or majors in a subject (although a student's major, concentration or, less commonly, emphasis is also used in Philippine colleges or universities to refer to the major subject of study). To major in something refers to the student's principal course of study; to study may refer to any class being taken.
- Grade levels in the Philippines are named grade one and grade two as opposed to first grade and second grade, similar to Canadian English.
- Graduating classes in the Philippines are called batches. Thus, a student in the same batch is called a batchmate.
- In the Philippines, a group of students in a regularly scheduled meeting in a classroom with a teacher in a certain school year or semester or school quarter year is called a section. The teacher in charge of a specific section in a grade level where the students for each class in a certain school year or semester does not typically change per class in a system where each subject is taught by different teachers is called a class adviser or simply, an adviser.
- A school where primary and secondary students study together is called an integrated school.

=== Religion ===
- The name of a Catholic cardinal is almost always in the pattern "[first name] Cardinal [last name]", for example, Juan Cardinal de la Cruz, similar to the syntax in German and Latin, unlike "Cardinal [first name] [last name]" in non-Philippine English.
- Catholic priests, both diocesan and those of a religious order, are titled "Reverend Father", abbreviated as "Rev. Fr." before their first and then last names, in contrast to practice in some other English-speaking nations. By contrast, "Reverend" or "Rev." before a personal name is only for deacons, for example, "Reverend Juan de la Cruz", unlike their counterparts in the United States. "The Rev." alone before priests' names is usually found in articles sourced from non-Philippine media, like the Associated Press (AP), in Philippine newspapers.
- A pastor goes by "Ptr." rather than the international "Ps."

=== Monetary units ===
- Philippine English speakers often say two hundred fifty or two fifty over the British and alternatively American two hundred and fifty. In British and sometimes American English, the "and" comes after the hundreds (one thousand, two hundred and thirty dollars). Philippine English does not observe this.
- Philippine English speakers often say one hundred fifty instead of the American a hundred (and) fifty.
- In Philippine English, particularly in television or radio advertisements, integers can be pronounced individually in the expression of amounts. For example, on sale for ₱399 might be expressed on sale for three nine nine, though the full three hundred and ninety-nine pesos is also common. Philippine English follows the American English on sale for three ninety-nine, which is understood as ₱399. In the past this may have been understood as ₱3.99, however due to inflation, ₱3.99 is no longer a common price for goods.

== Vocabulary ==
Philippine English's base vocabulary generally follows those of American English, but in some instances, preferred word usage follows those of British English such as with aircon for air conditioning or cinema for a movie theater. Sometimes both the American and British usages occur concurrently in Philippine English with varying degree of prevalence, such as with overpass/flyover or soccer/football.

Philippine English includes many terms describing the Philippine political, administrative and sociological landscape such as with balikbayan, barangay, carnapping, charter change, GOCC, nuisance candidate, OFW, red-tagging, salvage and SUC, as well as cultural terms such as baon (packed lunch or pocket money), carinderia, jeepney, pasalubong, sari-sari store and teleserye. It both has words unique to Philippine English (e.g. ballpen for a ballpoint pen, comfort room for a toilet, computer shop for an Internet café), and words that acquired unique or specialized usages in the Philippines (e.g. commute for any travel via public transportation or load for prepaid mobile phone credits). Philippine English has also developed its own slang vocabulary (e.g. jingle for urination, number two for a mistress).

Philippine languages such as Tagalog, Cebuano or Ilocano also contributed loanwords to Philippine English, usually of names of local animal and plant life (e.g. ylang-ylang), as well as food and drink (e.g. adobo) and abstract cultural concepts (e.g. bayanihan, kilig and KKB). Spanish also have an influence on vocabulary, with loanwords such as despedida for a farewell party, estafa for fraud, pension house for a type of guest house, rotunda for a roundabout and viand for a dish eaten together with rice. Another common example is the term "academic freeze", which became widely used in the country to refer to the total suspension of the school year during crises, alongside "face-to-face classes" to specify in-person learning.

== Spelling and style ==
Philippine spelling usually follows American spellings, following the reforms promulgated in Noah Webster's 1828 Dictionary.

- Words which in British English (except in Oxford spelling) end with ise, such as realise, recognise and organise are spelt with ize following American English: realize, recognize and organize (exercise, however, is universal in all varieties).
- Words which in British English are spelled with -ae-/-oe- such as oestrogen and mediaeval are spelled with e alone as in American English as estrogen and medieval. Exceptions are aesthetic, amoeba and archaeology which follow common usage in American English, but can be spelled with just an e.
- French-derived words which in British English end with our, such as colour, honour and labour, are spelled with or following American English: color, honor and labor. British -our spellings are also sometimes used in words such as harbour, often as proper names.
- French-derived words which in British English end with re, such as fibre, centre and metre are usually spelled with er as in American English as fiber, center and meter. The word theater (American spelling) is also often spelled theatre (British spelling), with no preference in spelling. The British spelling centre is also used, but it is rarely used and not accepted in many settings such as schools.
- Words which in British English end with yse, such as analyse, paralyse and catalyse are spelled with yze following American English as analyze, paralyze and catalyze.
- There is no preference for words spelled with -log in American English or -logue in British English in Philippine English. Some words are usually spelled with -log, like catalog and analog, while others are typically spelled with -logue, like monologue or dialogue.
- A double-consonant l (primarily used in British and Commonwealth English) is usually retained in Philippine English when adding suffixes to words ending in l where the consonant is unstressed, contrary to common American practice. Therefore, Philippine English favors cancelled and travelling over the American canceled and traveling. (Note: In some words such as cancelled, the -ll- spelling is also acceptable in American English.)
- Where British English uses a single-consonant l in the words skilful, wilful, enrol, distil, enthral, fulfil and instalment, Philippine English typically uses a double consonant following American English: skillful, willful, enroll, distill, enthrall, fulfill and installment.
- The Commonwealth English defence and offence are spelled defense and offense following American English.
- Philippine English uses practice and license for both nouns and verbs, following American English, rather than licence for the second noun and practise for the first verb as in Commonwealth English.
- In all other cases, Philippine English prefers the American English spelling where it differs from current British spelling, as in program (in all contexts) for British English programme, and guerrilla for British English guerilla. However, programme is often used in the sense of a leaflet listing information about a play, game or other activity.
- Eid al-Adha and Eid al-Fitr are mostly spelled without the hyphen and the first A is replaced with an apostrophe as Eid'l Adha and Eid'l Fitr respectively as opposed to the rest of the world.
- The abbreviations natl and govt are often written with an apostrophe before the last letter (as nat'l and gov't) in Philippine English.
- The elements aluminium and caesium are spelled as aluminum and cesium following American English.

=== Date and time notation ===
The MM/DD/YYYY and DD/MM/YYYY date formats are used in the Philippines for date notation and the 12-hour clock for time notation. (Note: Smartwatches sold in the country are typically programmed to display the 24-hour format by default. However, Filipinos generally continue to express time using the 12-hour format in everyday conversation.)

=== Keyboard layout ===
There are two major English language keyboard layouts, the United States layout and the United Kingdom layout. Keyboards and keyboard software for the Philippine market universally use the US keyboard layout. Common special characters such as Ñ (used in proper nouns and Spanish loanwords) or the Philippine peso sign (₱, used in prices), however, are not indicated on Philippine keyboards; these are usually entered through dead keys, keyboard shortcuts or character input aids.

== Phonology ==
Philippine English is a rhotic accent mainly due to the influence of Philippine languages, which are the first language of most of its speakers. Another influence is the rhotic characteristic of American English, which has been a standard in the archipelago since the language was introduced through American public education. This is contrary to the majority of Commonwealth English varieties spoken in neighboring countries such as Malaysia or Singapore. The only exceptions to this rule are the words Marlboro, which is frequently read as Malboro, and Faber-Castell, which is frequently read as Faber-Castle. Therefore, /r/ phonemes are pronounced in all positions. However, some children of Overseas Filipinos who are educated in Commonwealth countries (such as Australia, New Zealand, or the United Kingdom) may speak in a non-rhotic accent unless taught otherwise. Native and well-educated speakers (also called acrolectal speakers) may also feature flapping and vowel sounds resembling the California vowel shift due to the influence of Hollywood movies and call center culture mostly pegged towards the American market.

For non-native speakers, Philippine English phonological features are heavily dependent on the speaker's mother tongue, although foreign languages such as Spanish have also influenced the pronunciation of English words. This is why approximations are very common, along with hypercorrections and hyperforeignisms. The most distinguishable feature of Philippine English is a lack of fricative consonants, including /f/, /v/, /θ/, /ð/, /z/, and often /ʒ/. Another feature is a general absence of the schwa /ə/; it is instead pronounced by its respective equivalent full vowel, although the r-colored variant [ɚ] has become increasingly popular in recent years.

=== Consonants ===
The following consonant changes apply for many non-native speakers of the dialect:

- The rhotic consonant /r/ may vary between a trill [r], a flap [ɾ] and an approximant [ɹ]. The English approximant [ɹ] is pronounced by many speakers in the final letters of the word or before consonants, while the standard dialect prefers to pronounce the approximant in all positions of /r/.
- The labiodental fricatives /f/ and /v/ are approximated into the bilabial stop consonants [p] and [b], respectively.
- Th-stopping: The dental fricatives /θ/ and /ð/ become either the alveolar stop consonants [t] and [d] or the dental stop consonants [t̪] and [d̪], respectively. This can be also observed from speakers of Hiberno-English dialects and a number of American English speakers.
- Yod-coalescence: Like most Commonwealth English variants outside Canada and sometimes in Irish English, the /dj/, /tj/ and /sj/ clusters become [dʒ], [tʃ] and [ʃ] respectively. This makes the words dew, tune and pharmaceutical become pronounced as [ˈdʒuː], [ˈtʃuːn] and [pärmɐˈʃuːtikäl], respectively. Yod-coalescence also occurs in some other words where other English variants either resist it or do not call for it, e.g. Calcium and celsius are respectively [ˈkälʃʊm] and [ˈsɛlʃʊs]. Because of these, the use of yod-coalescence is another case of approximation for aspirated consonants which Philippine languages lack in general in words such as twelve and top and the influence of the phonology of the mother tongues of many speaks of it.
- Yod-retention is usually practiced selectively, similar to the historical Irish or British and Commonwealth English, and to a lesser extent, some speakers of English in Canada, in certain words such as new(s) but not student. For that reason, maneuver is mainly pronounced also with the yod, in a somewhat hyperforeign manner, whereas all other accents drop it intrinsically. The yod is also retained in figure(d/s), thus not rhyming with bigger. However, yod-dropping is often common due to the influence of modern General American. The yod is also dropped in many words with an unstressed U, e.g. (ir)regular and municipal(ity). It, as retained in many words, is sometimes coalesced. More at "Yod-coalescence" above.
- The fricative /ʒ/ may be devoiced into [ʃ] in words such as measure. Alternatively, it can be affricated into [dʒ] in words such as beige.
- The /z/ phoneme is devoiced into an [s]. This also includes intervocalic /s/ and the ⟨ss⟩ in examples such as dissolve, possess and their derivatives, brassiere, dessert, dissolution, Missouri(an), possession and scissors, which are usually pronounced as a [z] in most other accents of English. However, Aussie is usually pronounced with [s] as in the United States.
- Older speakers tend to add an i or e sound before the syllable-initial clusters sl-, sm-, sn-, sp- and st- due to Spanish influence, so the words star and lipstick sounds like (i/e)star and lip(i/e)stick respectively.
- Like most non-native speakers of English elsewhere, the "dark l" ([ɫ]) is merged into the usual "light" [l] equivalent.
- The compound ⟨ll⟩ is pronounced as a palatal lateral approximant [ʎ] in between vowels (e.g. gorilla), especially to those who were exposed to Spanish orthography. This is negligible among younger well-educated speakers.
- The letter "z" is sometimes pronounced (and sometimes spelled) as "zey" /zeɪ/ like in Jamaican English. However, in standard Philippine English, it is pronounced and spelled as the American "zee" [zi].
- In Philippine English, general h-dropping in content words (like house or happy) does not occur, as speakers strongly retain the initial /h/ sound under the influence of standard American English phonology. However, h-dropping does occur in unstressed function words (such as him, her, or have) during fast, connected speech, as well as in standard silent-h loanwords like hour and honest, which is a standard feature across most global English varieties. Additionally, apparent h-dropping or glottal stop replacements can occasionally be heard due to the native linguistic substrate, where certain indigenous Philippine languages or regional dialects drop or soften the /h/ sound in localized loanwords.

=== Vowels ===
Vowels in Philippine English are pronounced according to the letter representing each, so that ⟨a, e, i, o, u⟩ are generally pronounced as [a, ɛ, i, o, u], respectively. The schwa /ə/—although a phonological feature across numerous Philippine languages such as Karay-a, Maranao, Kapampangan, or the Abagatan (Southern) dialect of Ilocano—is absent as a separate phoneme.

- The following are the various approximations of the schwa:
  - Words that end in -le that succeeds a consonant (such as Google and castle) are generally pronounced with an [ɛl], except for words that end -ple, -fle or -ble (apple, waffle and humble), which are pronounced with an [ol].
  - The /ɪ/ in words such as knowledge or college, it is pronounced as a diphthong [eɪ̯], making it rhyme with age, cage, rage, page, and beige.
  - The rhotic vowels /ər/ and /ɜːr/ may be pronounced as an [ɛr] (commander), [ir] (circle) or an [or] (doctor), usually by non-native speakers outside urban areas or the elderly.
- The ⟨a⟩ pronunciations /æ, ʌ, ɑ/ are pronounced as central vowels [ä] and [ɐ]. In the standard dialect, the open front vowel [a] may be pronounced as an allophone of /æ/.
  - For the above reason, words subject to the trap–bath split, e.g. basket(ball), bath, example, laugh, master and sample can be pronounced with [a] but often not for e.g. answer(able), can't, chance and France. Also, the mary–marry–merry merger is partial; Harry and hairy are distinct but sometimes not carry and Kerry.
  - The first ⟨a⟩ in some words such as patronage, patriot(ic/ism), (ex/re)patriate(d/s) and (ex/re)patriation usually have the sound of either [æ], like in British/non-Canadian Commonwealth or Irish English, or sometimes [ä], rather than [eɪ] in the United States and Canada. Moreover, the ⟨a⟩ in the unstressed -ative suffix is reduced to either the schwa or [a], becoming [-ətɪv] as in Britain and Ireland, for words stressed on the second syllable such as administrative, investigative, qualitative, sometimes innovative, and usually legislative. Administrative is also erroneously stressed on the third syllable. This does not apply to negative, alternative or initiative. ⟨a⟩ as the unstressed a- prefix, called alpha privative, is also the schwa or [a] before stems that begin with consonants, e.g. apolitical, asymmetric or asymmetry, asymptomatic, atypical, etc.
- The /ɪ/ phoneme may be merged or replaced by the longer [i] for some speakers. The words peel and pill might sound the same.
- The /ɒ/ or /ʌ/ may be enunciated as an [o] (color or even tomorrow, sorry, sorrow, etc. like in Canada) or an [ɐ] (not).
- The u sound from the digraph qu may be dropped before e and i in some words such as tranquilize(r) and colloquial likely due to Spanish influence.
- The /ʌ/ in namely couple and double may also be enunciated as an [o] or, rarely, as an [a].
- The /ʌ/ in namely culture and ultimate is sometimes enunciated as an [ʊ], partly similar to accents in the United Kingdom (except Scotland) without the foot–strut split.

=== Emphasis ===
- Distinct non-native emphasis or stress is common. For example, the words ceremony and Arabic are emphasized on the second syllable (as [sɛREmoni] and [A RAbik] respectively) as another result of indirect Spanish influence. Additionally, words ending in -ary such as beneficiary, complementary, elementary, judiciary and supplementary are treated as paroxytones or stressed on the /a/, rather than as proparoxytones or the preceding syllable, a hyperforeignism from the Spanish-derived -aria/-arya and -ario/-aryo.

=== Pronunciation ===
Many Filipinos often have distinct non-native English pronunciation, and many fall under different lectal variations (i.e. basilectal, mesolectal, acrolectal). Some Philippine languages (e.g. Ibanag, Itawis, Surigaonon, Tausug) feature certain unique phonemes such as [dʒ], [f], [v], and [z], which are also present in English. However, Filipinos' first languages (such as Tagalog) have generally different phonological repertoires (if not more simplified compared to English), and this leads to mis- or distinct pronunciations particularly among basilectal and to some extent mesolectal speakers.

Word/phrase	Philippine English pronunciation	Notes
Advocacy	[adˈ(b/v)okɐsi]	
Alyssa	[ɐˈlɐjsa]	e.g. Alyssa Valdez
Ambush	[ˈambʊʃ] [ˈambʊs]	
Article	[ˈartɪkɛl] [ˈartɪkol]	
Astatine	[astɐtɪn]	
Awkward	[ˈɔk.ward]	
Awry	[ˈari]	
Ball	[bɔl]	
Banana	[ba'na.na]	
Busy	[bɪsɪ]	
Cicada	[sɪˈkɑː.da]	
Compilation	[ˌkɒm.paɪˈleɪ.ʃɒn]	
Corn	[kɔrn]	
Coupon	[ˈk(j)uː.pɒn]	
Cyril; Cyrille	[saɪril]	
Disco	[dɪsko]	
Dynamite	[daɪnɐmaɪt]	
Elephant	[el.e.(f/p)ant]	
Eunice	[jʊˈnis]	
Effect	[ɛ(f/p)ek]	
Family	[ˈ(f/p)ɐmili] [ˈ(f/p)amili]	
February	[(f/p)ebˈwari] [(f/p)ebˈrari]	
Filipino	[(f/p)iliˈpino]	
Find	[ˈ(f/p)ajnd] [ˈ(f/p)ɐjnd]	
Flour	[flɔr]	
Fun	[ˈ(f/p)ɐn] [ˈ(f/p)an]	
Grill; Grille	[grɪl]	
Greece; Grease	[grɪs]	
Guidon	[ɡiˈdon]	
Hamburger	[ˈhɐmburɡɛr] [ˈhɐmburdzʲɛr]	
Hawk	[hɔk]	
High-tech	[ˈhajtɛk] [ˈhajtɛts]	
Horse; Hoarse	[hɔrs]	
Hopia	[hɔp.ja]	
Hubcap	[ˈhabkab]	
Info	[ˈim.(f/p)o] [ˈin.(f/p)o]	
Invite	[imˈ(b/v)ajt] [ˈim.(b/v)ajt]	
Indigenous	[ɪnˈdaɪ.d͡ʒɛ.nʊs]	
Iran	[ɪˈrɑn]	
Iraq	[ɪˈrɑk]	
Janice	[dʒaˈnis]	
January	[dʒanˈwari]	
Jeepney	[dʒipnɪ]	
Japanese	[dʒɐpanɪs]	
Kill; Keel	[kɪl]	
Litchi; Lychee	[ˈlaɪ.tʃi]	
Loquacious	[lə(ʊ)ˈkweɪ.ʃus]	
Loan	[lon]	
Longitude	[ˈloŋŋiˌtud, -ˌtʃud]	
Lover	[ˈlɐbɛr]	
Ludwig	[ˈlud(b/v)ig] [ˈludwig]	in native English words, the letter ⟨w⟩ is never pronounced as voiced bilabial stop [b] (allophone of voiced labiodental fricative /v/) because English strictly separates the rounded lip sound /w/ from the tooth-on-lip sound /v/ (approximate into burst of air on lips [b]). The only exceptions occur in loanwords and proper nouns borrowed from languages like German or Polish, where ⟨w⟩ natively represents the /v/ sound (approximate into voiced bilabial stop [b] in Philippine English). For example, words like Wunderkind, Bratwurst, and the surname Wagner are often pronounced with a [b] sound (allophone of /v/) in Philippine English to preserve their original European pronunciation.
Margarine	[mɐrɡɐˈrin]	
Missile	[ˈmɪ.saɪl]	
Official	[oˈ(f/p)isʲɐl] [oˈ(f/p)iʃɐl]	
Ombudsman	[omˈbudsman]	
Olympic	[olɪmpɪk]	
Oliver	[olɪ(b/v)er]	
Predator	[pɾɛ'deɪ̯toɾ] ['pɾɛ.dɪ.toɾ]	
Prosperity	['prɒs.pe.ri.ti]	
Poop	[pʊp]	
Rachel; Rachelle	[ˈreiʃel] [ˈrejʃɛl]	
Real; Reel	[rɪl]	
Ranch	[rantʃ]	
Savory; Savoury	[sa.(b/v)ɔ.rɪ]	
Seattle	[ˈsʲatɛl] [ˈsʲatel] [ˈʃatɛl] [ˈʃatel]	
Shako	[sʲaˈko] [ʃaˈko]	
Shampoo	[sʲampʊ] [ʃampʊ]	
Singer	[ˈsiŋŋɛr]	The word "singer" in Philippine English is traditionally pronounced with a geminated (doubled) /ŋ/ sound as [ˈsiŋŋɛr], where the "ng" sound is lengthened and distinctly split across syllables (sing-nger), rather than the standard American or British English pronunciation [ˈsɪŋər] (sing-er).
Special	[(i/ɛ)ˈspeɪ̯ʃal] [ˈspeɪ̯ʃal]	
Stephen, Stephen-	[(i/ɛ)ˈstifɛn] [(i/ɛ)ˈstipɛn]	Also applies to Stephens and Stephenson
Stage	[steɪdʒ] [(i/ɛ)ˈsteɪdʒ]	
Sunflower	[ˈsɐmˌplawɛr]	This is a process called anticipatory assimilation. In many Philippine languages, when an "N" sound is followed immediately by a "P" or "B" sound, the mouth naturally prepares for the lips to close early. This changes the "N" into an "M" (e.g., pambansa instead of panbansa). In "sunflower," the /n/ meets the /f/ (which is often localized as /p/), shifting "sun-" into "sum-".
Sustain	['sus.teɪn]	
Truck	[trɐk]	
Twenty	[ˈtweɪ̯nti]	
Underwear	[andɛrwer]	
Varnish	[ˈ(b/v)arniʃ] [ˈ(b/v)arnis]	
Vehicle	[ˈ(b/v)ɛhikɛl] [ˈ(b/v)ɛhikol]	
Very	[ˈ(b/v)ɛri] [ˈ(b/v)ejri]	
Victor	[(b/v)ikˈtor]	
Vinyl	['(b/v)inil]	
Virus	[' (b/v)aɪrus] ['(b/v)ɐɪrus]	
Volkswagen	[ˈpolksbäɡɛn] [ˈ(b/v)okswɐɡɛn] [ˈfolksvɐɡɛn]	In English, ⟨w⟩ rarely sounds like /v/ (approximated into voiced bilabial stop [b]) and ⟨v⟩ rarely sounds like /f/ (approximated into voiceless bilabial stop [p]), sharply distinguishing it from languages like German. The few exceptions for ⟨w⟩ sounding like /v/ (approximated into voiced bilabial stop [b]) occur entirely in foreign loanwords like Bratwurst or names like Elie Wiesel. Conversely, ⟨v⟩ only shifts to an /f/ sound (approximated into voiceless bilabial stop [p]) during fast speech assimilation—such as "have to" sounding like "haf to"—or in direct German borrowings like Vorsprung.
War	[wɐr]	
Wafer	[wɛɪ(f/p)er]	
Whole	[hul]	
Wittenburg	[ˈwitɛnˌbɛrg] [ˈ(b/v)itɛnˌbɛrk]	in native English words, the letter ⟨w⟩ is never pronounced as voiced bilabial stop [b] (allophone of voiced labiodental fricative /v/) because English strictly separates the rounded lip sound /w/ from the tooth-on-lip sound /v/ (approximate into burst of air on lips [b]). The only exceptions occur in loanwords and proper nouns borrowed from languages like German or Polish, where ⟨w⟩ natively represents the /v/ sound (approximate into voiced bilabial stop [b] in Philippine English). For example, words like Wunderkind, Bratwurst, and the surname Wagner are often pronounced with a [b] sound (allophone of /v/) in Philippine English to preserve their original European pronunciation.
Wolfram	[ˈbolpram] [ˈvolfram] [ˈwul(f/p)ram]	in native English words, the letter ⟨w⟩ is never pronounced as voiced bilabial stop [b] (allophone of voiced labiodental fricative /v/) because English strictly separates the rounded lip sound /w/ from the tooth-on-lip sound /v/ (approximate into burst of air on lips [b]). The only exceptions occur in loanwords and proper nouns borrowed from languages like German or Polish, where ⟨w⟩ natively represents the /v/ sound (approximate into voiced bilabial stop in Philippine English). For example, words like Wunderkind, Bratwurst, and the surname Wagner are often pronounced with a [b] sound (allophone of /v/) in Philippine English to preserve their original European pronunciation.
Zone	[sɔn]	

== See also ==
- International English
- English as a second or foreign language
- Formal written English
- List of dialects of the English language
- List of English words of Philippine origin
- Regional accents of English speakers
- Special English
- Philippine literature in English
- List of loanwords in Tagalog
- Konyo, English-Tagalog code-switching based on English
- Taglish, Tagalog-English codeswitching based on Tagalog
- Hokaglish, Hokkien-Tagalog-English contact language in the Philippines
- Philippine Hokkien
- Philippine Spanish
- Languages of the Philippines

== Bibliography ==
- Bautista, Maria Lourdes S.; Bolton, Kingsley, eds. (2008). Philippine English: linguistic and literary perspectives. Hong Kong (China): Hong Kong university press. doi:10.5790/hongkong/9789622099470.001.0001. ISBN 9789622099470.
  - Dayag, Danilo. "English-language media in the Philippines". In Bautista & Bolton (2008), pp. 49–66.
  - Tayao, Maria Lourdes (2008b). "A lectal description of the phonological features of Philippine English". In Bautista & Bolton (2008), pp. 157–174.
