= Ube latte =

Filipino latte flavor prepared using ube

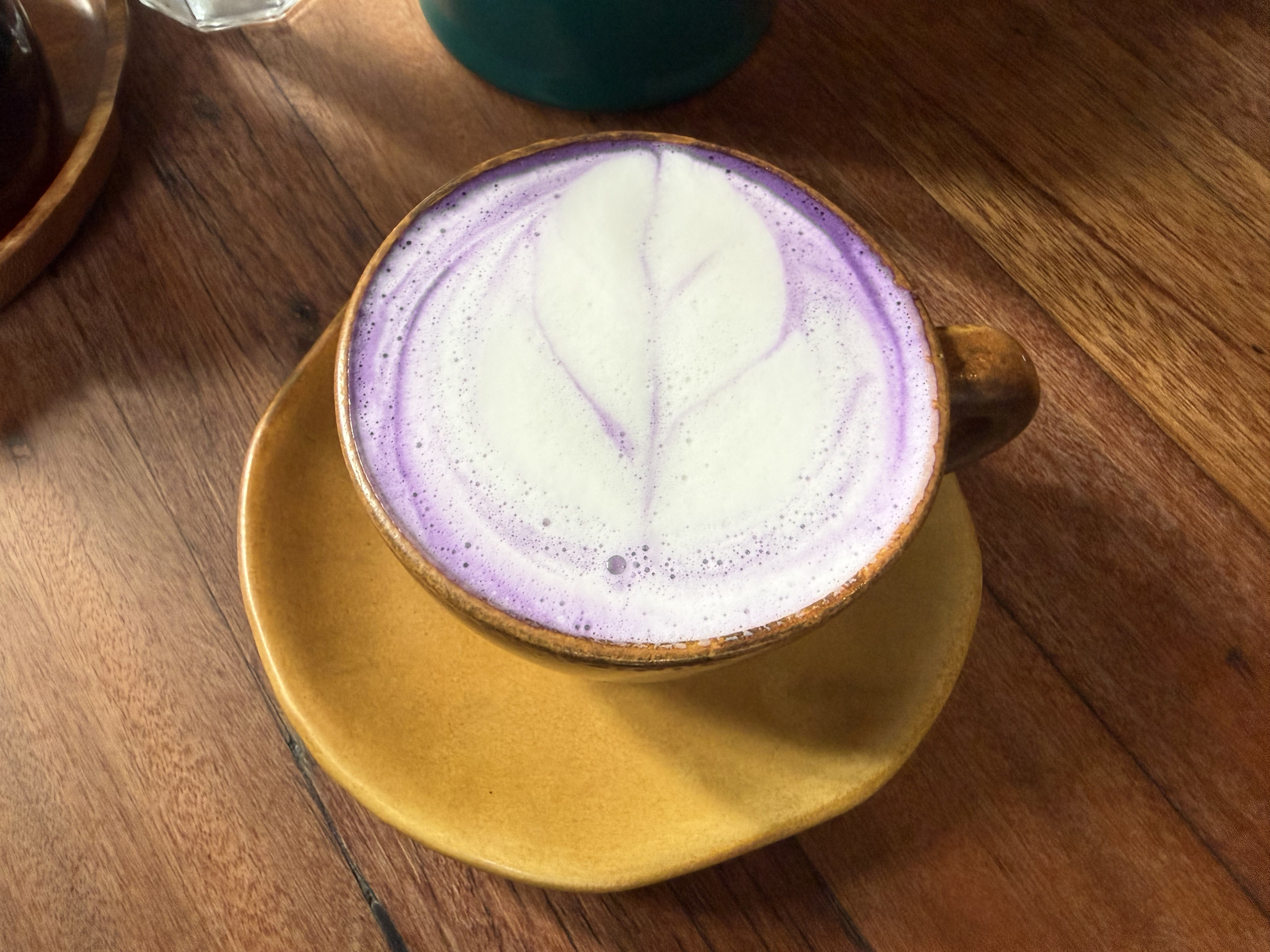
- Origin: Philippines
- Colour: Purple
- Ingredients: Ube, milk, espresso

Ube latte is a beverage made with ube, milk, and, in some variations, espresso.

Like other ube-based dishes, it is known for its distinctive purple color, which has contributed to its international popularity and social media prominence during the 2020s.

== Description ==
Ube latte is prepared using ground ube powder, water, and milk or a plant-based milk alternative. It may be served hot or cold.

Ube itself does not contain caffeine, but the beverage may be caffeinated with espresso, similar to caffè latte.

== History ==
Archaeological evidence indicates that ube, a tuber, has been consumed for about 11,000 years in the Philippines. Ube is a staple ingredient in Filipino cuisine and is used in dishes that combine indigenous and foreign culinary traditions, like halo-halo and ensaymada.

The Filipino diaspora in the United States is credited with introducing ube products to overseas consumers. According to CNBC, ube's naturally sweet flavor, exoticism, and color contributed to ube's increased popularity and virality on social media platforms like TikTok and Instagram in the mid-2020s.

As ube's popularity grew, multinational coffeehouse chains added ube lattes to their menus. Starbucks began serving ube lattes seasonally in 2025, followed by Peet's Coffee in 2026. The ube latte also began to spread outside the United States, with the drink being served in countries like Canada, Portugal, Spain, and the United Kingdom.

== Cultural impact ==
A 2025 report by food and beverage consumer intelligence company Tastewise found that, of the Filipino food and beverage categories it examined, interest among Generation Z consumers in the United States was highest in the coffee category.

Citing that report and interviews with Filipino-American café owners, Eater suggested that beverages may serve as a "low-stakes" introduction to Filipino cuisine for American consumers. The Financial Times similarly reported that Filipino restauranteurs in London viewed British coffee chains' adoption of ube beverages as an opportunity to increase awareness of Filipino cuisine among Britons.

== See also ==
- Ube cake
- Ube ice cream
