= Sili ice cream =

Filipino ice cream made with labuyo chilis

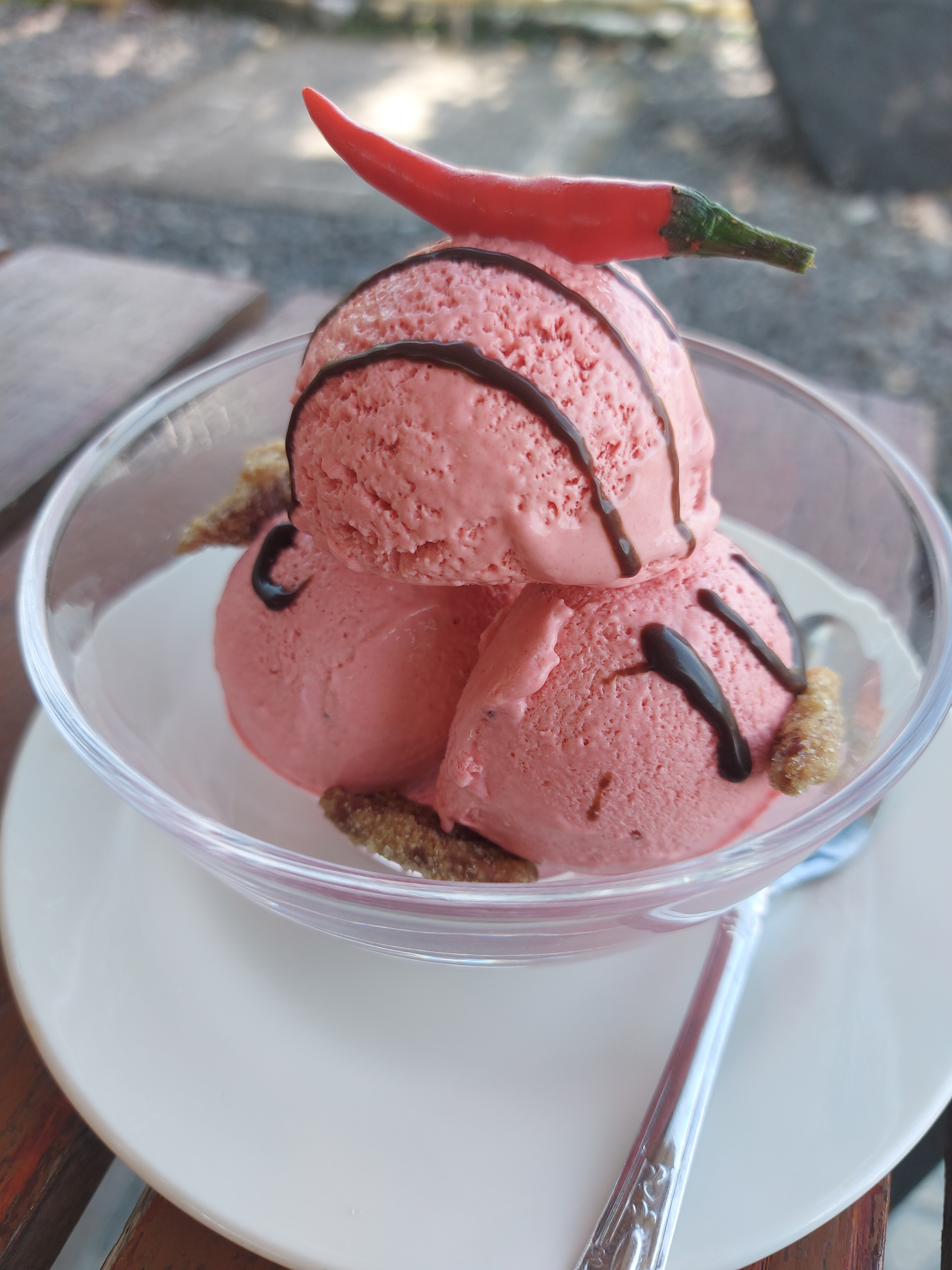
- Sili ice cream in the Philippines
- Alternative names: Labuyo ice cream, Chili ice cream
- Type: Ice cream
- Place of origin: Philippines
- Region or state: Bicol Region
- Created by: 1st Colonial Grill restaurant
- Serving temperature: Cold

Sili ice cream is a Filipino ice cream flavor that is prepared using siling labuyo and coconut milk. It was invented by the 1st Colonial, a homegrown restaurant in Albay founded in 2004. It has since become one of Bicol's best-known and most sought-after regional delicacies. It is associated with and inspired by the regional cuisine of Bicol, which characteristically serves spicy dishes using siling labuyo.

== See also ==
- Sorbetes
- Ube ice cream
- Queso ice cream
