= Ube ice cream =

Filipino ice cream made with purple yam

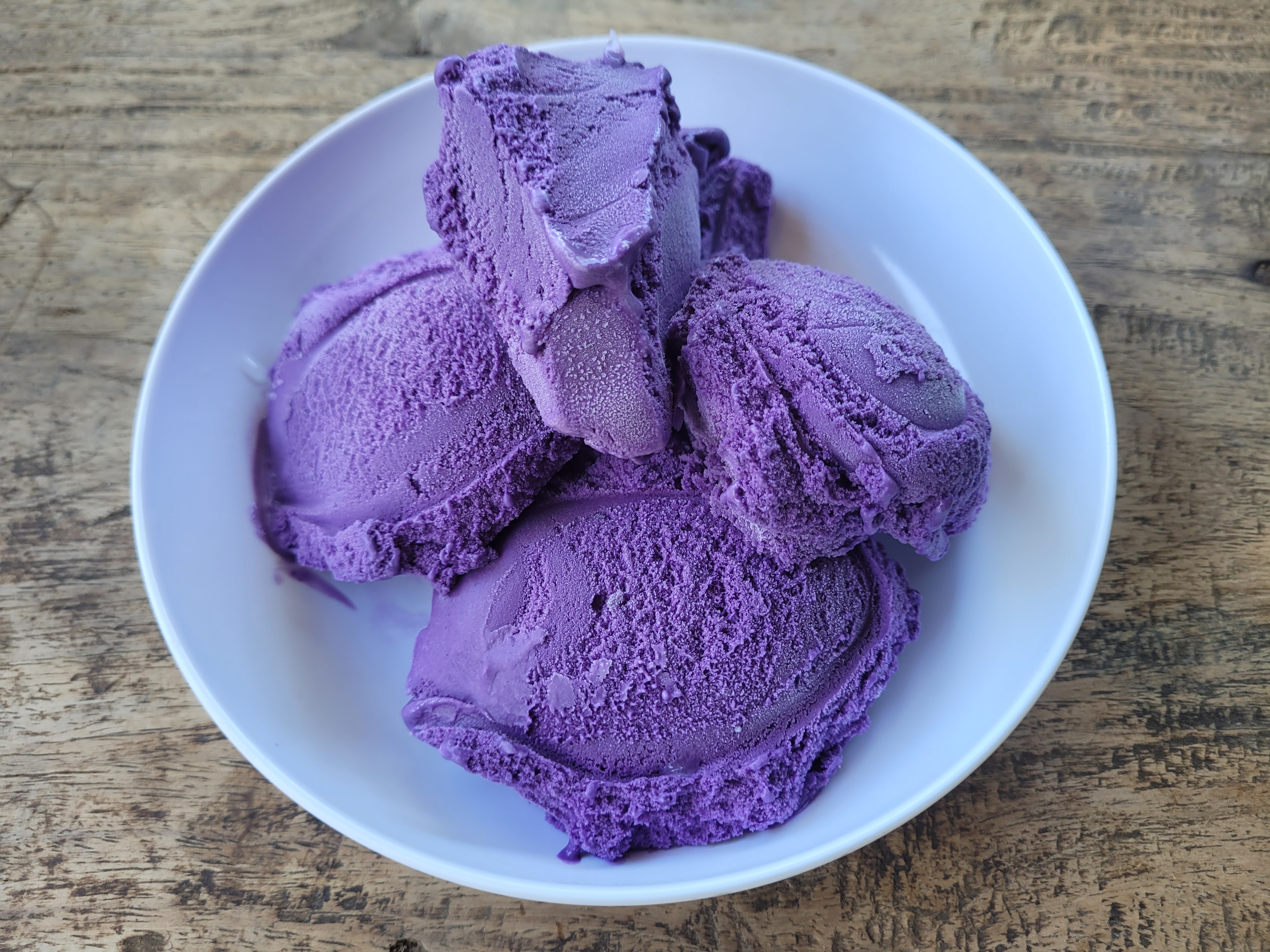
- Ube ice cream in the Philippines
- Alternative names: Purple yam ice cream
- Type: Ice cream
- Place of origin: The Philippines
- Serving temperature: Cold

Ube ice cream is a Filipino ice cream flavor prepared using ube (purple yam, not to be confused with taro/purple sweet potato) as the main ingredient. The ice cream is often used in the making of the dessert halo-halo.

== History ==
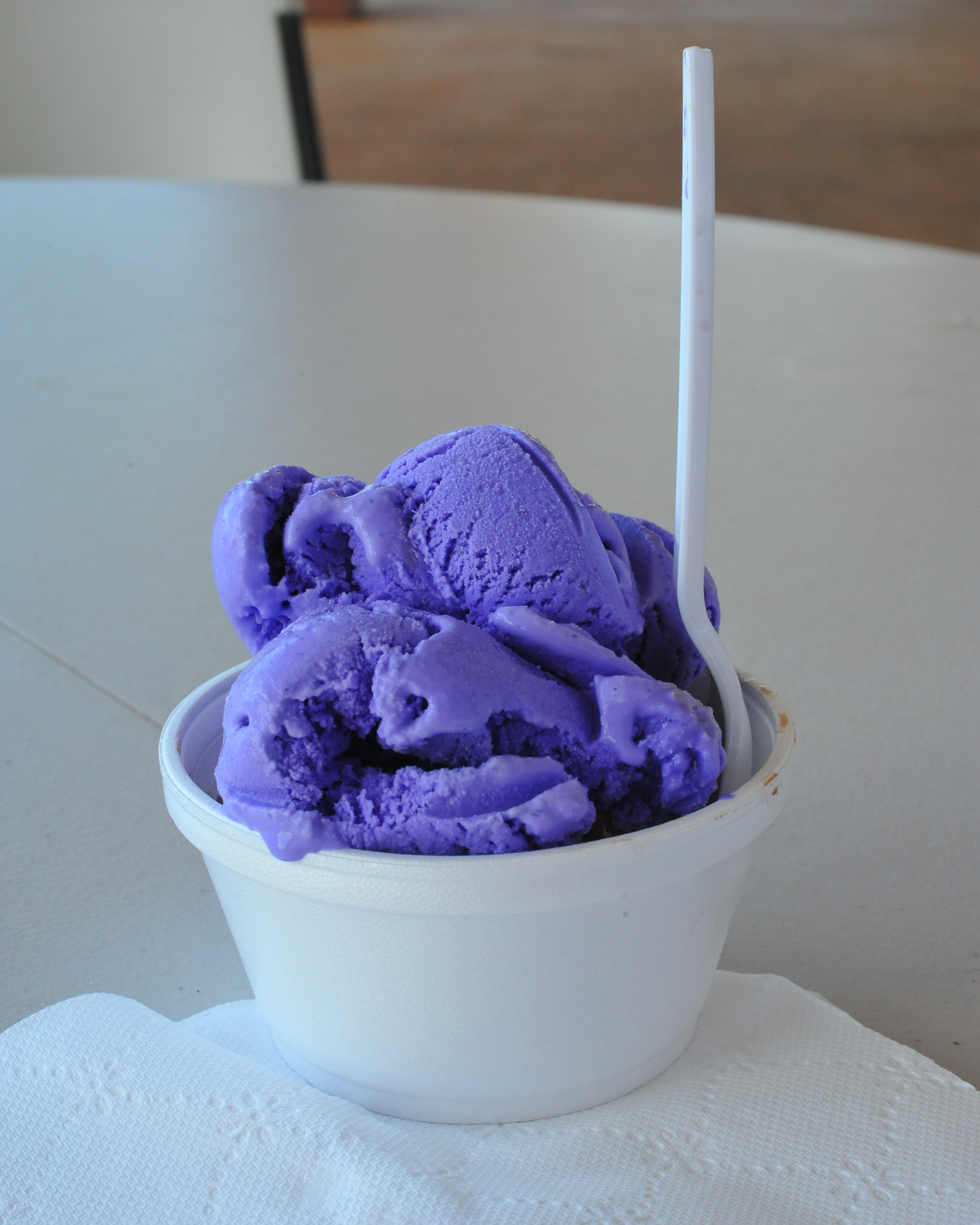
Ube–macapuno ice cream, served in Hawaii

Due to its vivid and vibrant violet color, ube has been a staple of Filipino desserts, most notably ube halaya, which has a moderately sweet and nutty taste. As plain boiled ube is nearly flavorless similar to kamote (sweet potato), taro (known as gabi locally) and other root crops, the "ube flavor" is really the flavor of ube halaya, which is ube cooked with coconut milk or cow's milk and sugar. The earliest recorded use of ube in ice cream was in a recipe from 1922, when ice cream's introduction to Filipino culture during the American occupation (as the local adaptation sorbetes) led to new flavors like mango, pinipig, and melon. The recipe called for mashed ube, milk, sugar, and crushed ice. During that time, ice cream was also hand-churned in a garapinyera, a manually operated ice cream mixer.

Ube ice cream has risen in popularity outside the Philippines, due to its use by Filipino immigrants in restaurants (often with halo-halo) and Trader Joe's line of ube products, its vivid violet color and the spread of its pictures on social media.

== Use in halo-halo ==
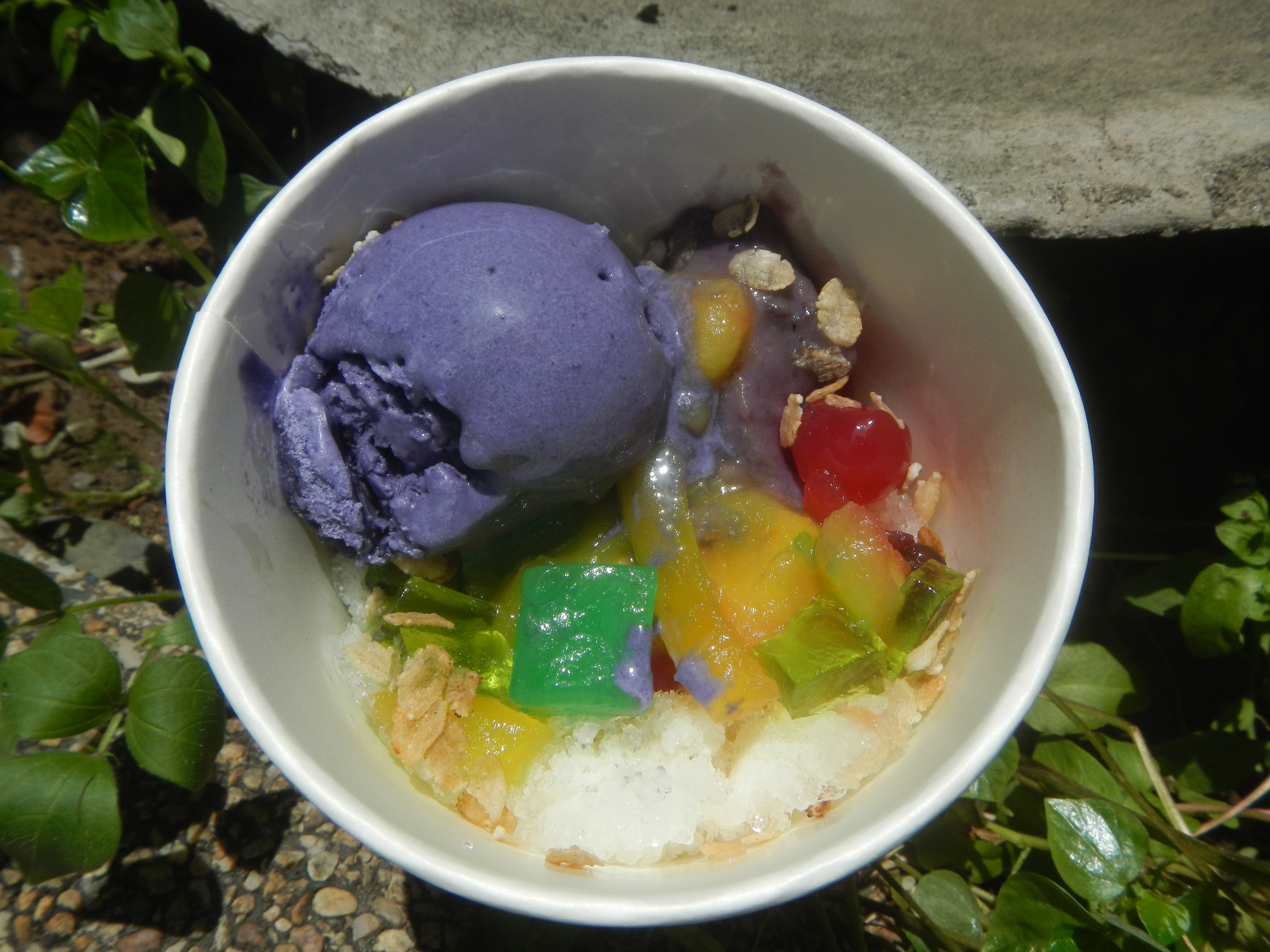
Ube ice cream in halo-halo, alongside ube halaya (darker purple).

Ube ice cream is a common but not essential ingredient in halo-halo, a popular Filipino dessert consisting of a mix of various ingredients, such as coconut, sago, sweetened beans, slices of fruit such as jackfruit or mango, leche flan and nata de coco, and ube itself in halaya form. Ube is seen as an essential ingredient of halo-halo due to lending the dessert its distinctive flavor and violet color. Thus, ube ice cream may be used in place of or together with ube halaya. Since evaporated milk is another essential ingredient of halo-halo, using ube ice cream as well makes for a creamier recipe. On the other hand, many halo-halo recipes avoid using ube ice cream (and fruit-flavored ice cream in general) for this very reason, as the creaminess and sweetness of the ice cream may overpower or throw off the balance of the halo-halo's other ingredients, and so these versions use ube halaya instead.

== See also ==
- Queso ice cream
- Sili ice cream
- Ube cake
- Ube crinkles
- Ube latte
