= Balikbayan =

Balikbayan may refer to:

- Overseas Filipinos
- Balikbayan box, a corrugated box containing items sent by overseas Filipinos
