= Queso ice cream =

Filipino ice cream made with cheese

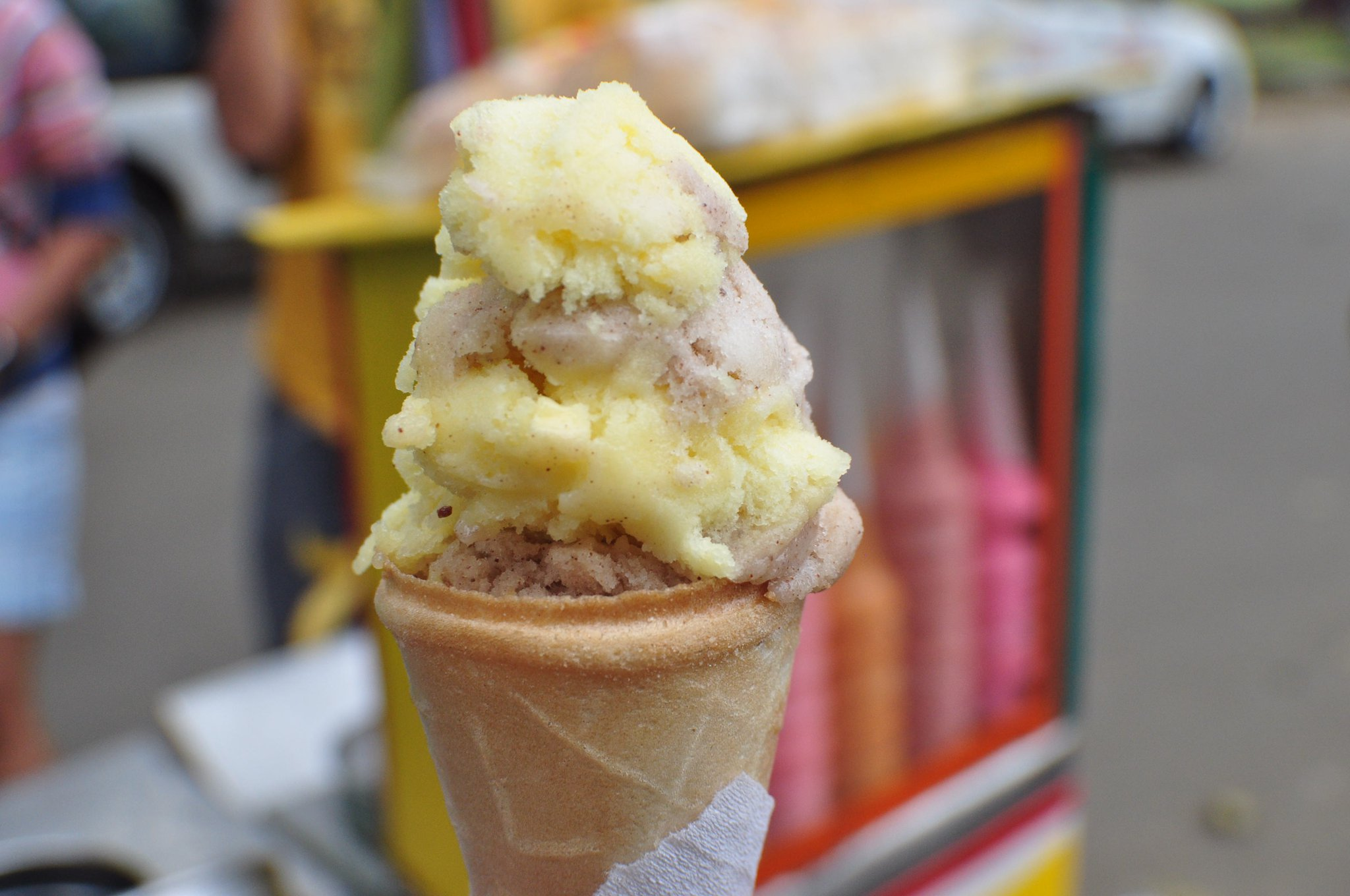
- A queso and chocolate sorbetes
- Alternative names: Keso ice cream, cheese ice cream, cheddar cheese ice cream
- Type: Ice cream
- Place of origin: Philippines
- Serving temperature: Cold
- Variations: Mais con queso ice cream

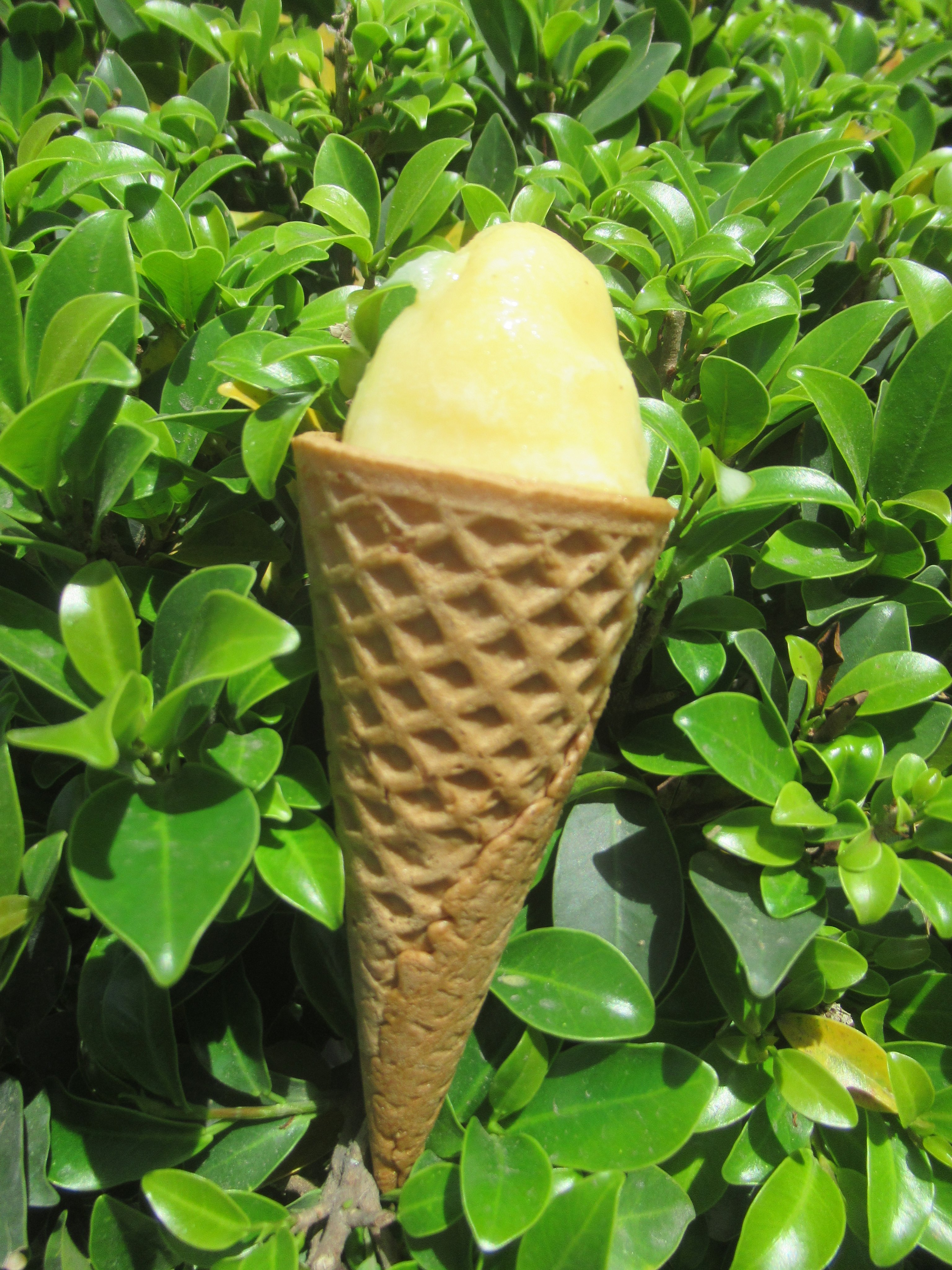
'Popular' queso ice cream

Queso ice cream, also called keso ice cream or cheese ice cream, is a Filipino ice cream flavor prepared using cheddar cheese and sweet cream. The classic dessert has a salty, sweet, and tangy flavor. It is considered one of the traditional or "Pinoy" flavors of Filipino sorbetes, alongside ube, buko, and mantecado.

It is also commonly eaten as an ice cream sandwich with pandesal bread rolls, or made with corn kernels (a popular dessert pairing in the Philippines called mais con queso).

== History ==
The American colonial period brought a heavy influence to Filipino food culture. During this time, American canned goods and other American products were imported to the Philippines. These products and American ideologies were heavily advertised around the country. After the Spanish colonial period, Americans believed that they were helping the Filipino people by teaching them American culture. When it comes to food and cooking habits, Americans would tell Filipinos in school that American food was much more sanitary and nutritious than Filipino food.

=== Ice cream ===
Ice cream was first introduced to the Philippines in 1899 during the American occupation. During this time, an American businessman, Metcalfe Clarke, opened the first ice cream parlor at Manila's Plaza Moraga.

Refrigerators did not enter the average Filipino home until the 1920s, so locals had to go to parlors to purchase ice cream. Having ice cream at home and being able to serve it to guests became a symbol of status. At the time, only the elite could afford a refrigerator in their home; refrigerator brands pushed elitist ideology in their branding to encourage wealthy consumers to purchase their products.

As ice cream became popularized and more homes adopted refrigerators, the cheaper alternative to the sweet frozen dessert was born: Sorbetes or "dirty ice cream". Made with carabao or coconut milk and cassava flour, sorbetes offers an affordable alternative to ice cream. Sorbetero carts sold traditional Filipino ice cream flavors such as keso, ube, and buko.

=== Cheese ===
The introduction of cheese in the Philippines also ties back to colonial times. Queso de Bola, or Edam cheese, is a popular and culturally significant cheese in the Philippines. It is literally a "ball of cheese" wrapped in red wax, traditionally served during Noche Buena (Christmas Eve) and New Year's. Queso de Bola has Dutch roots and was a tradition brought through Spanish colonization. Cheddar cheese wasn't introduced to the Philippines until WWII.

It is common for Queso de Bola to be used as a substitute for cheddar cheese in some sweet Filipino dishes (and vise versa) as they taste similar. There are modern recipes of queso ice cream that use Queso de Bola instead of cheddar cheese.

== Variations ==
It is common for people to eat queso ice cream as an ice cream sandwich with pandesal bread rolls. Many ice cream brands will sell queso ice cream combined with a variety of other flavors, like corn kernels (mais con queso).

American ice cream companies have began selling and experimenting with cheese in a variety of ways. In 2021, Van Leeuwen partnered with Kraft to make a Kraft Macaroni and Cheese flavored ice cream. Salt & Straw currently sells flavors such as: Pear and Bleu Cheese and The Salty Donut Guava and Cheese.

Mexico has their own version of queso ice cream, typically called helado de queso, made with requesón cheese.

== Popular filipino desserts featuring cheese ==
- Ensaymada
- Puto
- Cheese mamon
- Bibingka
- Puto bumbong

== See also ==
- Ube ice cream
- Sili ice cream
