= Sorbetes =

Filipino ice cream

Sorbetes (Philippino Mango Ice Cream)
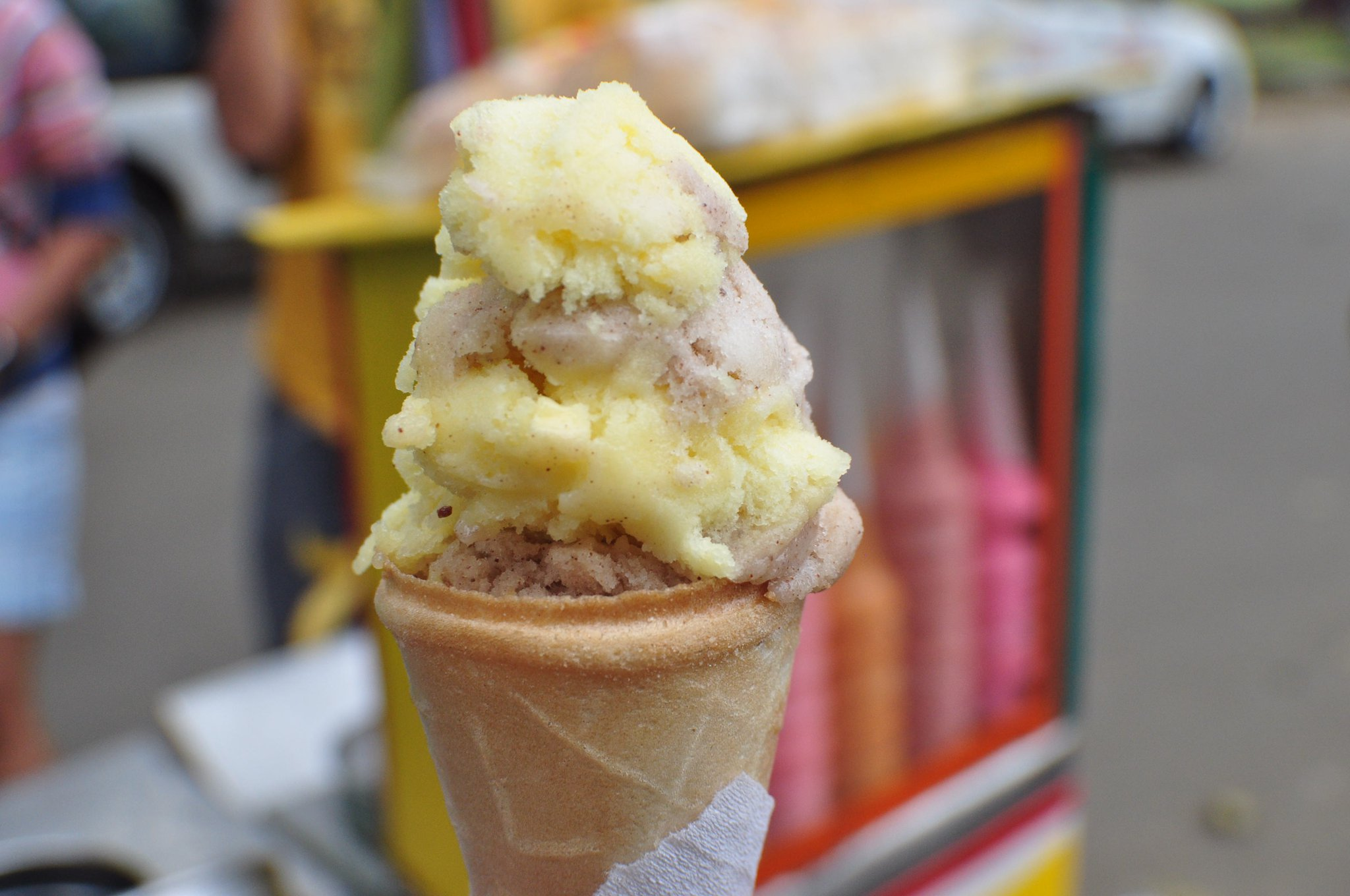
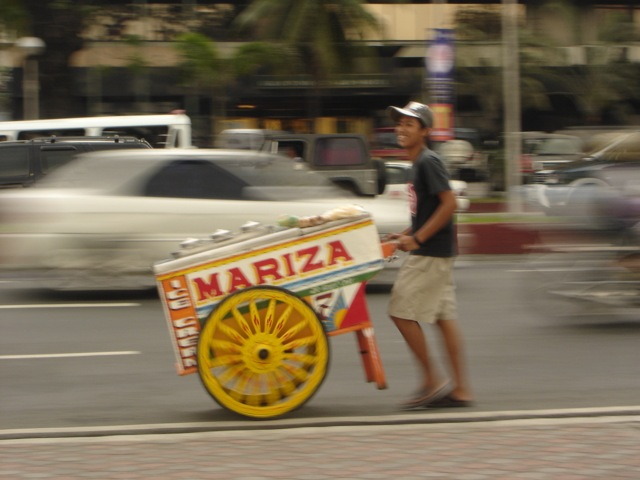
- Top: Cheese (queso) and chocolate sorbetes Bottom: Traditional sorbetero pushcart
- Type: Ice cream
- Place of origin: Philippines
- Serving temperature: Cold

Sorbetes, also referred to as dirty ice cream, in the Philippines refers to a traditional ice cream originating in the country, uniquely characterized by the use of coconut milk and/or carabao milk. It is served on a wafer cone or sandwiched in a bread bun. It is distinct from the similarly named sorbet and sherbet. The term is borrowed from Spanish as the plural form of sorbete which refers to sorbet. It is often pejoratively called "dirty ice cream" in contrast to brand-product ice cream, such as those made by Magnolia or Nestlé. It is traditionally peddled in colorful wooden pushcarts by street vendors called "sorbeteros". It is served in various flavors (usually dyed in bright colors) in small wafer or sugar cones and more recently, as a pandesal bread ice cream sandwich.

== History and formulation ==
Ice was first introduced as a luxury item to the Philippines in 1847, when an American company, Russell & Sturgis, imported 250 tons of organic ice into the then Spanish colony. They acquired the tax-free rights to import ice into the Philippines by Royal Order in 1848. The company built the first ice plant in the Philippines in Calla Barraca, Binondo. The company went bankrupt in 1881 and was acquired by the businessman Julio Witte. Ice cream was already known to Filipinos in the Spanish colonial period. Ice cream was served as a dessert at the banquet at the inauguration of Emilio Aguinaldo in 1898.

The first large-scale ice plant, the Insular Ice Plant was built during the American colonial period in 1902. It was one of the first permanent structures built by the US government in the islands, and the first ice manufacturing plant in Southeast Asia.

The first sorbetes was made during this period using a garapiñera. It consisted of a metal cylinder filled with the ice cream ingredients, enclosed by a wooden bucket filled with ice. It had a cranking mechanism that churned the contents of the cylinder until it acquired the texture and consistency of sorbetes. This typically took hours, and salt was added to the ingredients to speed up the freezing. These were sold on the streets by peddlers known as sorbeteros. They were originally on foot with a carrying pole (similar to taho vendors). Sorbeteros eventually started selling their products on a distinctive cart, which were gaudily decorated like jeepneys. Sorbeteros also carry a distinctive bell, that they intermittently rang. Each cart typically has three flavors, each dyed a vibrant color.

Originally, sorbetes used cow's milk like American ice cream. Manufacturers eventually switched to the more readily available coconut milk, carabao milk, and even cassava flour, to make the ice cream more affordable. These ingredients give the ice cream a distinctly different flavor and consistency to the western ice creams it was based on. Original flavors were varied, but include distinctly Filipino ones like mantecado (butter), ube (purple yam), queso helado (iced cheese), pinipig (toasted pounded rice), melon, mango, jackfruit, avocado, and buko (young coconut). Flavors continued to evolve and now include a wide variety of artisanal native flavors, including unusual ones like champorado, green mango with shrimp paste (bagoong), bibingka, and so on.

Over time, sorbetes manufacturers also started competing with commercially available ice creams by adopting their flavors, like chocolate, cookies and cream, and mocha. Commercial ice cream giants like Arce Dairy, Esmerald, Darchelle, Magnolia, Nestlé, and Selecta, likewise, started copying local flavors and also started selling their products in sorbetero carts.

Sorbetes acquired the name "dirty ice cream" as a joke, due to the fact that it is sold on the streets.

== Sorbetero ==
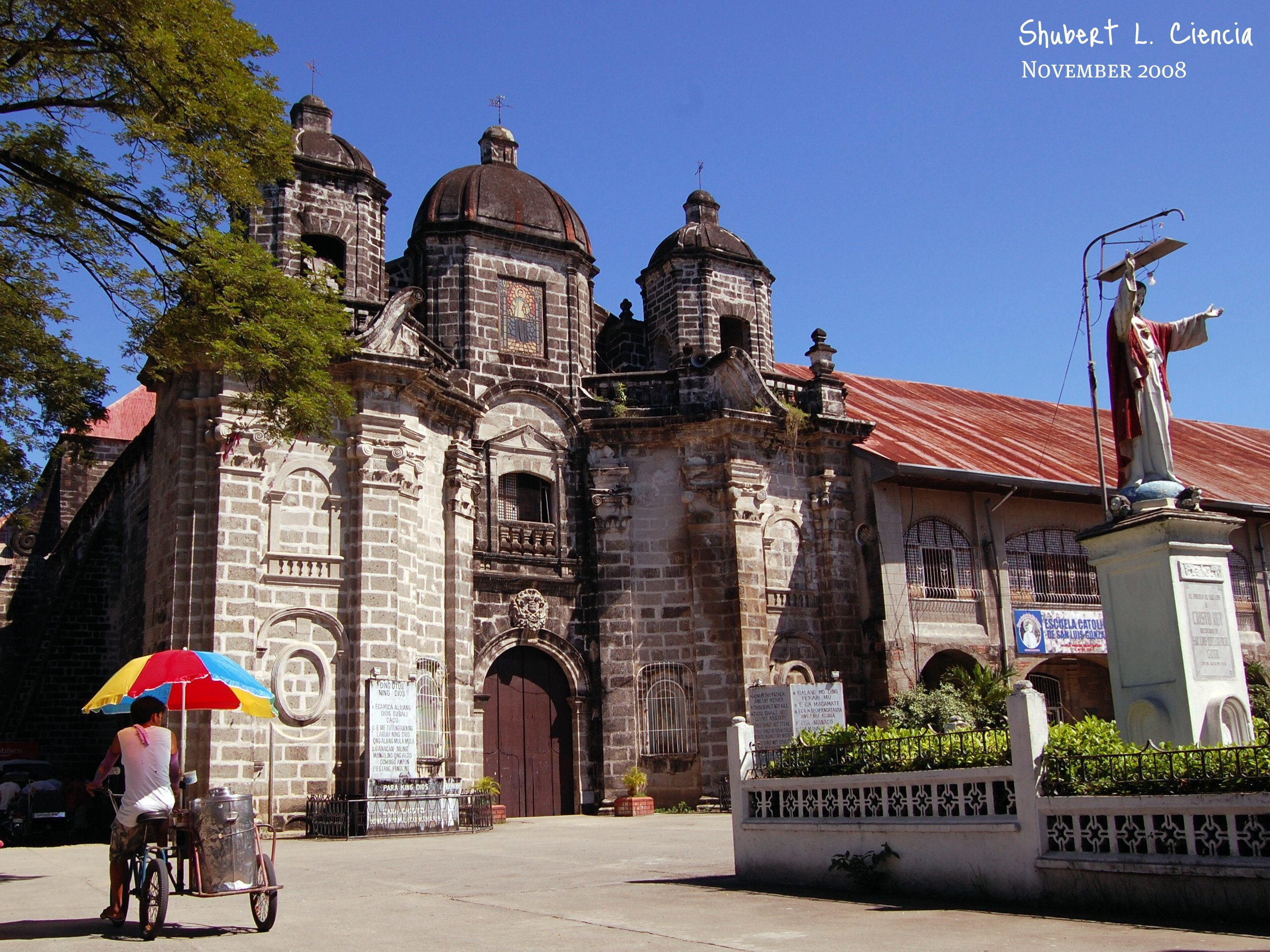
Modern tricycle-mounted sorbetero in front of the San Luis Gonzaga Parish Church, Pampanga.

Sorbetes are peddled by sorbeteros (ice cream vendors) using colorfully painted wooden carts which usually can accommodate three flavors, each in a large metal canister. Peddlers get their carts from makers scattered around the cities of the Philippines in the morning and walk the streets the whole day, calling consumers from their houses by ringing a small handheld bell.

The wooden cart has two large wooden wheels at the front part to easily push the cart though latest carts are already attached to bicycles. The cart is stuffed with shaved ice sprinkled with salt to produce a lower temperature around the metal canisters and keep the sorbetes frozen longer. The whole sorbetes cart is also available for private gatherings when negotiated with the sorbetero. It is usually cheaper than buying gallons of brand-name ice cream to be served to guests. Sorbeteros provide several serving options. It may be served in a wafer cone, a sugar cone or a bread bun, at varying prices. A serving can include one flavor or, for no extra charge, a mixture of available flavors.

The Sorbetero has also been depicted in film and in song such as the 1979 film Mamang Sorbetero, and the song "Mamang Sorbetero", performed by Celeste Legaspi.

In the comic strip Pugad Baboy, a sorbetero complains about the term "dirty ice cream" being unfair, but the characters point out that the term is well-entrenched and their suggested alternatives like "alternative ice cream" or "independent ice cream" just confuse customers.

== Gallery ==
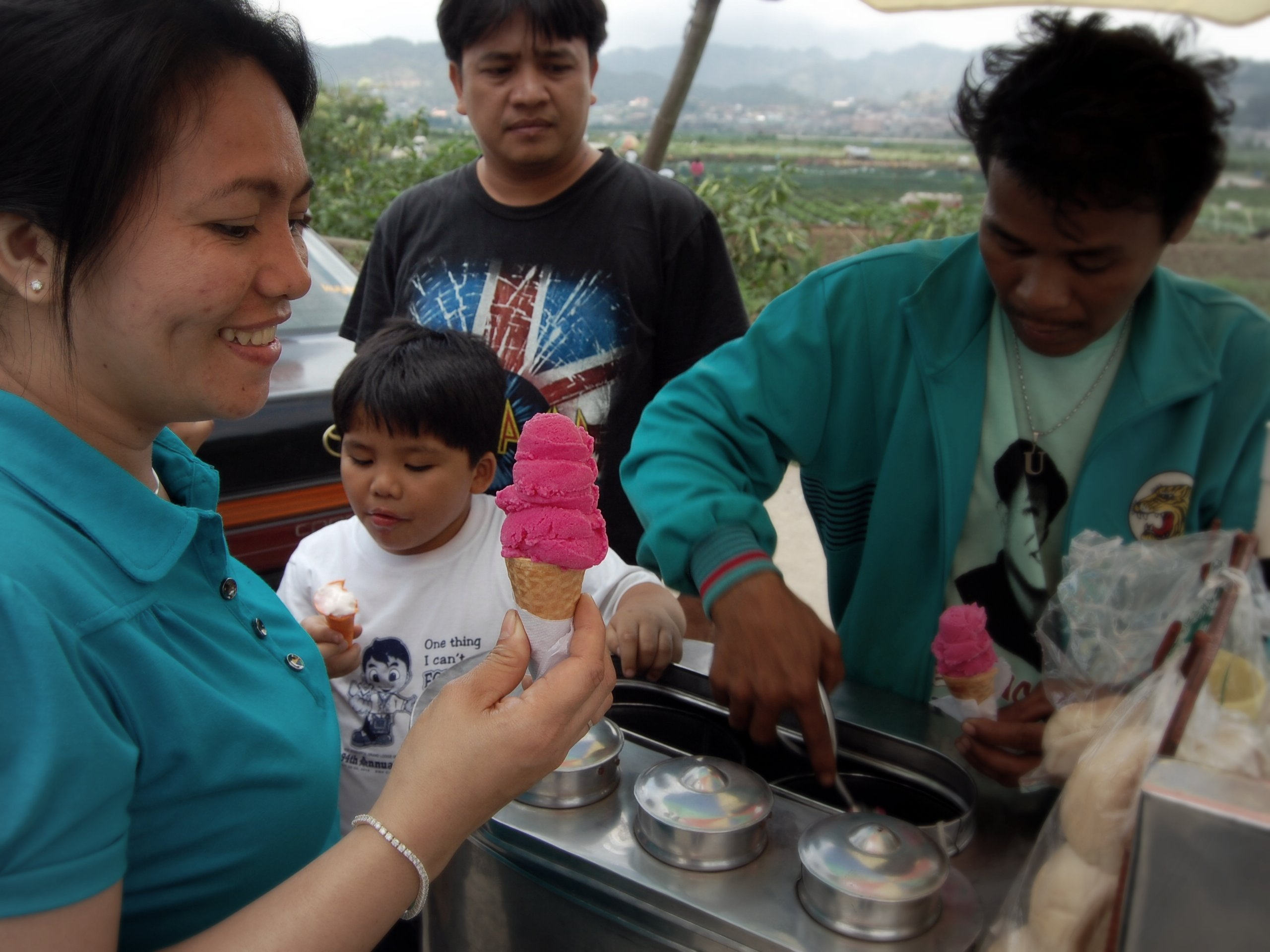
A woman purchasing strawberry sorbetes from a street vendor in La Trinidad, Benguet

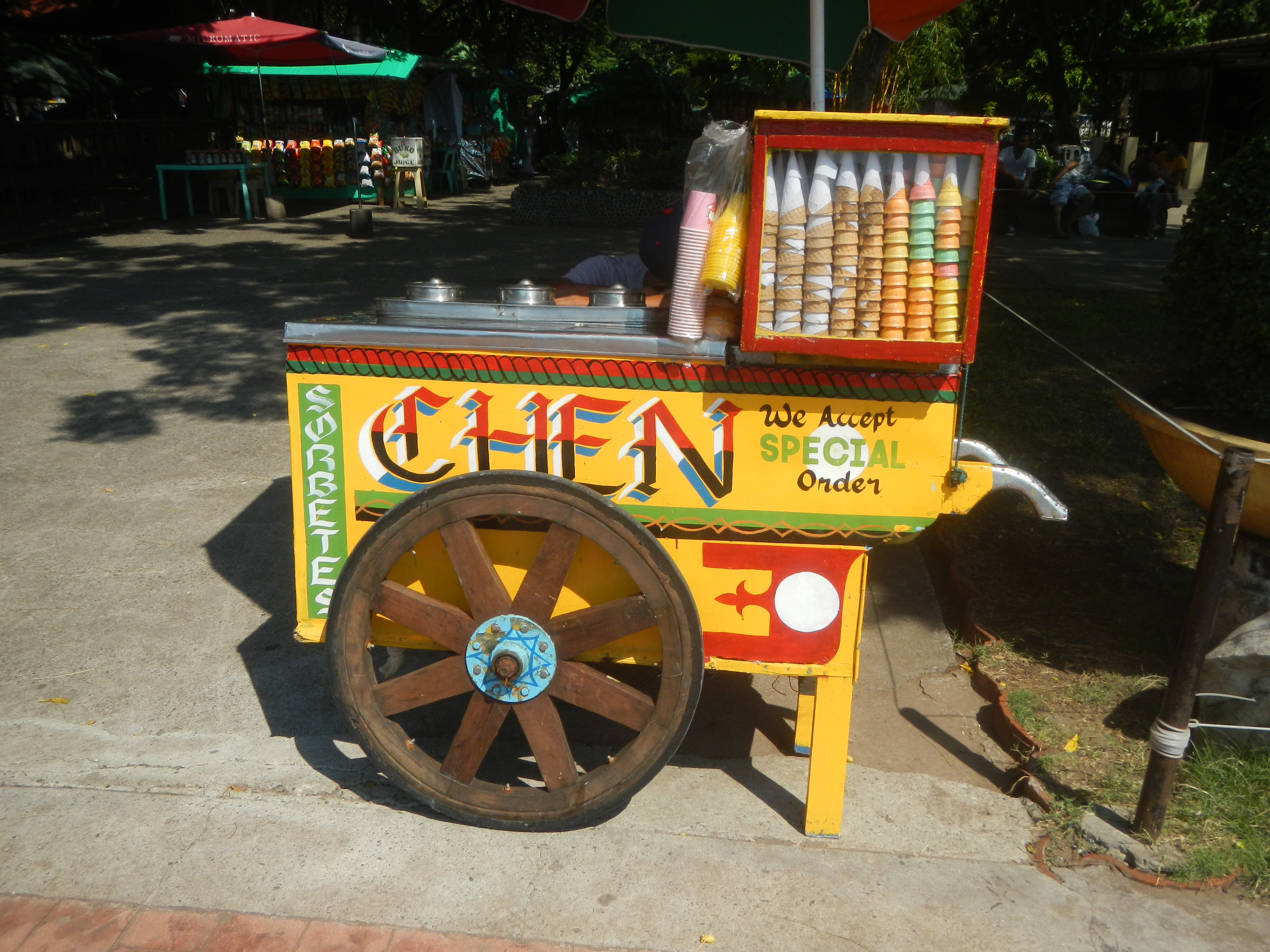
Traditional colorful wooden sorbetes pushcart in Rizal Park, Manila

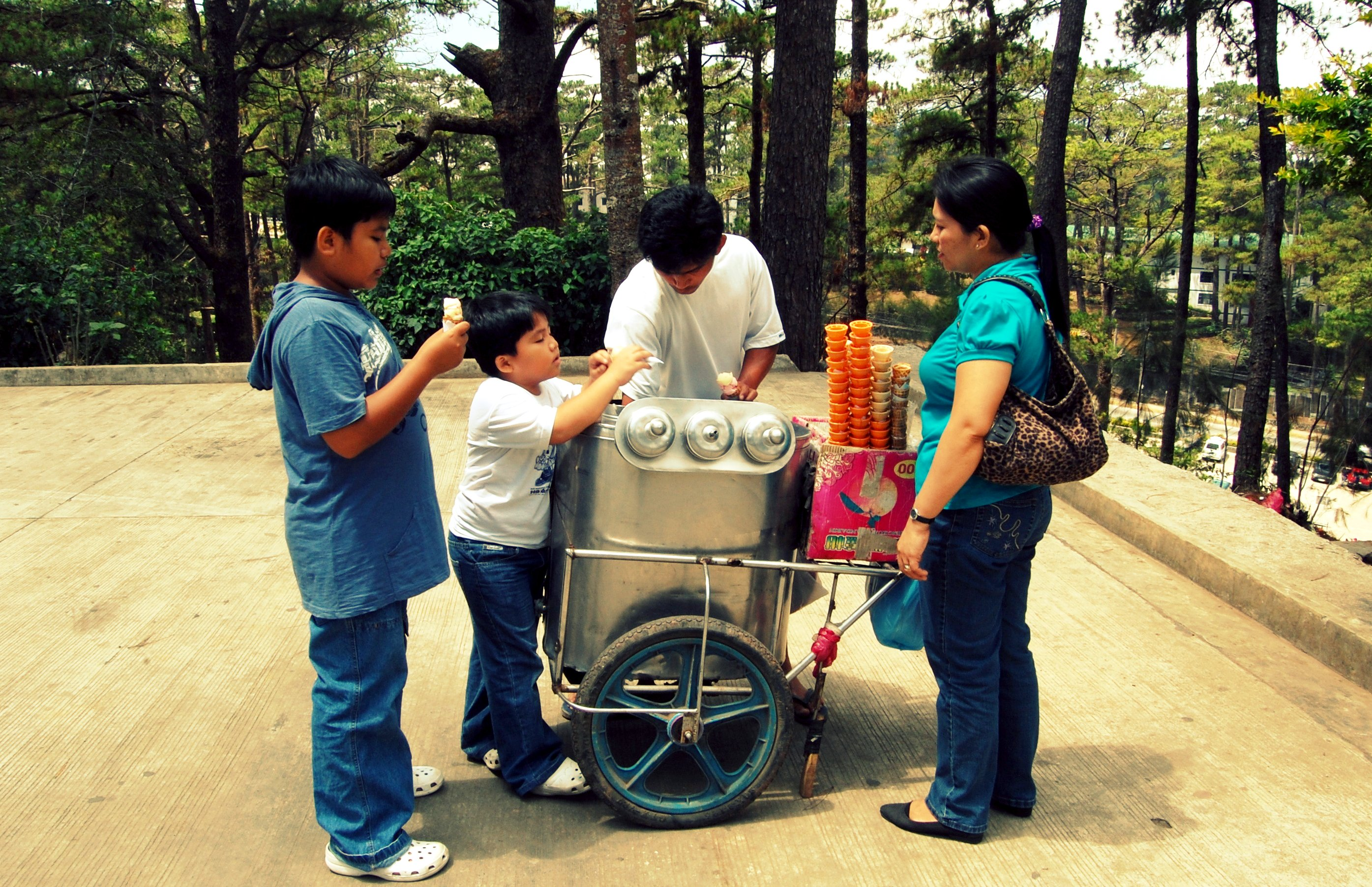
Children buying sorbetes in Baguio

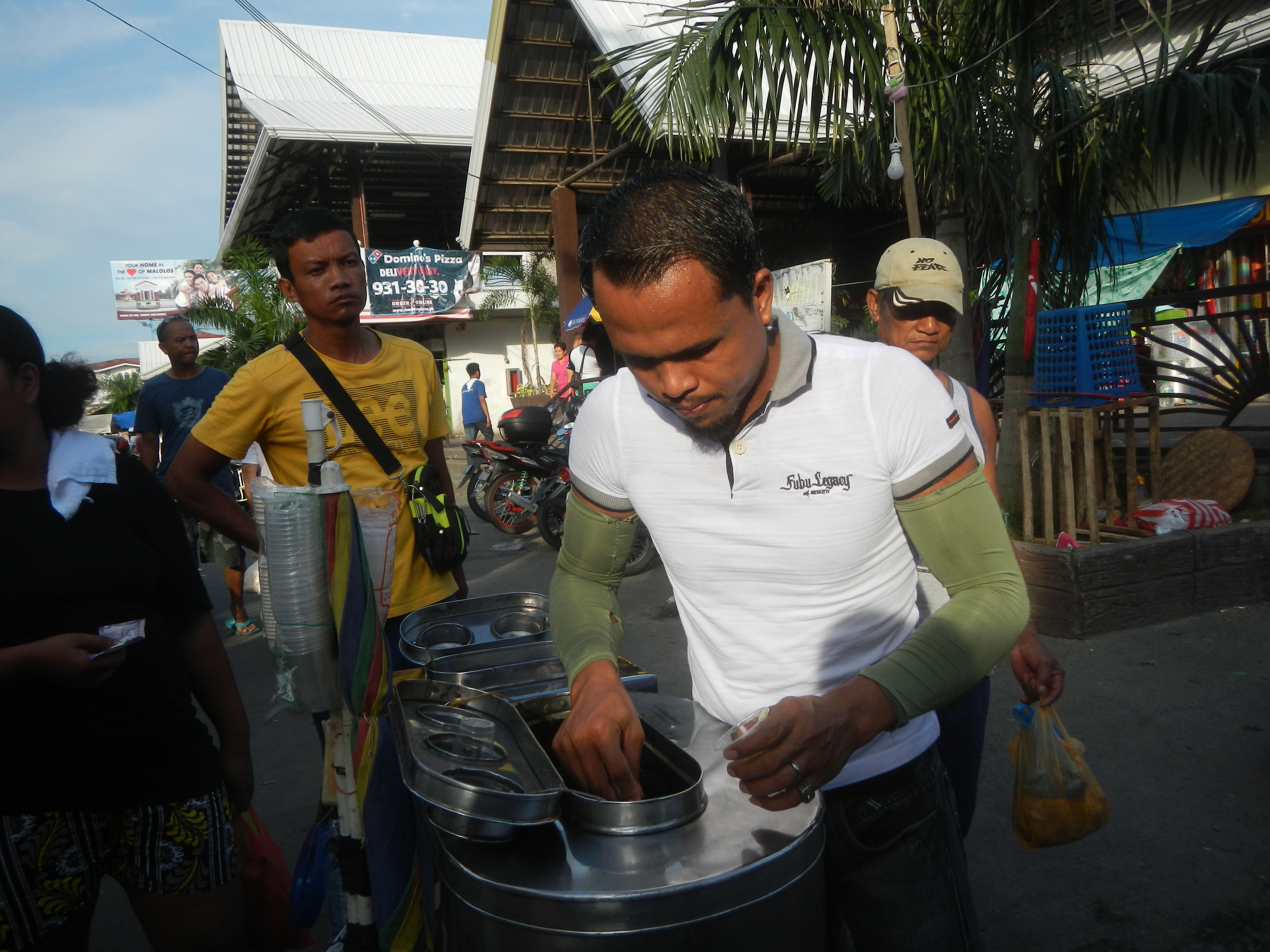
Sorbetero serving sorbetes in the Malolos Historic Town Center, Bulacan

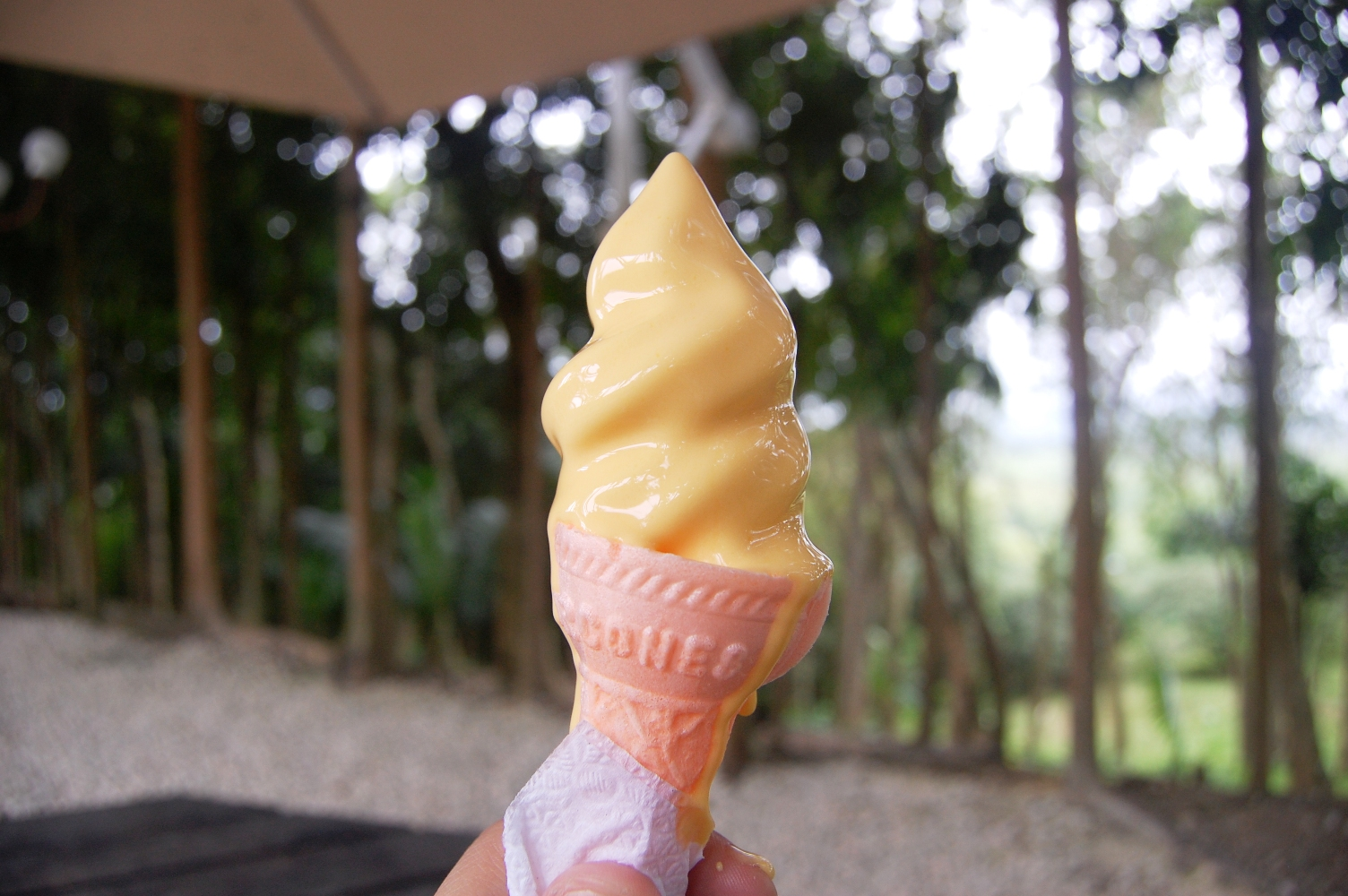
Mango sorbetes from Barili, Cebu

== See also ==
- Sili ice cream
- Ube ice cream
- Queso ice cream
- Halo-halo
- Ice buko
- Ice scramble
- List of Philippine desserts
- Saba con hielo
