= Balikbayan box =

Box containing items sent home by overseas Filipinos

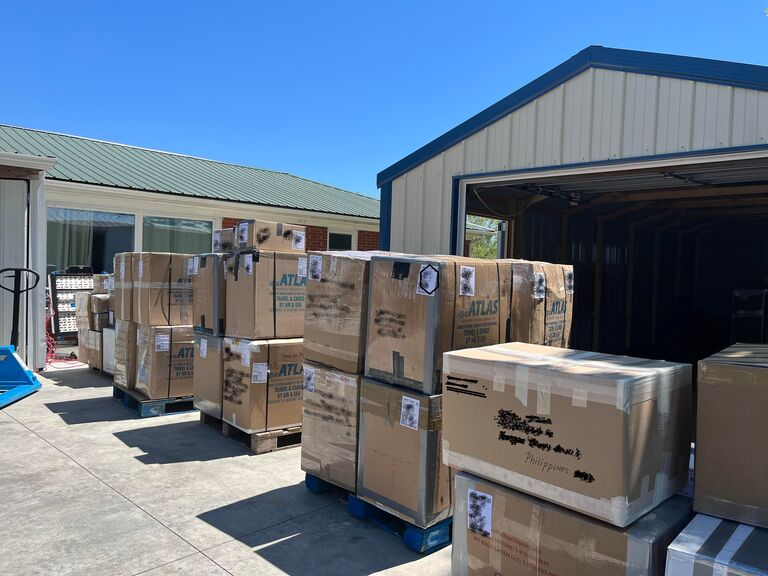
Kentucky Balikbayan Box Container Loading and Shipping Site

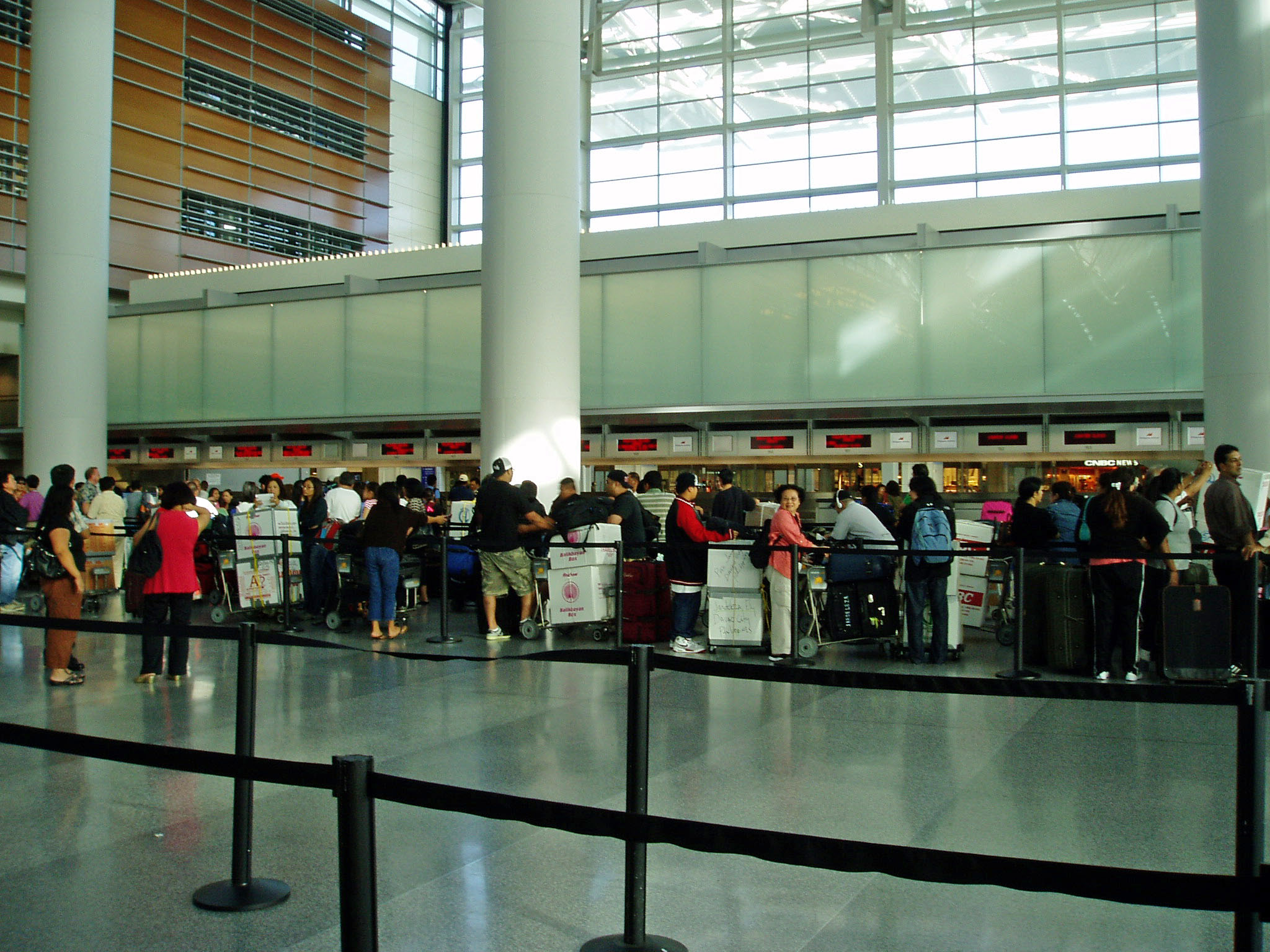
Travellers queuing with balikbayan boxes at San Francisco International Airport

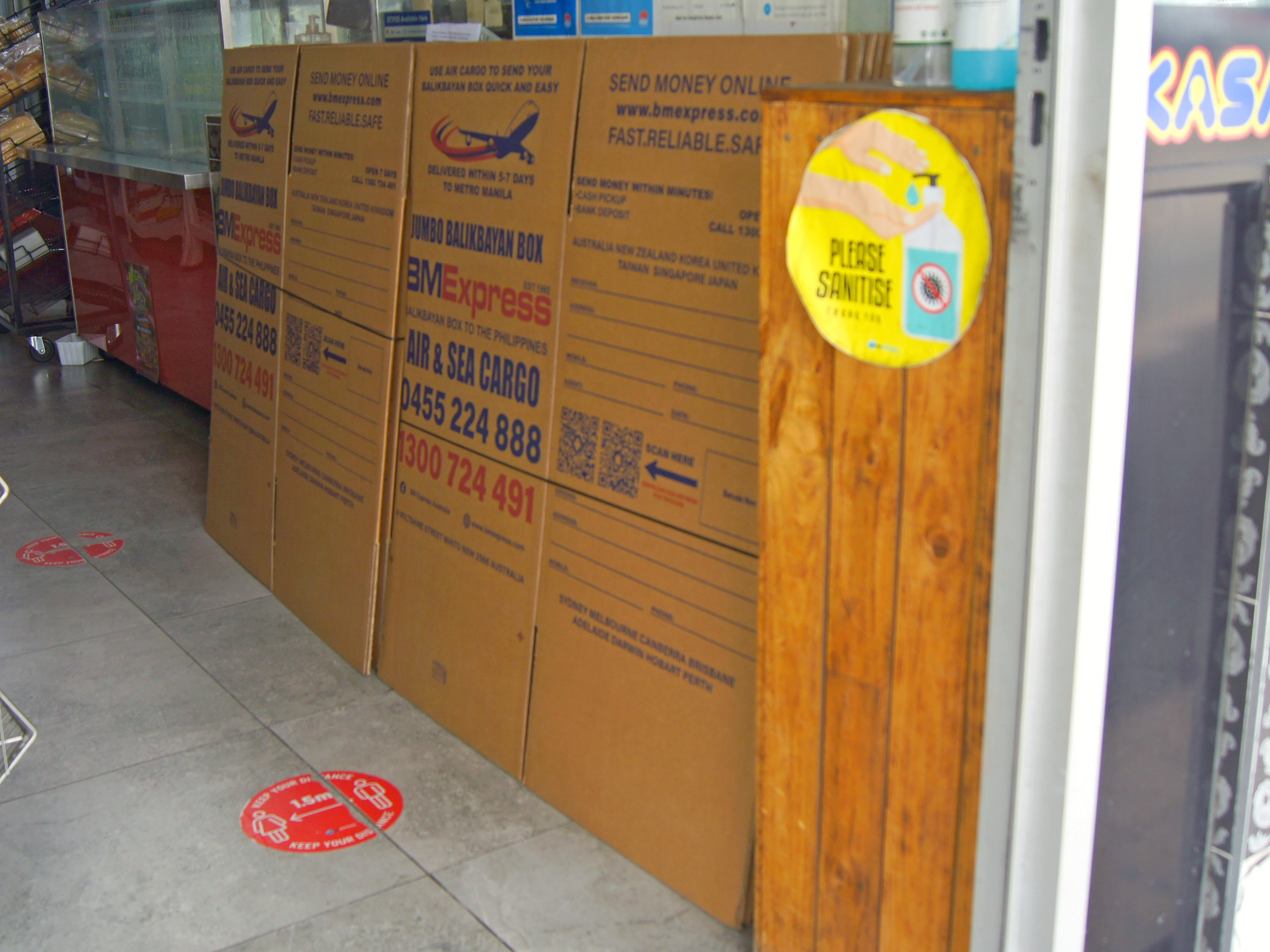
Balikbayan boxes for sale in a Filipino-owned business in suburban Sydney, Australia

A balikbayan box (lit. 'repatriate box') is a corrugated box containing items sent by overseas Filipinos (known as balikbayan literally "returnee to the country/nation"). Though often shipped by freight forwarders specializing in sending balikbayan boxes by sea or air freight, such boxes are also commonly brought by Filipinos returning to the Philippines via air.

== History ==
In 1973, the government of then-President Ferdinand Marcos, Sr began encouraging Filipino Americans to visit their ancestral hometowns in the Philippines. Individuals who did so became known as balikbayan, from the Tagalog words balík, "to return", and bayan, "town/settlement". Under the program, customs procedures were eased for such travellers and it was expanded by subsequent administrations.

Returnees often had gifts for friends and family as a modern extension of the pasalubong tradition, where presents are handed to those at home upon arrival from a journey or some absence. This expresses appreciation for and improves relations with people in a place of origin for those who are seen as having achieved financial success abroad. For those returning with valid balikbayan status, customs fees were waived for the contents of two boxes per individual. Eventually, it became common to package gifts, often household goods and practical items, in a box while still abroad. These boxes would then be shipped to the Philippines.

The balikbayan box became popular in the 1980s United States due to the country’s high influx of overseas Filipino workers. The first freight forwarder to offer balikbayan box services was Rico Nunga, who started REN International in Los Angeles, California, in 1981. The following year, Ramón Ungco, a Filipino in New York City, founded Port Jersey Shipping International. These two companies are considered the pioneers of door-to-door balikbayan box delivery, which back then were charged import duties upon arrival in the Philippines.

On June 30, 1987, then-President Corazon Aquino enacted Executive Order No. 206. This amended Section 105 (f), and added a new subsection (f-1) to Republic Act No. 1937, the Tariff and Customs Code of the Philippines, which was signed into law on July 22, 1957, by former President Carlos P. García.

The amended Section 105 of the Tariff and Customs Code provides duty-free and tax-free privileges to balikbayan boxes sent to the Philippines by overseas Filipino workers (OFWs), as recognition for their labors in foreign lands and bringing additional foreign revenue annually, which contributed to the ongoing national recovery effort. This allowed tax-free entry of personal goods into the country from overseas Filipinos, who then began sending the boxes through homeward-bound family, friends, and colleagues.

After the September 11 attacks and the passage of the Patriot Act by the United States Congress, balikbayan boxes have been subjected to rigorous inspections by the United States Department of Homeland Security's Out-Bound Exam Team that caused delays of up to three weeks at US Customs inspection facilities. This extended shipping times from 21 days to over 30 days. The inspections also resulted in opened balikbayan boxes and complaints of package pilferage and mishandling. The Philippine Bureau of Customs also conducted complete inspections that added to the delay in shipments. Such inspections are the result of criminals using the boxes to smuggle commercial items without paying taxes, or ship contraband. Since balikbayan box shipping is a consolidated shipment, one illegal item will affect all approximately 400 packages in the container. The inspection process has since been modernized with the use of high-performance X-ray machines.

In 2012, these delays were further aggravated when the city of Manila imposed a truck ban on routes to the Port of Manila, causing backlogs in releasing and transporting all domestic and international cargo. Most balikbayan box companies, which are based in Parañaque near the airport, were significantly affected by the truck ban until it was resolved.

The industry was scrutinized by the Philippine Senate in 2015, after complaints were brought to the attention of the public via social media after then-Philippine Customs Commissioner Albert Lina, announced the opening of balikbayan boxes for inspection and additional taxes to be imposed. The inquiry brought the passage of the Customs Modernization Act, which had been pending for years, and the inclusion of the Balikbayan Box Law in the act, increasing the tax-exemption ceiling from ₱500 to ₱150,000. This included items being brought home by Filipino tourists from trips abroad, pasalubong or gifts, and returning resident shipments.

To protect consumers, the Department of Trade and Industry (DTI), through its Philippine Shipper's Bureau, conducts regular accreditation of international freight forwarders and discourages consumers from patronizing unaccredited and incredibly cheap shipping companies.

According to the Door to Door Consolidated Association of the Philippines 400,000 balikbayan boxes arrive in the Philippines monthly.

== Description ==
Balikbayan boxes may contain items the sender thinks the recipient would like, regardless of whether those items can be bought cheaply in the Philippines, such as non-perishable food, toiletries, household items, electronics, toys, designer clothing, or items difficult to find in the Philippines. A balikbayan box intended for air travel is designed to conform to airline luggage restrictions and many Filipino stores sell them. Some boxes come with a cloth cover and side handles. Others are tightly secured with tape or rope, and thus not confused with an ordinary moving box that is lightly wrapped.

Balikbayan boxes typically are as close to a cube as possible - so as to maximize the volume versus the sum of the length(L), width(W) and height(H). Many airlines restrict the L+W+H to 158cm or 62in, so for checked in boxes, a typical box may be 52cm x 52cm x 52cm or 20.5in x 20.5in x 20.5in.

Shipped boxes are delivered directly to the recipient, usually the family of the overseas Filipino.

== Cultural significance ==
Part of the attraction of the balikbayan box is its economic value, as it allows cheaper shipment of items versus shipping in smaller boxes via postal services. The tradeoff is longer transit time by container ship, typically requiring several weeks, and the lack of a definite delivery date. The balikbayan box is a modern manifestation of the Philippine custom of pasalubong, where domestic or foreign travelers are expected to bring gifts for family, friends and colleagues. Balikbayan boxes provide connection between family in the Philippines and those abroad, and provide goods for the family in the Philippines. It also has been a contributing factor of the Philippines having good trade relations with foreign nations.

== See also ==
- Padala
