= Nilupak =

Class of traditional Filipino delicacies

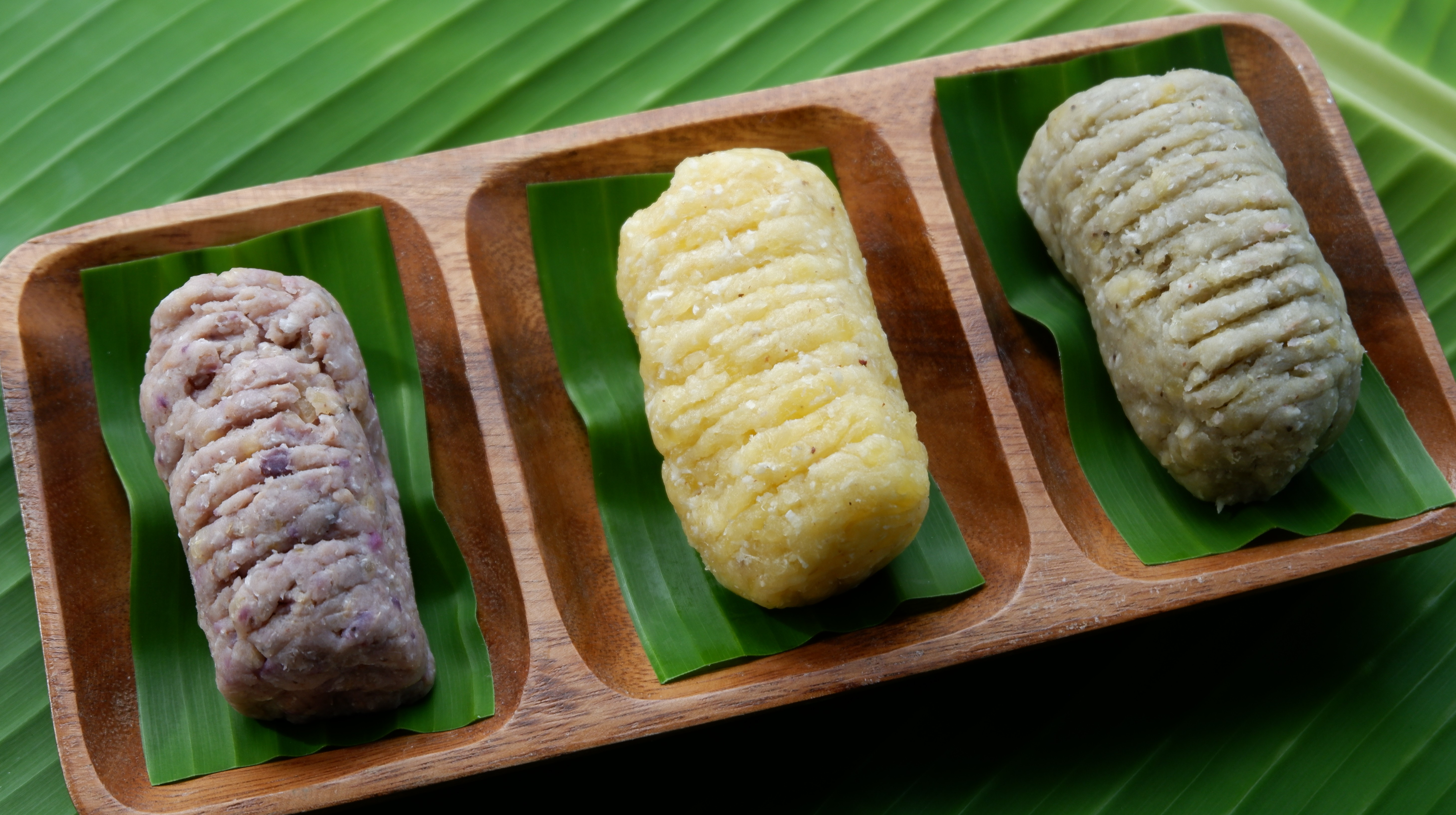
- Nilupak na ube (purple yam), kamoteng kahoy (cassava), and saba (plantain)
- Alternative names: Nilusak, halaya, haleya, minukmok
- Course: Dessert
- Place of origin: Philippines
- Region or state: Batangas, Quezon, Calabarzon

Nilupak is a class of traditional Filipino delicacies made from mashed or pounded starchy foods mixed with coconut milk (or condensed milk and butter) and sugar. They are molded into various shapes and traditionally served on banana leaves with toppings of grated young coconut (buko), various nuts, cheese, butter, or margarine. It is also known as nilusak, linusak, niyubak, linupak, or lubi-lubi, among many other names, in the various languages of the Philippines. It is also known as minukmok in Quezon.

== Names ==
The term nilupak means "mashed" or "pounded", from the Tagalog verb lupak, "to pound [into a pulp] (with a mortar and pestle)". It is also known as nilusak in Visayan regions with the same meaning. They were traditionally pounded in large stone or wood mortar and pestle.

In Philippine Spanish, nilupak was known as jalea ("jam"), which became spelled as halaya, haleya, or halea in the native languages. This term is especially used for nilupak na ube, which is now more commonly known as ube halaya. Generally, however, the term nilupak is reserved for the variants made with mashed cassava or saba bananas. While the variants made from ube (purple yam) is known as halaya. Variants made from sweet potato and taro can be known as either halaya or nilupak. Regardless, nilupak and halaya are prepared identically, varying only in their main ingredients.

== Types ==
Types of nilupak include the following:

- Calabaza – known as halayang kalabasa, "squash halaya", or "pumpkin jam".
- Cassava – known as nilupak na balinghoy or nilupak na kamoteng kahoy
- Saba banana – known as nilupak na saging, nilupak na saba, or linuyang
- Sweet potato – known as camote halaya, nilupak na camote, "camote delight", or "sweet potato jam".
- Taro corms – known as nilupak na gabi; a notable variant is binagol and it may also be mixed with ube to make nilupak na ube at gabi
- Ube – known more commonly as ube halaya, "ube jam", or nilupak na ube

== See also ==
- Cassava cake
- Pitsi-pitsi
- Poi
- Suman
- Ube halaya
