= Ube halaya =

Philippine dessert made from purple yam

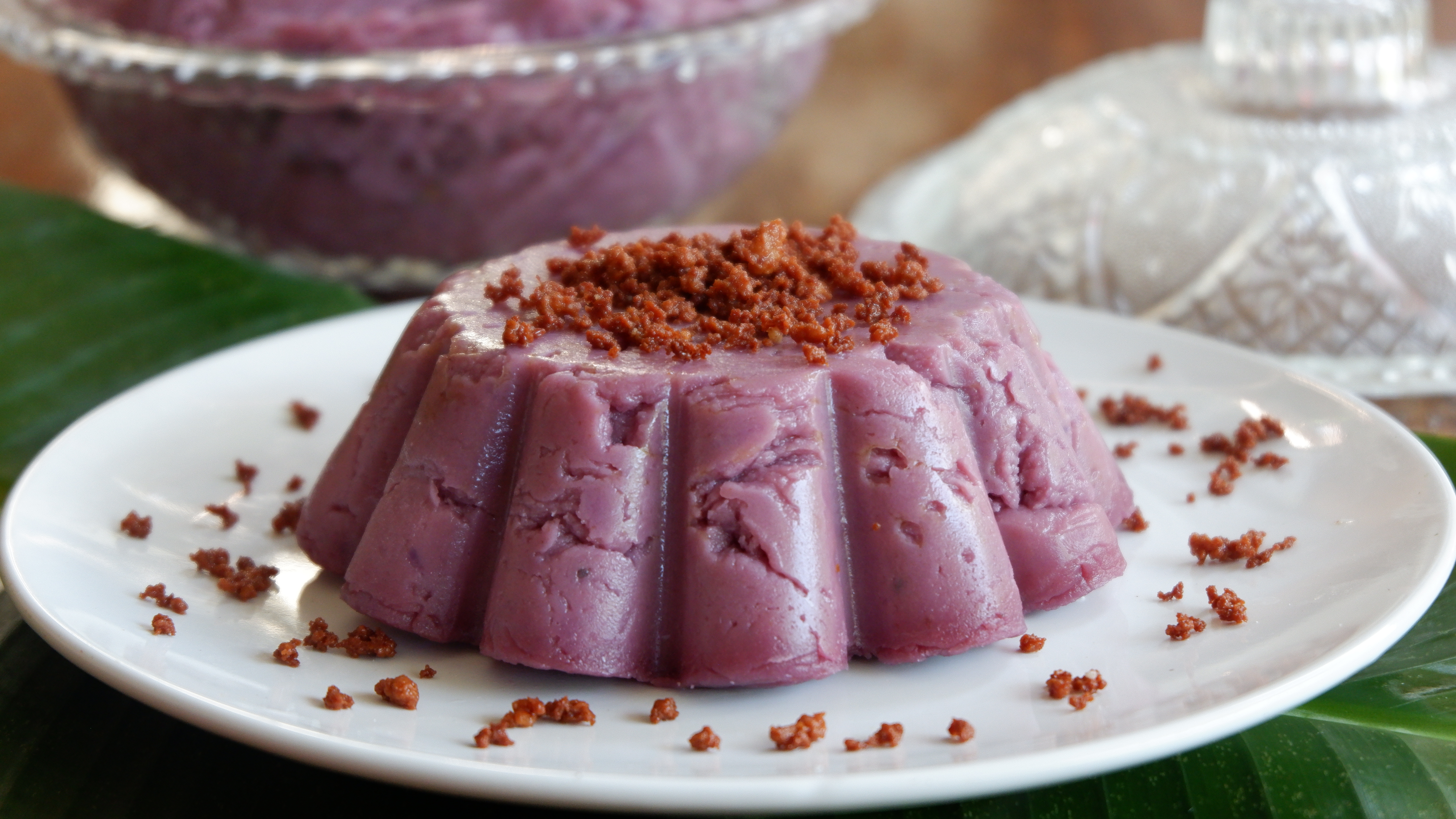
- Alternative names: Ube jam, halayang ube, purple yam jam
- Course: dessert
- Place of origin: Philippines
- Region or state: Philippines
- Serving temperature: Cold
- Main ingredients: Mashed ube, coconut milk and/or condensed milk, butter. sugar
- Similar dishes: Taro purée

Ube halaya or halayang ube (also spelled halea, haleya; from Spanish jalea 'jelly') is a Filipino dessert made from boiled and mashed ube, cooked with coconut milk or cow's milk, butter and sugar. As plain boiled ube is nearly flavorless similar to kamote (sweet potato), taro (known as gabi locally) and other root crops, the "ube flavor" is really the flavor of ube halaya. Ube halaya is the main base in ube-flavored pastries and ube ice cream. It can also be incorporated in other desserts such as halo-halo. It is also commonly anglicized as ube jam.

== History ==
The Philippines shows the highest phenotypic diversity of ube, making it one of the likely centers of origin of ube domestication. Remains of ube have been recovered from the Ille Cave archaeological site in Barangay New Ibajay, El Nido, Palawan (c. 11,000 BP).

== Preparation ==
The main ingredient is peeled and boiled ube which is grated and mashed. The mashed yam, with condensed milk (originally sweetened coconut milk) and added sugar, is added to a saucepan of melted butter or margarine. The mixture is stirred until thickened. Once thickened, the mixture is cooled down and placed on a platter or into containers of various shapes.

Ube halaya is typically served cold, after refrigeration. Optional toppings include browned grated coconut meat, latík, or condensed milk.

== Variations ==
Ube halaya is a type of nilupak (mashed/pounded starchy food with coconut milk and sugar) which has several variants that use other types of starchy root crops or fruits. Generally, the term halaya is reserved for nilupak made with ube and calabaza, while nilupak is more commonly used for variants made with mashed cassava or saba bananas. Variants made from sweet potato and taro can be known as either halaya or nilupak.

Ube halaya also superficially resembles kalamay ube, but differs in that kalamay ube additionally uses ground glutinous rice (galapóng) and has smoother more viscous texture.

=== Ube macapuno ===
Ube halaya served with macapuno (coconut sport) is a notable combination known as ube macapuno. The combination is also used in other ube recipes, like in ube cakes and ube ice cream.

=== Camote halaya ===
Camote halaya, sometimes known as "camote delight" or "sweet potato jam", is a variant that uses mashed sweet potato (camote) instead of ube. It is prepared identically to ube halaya. It has a light yellow color to bright orange to purple color, depending on the cultivar of sweet potato used. It is traditionally known as nilupak na kamote, especially when served on banana leaves. Purple versions of camote halaya can sometimes be confused with or used as a substitute for ube halaya.

=== Halayang kalabasa ===
Halayang kalabasa, also known as "squash halaya" or "pumpkin jam", is a variant that uses mashed calabaza (kalabasa). It is prepared identically to ube halaya. It is typically orange to light brown in color.

=== Binagol ===
Binagol is a unique version from the Eastern Visayas which use mashed giant taro corms. Its distinct packaging are halved coconut shells. It can range in color from creamy white to brown.

=== Nilupak na ube at gabi ===
Nilupak na ube at gabi is a Tagalog version that combines ube with taro corms.

== See also ==
- Maja blanca – Filipino pudding of coconut milk and cornstarch
- Nilupak – Class of traditional Filipino delicacies
- Poi (dessert) – Traditional Samoan fruit dessert
- Ube cake – Traditional Filipino chiffon or sponge cake made with ube
- Ube ice cream – Filipino ice cream made with purple yam
- Filipino cuisine (traditional)
- List of sweet potato dishes
