= Kalamay =

Filipino sweet

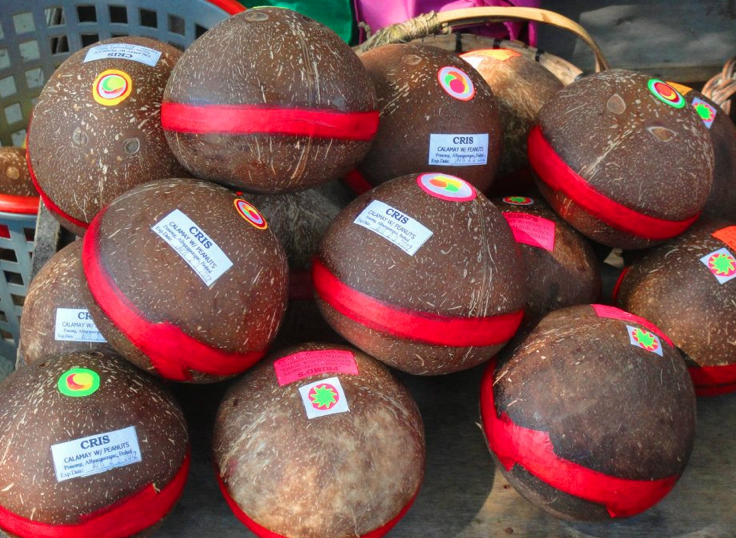
- Kalamay from the province of Bohol, packaged inside empty coconut shells. It is a well-known sweet dish from Bohol Province, particularly in the town of Jagna.
- Alternative names: Calamay
- Course: Dessert
- Place of origin: Philippines
- Region or state: Visayas, Luzon
- Serving temperature: Hot, room temperature, cold
- Main ingredients: Coconut milk, glutinous rice, brown sugar
- Variations: Biko

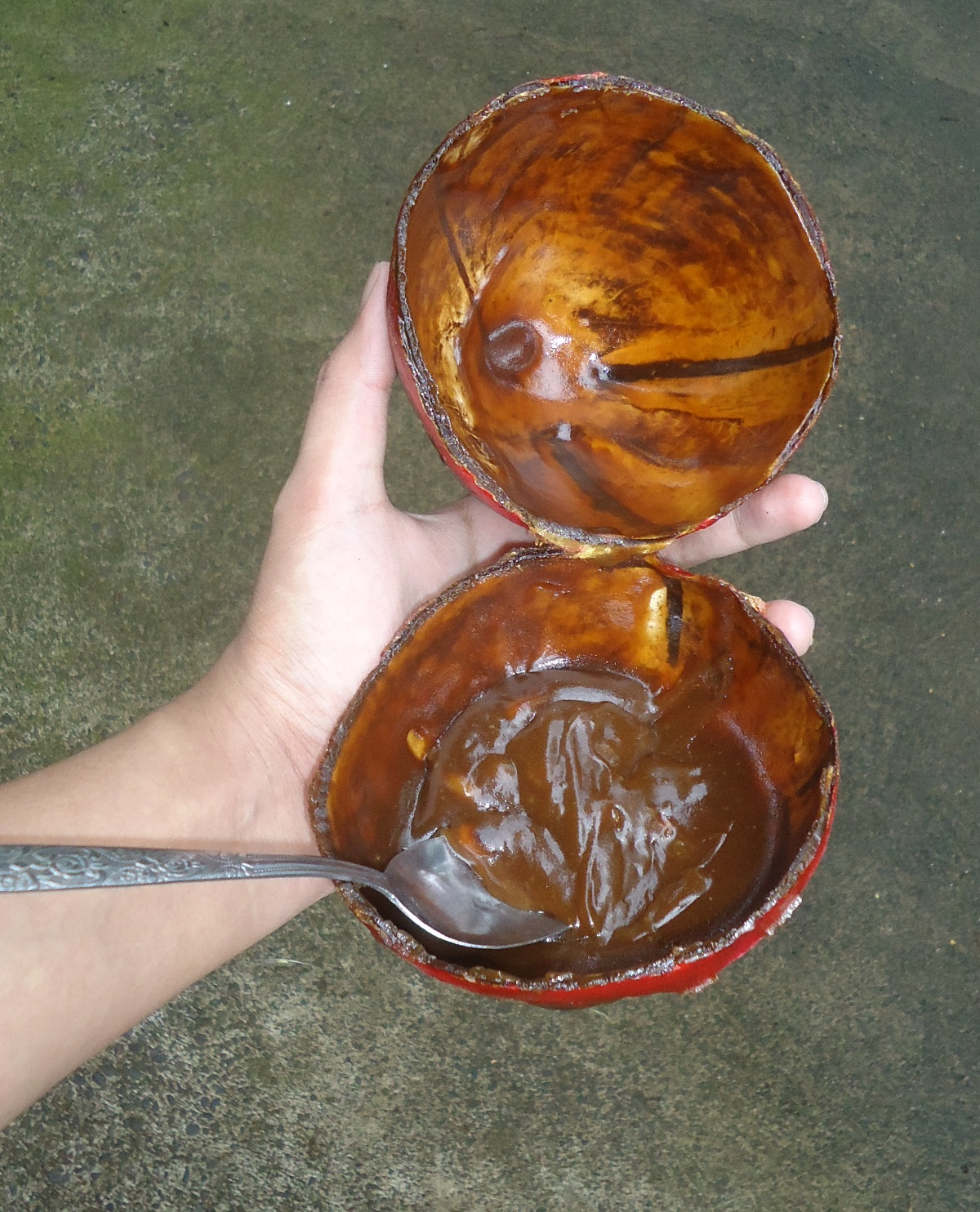
Opened kalamay inside the coconut shell

Kalamay (also spelled calamay, literally 'sugar') is a sticky sweet that is known in many regions of the Philippines. It is made of coconut milk, brown sugar, and ground glutinous rice. It can also be flavored with margarine, peanut butter, or vanilla. Kalamay can be eaten alone, but is usually used as a sweetener for a number of Filipino desserts and beverages. It is related to the Chamorro dessert called kalamai.

== Preparation ==
Kalamay is made by extracting coconut milk from grated coconuts twice. Glutinous rice is added to the first batch of coconut milk and the mixture is ground into a paste. Brown sugar is added to the second batch of coconut milk and boiled for several hours to make latík. The mixture of ground glutinous rice and coconut milk is then poured into the latík and stirred until the consistency becomes very thick. It can be served hot or at room temperature, especially when eaten with other dishes. Viscous kalamay are often served cooled to make it less runny and easier to eat.

== Consumption ==
Kalamay is a popular pasalubong (the Filipino tradition of a homecoming gift). They are often eaten alone, directly from the packaging. Kalamay is also used in a variety of traditional Filipino dishes as a sweetener, including the suman and the bukayo. It can also be added to beverages like coffee, milk, or hot chocolate.

Biko and sinukmani are similar dishes that use whole glutinous rice grains. The preparation is the same except that the glutinous rice is first cooked whole and not ground into a paste, and then is smothered with the latík. In some regions (particularly in the Northern Philippines), this dish is referred to as the kalamay, with the viscous kind differentiated as the kalamay-hati.

The latík from kalamay by itself can be used with other desserts, particularly with dishes made from cassava (which is then referred to as 'cassava kalamay'). Kalamay is also commonly confused with matamis sa bao, a similar viscous dish. However, the latter does not use rice.

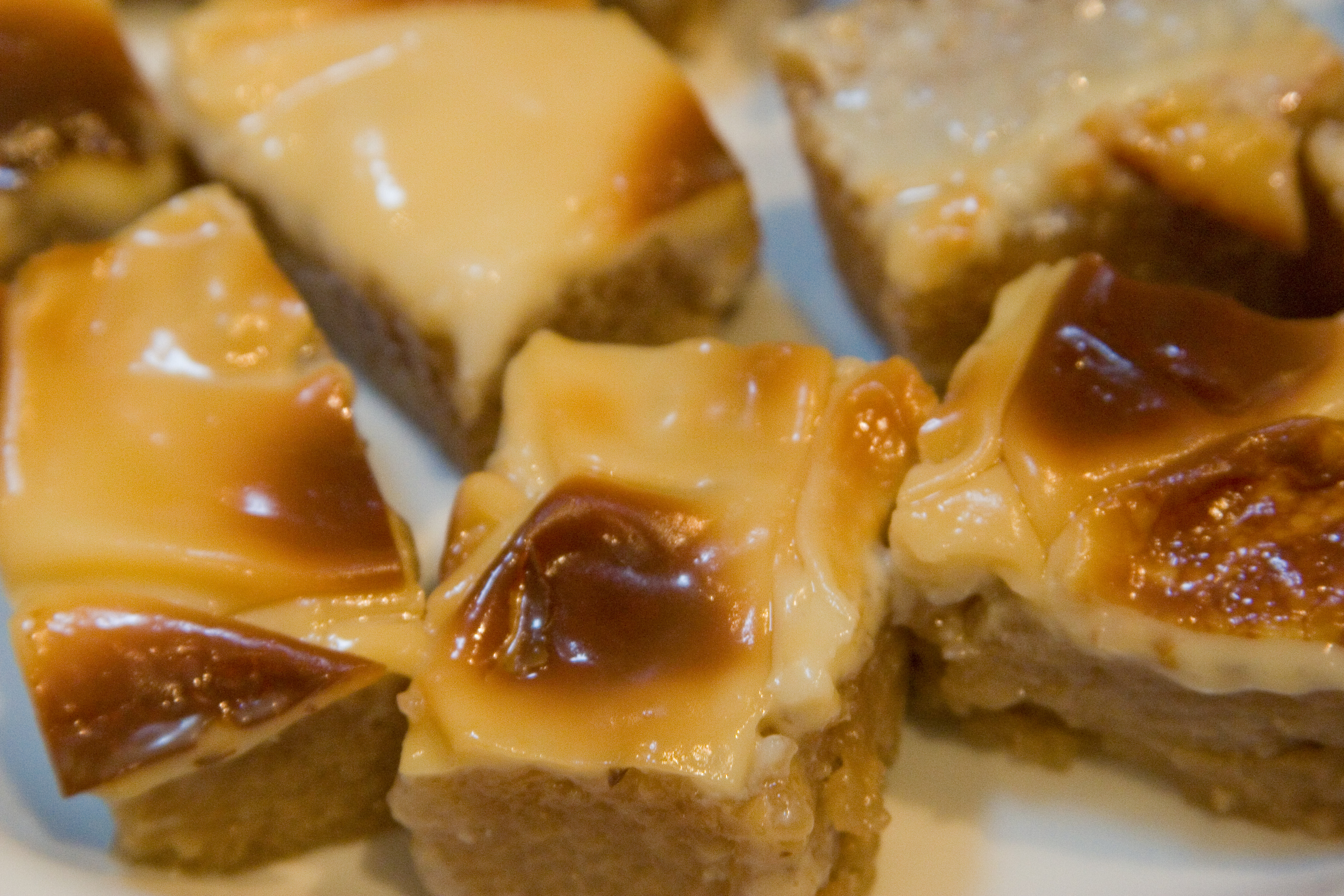
Biko topped with caramel-like latik

== Types ==
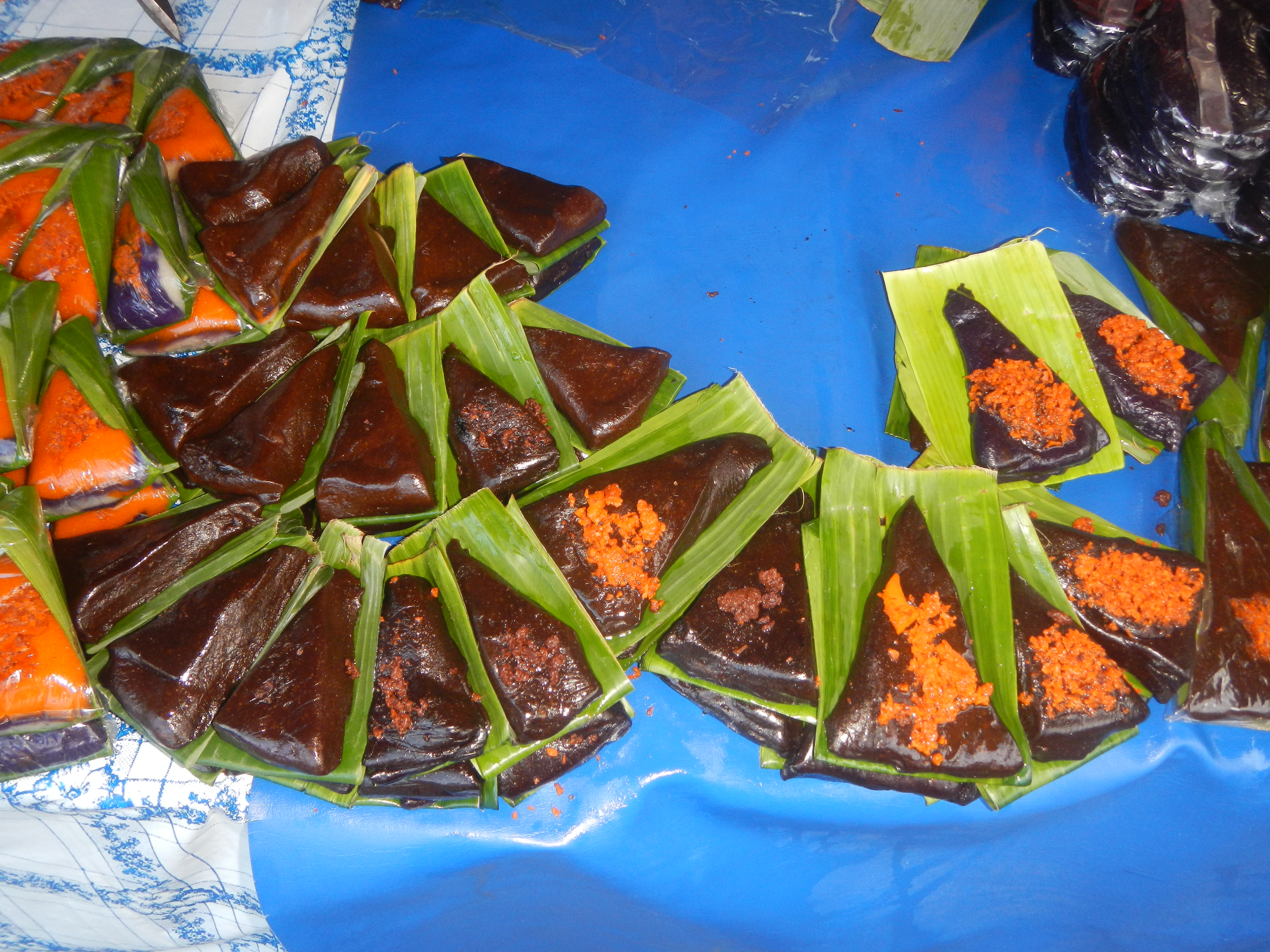
Kalamay slices on banana leaves from Bustos, Bulacan

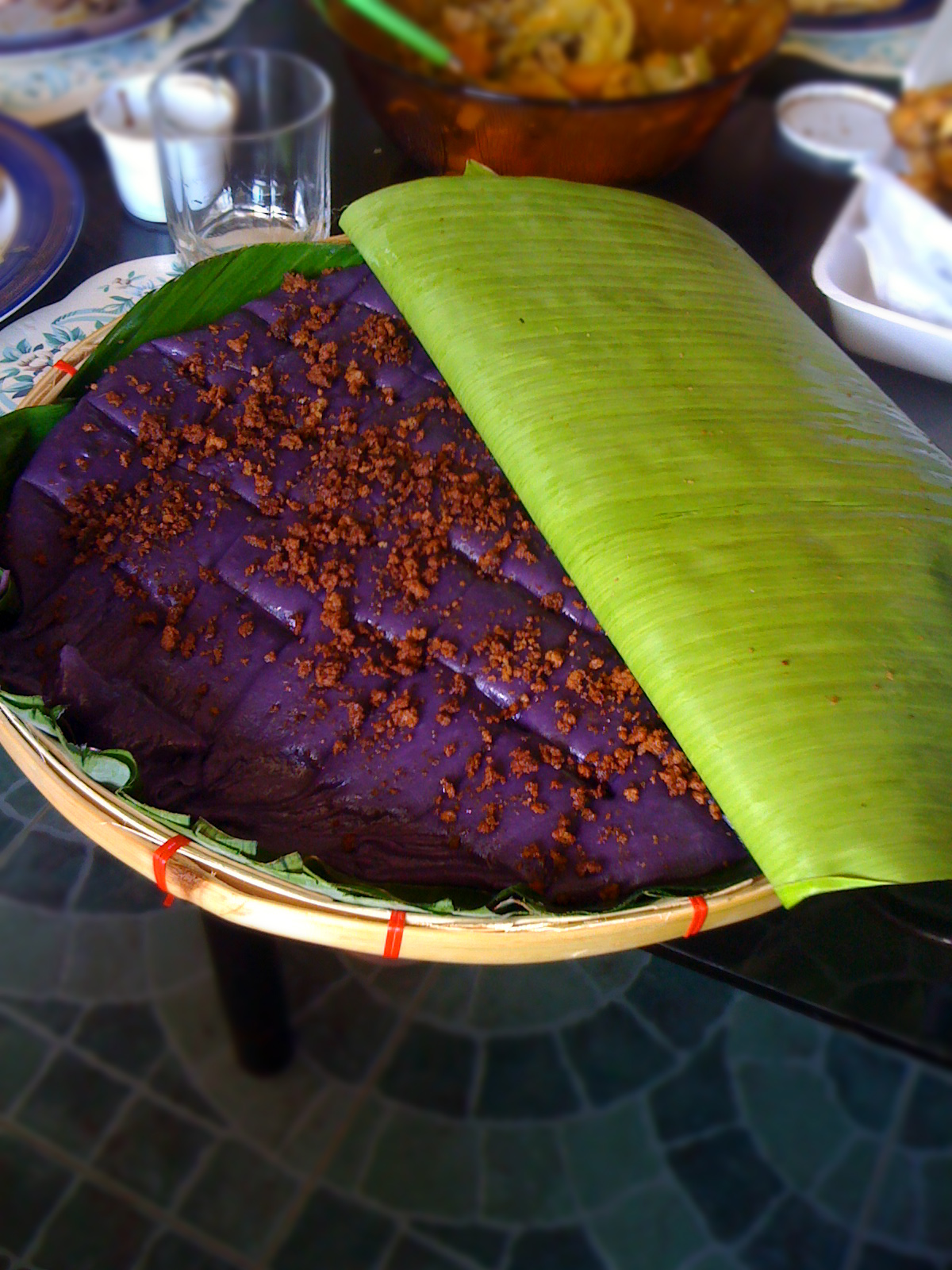
Kalamay ube is naturally purple due to the use of purple yam.

There are many variations and types of kalamay. Kalamay can be divided roughly into two types: the syrupy kind used in conjunction with other dishes (higher latik ratio), and the gummy, chewy kind which is more expensive and usually eaten on its own.

- Antipolo kalamay (also called kalamay perya) – the Tagalog version of kalamay. It is a specialty of Antipolo. It is traditionally served as a flat disk on banana leaves, topped with latik curds. It has a denser, chewier texture.
- Bohol kalamay – kalamay from the island of Bohol can vary from extremely sweet to mildly sweet. It is distinctive for being sold inside halved smooth coconut shells (the mesocarp of coconuts, locally known as bagol or paya). These containers are then sealed shut with a characteristic red crepe paper (papel de japon). This type of packaging is known as kalamay-hati (literally 'Half kalamay'). A type of Bohol kalamay is called "calamay sa Jagna" which is a famous delicacy from the town of Jagna. It has a distinct taste. The "calamay sa Jagna" was taught intentionally by a parish priest of Jagna named Rev.Fr. Mariano Gutierrez of the Order of the Augustinian Recollects particularly in Barangay Can-upao.
- Baguio Kalamay – a type of kalamay from Baguio, Philippines. It is also known as Sundot Kulangot (literally 'Picked Booger') because of its consistency. It is sweetened with molasses which adds to its color. It is uniquely packed into halved pitogo (Sago Palm of the genus Cycas) shells and sealed with red crepe paper in a similar manner to the Bohol kalamay. It is the smallest known traditional packaging of kalamay. They are sold in bundles with several of the kalamay balls nestled inside split bamboo and tied with a string.
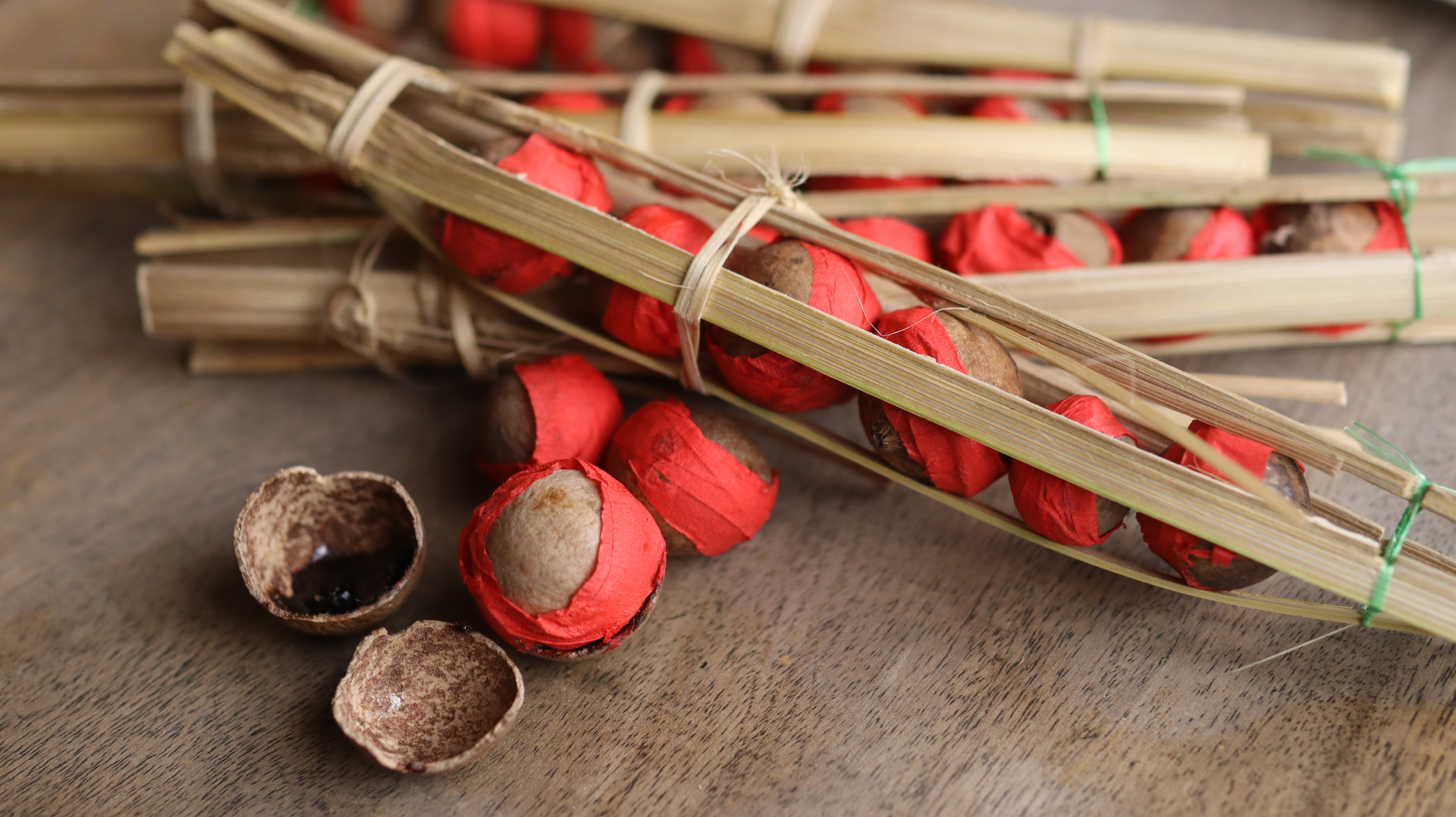
  Sundot Kulangot from Baguio
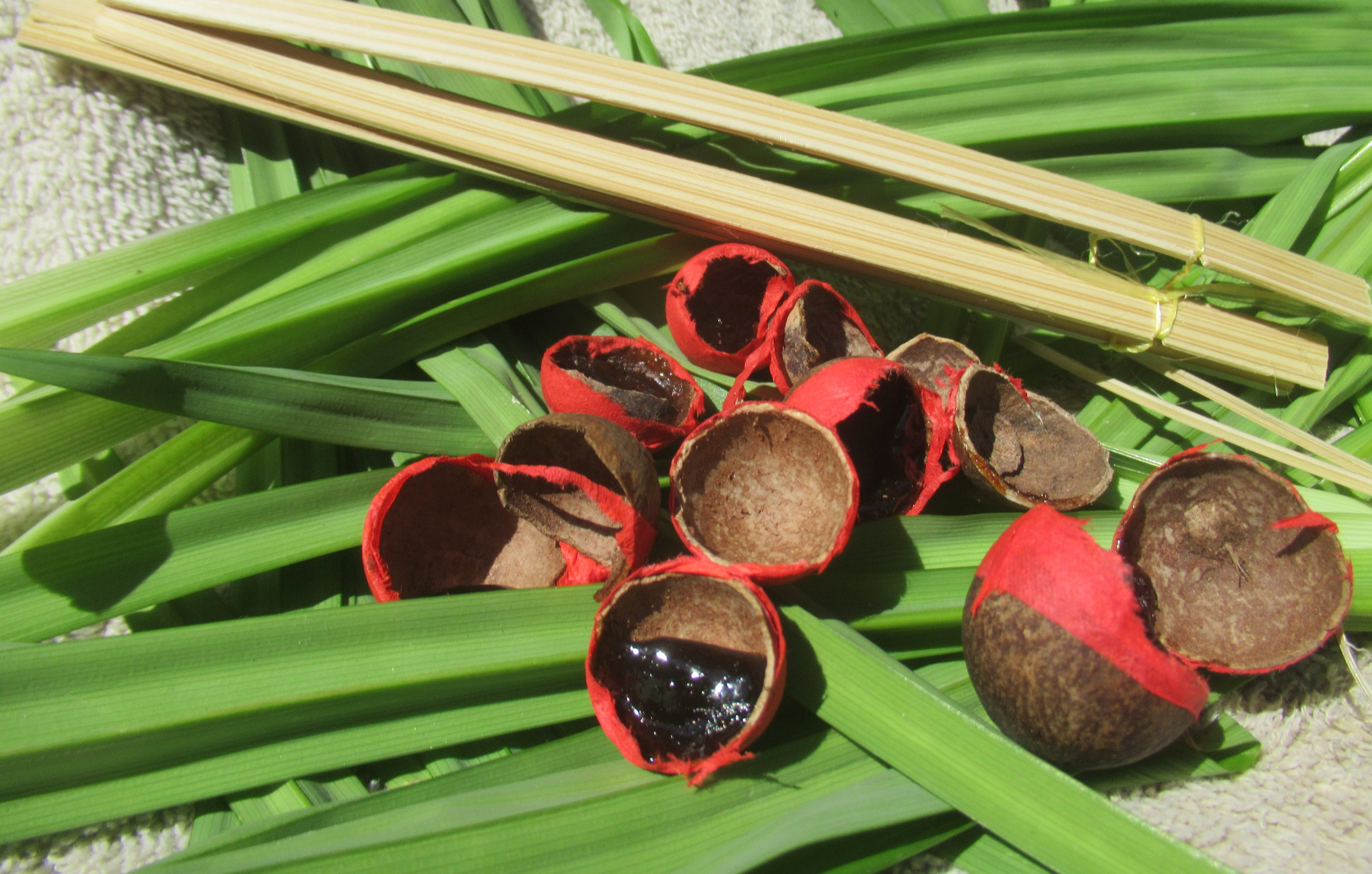
  "Sundot Kulangot" (Lingayen)
- Iloilo kalamay – kalamay (also known as kalamay-hati) from the province of Iloilo and the island of Negros. It is thicker in consistency than other types of kalamay. The town of San Enrique celebrates a Kalamay Festival.
- Candon kalamay – kalamay from Candon, Ilocos Sur. It is sold wrapped in banana leaves or in coconut shells, though modern packaging uses polystyrene containers wrapped in cellophane. Candon also celebrates a Kalamay Festival.
- Nilubyan or iniruban – a kind of kalamay made from pounded green rice. It originates from Camiling, Tarlac in the Northern Philippines.
- Mindoro kalamay – a version of kalamay from the island of Mindoro. It usually contains grated coconut and is flavored with peanut butter or vanilla.
- Indang kalamay (also called calamay buna) – is a sweet delicacy of sticky rice, brown sugar and coconut milk that is well known in Indang Cavite. This variety of calamay from Indang is made from glutinous pulverized rice called malagkit mixed with coconut milk and panutsa (native jaggery).

Similar to other traditional kakanin rice cakes, kalamay also has variants based on secondary ingredients. They include:

- Kalamay gabi – kalamay made with taro (gabi). It is typically milky white in color.
- Kalamay na pinpipig (also known as kalamay na duman or kalamay pandan) – kalamay flavored with pandan leaf extracts and topped with toasted and pounded immature rice grains (pinipig or duman). It is bright green in color.
- Kalamay ube – kalamay made with ube (purple yam). It is lavender or purple in color. It superficially resembles ube halaya, but has a smoother texture.

== Origin ==
Kalamay, in many Visayan languages (particularly Hiligaynon), is synonymous with 'sugar' (extracted from sugarcane). The word is usually elided to kamay in modern Cebuano dialects. In the Waray language, kalamay refers to a hardened cake of molasses used as sweeteners for many cooked desserts. Its production has been known since the Spanish colonization of the Philippines.

== Similar desserts ==
A cousin of kalamay is dodol, found in Indonesia, Malaysia, Brunei, Singapore and in some parts of the Philippines. It uses similar basic ingredients and preparation. Dodol, however, is a solid candy, unlike the liquid kalamay. Kalamay is visually similar to the Chinese nian gao (also known as tikoy in the Philippines), but they are not related.

== See also ==
- Balikucha
- Binagol
- Bukayo
- Coconut jam
- Coconut toffee
- Dodol
- Espasol
- Kakanin
- Kalamai
- Latík
- Sapin-sapin
- Suman
- Wajik
