= Binagol =

Filipino sweet steamed delicacy

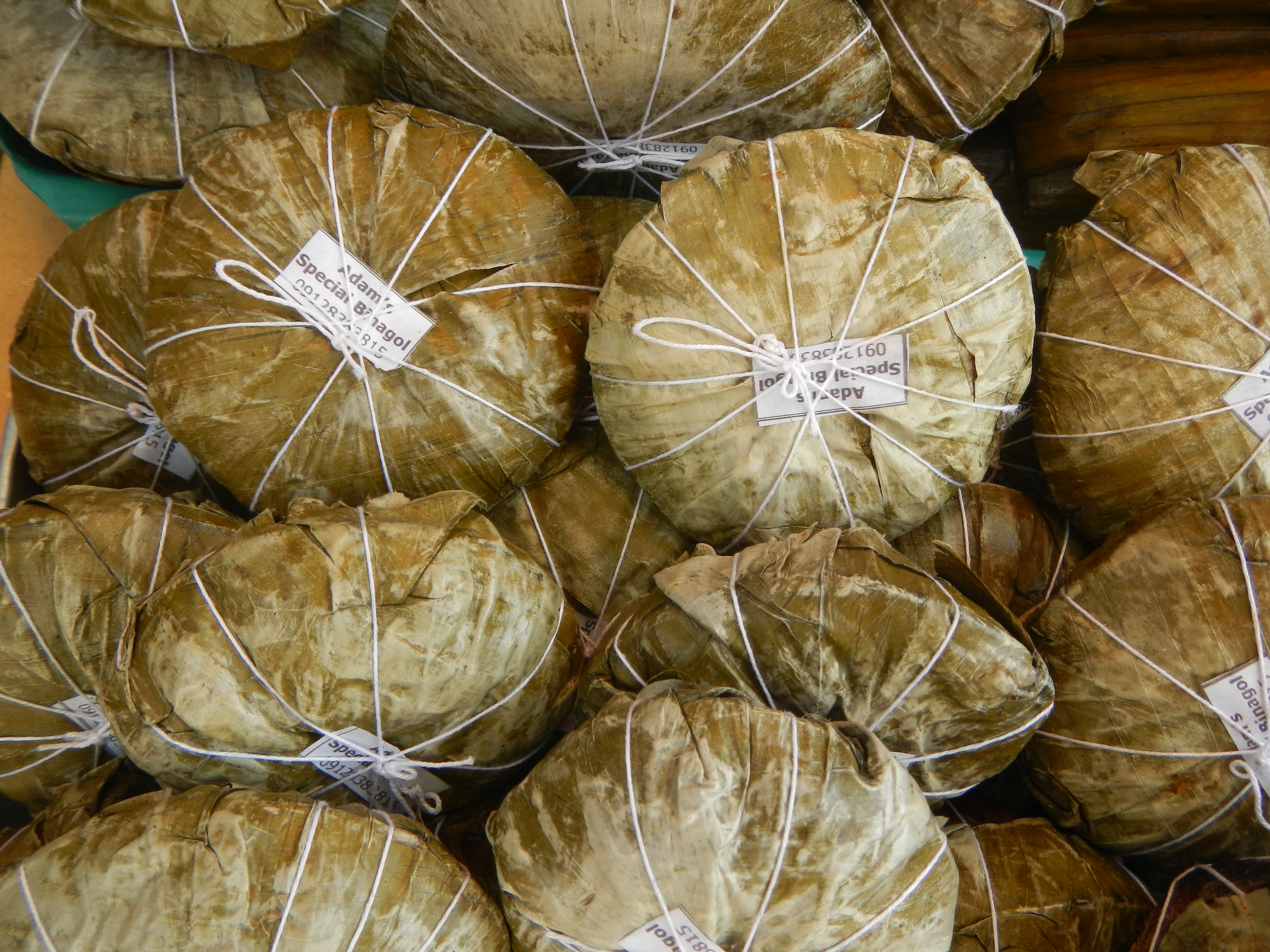
- Alternative names: Binangol
- Course: Dessert
- Place of origin: Philippines
- Region or state: Leyte, Samar
- Main ingredients: giant taro, condensed milk, coconut milk, sugar, egg

Binagol is a Filipino sweet steamed delicacy of the Waray people made from mashed giant taro corms, condensed milk, sugar, coconut milk, and egg yolks. It is distinctively placed in half of a coconut shell and then wrapped in banana leaves and twine. The name means "placed in a coconut shell", from the Visayan bagol (coconut shell). Binagol traditionally uses the corms of the giant taro (locally known as talyan or talian); however, the corms of the taro (known in Tagalog as gabi and in Eastern Visayas, where the delicacy originates, as gaway) is also alternatively used. It is a type of nilupak.

== See also ==
- Kalamay
- Moron (food)
- Ube halaya
