= Kalamai (dessert) =

Traditional Chamorro corn and coconut pudding

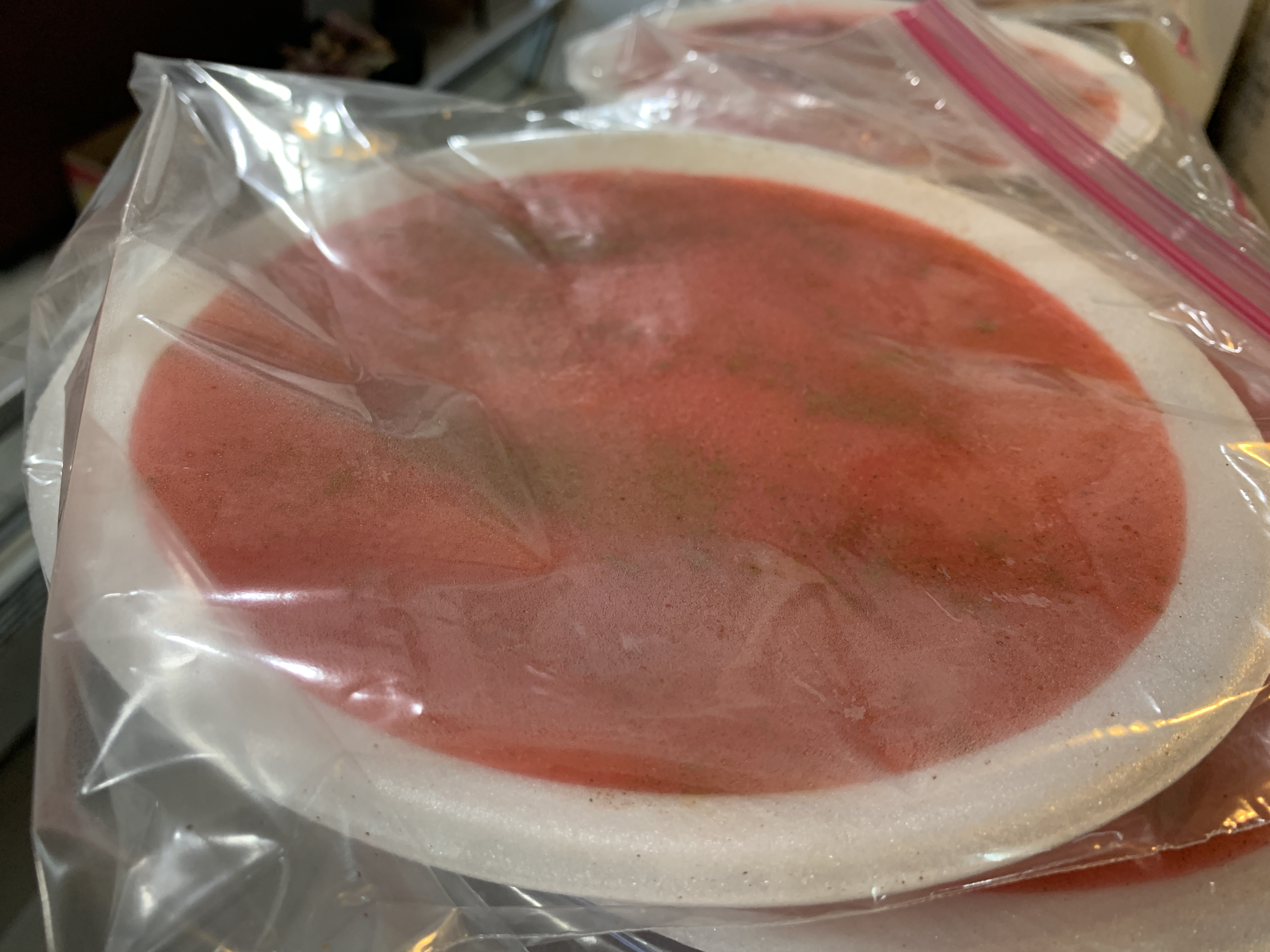
- Kalamai
- Type: Pudding
- Place of origin: United States
- Region or state: Guam, Mariana Islands
- Main ingredients: Masa harina, coconut milk, sugar, water

Kalamai is a traditional Chamorro corn and coconut pudding, sometimes referred to as coconut gelatin (though no gelatin is actually used). Original versions of kalamai called for masa harina, coconut milk, sugar, and water. Subsequently, cornstarch has been used to thicken the dessert. Red or green food coloring may be used to color the kalamai, followed by a sprinkling of cinnamon on the surface. A few recipes add vanilla for additional flavoring.

The kalamai mixture, once thickened, is traditionally poured into a low rimmed tray to a half-inch thickness. This dessert is cooled, then sliced into squares. The pudding-like version of kalamai has a very creamy, soft texture. This pudding is served just as a piece of pie is served. The gelatin-like recipe yields a dessert that is firm like Jell-O. It can be eaten with fingers. Both versions of kalamai have a very distinct coconut and masa harina flavor.

The name of kalamai is a loanword from Cebuano kalamay, when Guam was still part of the Spanish Philippines. It originally referred to a type of sticky rice pudding made with ground glutinous rice, coconut milk, and sugar. The Chamorro kalamai uses corn in place of rice, and thus resembles the Filipino maja blanca more.

== See also ==
- Kalamay
- Maja blanca
- Haupia
- Cuisine of the Mariana Islands
