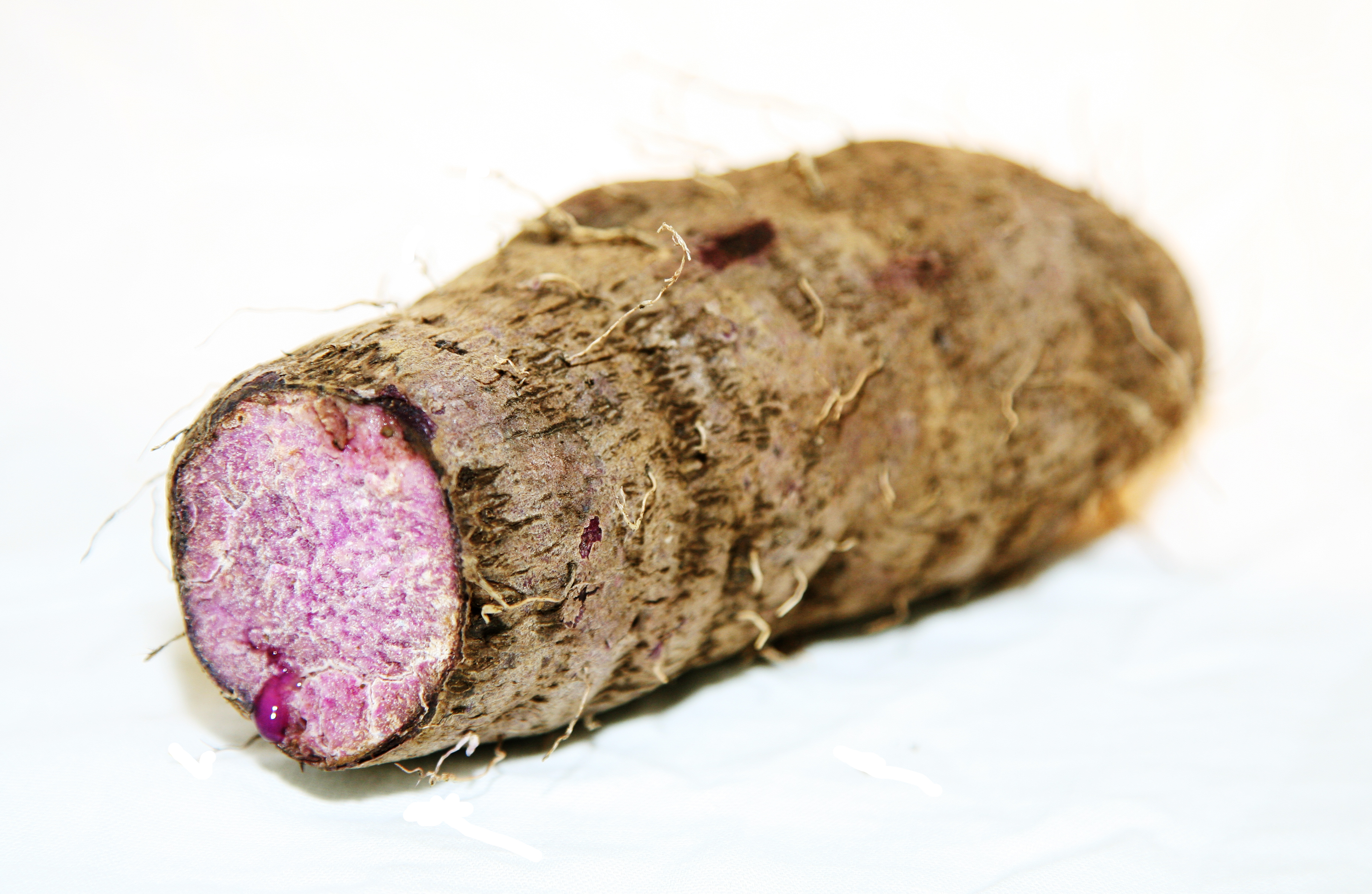
- Cross section of purple yam

Scientific classification
- Kingdom: Plantae
- Clade: Tracheophytes
- Clade: Angiosperms
- Clade: Monocots
- Order: Dioscoreales
- Family: Dioscoreaceae
- Genus: Dioscorea
- Species: D. alata

Binomial name
- Dioscorea alata L.

Synonyms
- List: Dioscorea atropurpurea Roxb.; Dioscorea colocasiifolia Pax; Dioscorea eburina Lour.; Dioscorea eburnea Lour.; Dioscorea globosa Roxb.; Dioscorea javanica Queva; Dioscorea purpurea Roxb.; Dioscorea rubella Roxb.; Dioscorea sapinii De Wild.; Dioscorea sativa Munro; Dioscorea vulgaris Miq.; Elephantodon eburnea (Lour.) Salisb.; Polynome alata (L.) Salisb.

= Dioscorea alata =

Species of yam

Dioscorea alata – also called ube (Note: in Philippine English, /ˈuːbɛ, -beɪ/), ubi, uwhi (Note: in New Zealand English), purple yam, winged yam, or greater yam, among many other names – is a species of yam (a tuber). The tubers are usually a vivid violet-purple to bright lavender (hence the common name), but some range from creamy-white to plain white. Although it is sometimes confused with taro and the Okinawa sweet potato beniimo (紅芋) (Ipomoea batatas 'Ayamurasaki'), D. alata is also grown in Okinawa. Its origins are in the Asian and Oceanian tropics. Some varieties attain great size. A mambatap greater yam grown in Maprik, East Sepik Province, Papua New Guinea, around 1939 was 3.5 m (11 ft) in length.

== Names ==
The name ube is derived from Tagalog in the Philippines, while uwhi derives from Māori in New Zealand; both are doublets ultimately from proto-Austronesian *qubi.

Because it has become naturalized following its origins in Asia, specifically the Philippines through tropical South America, and the Southeastern United States, D. alata is referred to by many different names in these regions. In English alone, aside from purple yam, other anglicized names include ten-months yam, water yam, white yam, winged yam, violet yam, Guyana arrowroot, or simply yam.

== History of cultivation ==
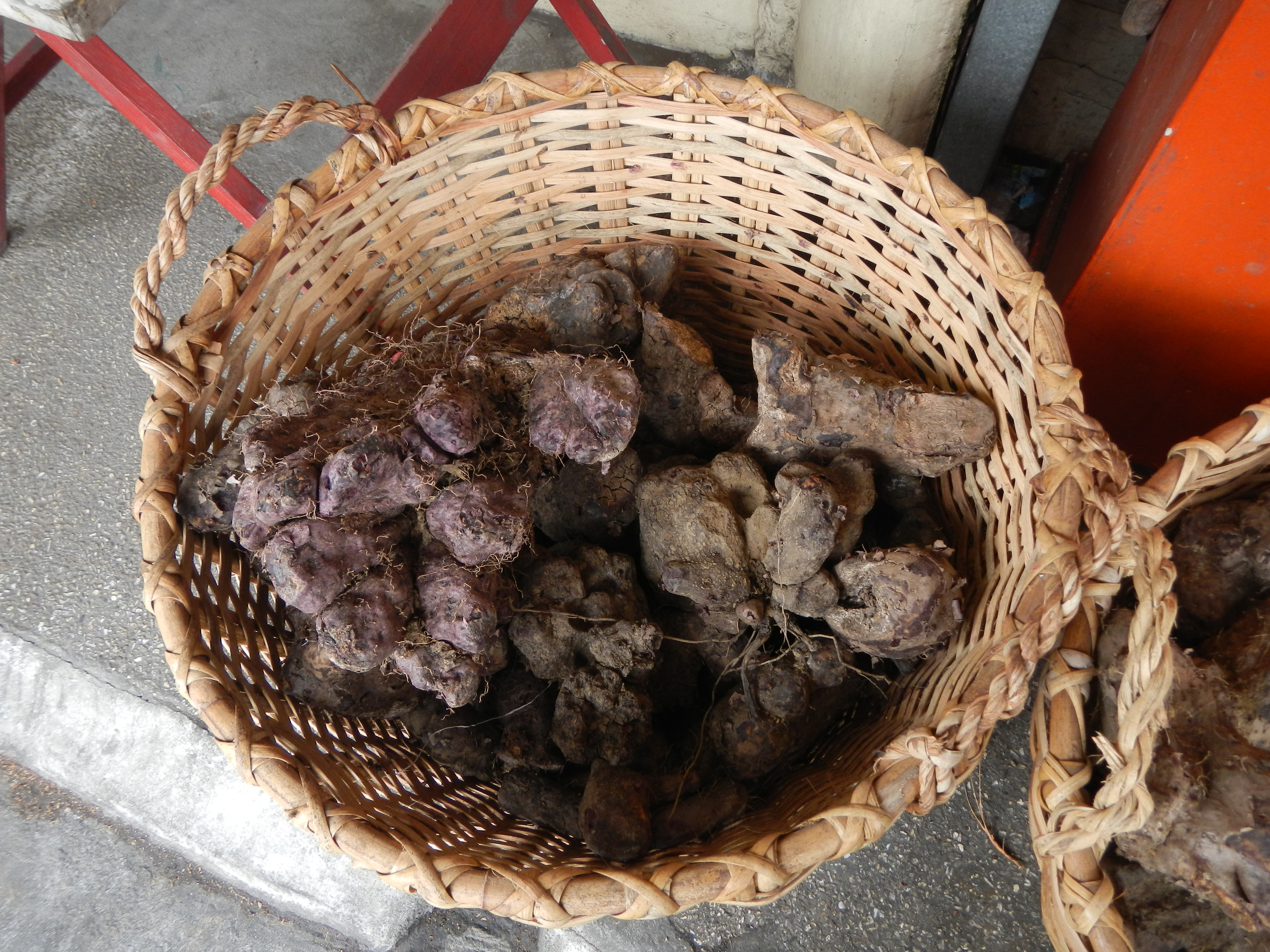
Harvested purple yam tubers

Dioscorea alata is one of the most important staple crops in Austronesian cultures. It is one of various species of yams that were domesticated and cultivated independently within Island Southeast Asia and New Guinea for their starchy tubers, including the round yam (Dioscorea bulbifera), ubi gadung (Dioscorea hispida), lesser yam (Dioscorea esculenta), Pacific yam (Dioscorea nummularia), fiveleaf yam (Dioscorea pentaphylla), and pencil yam (Dioscorea transversa). Among these, D. alata and D. esculenta were the only ones regularly cultivated and eaten, while the rest were usually considered as famine food due to their higher levels of the toxin dioscorine, which requires that they be prepared correctly before consumption. D. alata is also cultivated more than D. esculenta, largely because of its much larger tubers.

D. alata and D. esculenta were the most suitable for long transport in Austronesian ships, so were carried through all or most of the range of the Austronesian expansion. D. alata in particular was introduced into the Pacific Islands and New Zealand. They were also carried by Austronesian voyagers into Madagascar and the Comoros.

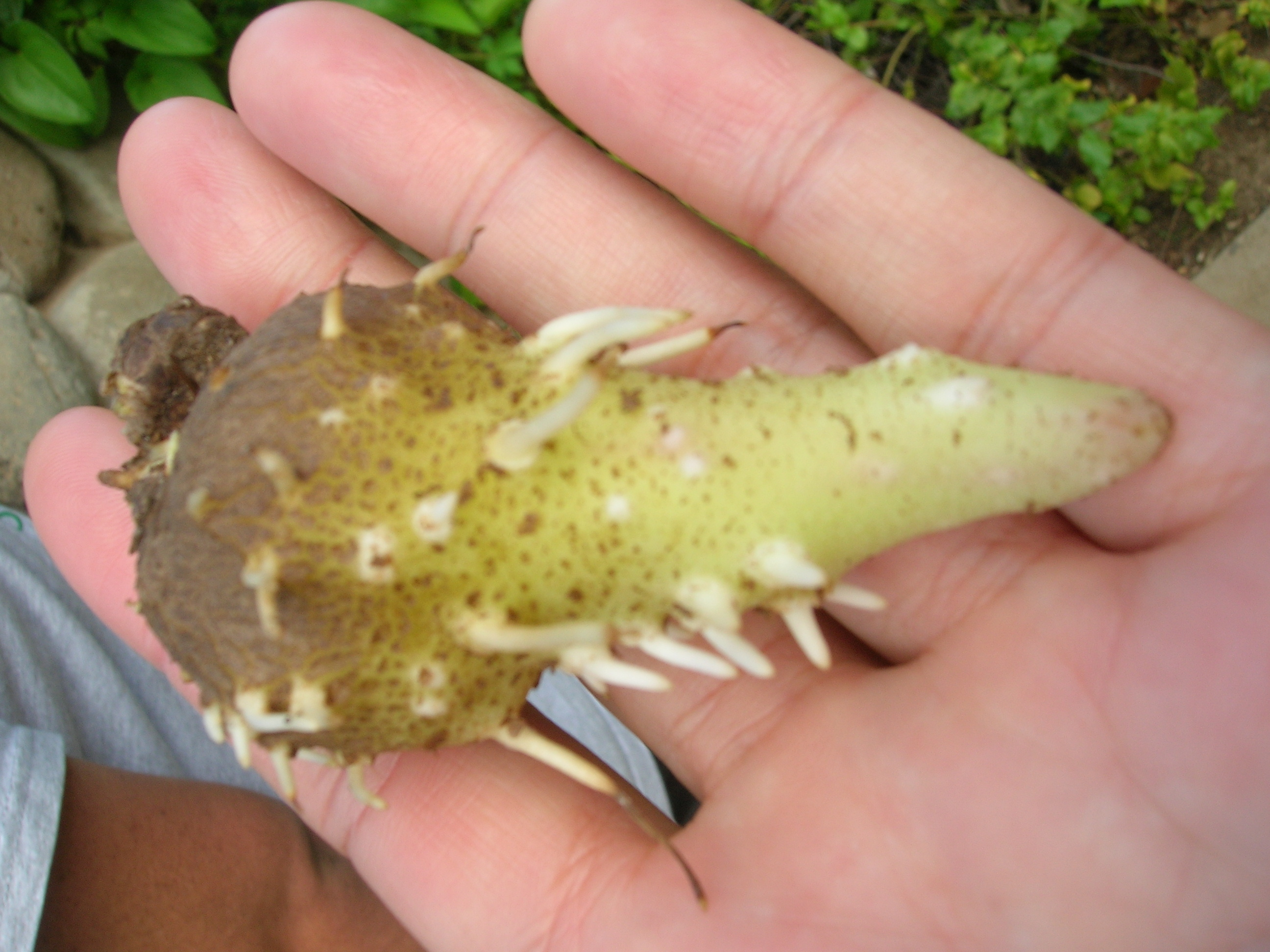
Aerial bulbil of a white variety of D. alata

The center of origin of purple yam is in the Philippines, but archaeological evidence suggests that it was exploited in Island Southeast Asia and New Guinea before the Austronesian expansion. Purple yam is believed to be a true cultigen, only known from its cultivated forms. The vast majority of cultivars are sterile, which restricts its introduction into islands purely by human agency, making them a good indicator of human movement. Some authors have proposed, without evidence, an origin in Mainland Southeast Asia, but it shows the greatest phenotypic variability in the Philippines and New Guinea.

Based on archaeological evidence of early farming plots and plant remains in the Kuk Swamp site, authors have suggested that it was first domesticated in the highlands of New Guinea from around 10,000 BP and spread into Island Southeast Asia via the Lapita culture around 4,000 BP, along with D. nummularia and D. bulbifera. In turn, D. esculenta is believed to have been introduced by the Lapita culture into New Guinea. Also, evidence exists of an agricultural revolution during this period brought by innovations from contact with Austronesians, including the development of wet cultivation.

Much older remains, though, identified as being probably D. alata, also have been recovered from the Niah Caves of Borneo (Late Pleistocene, less than 40,000 years BP) and the Ille Cave of Palawan ( 11,000 BP), along with remains of the toxic ubi gadung (D. hispida), which requires processing before it can be edible. Although it does not prove cultivation, it does show that humans already had the knowledge to exploit starchy plants and that D. alata was native to Island Southeast Asia. Furthermore, it opens the question on whether D. alata is a true species or was cultivated much earlier than commonly thought.

Purple yam remains an important crop in Southeast Asia, particularly in the Philippines, where the vividly purple variety is widely used in various traditional and modern desserts. It also remains important in Melanesia, where it is also grown for ceremonial purposes tied to the size of the tubers at harvest time. Its importance in eastern Polynesia and New Zealand, however, has waned after the introduction of other crops, most notably the sweet potato.

== Uses ==
=== Culinary ===
Purple yams have edible tubers with a mildly sweet, earthy, and nutty taste, reminiscent of sweet potatoes or taro. The violet cultivars, in particular, turn dishes distinctively vivid violet because of the high amount of anthocyanins. Purple yams are also valued for the starch that can be processed from them. Purple yam is most common in Philippine cuisine (where it is known as ube or ubi). It is widely applied for many Philippine desserts, such as ube cake, ube cheesecake and ube crinkles, as well as an ingredient or flavor for ice cream, milk, jam, donuts, tarts, and other types of pastries. It is often eaten boiled, baked, or as a sweetened dessert called ube halayá; the last is a popular ingredient in the iced dessert called halo-halo.

Purple yam desserts have more recently entered the United States, where there is a large Filipino diaspora population, under its Filipino name. It is particularly popular due to the striking violet-purple color it gives to desserts. The mid-2020s saw a boom in popularity internationally due to social media. However, this has caused shortages in the Philippines, forcing the country to import purple yams from Vietnam. To both protect and expand supply, the United States Department of Agriculture began a financial aid program for Filipino farmers, while its Filipino counterpart announced an indefinite moratorium on exports of fresh yams to reserve planting materials and increase production capacity to meet local demand.

Purple yam is commonly confused with purple/violet varieties of sweet potatoes because of their similarities in color, taste, and culinary uses. However, like other yams, purple yam tends to have a moister texture than sweet potatoes. Purple yams also have higher anthocyanin content than sweet potatoes. They can otherwise be used interchangeably in most recipes.

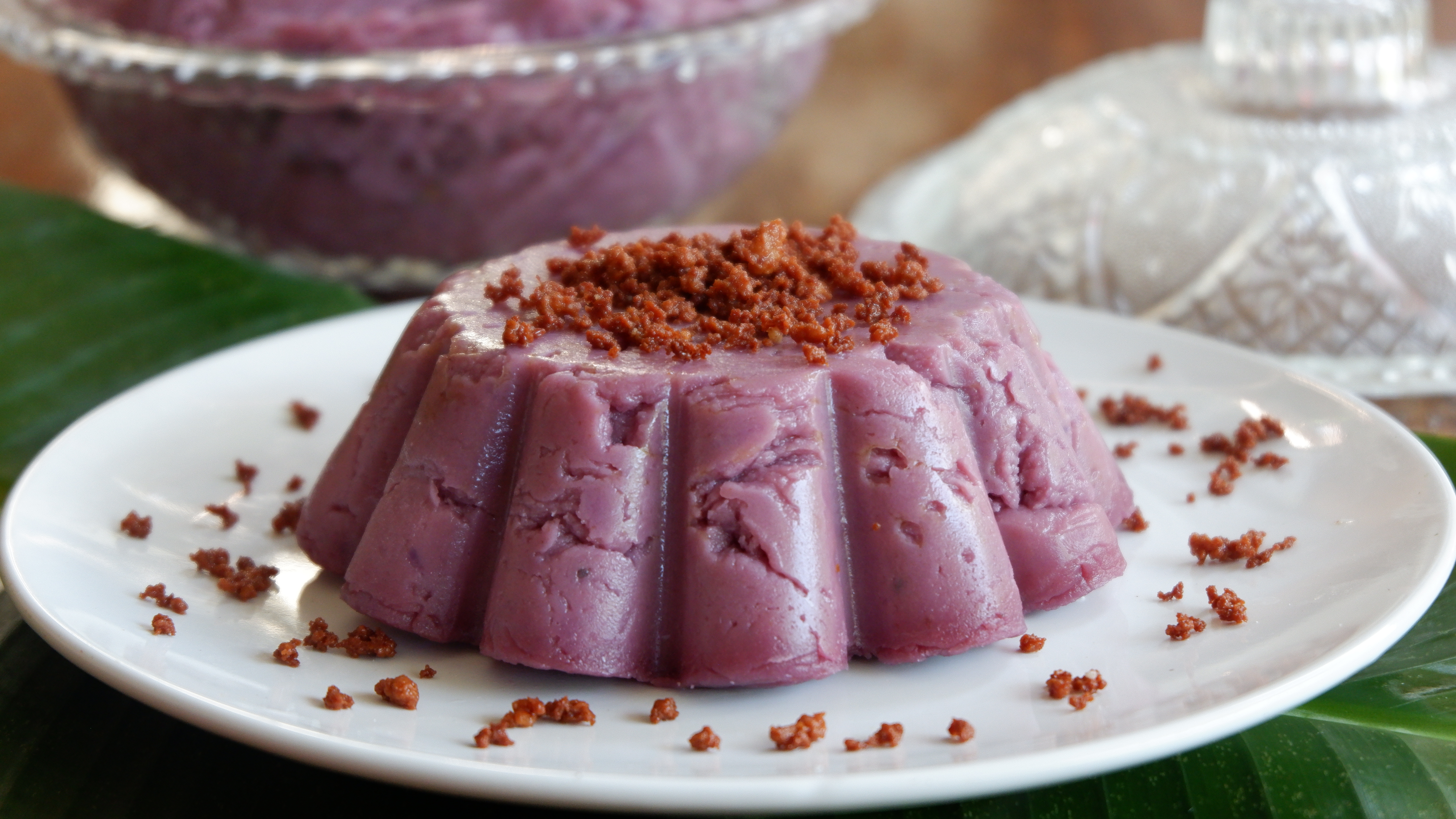
Ube halaya (mashed purple yam) from the Philippines

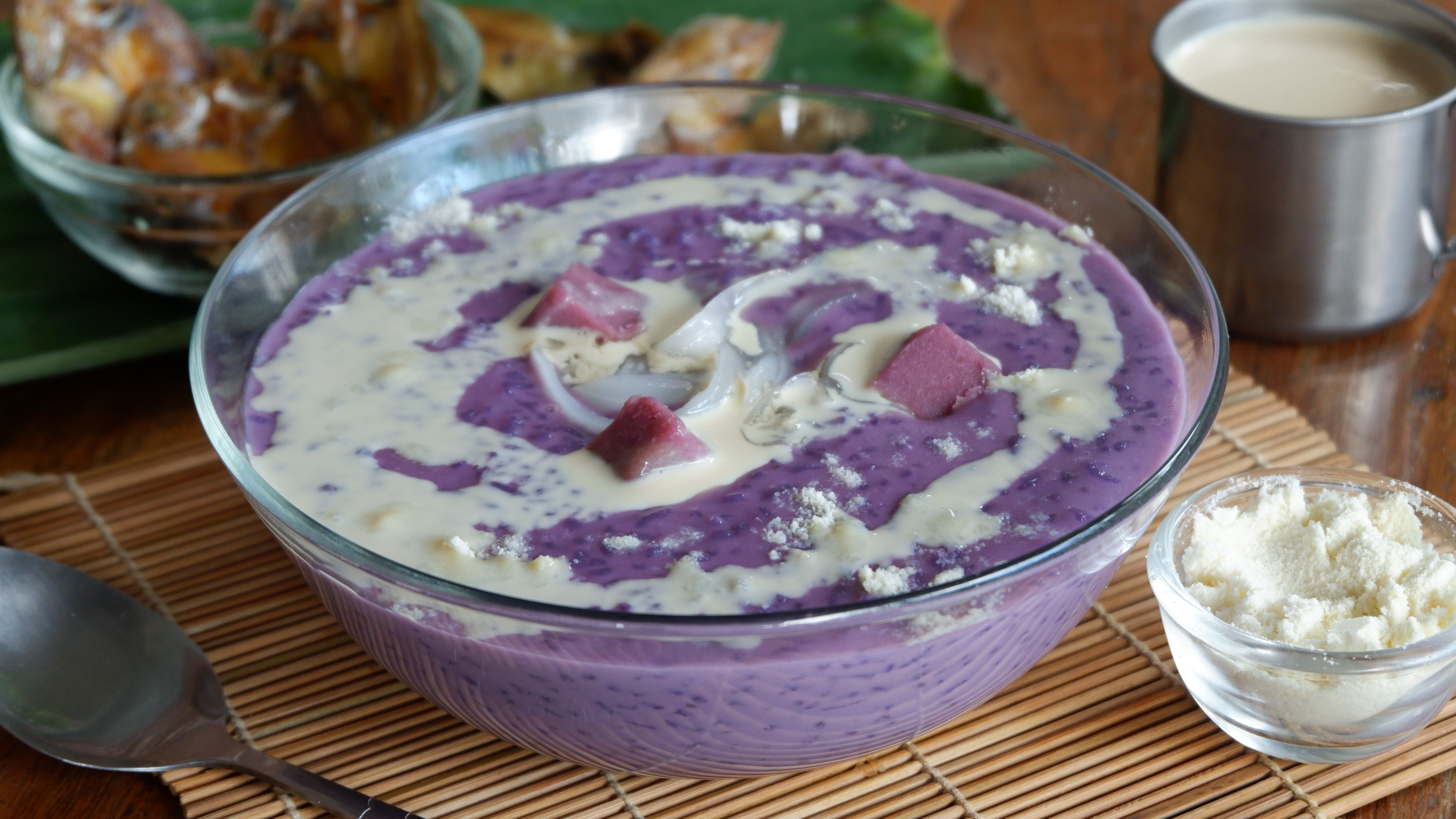
Ube champorado from the Philippines

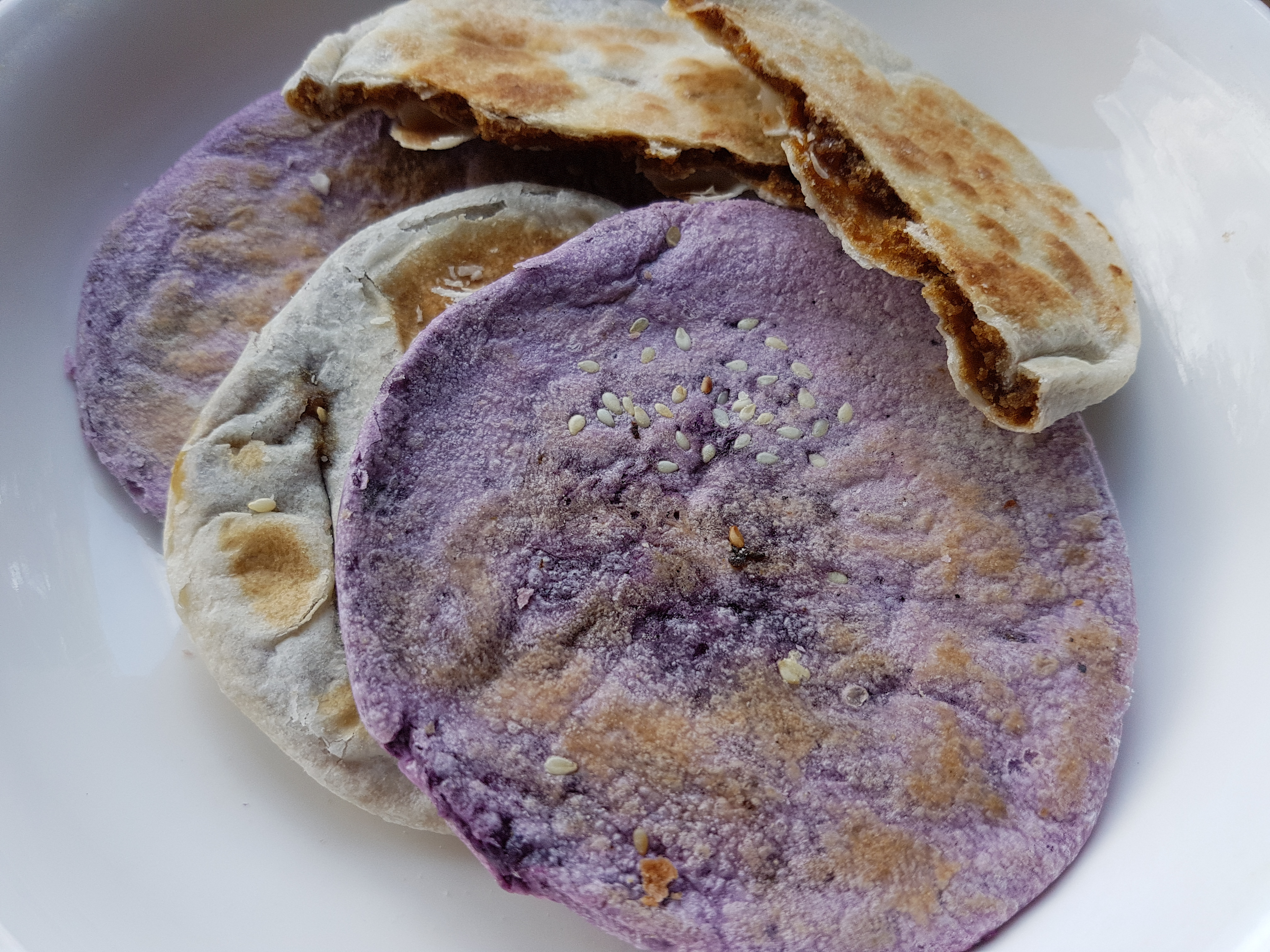
Ube and muscovado piayas from the Philippines

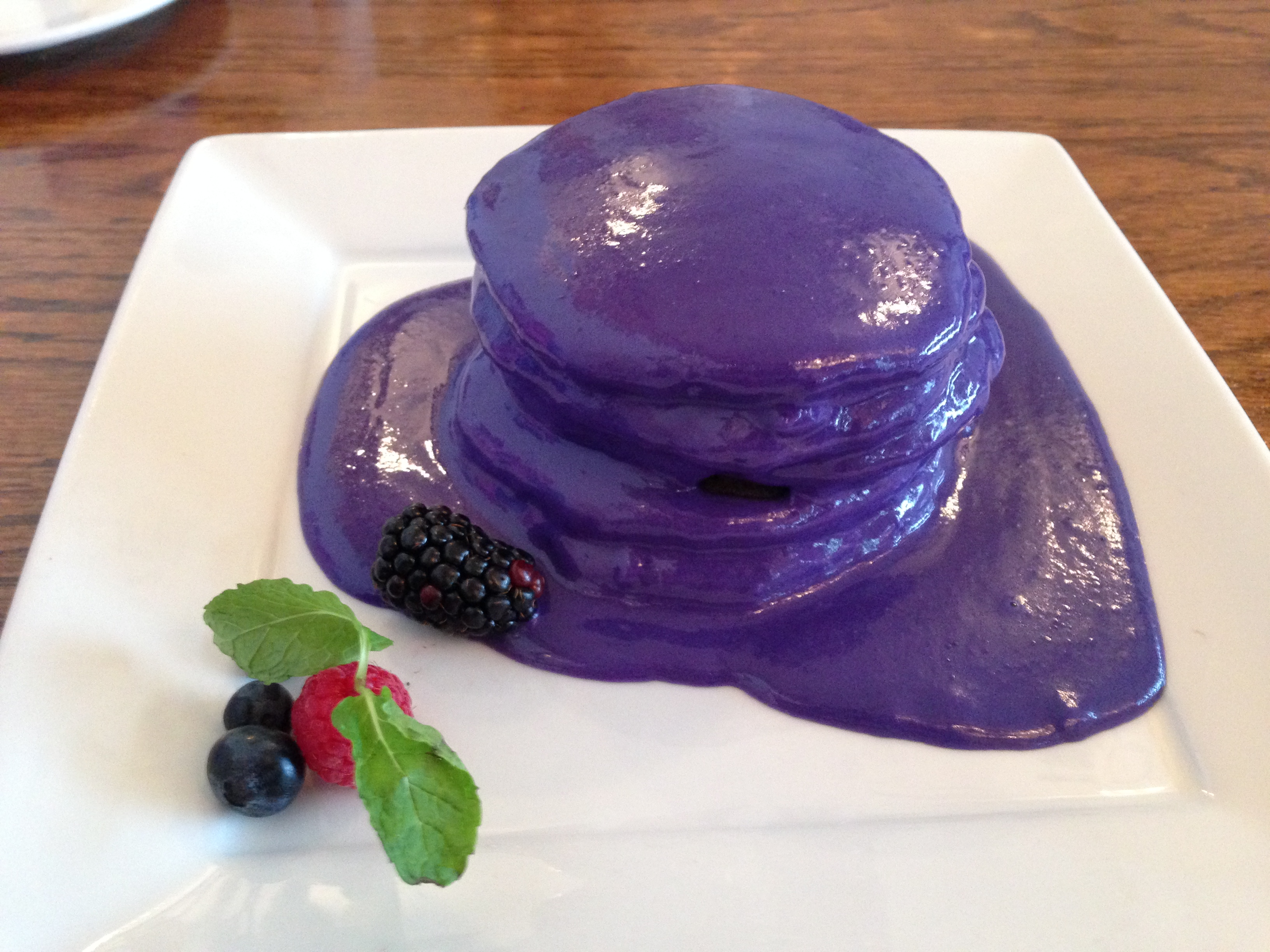
Okinawan sweet potato pancakes with coconut ube sauce

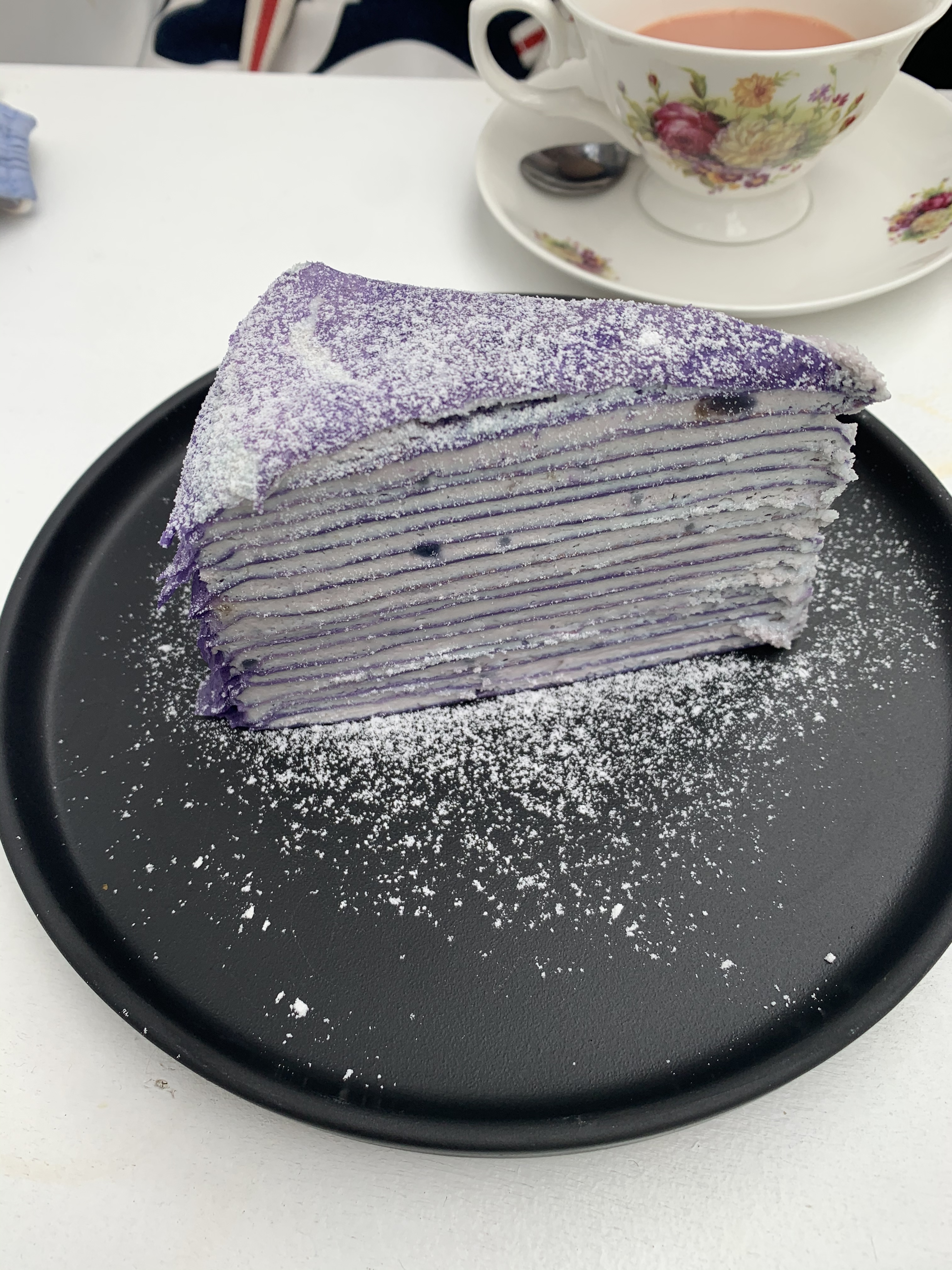
A slice of ube crepe cake

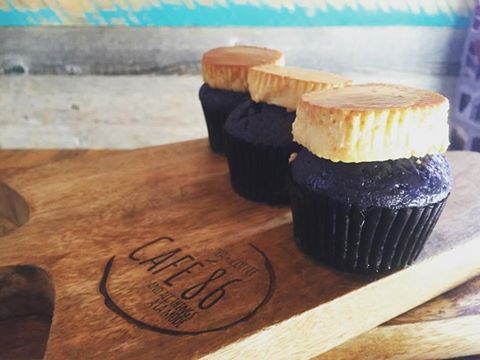
Purple yam cupcakes with flan top layers

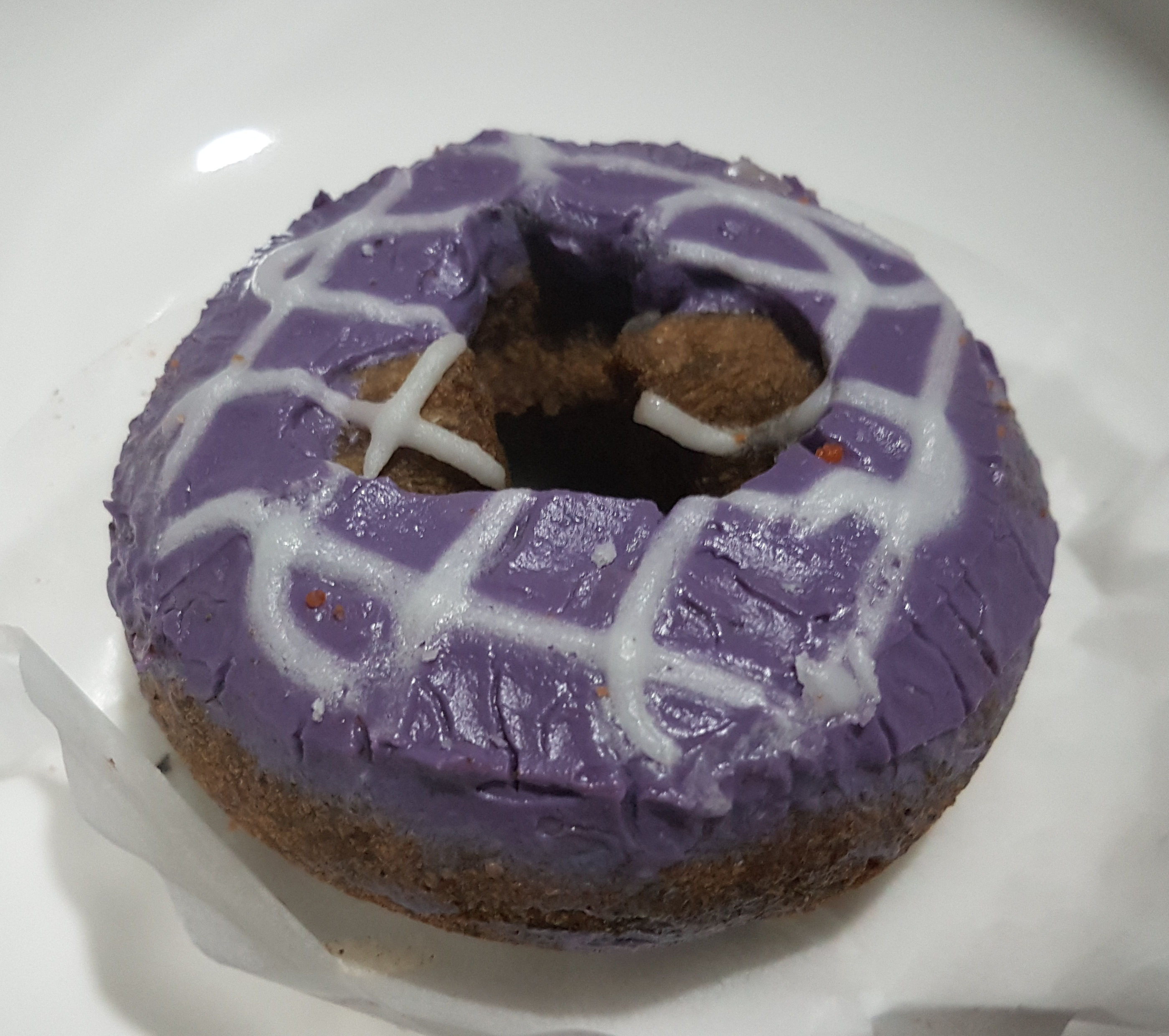
Filipino ube donut

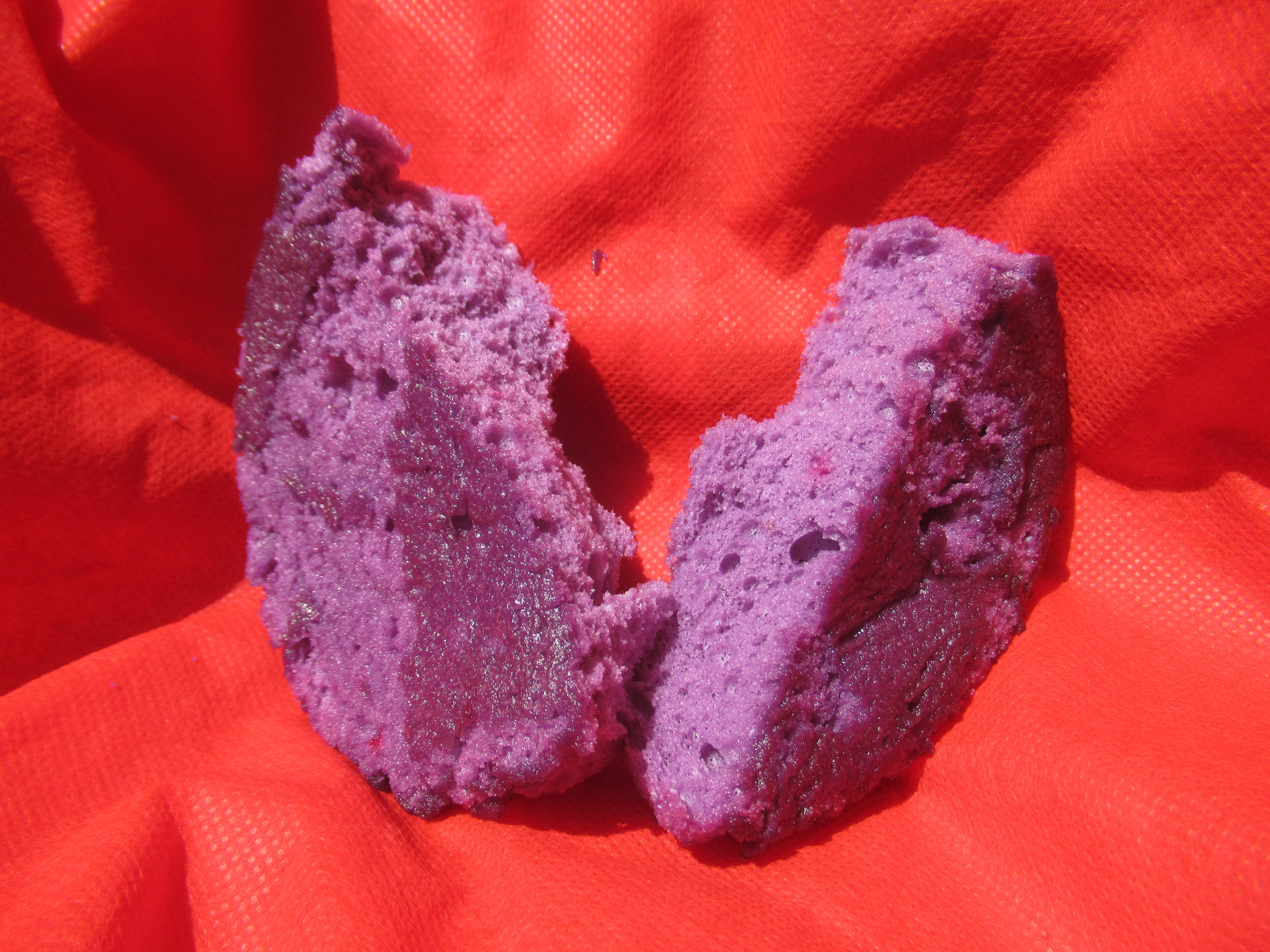
Ube Mamón

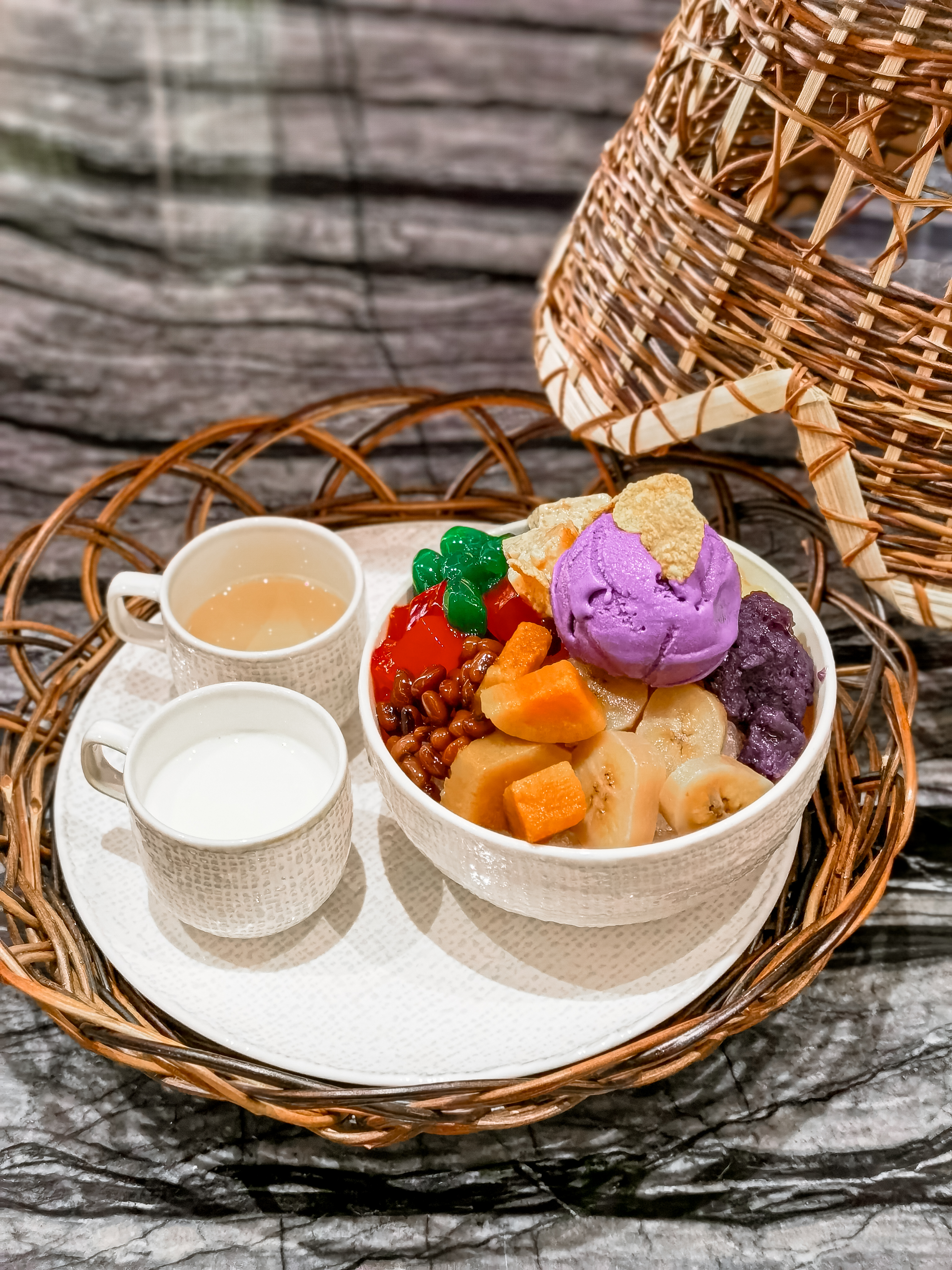
Halo-halo with ube halaya

Mashed purple yams from Kerala

=== Supplements, folk medicine, and adverse effects ===
Although available as a dietary supplement and used in folk medicine, no clinical evidence shows that D. alata has any therapeutic properties. Potential side effects and drug interactions also have not been researched adequately, so caution is advised.

D. alata has relatively high levels of oxalates (486–781 mg/100 g dry matter), which are associated with antinutritional effects and kidney stone formation.

=== Other uses ===
The color of purple varieties is due to various anthocyanin pigments. The pigments are water-soluble, and have been proposed as possible food coloring agents. D. alata is sometimes grown in gardens for its ornamental value.

== As an invasive species ==
D. alata is native to the Philippines and surrounding areas (Taiwan and the Ryukyu Islands of Japan). It has escaped from its native growth area and into the wild in many other places, becoming naturalized in parts of southern and east-central China, Africa and Madagascar, and various islands in the Indian and Pacific Oceans. It persists in the wild in Haiti, as well as the United States, in Hawaii, Louisiana, Georgia, Alabama, Puerto Rico, the U.S. Virgin Islands, and Florida, where it is considered an invasive species.

In Florida, it can be distinguished from the related D. bulbifera by noticing the contrasting habit of twisting clockwise, unlike D. bulbifera's habit of twisting counterclockwise.

== Gallery ==
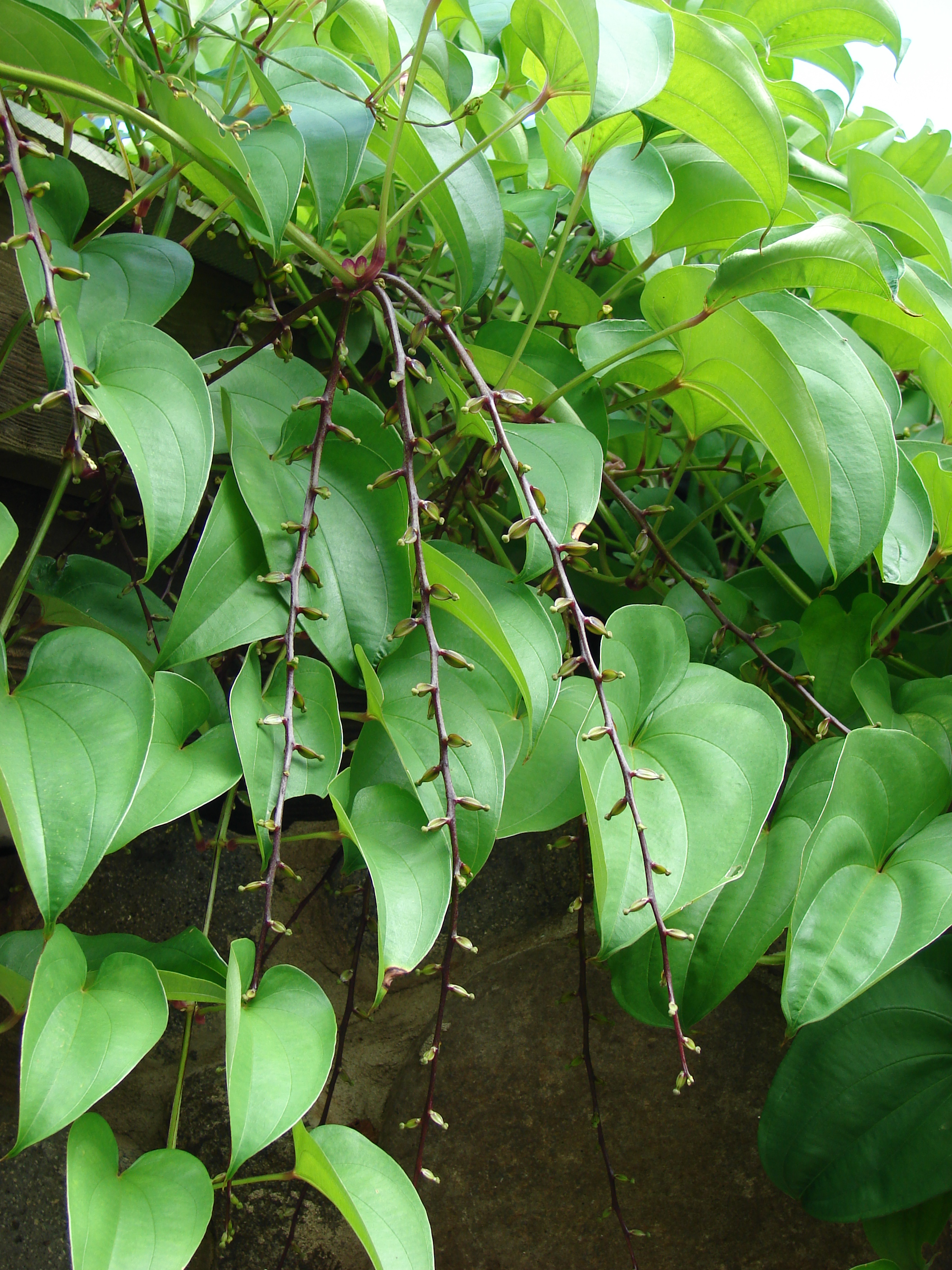
Purple yam leaves

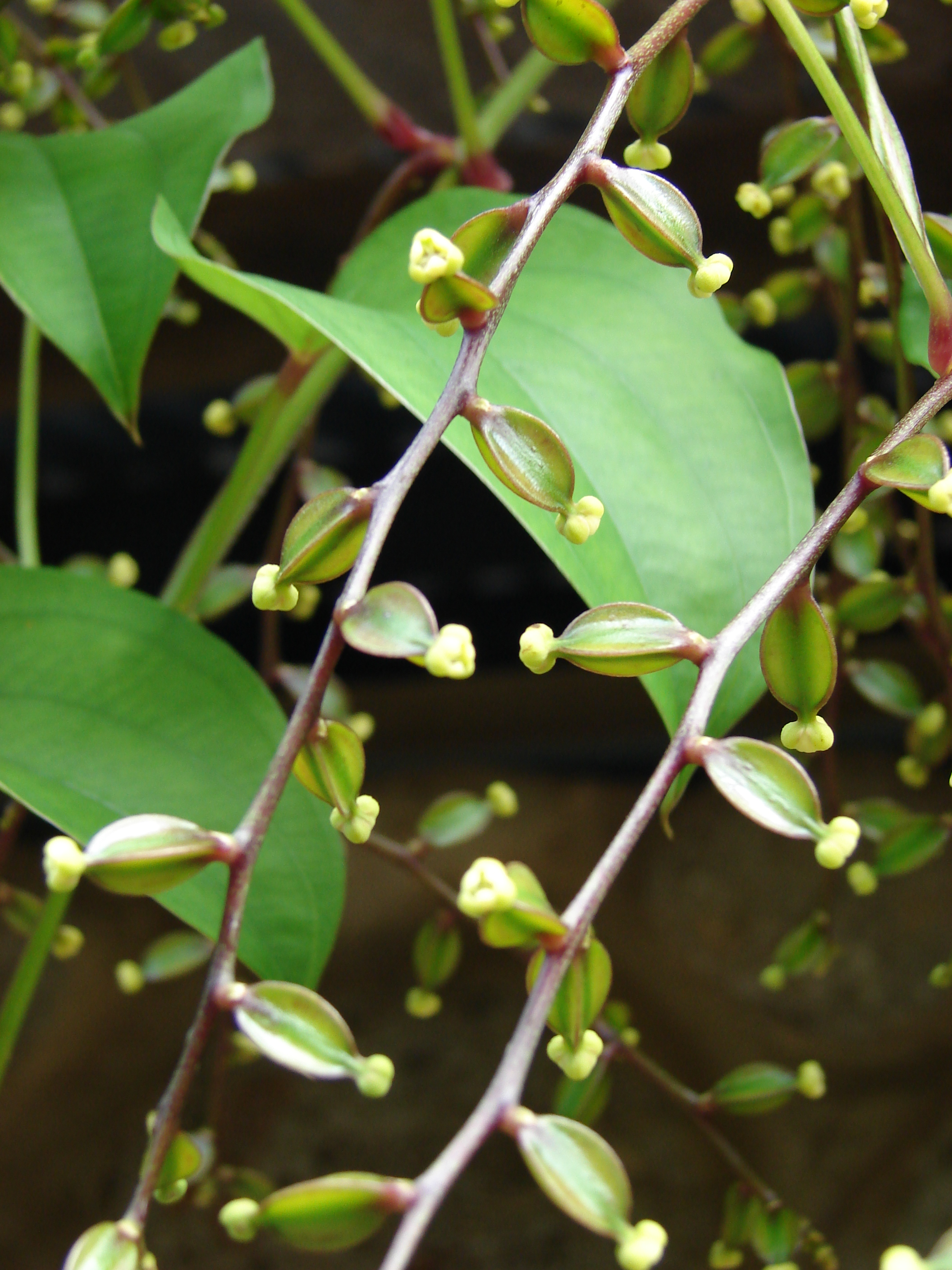
Purple yam flowers

== See also ==
- Domesticated plants and animals of Austronesia
- Colocasia esculenta
- Alocasia macrorrhizos
- Amorphophallus paeoniifolius
- Cyrtosperma merkusii
