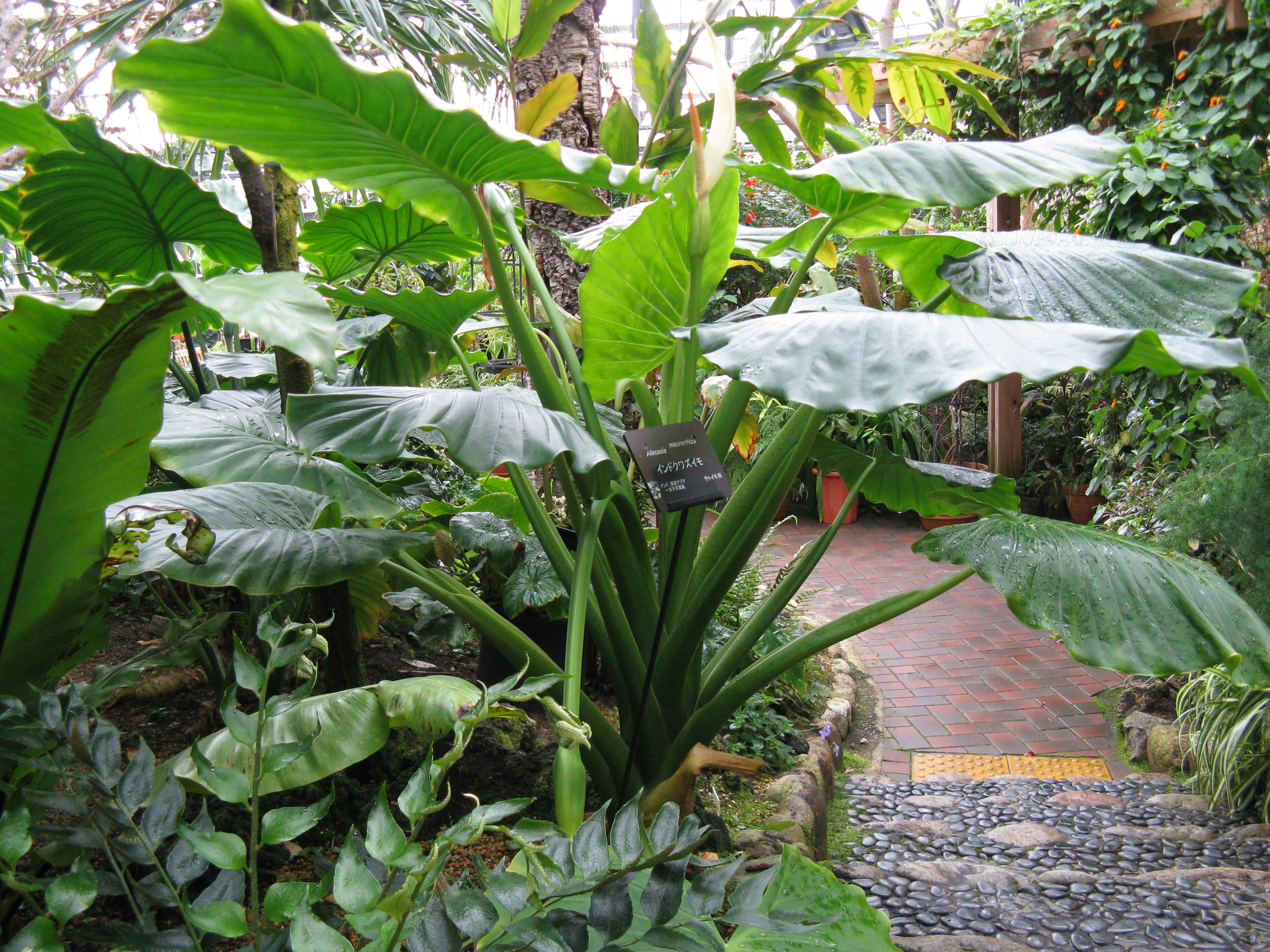
- Leaves
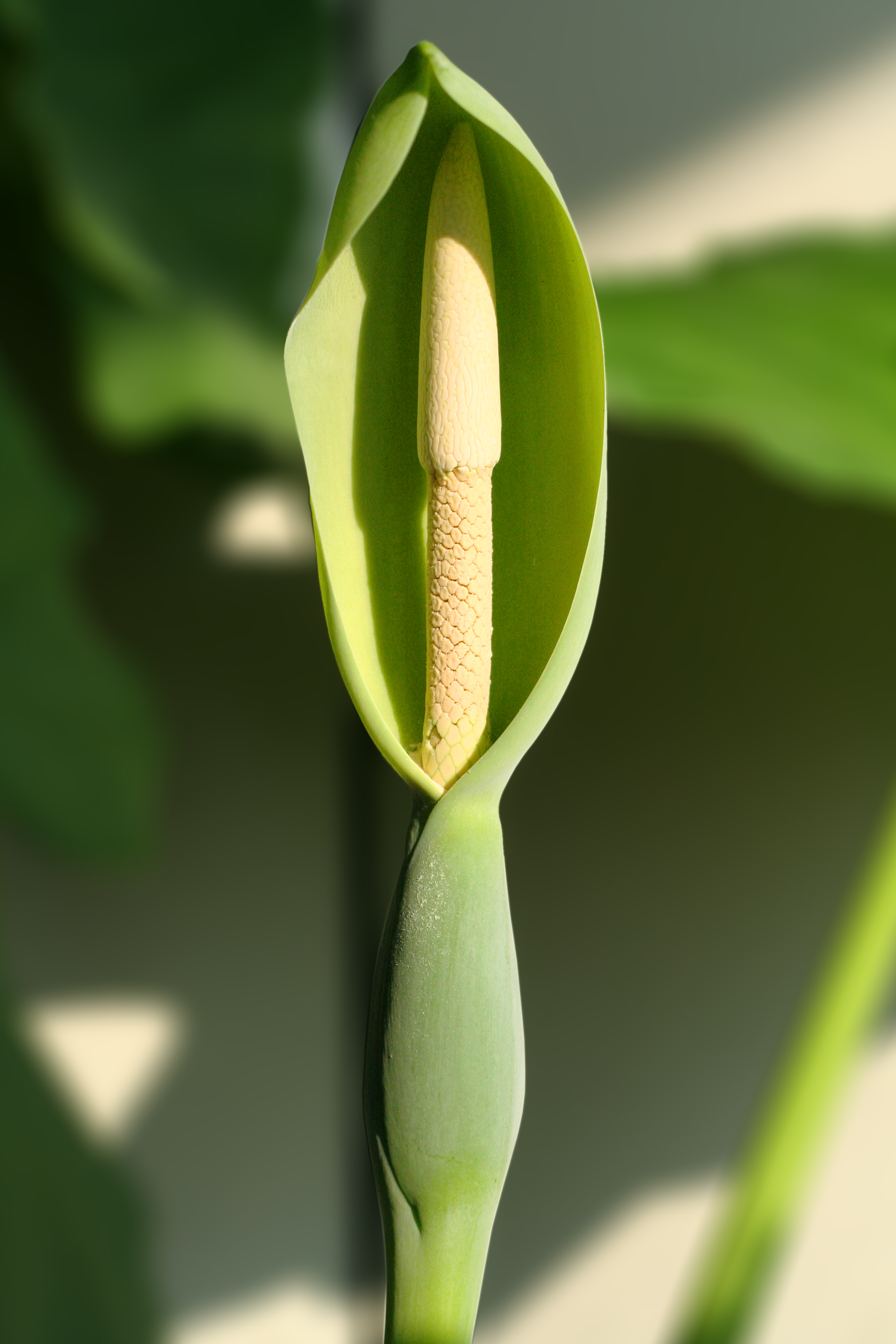
- Inflorescence

Scientific classification
- Kingdom: Plantae
- Clade: Embryophytes
- Clade: Tracheophytes
- Clade: Spermatophytes
- Clade: Angiosperms
- Clade: Monocots
- Order: Alismatales
- Family: Araceae
- Genus: Alocasia
- Species: A. macrorrhizos

Binomial name
- Alocasia macrorrhizos (L.) G.Don

Synonyms
- 28 synonyms: Arum macrorrhizon L.; Caladium macrorrhizon (L.) R.Br.; Colocasia macrorrhizos (L.) Schott; Alocasia cordifolia (Bory) Cordem.; Alocasia gigas Chantrier ex André; Alocasia grandis N.E.Br.; Alocasia harrisii-pulchrum Pynaert; Alocasia insignis Pynaert; Alocasia marginata N.E.Br.; Alocasia pallida K.Koch & C.D.Bouché; Alocasia plumbea Van Houtte; Alocasia rapiformis (Roxb.) Schott; Alocasia uhinkii Engl. & K.Krause; Arum cordifolium Bory; Arum mucronatum Lam.; Arum peregrinum L.; Arum rapiforme Roxb.; Caladium indicum K.Koch; Caladium metallicum Engl.; Caladium plumbeum K.Koch; Calla badian Blanco; Calla maxima Blanco; Colocasia boryi Kunth; Colocasia mucronata (Lam.) Kunth; Colocasia peregrina (L.) Raf.; Colocasia rapiformis (Roxb.) Kunth; Philodendron peregrinum (L.) Kunth; Philodendron punctatum Kunth

= Alocasia macrorrhizos =

Species of flowering plant

Alocasia macrorrhizos is a species of flowering plant in the arum family (Araceae) that is native to rainforests of Maritime Southeast Asia, New Guinea, and the Murray Islands group in the Torres Strait of Australia. It has long been cultivated in South Asia, the Philippines, many Pacific islands, and elsewhere in the tropics, in the order of tens of thousands of years. Common names include giant taro, giant alocasia, ʻape, biga, and pia. In Australia it is known as the cunjevoi (a term which also refers to a marine animal).

== History ==
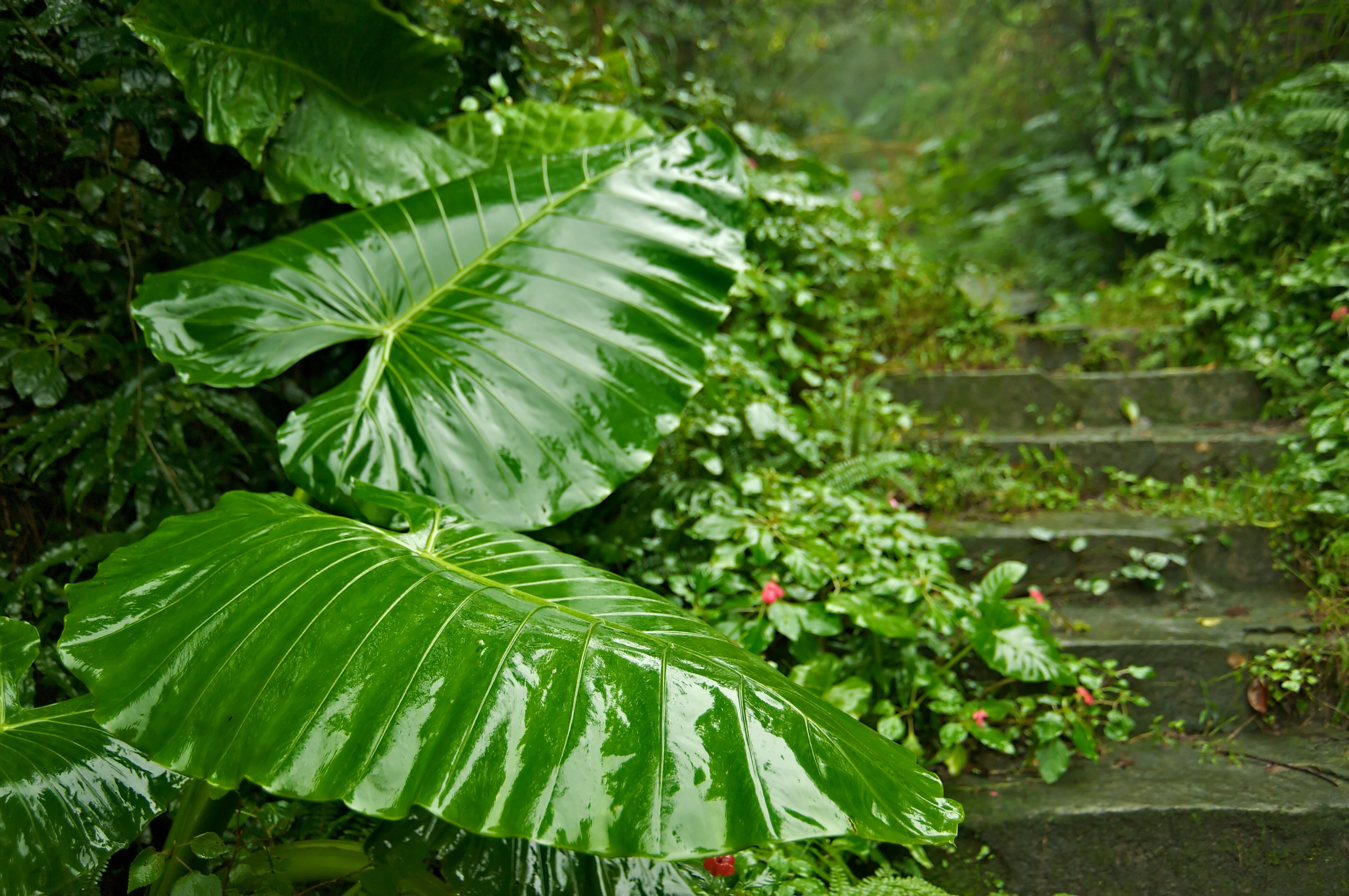
Giant taro in Jinguashi, Taiwan

Giant taro in southern Brazil

The giant taro was originally domesticated in the Philippines, but are known from wild specimens to early Austronesians in Taiwan. From the Philippines, they spread outwards to the rest of Maritime Southeast Asia and eastward to Oceania where it became one of the staple crops of Pacific Islanders. They are one of the four main species of aroids (taros) cultivated by Austronesians primarily as a source of starch, the others being Amorphophallus paeoniifolius, Colocasia esculenta, and Cyrtosperma merkusii, each with multiple cultivated varieties. Their leaves and stems are also edible if cooked thoroughly, though this is rarely done for giant taro as it contains higher amounts of raphides which cause itching.

The reconstructed word for giant taro in Proto-Austronesian is *biRaq, which became Proto-Oceanic *piRaq. Modern cognates in Maritime Southeast Asia and Micronesia include Rukai vi'a or bi'a; Ifugao bila; Ilocano, Cebuano, and Bikol biga; Tiruray bira; Ngaju biha; Malagasy via; Malay and Acehnese birah; Mongondow biga; Palauan bísə; Chamorro piga; Bima wia; Roti and Tetun fia; Asilulu hila; and Kowiai fira. In Oceania, cognates for it include Wuvulu and Aua pia; Motu and ꞋAreꞌare hira; Kilivila and Fijian via; and Hawaiian pia. Note that in some cases, the cognates have shifted to mean other types of taro.

== Uses ==
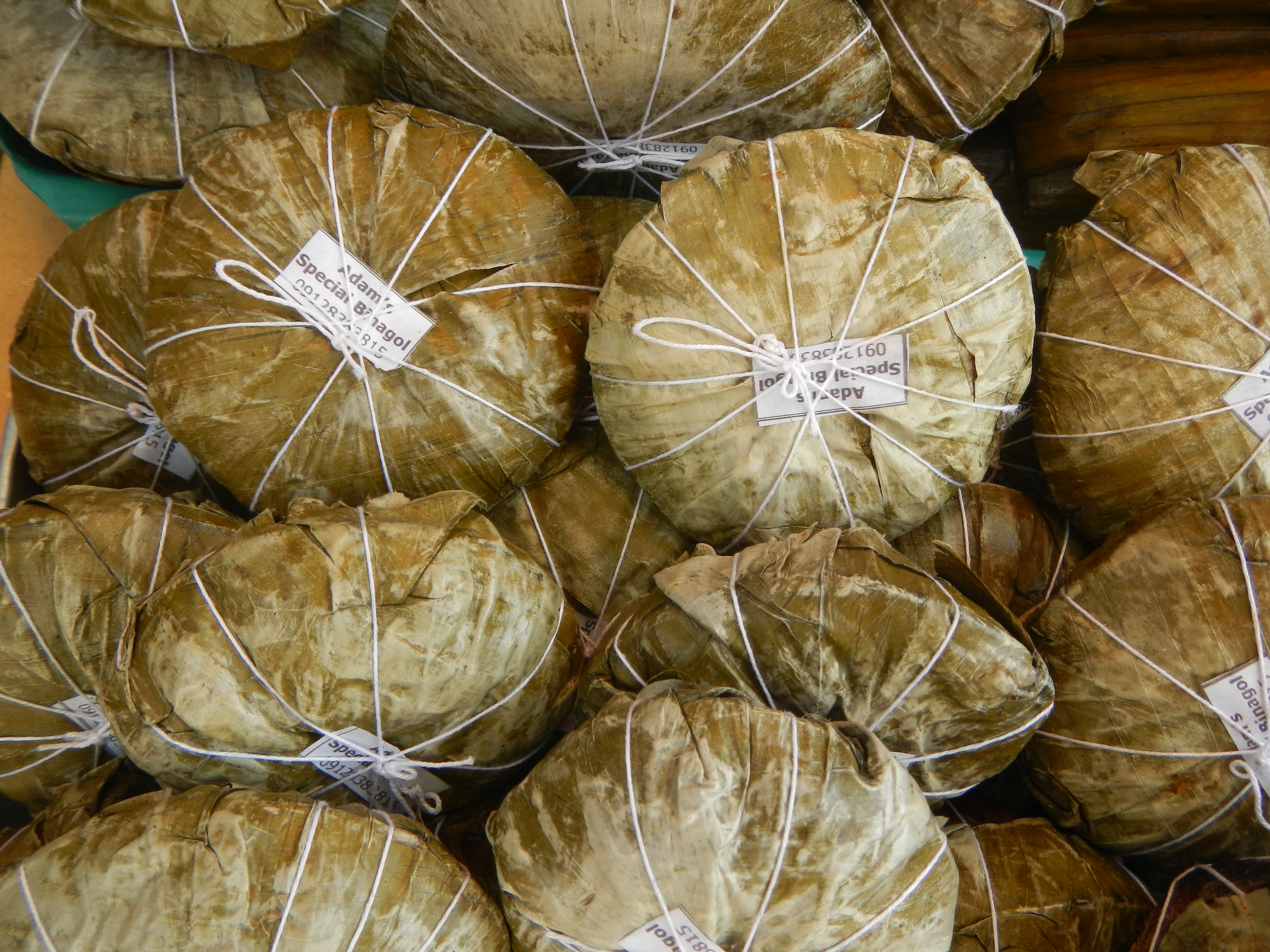
Binagol, a Filipino sweet delicacy made from mashed giant taro corms and coconut milk

Usually the starch-containing rhizome and above-ground stem of the plant are collected and used for food. The leaf and leaf stem are also edible. Since the plant's sap can irritate all parts of the body that came in contact with it, due to presence of needle-like crystals of calcium oxalate (known as raphides), they have to be thoroughly cooked to avoid adverse effects. Plants harvested later will have more raphides. Alocasia species are commonly found in marketplaces in Samoa and Tonga and other parts of Polynesia. The varieties recognized in Tahiti are the Ape oa, haparu, maota, and uahea. The Hawaiian saying: ʻAi no i ka ʻape he maneʻo no ka nuku (The eater of ʻape will have an itchy mouth) means "there will be consequences for partaking of something bad".

The giant heart-shaped leaves make impromptu umbrellas in tropical downpours.

== Distribution ==
Alocasia macrorrhizos is native to an area from Borneo in the west to the Solomon Islands in the east, including Sulawesi, the Philippines, the Maluku Islands, New Guinea, the Bismarck Archipelago and Queensland.

== See also ==
- Domesticated plants and animals of Austronesia
