= Rice cake =

Food item made from rice

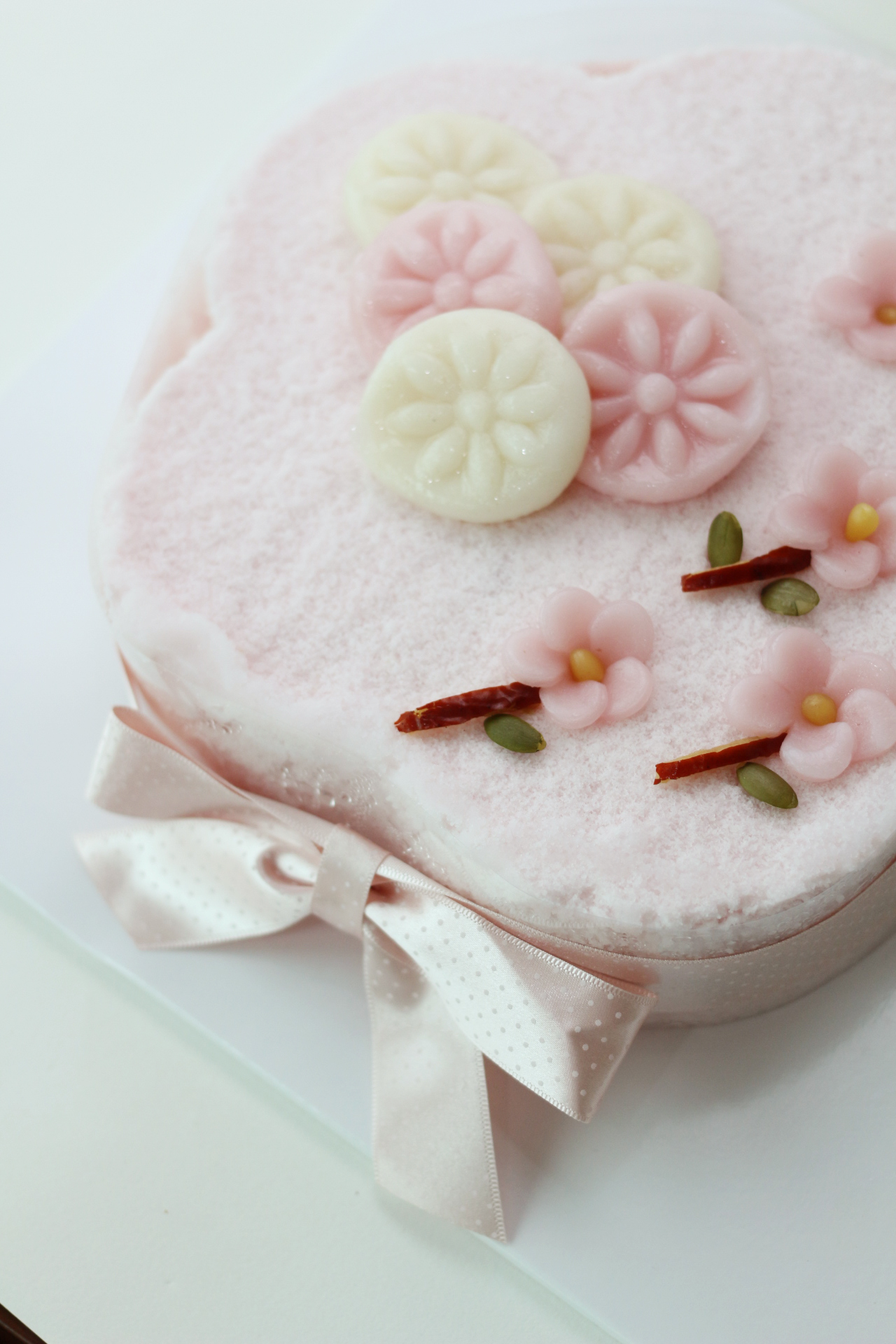
A birthday cake of tteok (Korean rice cake)

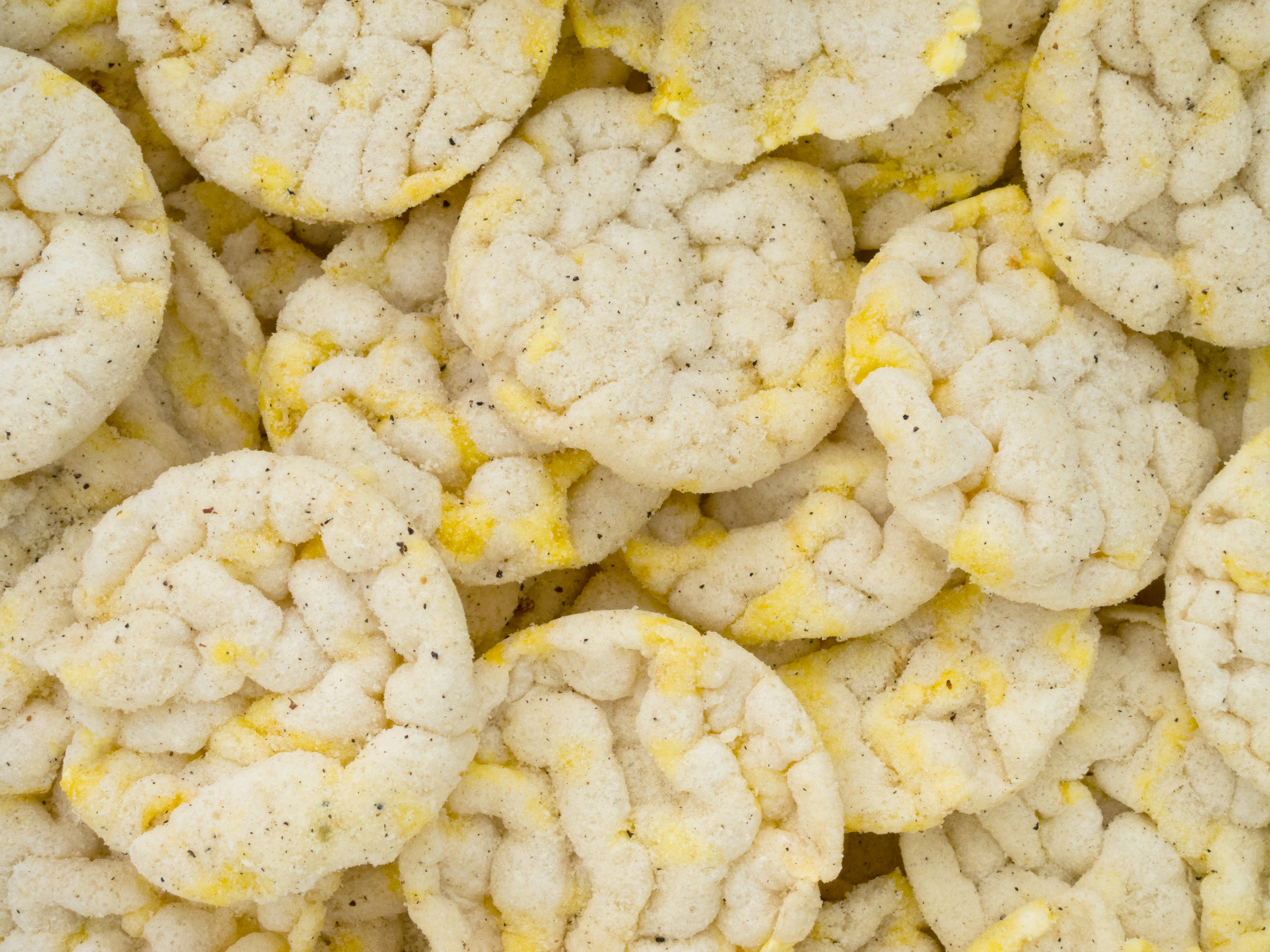
Puffed rice cakes, sold commercially in North America and Europe

A rice cake may be any kind of food item made from rice that has been shaped, condensed, or otherwise combined into a single object. A wide variety of rice cakes exist in many different cultures in which rice is eaten. Common variations include cakes made with rice flour, those made from ground rice, and those made from whole grains of rice compressed together or combined with some other binding substance.

== Types of rice cakes by region ==
Types of rice cake include:

=== Burmese ===
Burmese cuisine has a variety of snacks and desserts called mont made with various types of rice, rice flour and glutinous rice flour. Sweet Burmese mont are generally less sweet than counterparts in other parts of Southeast Asia, instead deriving their natural sweetness from constituent ingredients (e.g., grated coconut, coconut milk, glutinous rice, fruit, etc.).

=== Cambodian ===
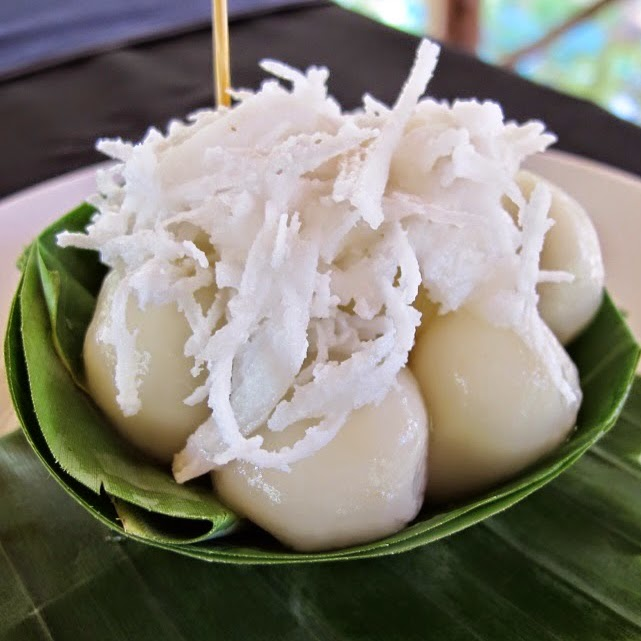
Num Plae Ai (ផ្លែអាយ) Khmer sticky rice balls with coconut topping

- Ansom chek is a banana leaf sticky rice cake. It is served all year long but it is most prevalent during Bun Pchum Ben or "Ancestors' Day" festival. It is served either with a banana filling or pork fat strips and beans then they are wrapped with layers of banana leaf and steamed.
- Num kom is steamed sweet sticky rice flour cake filled with palm sugar, freshly grated coconut and roasted sesame seeds. It is traditionally made and eaten on Memorial day for ancestors (Bun Pchum ben/Don-ta), Visak (Buddha birthday) and especially Cambodian New Year (Bon chol thnam tmey). It takes the shape of a pyramid to represent Buddhist pagoda towers.
- Num Krok is sticky rice cake that is mixture of rice flour, coconut milk, chopped shallots and a little salt, dipped in fish and chili sauce and sometimes palm sugar. It is made with an iron pan.
- Num plae ai (ផ្លែអាយ) is sticky rice balls with palm sugar on the inside and rolled in fresh coconut for a beautiful cover.
- Num akor (នំអាកោរ) is one of the most popular Cambodian/Khmer dessert. It is a dessert that is served during Khmer New Year and festivities. It is made with rice flour and topped with fresh shaved coconut. It comes in many colors.
- Nom Chak-Kachan also known as sticky rice layer cake. It is made with sticky rice, tapioca flours, and coconut milk. It comes in a number of colors with green and yellow layers being the most popular.

=== Chinese ===
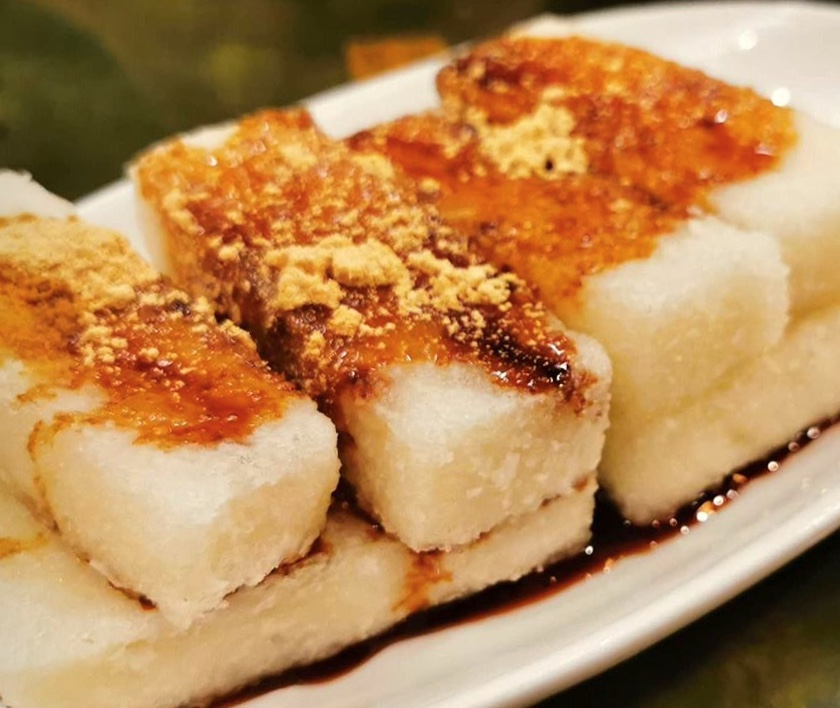
Ciba cake with Brown Sugar and roasted soybean flour

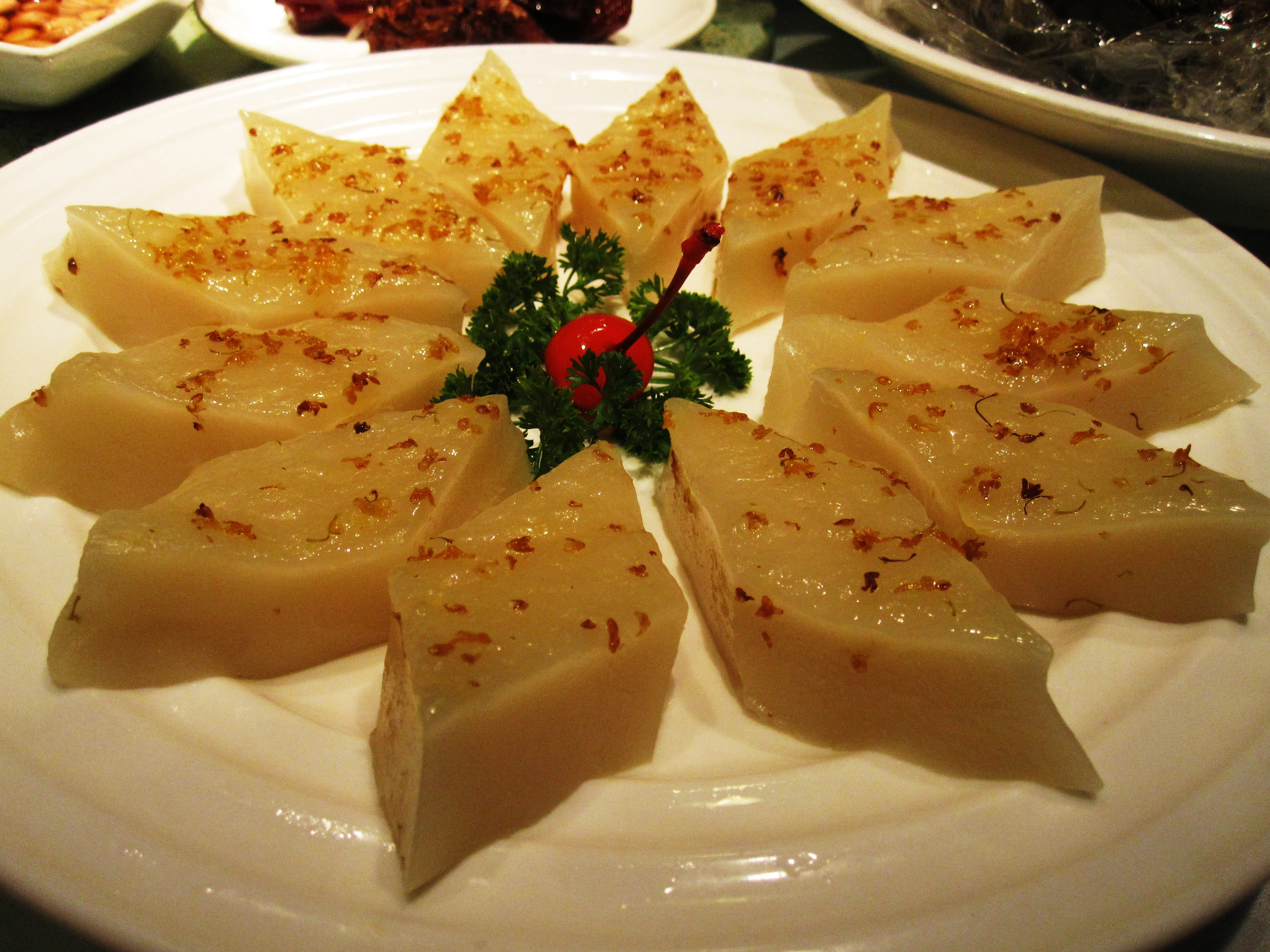
Osmanthus cake

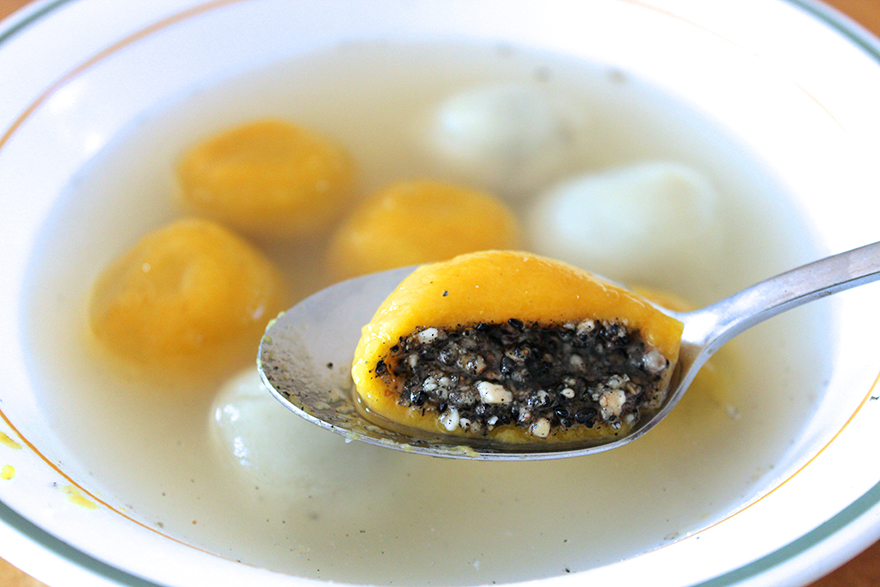
Pumpkin Tangyuan with red bean paste and black sesame fillings

- Chongyang cake is a steamed rice flour cake, with bean or bean paste as inner layer, decorated with jujube, chestnuts, almonds, and osmanthus. It is specially made for Chongyang Festival.
- Ciba cake is made by glutinous rice pounded into paste, often molded into shapes of balls or cuboids, and usually dipped into brown sugar syrup and roasted soybean flour after being fried or steamed.
- Erkuai (lit. 'ear piece'), a reference to the shape of one of its common forms. Erkuai is generally stir-fried or grilled and rolled around a youtiao. It's a popular food in Yunnan Province.
- Fa gao is a steamed cupcake-like pastry, most commonly consumed on the Chinese new year. It is made of rice flour, leavening (traditionally yeast), sugar.
- Jian dui (aka Ma tuan, or Sesame Ball) are a type of crisp and chewy hollow glutinous rice pastry often filled with red bean and coated with sesame on the outside
- Funing big cake is made with glutinous rice flour and various nuts as garnishes. It is molded into cuboid shape, steamed, and then sliced to paper-like pieces.
- Lüdagun (aka Donkey Roll) is a traditional Manchu snack in China. It is a round sticky rice pastry with honey and red bean paste filling, rolled with yellow soybean flour dusted over.
- Nuomici is glutinous rice ball, filled with a sweet filling with dried coconut flakes dusted on the outside.
- Mi gao (米糕, rice cake), Nuo mi gao (糯米糕, glutinous rice cake), or Jiang mi gao (江米糕, river rice cake), is a cake that directly made with glutinous rice, added dates or longan pulp or red bean, steamed thoroughly, and cut to pieces or blocks.
  - Zèng gao (甑糕, cauldron cake), called as Jing gao in Shaanxi dialect, is a rice cake steamed originally with an ancient Chinese food vessel Zèng (甑), and now people use steamer to cook it. It is layered repeatedly with glutinous rice, red bean, glutinous rice, dates and raisin. It is similar to Mi gao, however originate from different regions and cooked by different cookware.
- Nian gao includes many varieties, all made from glutinous rice that is pounded or ground into a paste and, depending on the variety, may simply be molded into shape or cooked again to settle the ingredient.
- Osmanthus cake is a traditional sweet-scented Chinese pastry made with glutinous rice flour, honey sweet-scented osmanthus and rock sugar.
- Qingtuan is made of glutinous rice mixed with Chinese mugwort or barley grass juice, resulting in green colour, usually filled with sweet red or black bean paste. It is a seasonal snack, and especially made for the Qingming Festival.
- Song gao is a Shanghai snack composed of rice flour, sugar, and water, with azuki beans embedded throughout the cake.
- Tangyuan is made by mixing glutinous rice flour with a small amount of water to form balls and is then cooked and served in boiling water.
- White sugar sponge cake is a steamed rice cake that is typically consumed in square pieces or triangle with some ropes attached to it.

=== Filipino ===
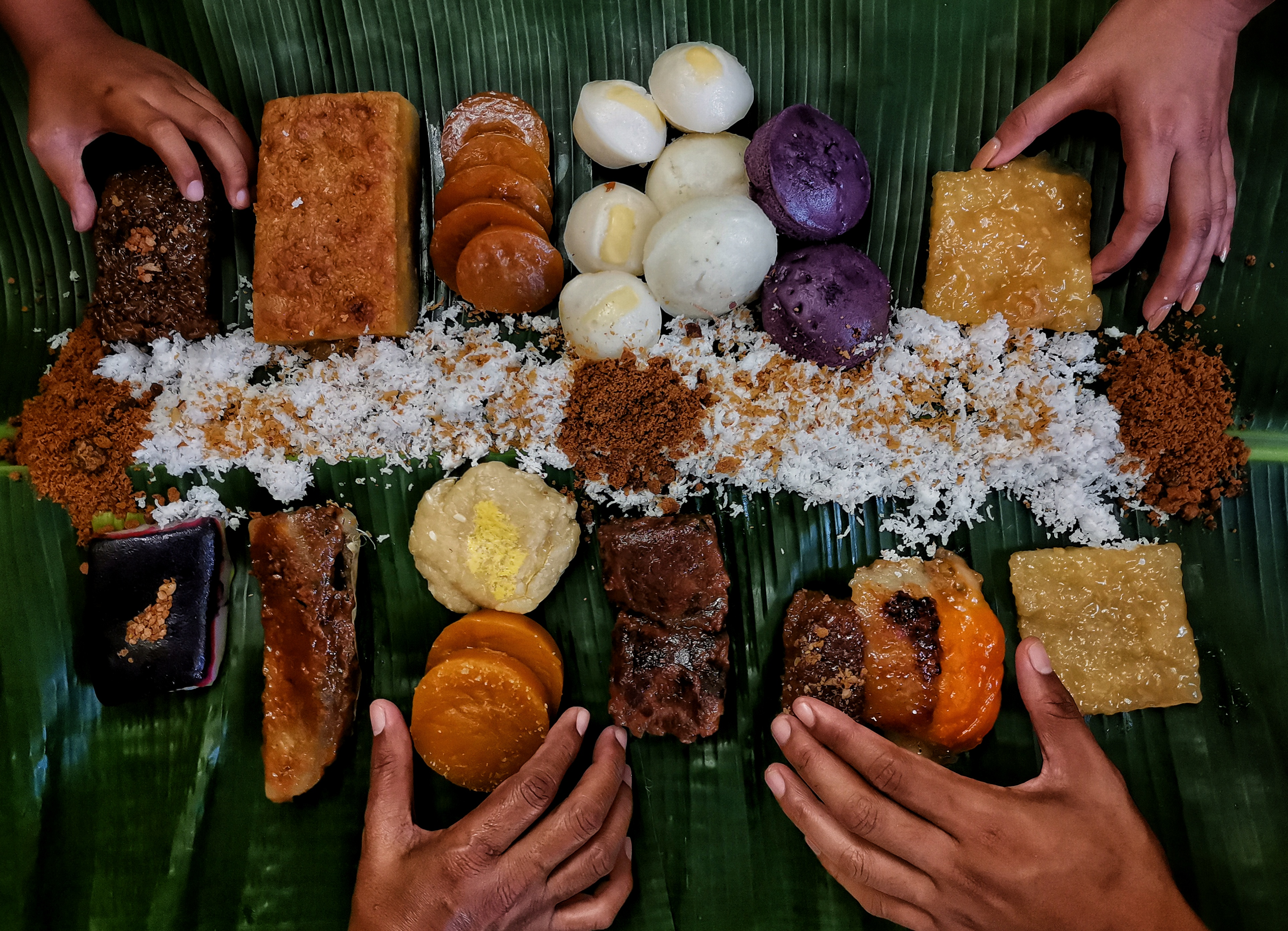
Various traditional Filipino kakanin (rice cakes)

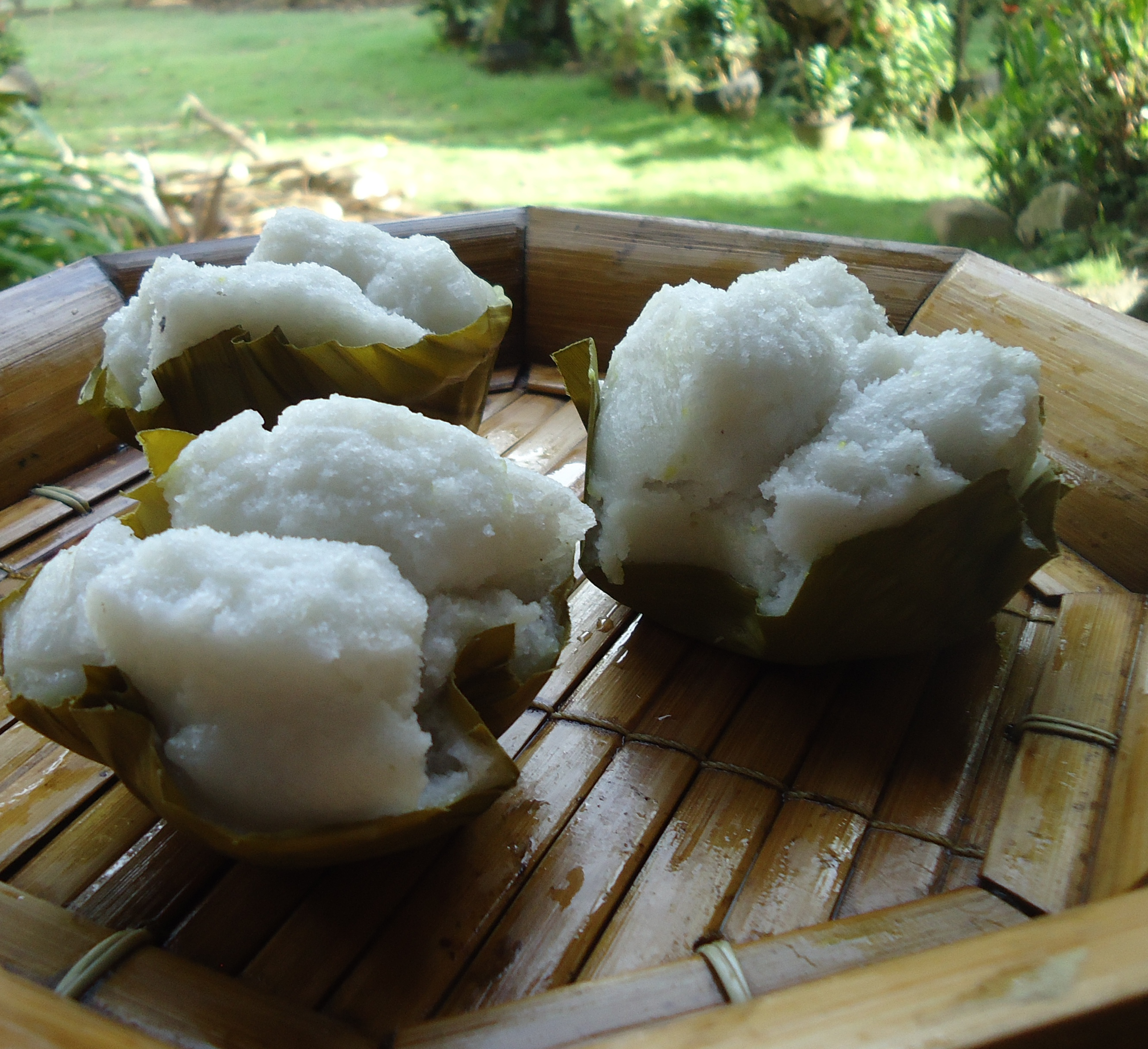
Puto, a traditional Filipino steamed rice cake

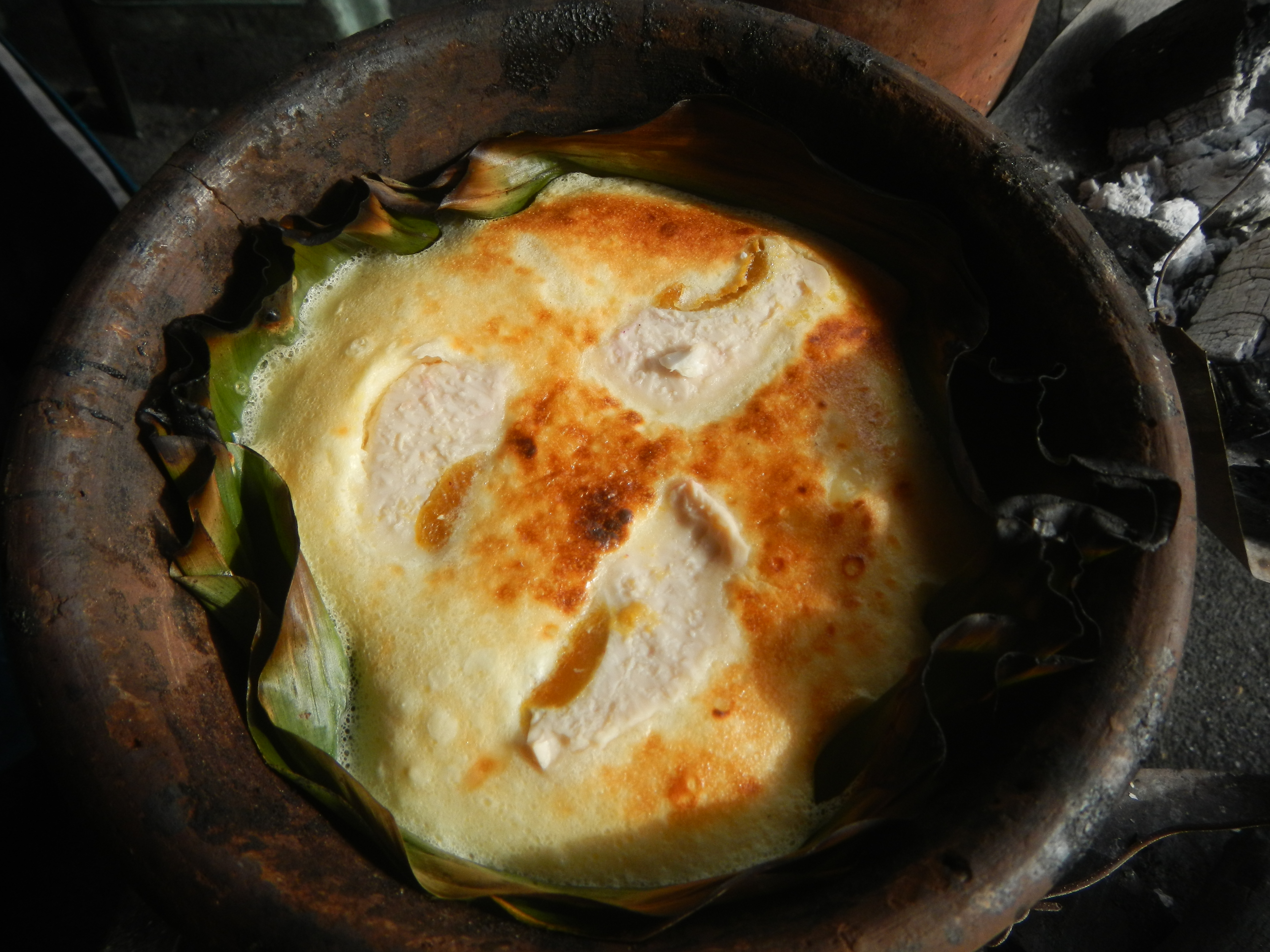
Bibingka, a traditional Filipino rice cake baked in a clay pot

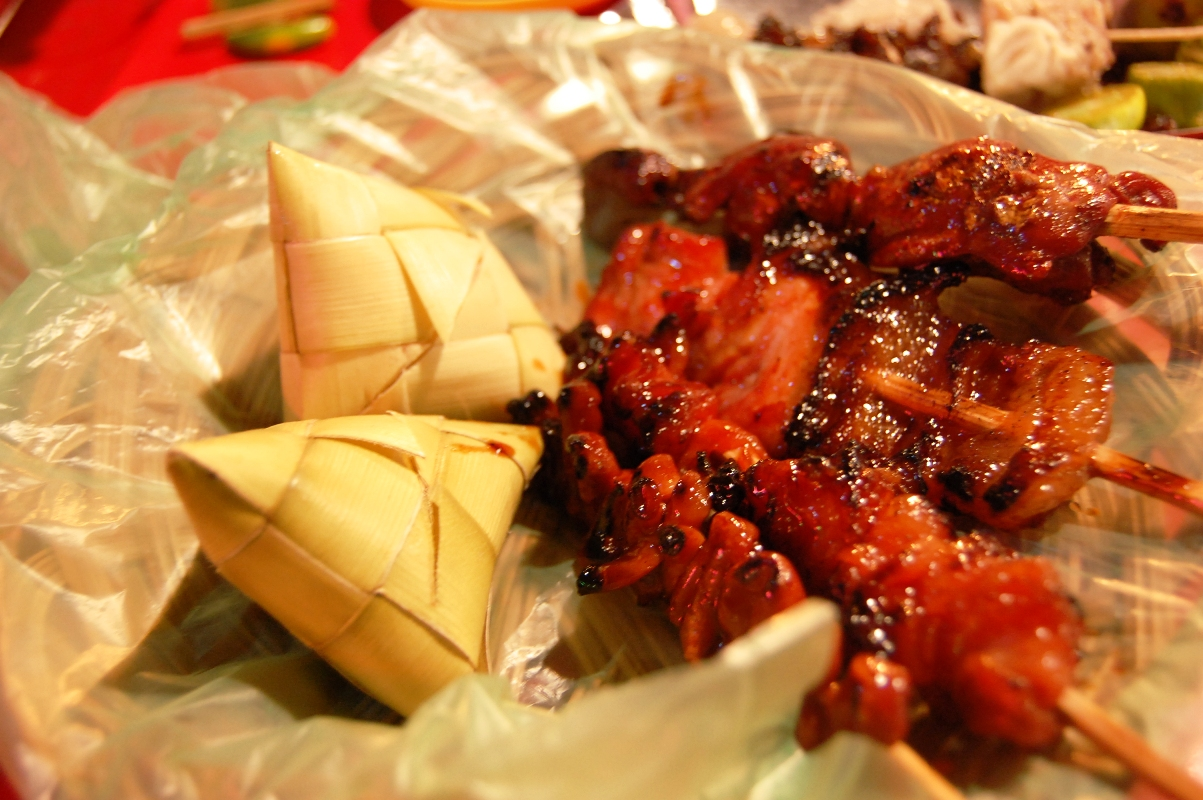
Filipino puso rice cakes, made from glutinous rice cooked in woven pouches of various designs, are eaten with savory dishes

Rice cakes are a common snack in the Philippines and Filipinos have created many different kinds. In Filipino, these rice-based desserts are also known as kakanin, which means "prepared rice." It is derived from the word kanin which is the Filipino word for rice. Rice cakes were also formerly known by the general term tinapay (lit. 'fermented with tapay'), but that term is now restricted to mean "bread" in modern Filipino. Nevertheless, two general categories of rice cakes remain: puto for steamed rice cakes, and bibingka for baked rice cakes. Both are usually prepared using galapong, a viscous rice paste derived from grinding uncooked glutinous rice that has been soaked overnight. Galapong is usually fermented, as the old term tinapay implies.

Some examples of traditional Filipino dessert rice cakes include:

- Ampaw is a Filipino sweet puffed rice cake. It is traditionally made with sun-dried leftover cooked white rice that is fried and coated with syrup.
- Baye baye is a type of rice cake made from coconut and ground green rice (pinipig) or ground corn kernels
- Bibingka is a type of rice cake made with galapong and coconut milk or water, with its bottom lined with banana leaves. It is traditionally baked using specially made clay ovens and preheated charcoal. Often topped with desiccated coconut, grated cheese, salted duck egg and muscovado sugar.
- Biko, also called sinukmani or wadjit, is a type of rice cake made from coconut milk, sugar, and whole glutinous rice grains
- Espasol is made from rice flour cooked in coconut milk and sweetened coconut strips, dusted with toasted rice flour
- Kutsinta is a steamed rice cake (puto) made with rice flour, brown sugar, lye, and freshly grated mature coconut meat
- Mache (also spelled matse) are boiled glutinous rice balls flavored with pandan and coconut
- Masi are boiled or steamed glutinous rice balls with a peanut and muscovado filling
- Moche (also spelled mochi or muchi) are boiled glutinous rice balls with bean paste fillings served with hot sweetened coconut milk
- Palitaw is a boiled rice cake disk covered with freshly grated mature coconut meat and sugar
- Panyalam is similar to bibingka but is fried instead of baked. It is popular among Muslim Filipinos and the Lumad people of Mindanao.
- Puto is a general term for steamed rice cakes popular all over the country with numerous variations
- Puto bumbong is a steamed rice cake (puto) cooked in bamboo tubes and characteristically deep purple in color
- Salukara is similar to bibingka but is cooked as a large flat pancake traditionally greased with pork lard
- Sapin-sapin is made from glutinous rice flour, coconut milk, sugar, water, and coconut flakes sprinkled on top. Its distinguishing layered appearance is achieved by using food coloring
- Suman is made from glutinous rice cooked in coconut milk, and often steamed in banana leaves
- Tupig, a rice cake made from galapong, coconut milk, sugar, and young coconut wrapped in banana leaves and baked directly on charcoals

Some of these rice cakes can be considered savory. Putong bigas, the most common type of puto, for instance, is traditionally paired with the savory pig's blood stew dinuguan. Bibingka galapong can also be topped with meat or eggs. Aside from these, non-dessert rice cakes eaten as accompaniment to savory meals also exist, the most widespread being the puso.

- Binalot is a generic term for rice with various accompanying dishes wrapped in banana leaves
- Kiping is a thin wafer-like rice cakes uniquely molded from real leaves. Usually eaten dipped with vinegar, but can be eaten as a dessert with sugar.
- Pastil is a packed rice dish with shredded beef, chicken, or fish wrapped in banana leaves
- Puso is a widespread class of rice cakes made from glutinous rice cooked inside woven pouches of various designs. These are differentiated from other non-dessert rice rice cakes wrapped in leaves, in that the leaves in puso are woven into complex designs, not simply wrapped around the rice cakes.

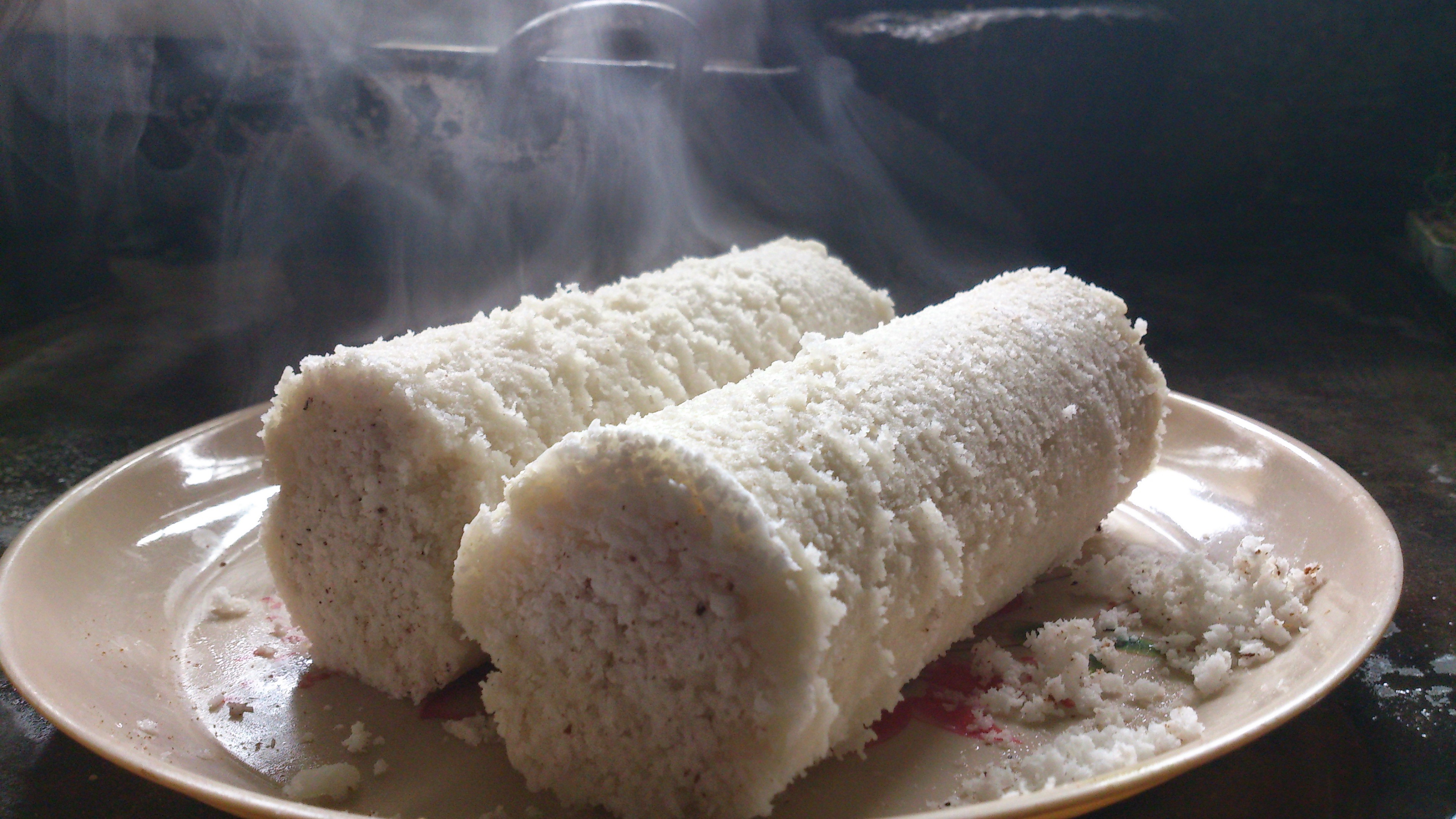
Puttu

=== Indian ===
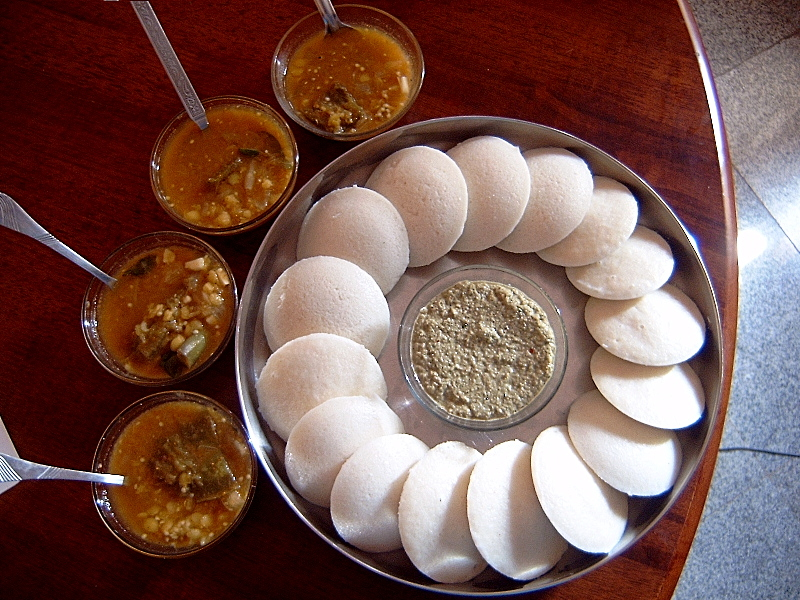
Idli, a south Indian savory cake

- Patoleo are sweet rice cakes steamed in turmeric leaves consisting of a filling of coconut and palm jaggery. These are prepared by the Konkani people during their festivities.
- Pitha, in the Bengali, Assamese, Bihari, and Oriya cuisines, is usually a thin-flat cake prepared from a batter made with soaked and ground rice. They are usually cooked on a hot griddle or frying pan and could be fried in oil, roasted over a slow fire or baked and rolled over a hot plate once made. In West Bengal and Bangladesh, special pithas are made in different processes such as steaming or stuffing, the bhapa and puli pithas being examples respectively. Special festivals where pithas are generally made include Nabanna in Bengali culture, Bihu in Assam and many festivals in East India.
- Idli in South Indian cuisine. The cakes are usually two to three inches in diameter and are made by steaming a batter, which is fermented overnight, consisting of black lentils (de-husked), and rice approximately 1:2 ratio with a bit of salt. Usually eaten with coconut chutney or sambar – a type of lentil soup flavoured with tamarind.
- Puttu in South Indian cuisine, consists of firm cylinders of steamed ground rice with layers of coconut.
- Vattayappam in Kerala cuisine are round cakes made with fermented rice batter, coconut milk, desiccated coconut, and jaggery (or cane sugar). Vattayappam are quite similar to Vietnamese Bánh bò in appearance and texture.
- Kozhukatta of Tamil cuisine are steamed rice dumplings or cakes that take a variety of forms - savoury and sweet. For example, "thengai poorana kozhukattai" are sticky rice balls stuffed with a filling of shredded coconut and palm sugar. They are similar to the Odia Manda pitha and Cambodian "Num Plae Ai."

=== Indonesian ===
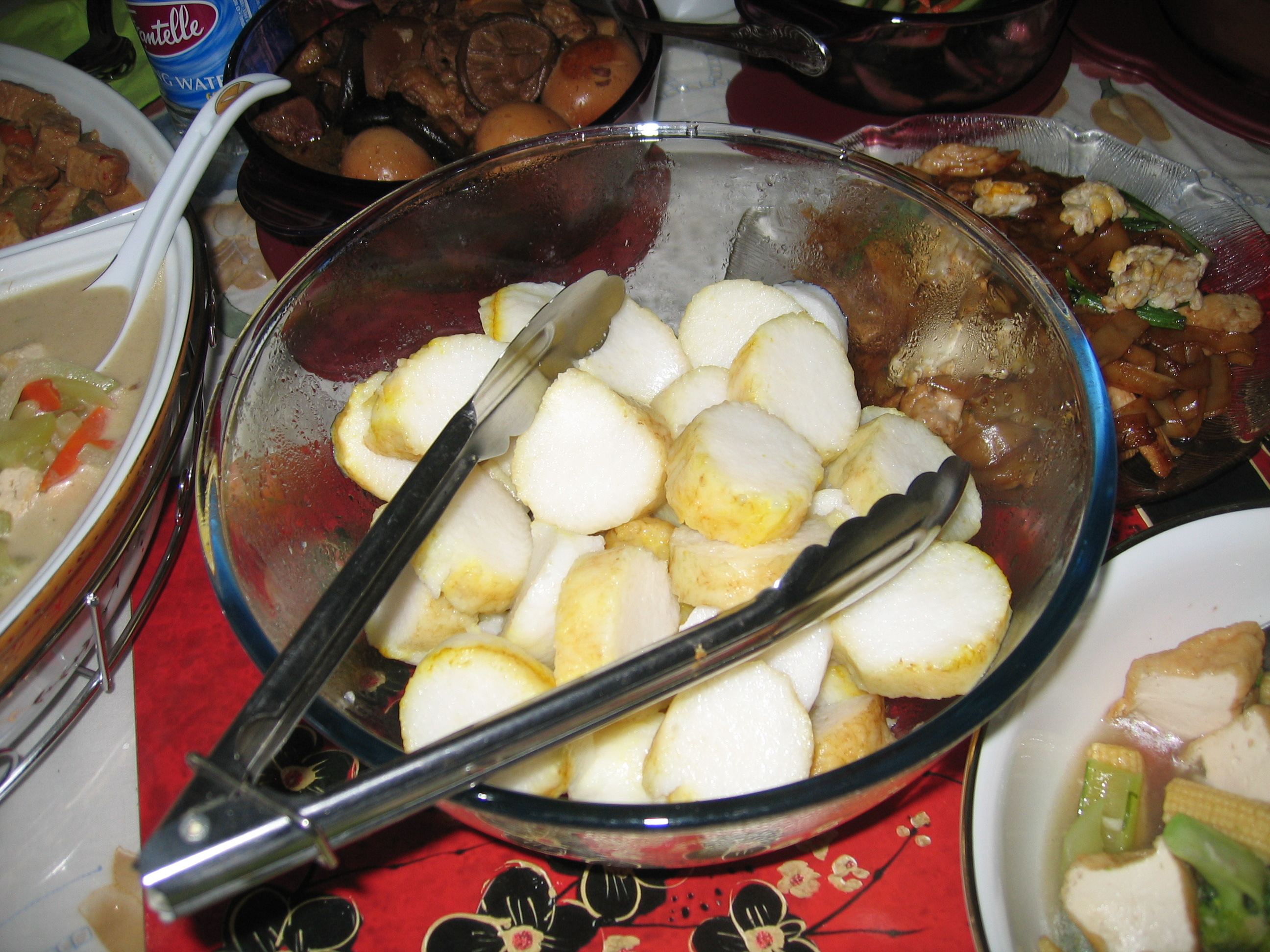
Lontong, popular in Indonesia and Malaysia, made of compressed rice rolled into a banana leaf

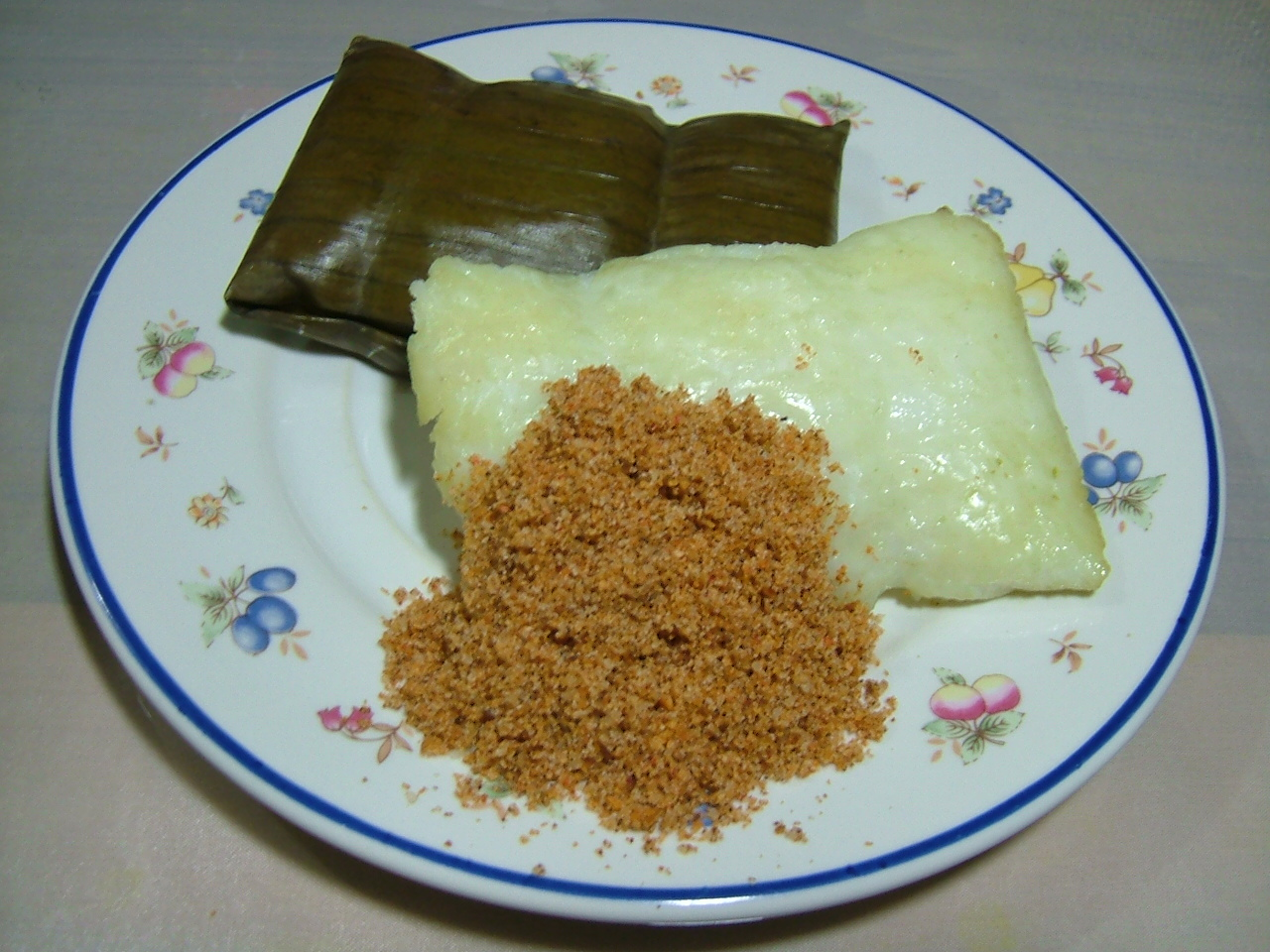
Burasa

==== As a food staple ====
In Indonesia rice cakes can be plain and bland tasting, and are often treated as a food staple, as an alternative to steamed rice.

- Burasa, a type of rice dumpling cooked with coconut milk packed inside a banana leaf pouch. It is a delicacy of the Bugis and Makassar people of South Sulawesi, Indonesia, and often consumed as a staple to replace steamed rice or ketupat. It is similar to lontong, but with richer flavour acquired from coconut milk.
- Ketupat, or packed rice is a type of rice dumpling of Indonesia. Also can be found in Brunei, Malaysia, and Singapore. It is made from rice that has been wrapped in a Rhombus or kite shaped woven palm leaf pouch and boiled. As the rice cooks, the grains expand to fill the pouch and the rice becomes compressed. This method of cooking gives the ketupat its characteristic form and texture of a rice dumpling. Ketupat is usually eaten with rendang or served as an accompaniment to satay or gado-gado. Ketupat is also traditionally served by Malays at open houses on festive occasions such as Idul Fitri (Hari Raya Aidilfitri). During Idul Fitri in Indonesia, ketupat is often served with opor ayam (chicken in coconut milk), accompanied with spicy soy powder.
- Lontong, popular in Indonesia and also can be found in Malaysia, is made of compressed rice that is then cut into small cakes. It is traditionally made by boiling the rice until it is partially cooked and packing it tightly into a rolled-up banana leaf. The leaf is secured and cooked in boiling water for about 90 minutes. Once the compacted rice has cooled, it can be cut up into bite-sized pieces. The dish is usually served cold or at room temperature with sauce-based dishes such as gado-gado and salads, although it can be eaten as an accompaniment to other dishes such as Satay and curries.
- Nasi himpit, can be found in Indonesia and Malaysia. Unlike ketupat or lontong, nasi himpit is not cooked in a wrapping. Instead, the already boiled or steamed rice is pounded in a mortar into paste which is then molded and cut into a cube before eating. It is often eaten with Sayur lodeh or Soto.

==== As a snack ====
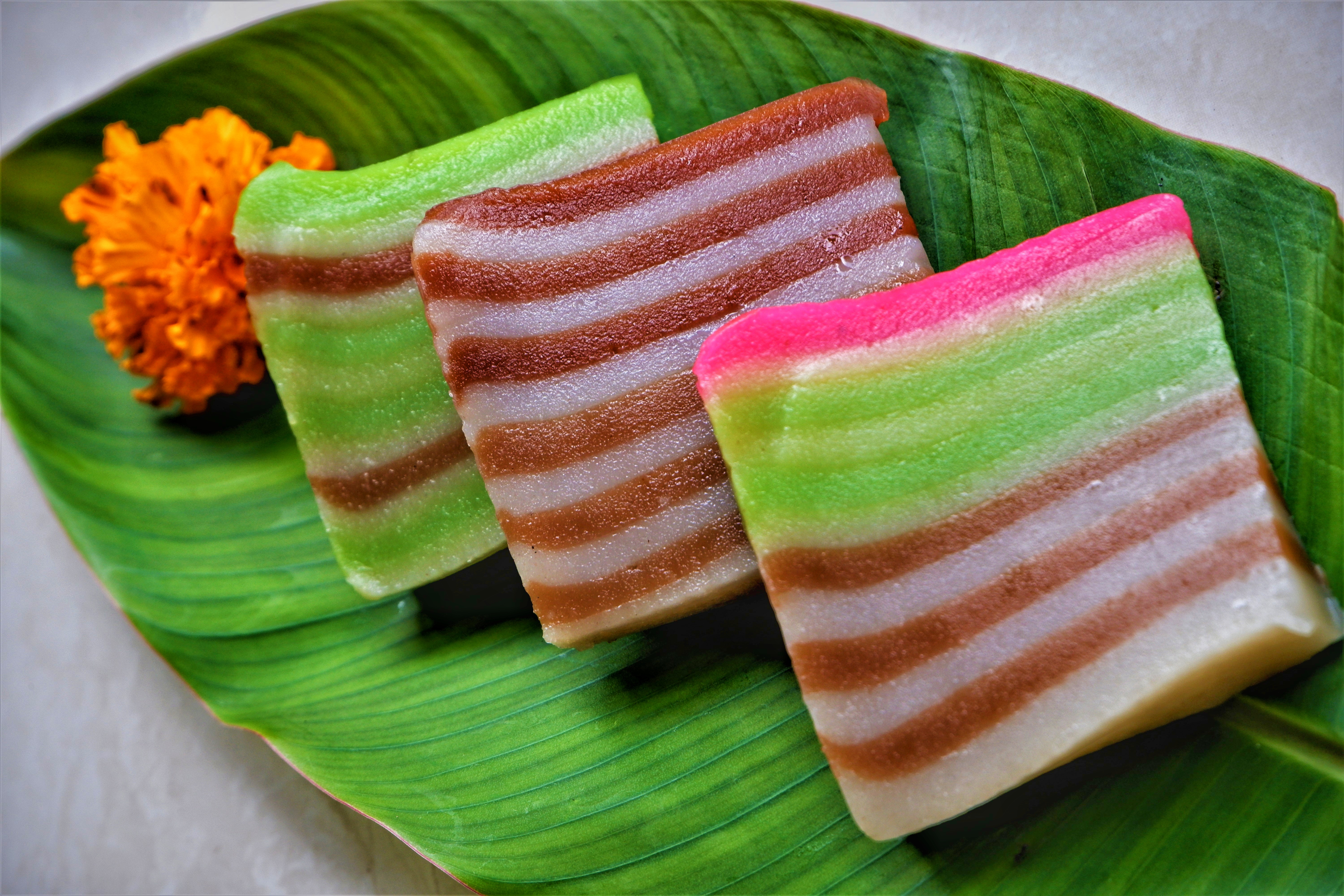
Kue lapis, multi-layered colorful sweet glutinous rice cake

Numerous types of Indonesian kue (traditional cake) are made using glutinous rice or rice flour. They can be sweet or savoury. Varieties include:

- Arem-arem, a smaller lontong filled with vegetables and meat.
- Klepon, balls of glutinous rice flour filled with gula jawa (red palm sugar) and boiled or steamed. Afterwards the balls are rolled in grated coconut. In Sumatra and the Malay Peninsula, they are called "onde-onde".
- Kue lapis, a layered colorful cake made of glutinous rice flour, coconut and sugar.
- Lemper, a savoury snack made of glutinous rice filled with chicken, fish or abon (meat floss). The meat filling is rolled inside the rice in a fashion very similar to Chinese zongzi. A variant of lemper which instead of being wrapped with a banana leaf is wrapped inside of a thin egg omelette is called semar mendem.
- Lepet, a sticky rice dumpling mixed with peanuts cooked with coconut milk and packed inside janur (young coconut leaf or palm leaf). It is a delicacy commonly found in Javanese and Sundanese cuisine and often consumed as snack.
- Lupis, compressed glutinous rice served with grated coconut and coconut sugar syrup.
- Nagasari or kue pisang, a traditional steamed cake made from rice flour, coconut milk and sugar and filled with slices of banana.
- Putu, green pandan-colored rice flour filled with coconut sugar and steamed in bamboo cylinder.
- Serabi, a type of pancake made from rice flour with coconut milk or just plain shredded coconut as an emulsifier.

=== Japanese ===
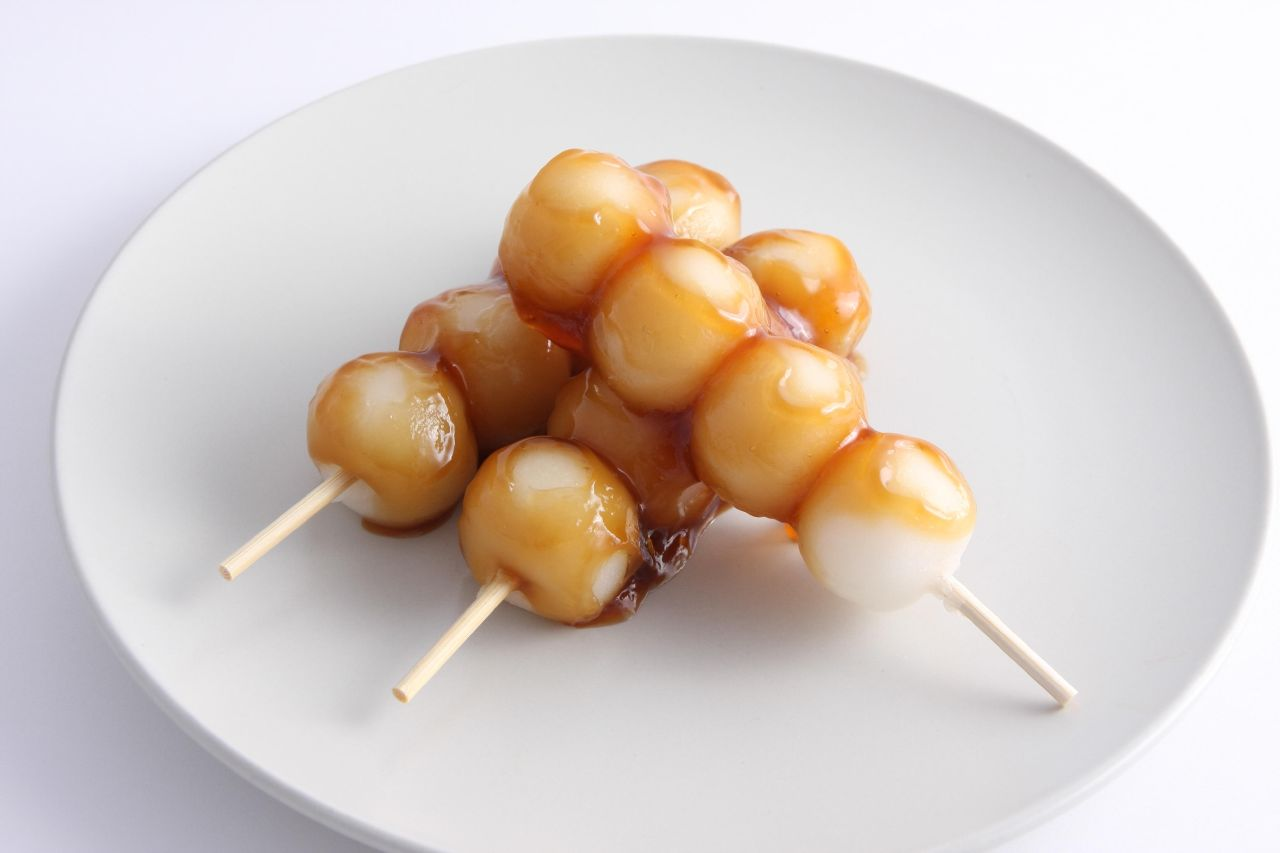
Dango, a Japanese dumpling made from rice-flour

- Mochi is made of glutinous rice pounded into paste and molded into shape. In Japan it is traditionally made in a ceremony called mochitsuki. While also eaten year-round, mochi is a traditional food for the Japanese New Year and is commonly sold and eaten during that time.
- Senbei are a type of Japanese rice crackers, usually cooked by being baked or grilled, traditionally over charcoal. While being prepared they may be brushed with a flavoring sauce, often one made of soy sauce and mirin. They may then be wrapped with a layer of nori. Alternatively they may be flavored with salt or so-called "salad" flavoring.
- Dango are a form of rice-flour dumpling often served on a skewer and with many different flavors eaten traditionally during different seasons.

=== Korean ===
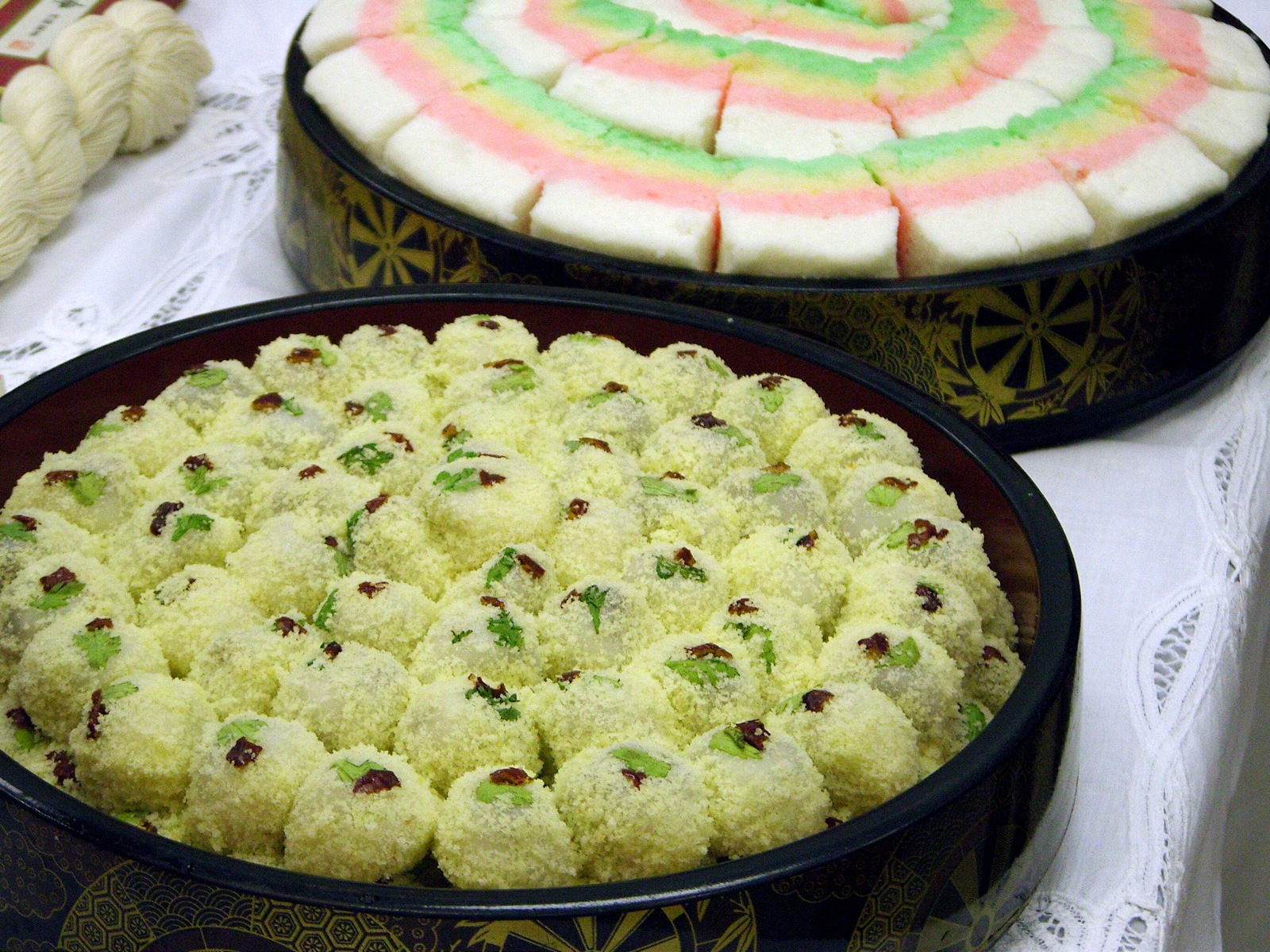
Tteok; Korean rice cakes

Steamed rice cake in an earthenware steamer was the oldest principal food for Koreans before sticky rice took over upon the invention of the iron pot. Now, there are hundreds of different kinds of Korean rice cake or tteok eaten year round. In Korea, it is customary to eat tteok guk (tteok soup) on New Year's Day and sweet tteok at weddings and on birthdays. It is often considered a celebratory food and can range from rather elaborate versions or down to the plain-flavored tteok. Rice cakes are chosen for particular occasions depending on their color and the role they play in Korea's traditional yin-yang cosmology.

- Tteok is a class of Korean cakes mostly made with glutinous rice flour (also known as sweet rice or chapssal). Tteok is usually divided into four categories: steamed tteok (찌는 떡; 甑餠), pounded tteok (치는 떡; 搗餠), boiled tteok (삶는 떡; 搗餠), and pan-fried tteok (지지는 떡; 油煎餠).
- Sirutteok is one kind of steamed tteok made from rice (맵쌀) or glutinous rice (찹쌀; chapssal) which are sometimes mixed together with other grains, beans (azuki beans or mung beans), sesame seeds, wheat flour, or starch. Fruits and nuts are used as subsidiary ingredients.
- Injeolmi is an example of pounded tteok. The traditional preparation for pounded tteok is made by pounding rice or glutinous rice with utensils called jeolgu and jeolgutgongi or tteokme and anban. Injeolmi (tteok coated with bean powder), garaetteok (가래떡; cylinder-shaped white tteok), jeolpyeon (절편; patterned tteok) and danja (단자; glutinous tteok ball coated with bean paste) are commonly eaten pounded tteok.
- Songpyeon and bupyeon are rice cakes which have been molded into shape. There are dozens of these kinds of cakes in Korea. Some consist of glutinous rice flour dough and a sweet filling covered with gomul, a kind of powdered beans.
- Kkultteok (꿀떡; lit. 'honey tteok') is made by mixing honey with glutinous rice powder and sieving it with chestnuts, jujubes, pine nuts, etc. Kkultteok is similar to songpyeon in shape, but smaller in size.
- Hwajeon are small sweet pancakes made of glutinous rice flour and flower petals from seasonal blooms, such as the Korean azalea, chrysanthemum, or rose.
- Tteokbokki is a stir-fried dish made with garaetteok and commonly sold by street vendors. It is usually seasoned with gochujang (chili paste) but can also be served with a sauce based on soy sauce and commonly contains fish cake, boiled eggs, and green onion.
- Tteokguk is a soup that is eaten after the Korean New Year. It contains such ingredients as sliced tteok, anchovy, green onion, and eggs.
- Mujigae-tteok or 'rainbow rice cake' is a layered tteok of different colors resembling a rainbow. Colors are typically light red, yellow, and green.

=== Malaysian ===
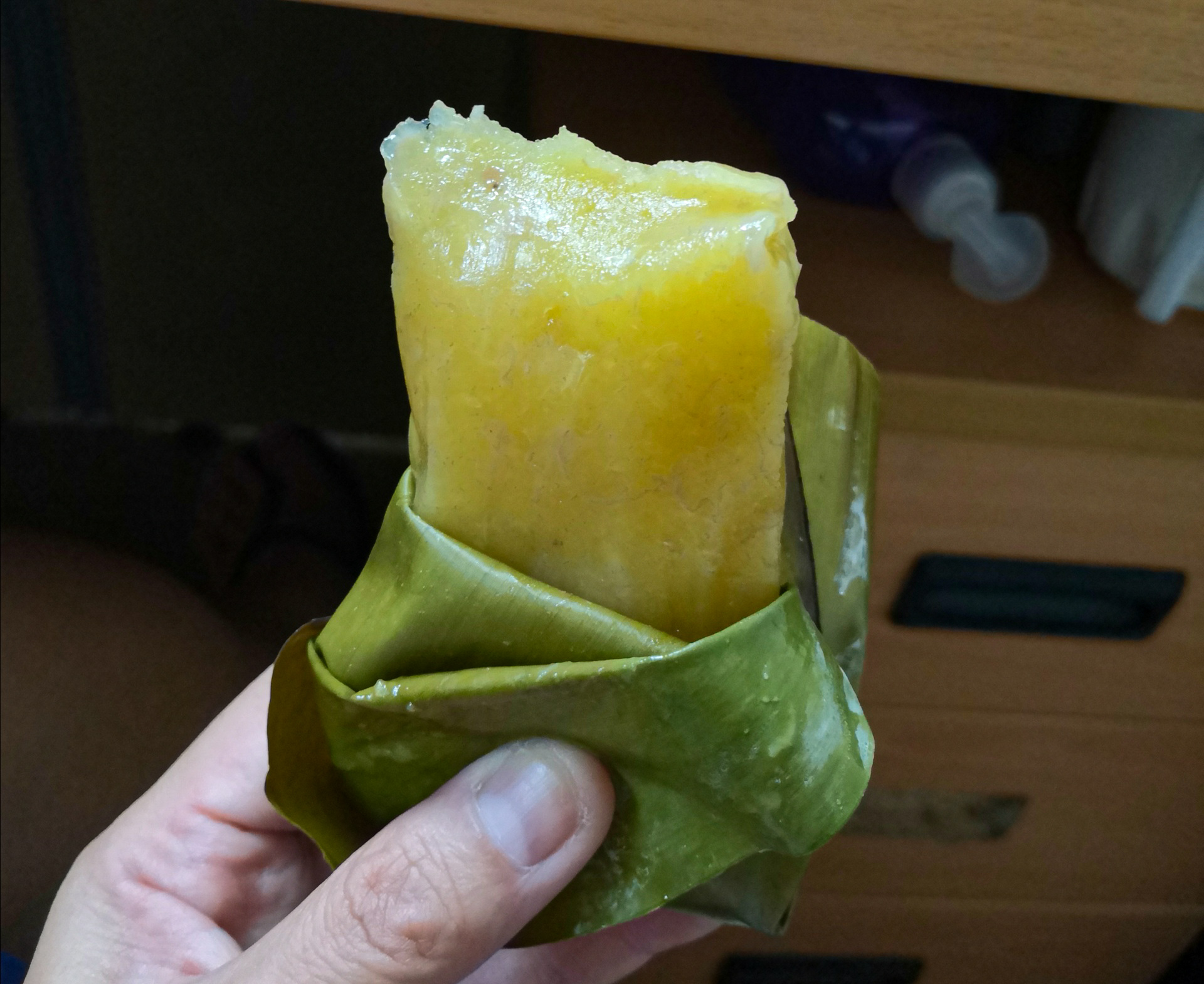
Hinompuka, traditional sweet rice cake among the indigenous Kadazan-Dusun of Borneo

Malaysian cuisine, especially their kuih that is made from glutinous rice, features a variety of sweet and savoury rice cakes. Examples include the following:

- Hinompuka, traditional steamed rice cake among the indigenous Kadazan-Dusun of Sabah, known for its sweetness, chewy texture, fatty taste, and fragrant aroma often served during the harvest festival of Kaamatan.
- Kelupis, traditional glutinous rice roll snack for the western coast inhabitants of East Malaysia and neighbouring Brunei, often served during weddings and Eid al-Fitr.
- Ketupat, Malay and Maritime Southeast Asia traditional glutinous rice dessert.
- Lamban, traditional glutinous rice dessert for the western coast inhabitants of East Malaysia and neighbouring Brunei, often served during weddings, feasts, cukur jambul (Aqiqah) ceremonies as well as Eid al-Fitr.
- Lemang, a Malay, Minangkabau and Orang Asli traditional glutinous rice dish in West Malaysia and neighbouring Sumatra of Indonesia, often served during Eid al-Fitr and Eid al-Adha.

=== Nepalese ===
- Yomari, originating in the Kathmandu Valley of central Nepal, is a sweet steamed rice cake made of glutinous rice flour and filled with a variety of fillings, the most popular being Khuwa and Chaku (Molasses).
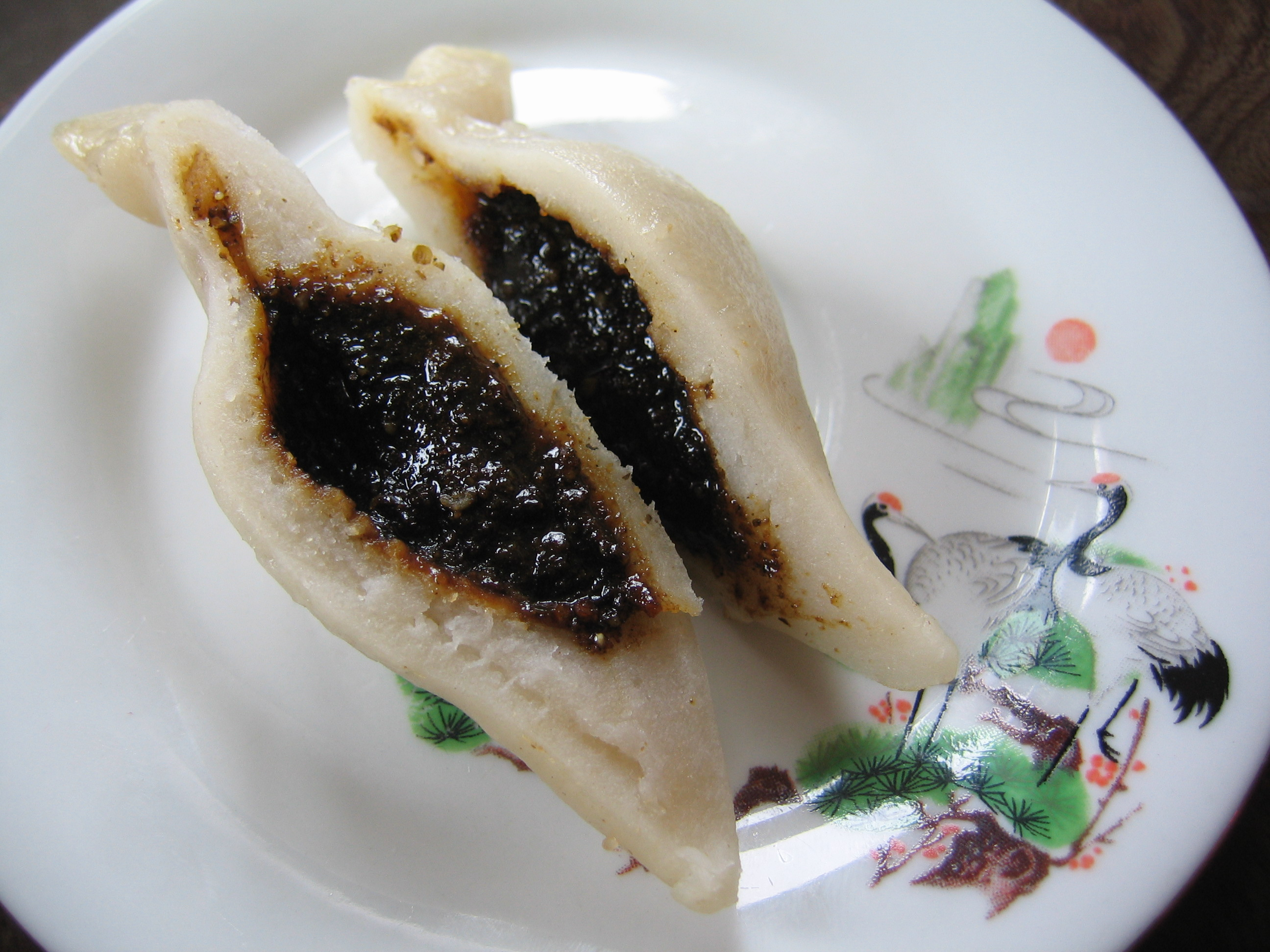
  A yomari filled with chaku (molasses)
- Bhakkha is a savory rice cake common in southeastern Nepal and also popular in neighboring parts of India and Bangladesh. It is a steamed rice cake often served with a spicy sauce.

=== Sri Lankan ===
- Idli, originating in South India, it is a savoury rice cake that is popularly eaten for breakfast.
- Puttu, originating in South India, it is widely consumed throughout the country. It is a cylinder made out of steamed ground rice and coconut.
- Seenakku, a rice cake made out of glutinous rice and served with grated coconut, it derives from the Chinese nian gao.
- Kiribath, a rice cake made out of rice cooked in coconut milk and commonly eaten for breakfast. The name means "milk rice" in Sinhala. It is cut into pieces and served on special occasions, such as New Year's, birthdays, or religious festivals.

=== Taiwanese ===
- Tainan bowl rice cake (óaⁿ-kóe, 碗粿) has its origins in the southern Taiwanese city of Tainan. The dish is made by steaming glutinous rice once, then putting toppings in it and steaming it again.

=== Vietnamese ===
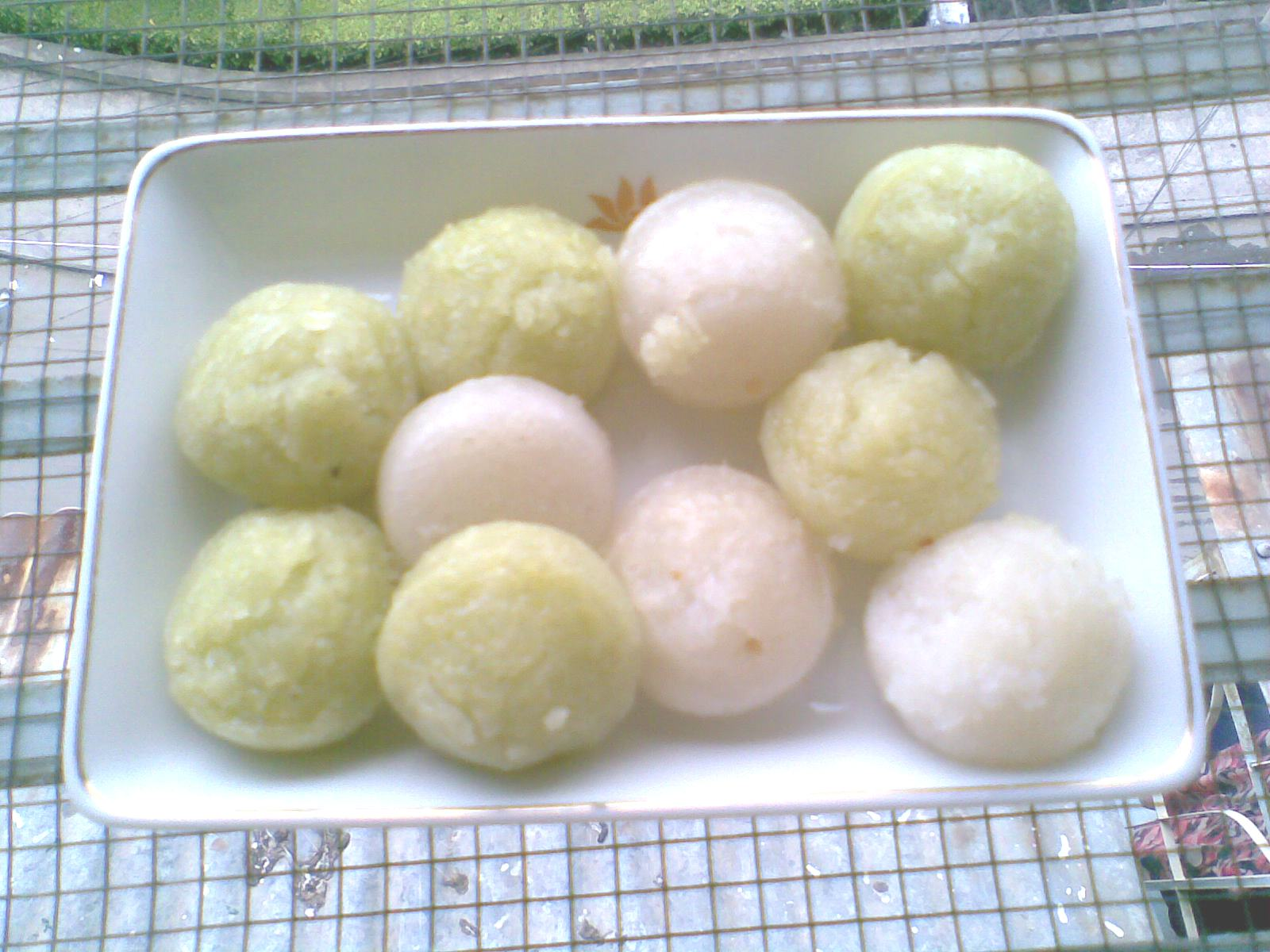
Steamed Bánh bò, a sweet, chewy Vietnamese sponge cake made from rice flour

- Bánh bèo is a variety of small steamed rice cake or rice pancake typically featuring a dimple in the center, which is filled with savory ingredients including chopped dried or fresh shrimp, scallions, mung bean paste, crispy fried shallots, fish sauce, rice vinegar, and oil.
- Bánh bò is a sweet, chewy sponge cake made from rice flour, water, sugar, and yeast.
- Bánh đúc is a cake made from non-glutinous rice flour (although corn flour is also used in northern Vietnam). In the north it is typically garnished with savory ingredients such as ground pork, tôm chấy (grilled ground shrimp), fried onions, sesame seeds, salt, peanuts, lime juice, and soy sauce or fish sauce. In the south, it is served as a dessert, and takes the form of gelatinous blocks that are often colored green by the addition of Pandanus amaryllifolius leaf extract. It is cooked by boiling the ingredients and allowing them to cool, solidifying into a jelly-like sheet that is then cut into blocks.
- Bánh chưng is made from glutinous rice, mung bean, pork and other ingredients. Bánh tét is much the same but cut in a circular form, and consumed in celebration of the Vietnamese holiday Tết.
- Bánh tổ is a rice cake made out of glutinous rice and is related to the Chinese nian gao.

=== In other cuisines ===
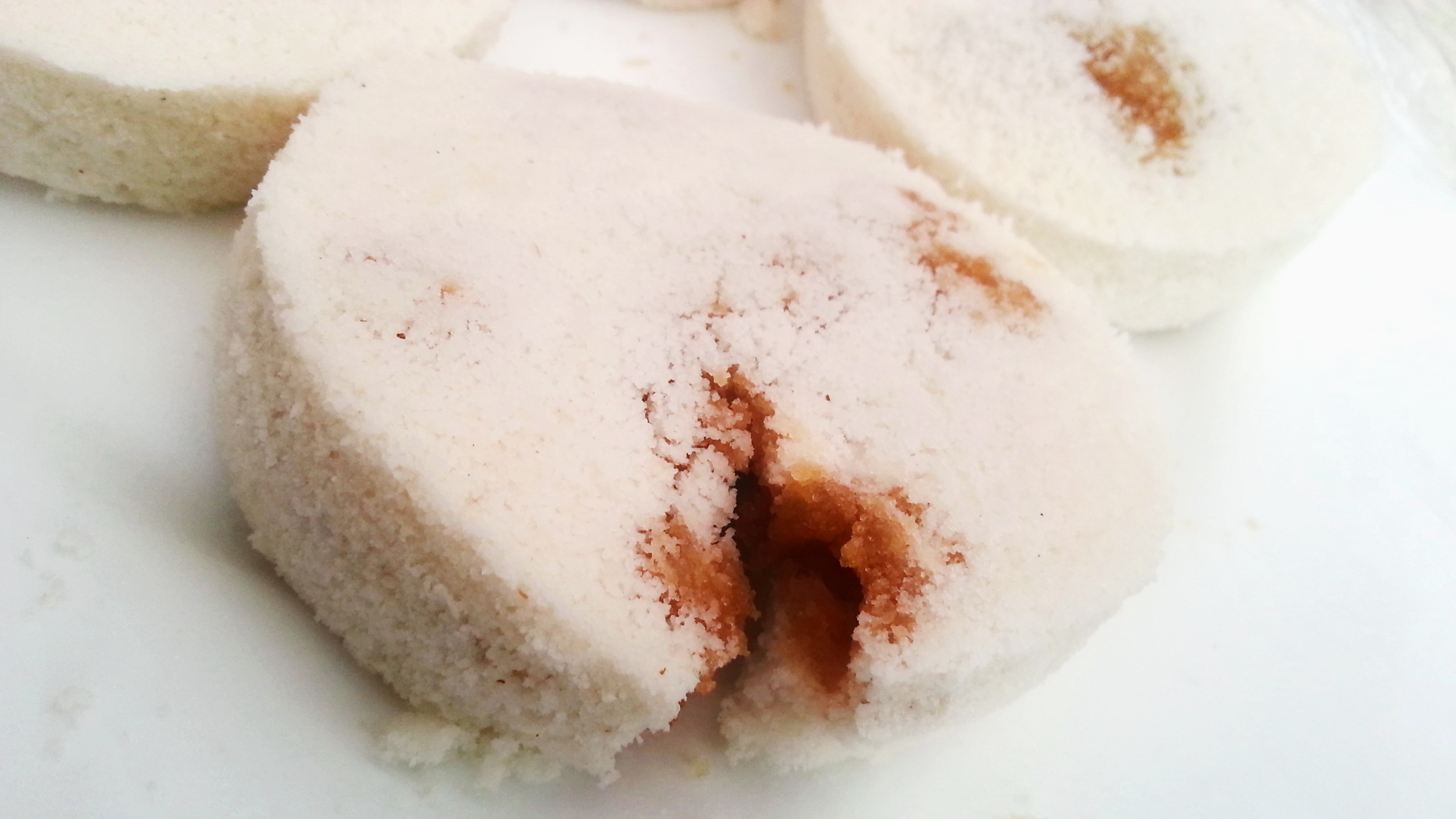
Bangladeshi style rice cake, originally known as Bhapa Pitha, eaten with molasses as a sweetener

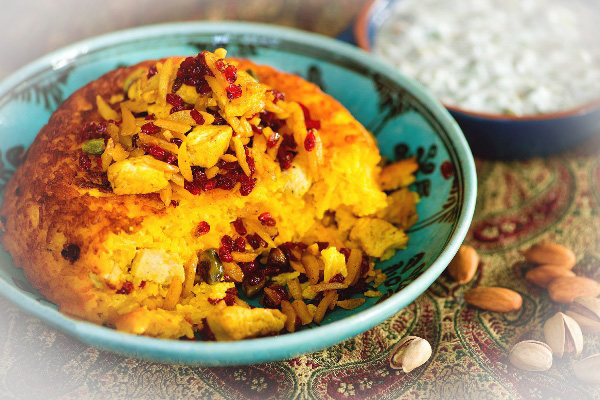
Tahchin or Persian baked Saffron rice cake. Decorated with Barberries, Almond and Pistachio slices

- Chwee kueh, (lit. 'water rice cake') is a type of steamed rice cake, a cuisine of Singapore and Johor. It is made by mixing rice flour and water to form a slightly viscous mixture, which is then placed in small cup-shaped containers that look like saucers and steamed, forming a characteristic bowl-like shape when cooked. The rice cakes are topped with diced preserved radish and served with chilli sauce. Chwee kueh is a popular breakfast item in Singapore and Johor.
- in Ryukyuan cuisine, Muchi or Uni muchi is a type of steamed rice cake made with glutinous rice, brown sugar, white sugar, purple yam and so on.
- Puffed rice cakes, popular in North America and other Western countries, are made with puffed rice, a puffed grain usually created by heating rice kernels under high pressure in the presence of steam, though the method of manufacture varies widely. The puffed grains are then bonded together by a wide variety of methods in the form of a cake. They are popular among young children and among health-conscious people as a lower calorie substitute for bread, crackers, or chips. They may be plain, salted, flavored or half coated in chocolate or yogurt.
- Rijsttaart and Rijstevlaai in Dutch and Belgian cuisine are kinds of rice pie, with the filling of mixed rice, sugar, eggs and milk.
- In Italian cuisine, specifically the cuisine of Tuscany, torte di riso are rice cakes sometimes eaten as a substantial dessert at the end of a meal.
- In Iranian cuisine, Tahchin or Persian baked rice cake is a type of steamed rice cake made with yogurt, saffron, eggs, and chicken fillets.
- In Nigerian Cuisine, Masa is a rice cake similar to a pan fried rice cake in an oval shape eaten with different stews, and is from the Northern Region particularly the Hausa ethnic group.
- Vitumbua is a coastal East- African Swahili dish made of rice or rice flour and coconut eaten mostly for breakfast.

== See also ==
- List of rice dishes
- List of steamed foods
- chimaki
- ohagi
- Zongzi
