= Dong New Year =

Traditional festival of the Dong people

- Observed by: Dong people
- Type: Ethnic festival
- Significance: Harvest celebration, ancestor worship, family reunion
- Date: Tenth to eleventh months of the Chinese lunar calendar
- Frequency: Annual

Dong New Year is an important traditional festival of the Dong people, primarily celebrated in Dong-inhabited regions of Guizhou, Hunan, and Guangxi. The festival embodies multiple functions and meanings, including celebrating the harvest, honoring ancestors, strengthening family reunions, promoting inter-village exchanges, and preserving cultural traditions. In 2011, Dong New Year, as nominated by Rongjiang County, was approved by the State Council of the People's Republic of China for inclusion in the third batch of the National Intangible Cultural Heritage List.

== Introduction ==
Dong New Year, also known as the “Winter Festival,” is commonly referred to in the Dong language as “Ningx Gam” or “Ningx Gaem,” meaning “eating winter.” In some regions, it is also known as “Yang Festival,” “Nian Geng,” “Nian Nei,” or “La Year.” Among these names, “Yang Festival” suggests that the celebration originally belonged to people with the Yang surname before being adopted by other clans, while the latter three names are used to distinguish the festival from the Han Chinese Spring Festival, which is regarded as the “major New Year.” Another view holds that the term “eating winter” is related to the consumption of fish jelly during the festival and may have evolved from the phrase “eating jelly.”

The date of Dong New Year is not fixed and is generally celebrated between late October and early November of the traditional Chinese lunar calendar. In the Rongjiang area of Guizhou, it is usually observed from late October to early November. In some villages of Jinping County, people with the Yang surname traditionally celebrate the festival on the 26th day of the tenth lunar month, those with the Luo surname on the 27th day, and other clans on the first day of the eleventh lunar month. In parts of Liping County, Dong New Year is also celebrated between the third and fifth days of the eleventh lunar month. The duration of the festival varies by locality, ranging from a single day to several consecutive days. Since the 1980s, the first day of the eleventh lunar month has gradually become a more commonly observed public celebration date.

== Origins and History ==
At present, there are no clear early written records regarding the formation of Dong New Year, and its exact origins remain uncertain. Existing Dong studies, local historical sources, and oral traditions offer several explanations for the festival's origins.

Ancestor Worship Theory: This interpretation holds that after the ancestors of the Dong people migrated to and settled in their present regions, they gradually transitioned from hunting and fishing to agriculture. Following the autumn harvest, they began holding celebrations to give thanks for the harvest and to honor their ancestors, eventually giving rise to Dong New Year. In places such as Tongdao Dong Autonomous County in Hunan, the custom of recognizing shared ancestry through the ritual of “combining tripod pots” (he ding guan) has been preserved and is regarded as an important local expression of this tradition.

Migration Commemoration Theory: Folklore in areas such as Sanjiang Dong Autonomous County in Guangxi links Dong New Year to the migration history of the Dong ancestors. According to these traditions, descendants invite their ancestors home for the New Year and conduct sacrificial ceremonies to commemorate the hardships endured during migration and settlement, making Dong New Year an important cultural vehicle for preserving collective ethnic memory.

Refuge from Warfare Theory: This explanation is commonly found in places such as the Jiuzhai area of Gaopo in Jinping County and parts of Rongjiang County in Guizhou. According to this narrative, the ancestors of the Dong people, fleeing warfare or oppression, gathered and celebrated the New Year ahead of schedule shortly before the traditional year-end. Their descendants subsequently preserved this custom. In Rongjiang traditions, it is also said that ancestors of the Luo clan, having learned that troops would soon pass through the area, slaughtered pigs and cattle to celebrate the New Year in advance on the twenty-seventh day of the eleventh lunar month. Other clans later followed suit and held banquets on the first day of the twelfth lunar month in return.

Hero Commemoration Theory: This explanation is particularly prominent in Bajiang Township of Sanjiang Dong Autonomous County in Guangxi and in parts of Liping County in Guizhou. Among some Yang clan communities in the Bajiang area, members conduct a “wild sacrifice” (yeji) at ancestral graves outside the village on the first day of the eleventh lunar month. During the ceremony, clan elders recount stories of Dong heroes who brought fire and enabled their people to live in peace and prosperity. In parts of Liping, Dong New Year is likewise said to be celebrated in memory of ancestral heroes.

Influence of the Winter Solstice Festival Theory: Another view suggests that Dong New Year may have been influenced by, or developed in interaction with, Han Chinese Winter Solstice customs. Since both festivals are generally celebrated during the winter season and involve ancestor worship, family reunions, and communal feasting, some scholars have noted similarities between them. However, the precise nature of their historical relationship remains unclear.

From a historical perspective, prior to the twentieth century, Dong New Year primarily existed as a local seasonal festival. Its date, name, and customs varied from place to place, although such elements as ancestor worship, harvest celebration, and clan reunions had already become relatively stable. Historical records indicate that in the winter of 1938, members of the Yang clan of the Dong people in Wuwuping, Bajiang Village, Sanjiang Dong Autonomous County, Guangxi, held a Winter Festival sacrificial ceremony, which continued to be observed in subsequent years. In the early 1980s, Dong officials and scholars from Guizhou, Hunan, and Guangxi, while discussing A Brief History of the Dong People, agreed to designate the first day of the eleventh lunar month as Dong New Year. In 1984, the People's Government of Guangxi officially designated the first day of the eleventh lunar month as the Dong “Winter Festival” (Chidong Festival). Thereafter, “Dong New Year” gradually became the more widely used public designation, and Dong communities in cities such as Guiyang, Beijing, Nanning, Kaili, Huaihua, and Liuzhou also began holding Dong New Year or Winter Festival celebrations.

In 2006, Dong New Year was included in the Provincial Intangible Cultural Heritage Protection List of Guizhou Province. On May 23, 2011, Dong New Year, as nominated by Rongjiang County, was approved by the State Council for inclusion in the third batch of China's National Intangible Cultural Heritage List. The revised Regulations on the Autonomy of the Qiandongnan Miao and Dong Autonomous Prefecture, adopted in 2020, stipulate that all citizens within the prefecture are entitled to one day of public holiday on the first day of the eleventh lunar month in observance of Dong New Year.

== Festival Customs ==
=== Sa Worship ===
Ritual worship is one of the central components of Dong New Year celebrations. In places such as Zhaoxing, Liping County, Guizhou, a ceremony known as Sa Worship (Jisa) is held during the festival. “Sa,” also known as Sasui or Sama, means “First Grandmother” or “Great Ancestress” in the Dong language and refers to the ancestral grandmother deity of the Dong people. The ceremony generally proceeds as follows: village elders, drum tower custodians, and other organizers assemble with villagers at the drum tower, where sacrificial offerings and ceremonial items, including festival pigs, banners, gongs, and drums, are prepared. The procession then departs from the drum tower and passes through several drum towers within the village, accompanied by performances featuring the Lusheng, drums, and gongs. Upon reaching the ritual site, village elders and the chief officiant sit within the ceremonial enclosure, while other villagers form concentric circles according to age and gender. The ceremony is conducted through ritual recitations and dousha (the singing of ancestral songs). After the ritual concludes, participants gather to perform traditional song-hall dances and other celebratory activities. The entire process serves functions of village inspection, ancestor worship, blessing rituals, and communal education.

Sa Worship is performed not only to pray for favorable weather, flourishing livestock, and the safety and prosperity of the village, but also reflects the Dong people's system of communal organization centered on the drum tower and village elders. Through preparing for and participating in the ceremony, younger generations learn ritual procedures and customary norms from their elders, making the ritual an important means of intergenerational cultural transmission.[10] In addition, some communities conduct ancestral rites in clan halls or within the home, where offerings of food, incense, and ritual paper are presented. Participants recite prayers or auspicious phrases to honor their ancestors, express gratitude for ancestral virtues, commemorate migration histories, and seek peace, protection from misfortune, and abundant harvests.

=== Food and Cuisine ===
On the eve of Dong New Year, households typically make extensive preparations for the festival, including slaughtering pigs, sheep, chickens, and ducks, making glutinous rice cakes (ciba), brewing rice wine and sweet rice wine, and preparing oil tea.

In addition, fish jelly is regarded as a representative festive food in some Dong communities. It is typically prepared by cooking fish with pickled vegetables or sour fish broth, together with seasonings such as yuxiangcao (fish mint herb), fennel, and ginger. After cooking, the dish is left outdoors overnight to cool naturally and solidify into a jelly-like form, which is eaten the following day. Owing to its distinctive flavor and warming qualities, it has become a characteristic dish of winter celebrations. The custom of eating fish jelly is preserved in places such as the Seventy-Two Dong Villages of Rongjiang, the Nine Villages of Jinping, and Tongdao in Hunan. In addition to fish jelly, festive meals during Dong New Year commonly feature newly brewed rice wine, glutinous rice, pickled fish, cured meat, pickled vegetables, and various cold dishes, often shared at long-table banquets or family reunion feasts.

Local legends also hold that eels once helped the ancestors of the Dong people escape danger during their migration. As a result, some communities observe a taboo against eating eels during Dong New Year.

=== Social Activities ===
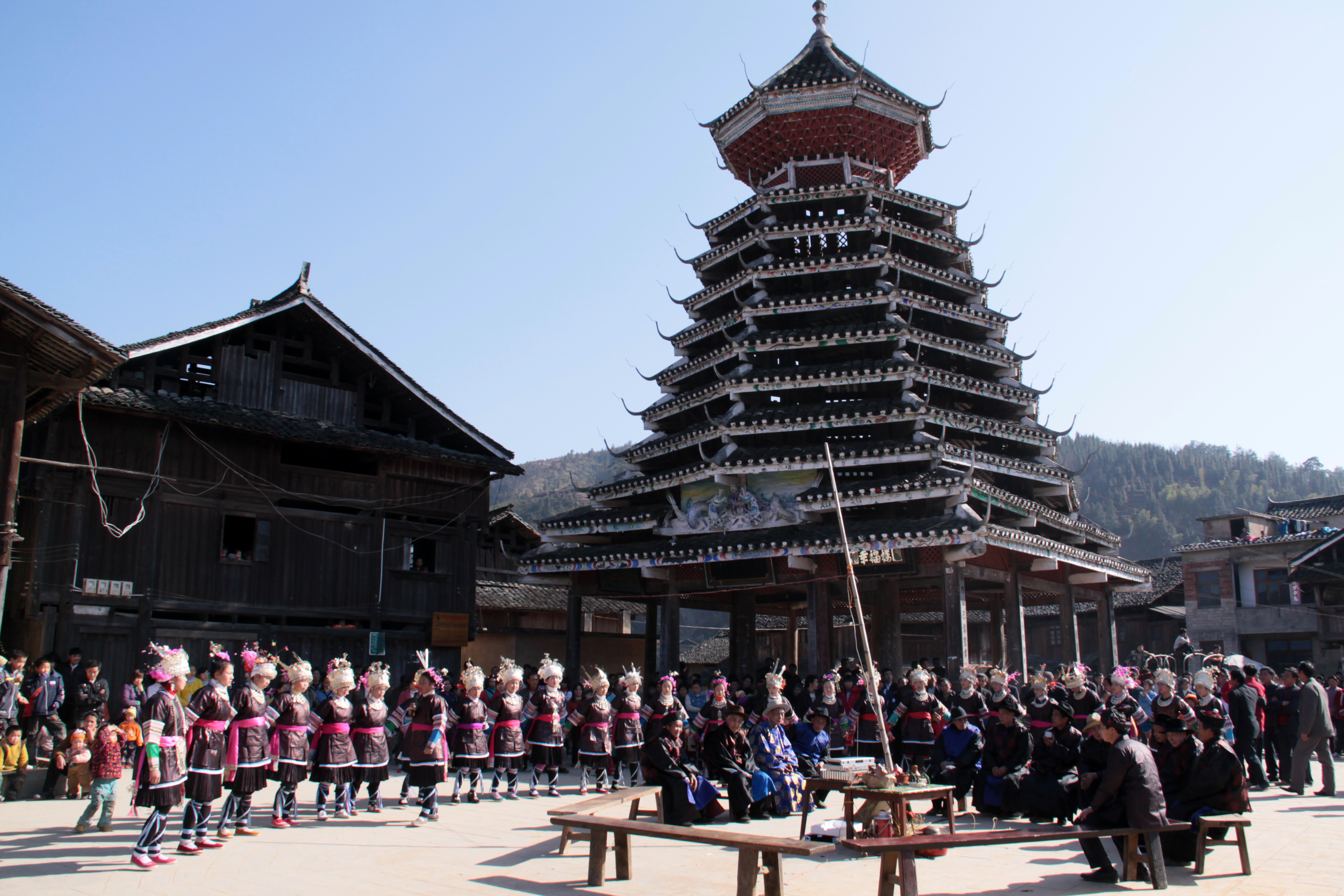
Dong Songs and Dances

==== Grand Song of the Dong ====
Dong New Year is an important occasion for the performance of the Dong singing tradition. The Grand Song of the Dong, known in the Dong language as Galao, derives its name from ga (“song”) and lao (“grand” or “ancient”). It is a form of multi-part choral singing performed collectively without a conductor or instrumental accompaniment. One of its most distinctive features is the combination of a low-pitched chorus with a high-pitched lead voice. Requiring the participation of multiple singers, the tradition serves functions of musical performance, historical remembrance, and social interaction.

Traditionally, children in Dong villages join singing groups from an early age and receive instruction from song masters during the agricultural off-season until they are able to participate independently in antiphonal singing at the drum tower. The repertoire of the Grand Song of the Dong covers a wide range of themes, including nature, labor, love, and friendship. It serves not only as an important means of cultural transmission but also as a significant medium for social interaction among young men and women. During Dong New Year, antiphonal singing and singing competitions held at drum towers often feature alternating performances by singing groups from different villages and of different genders, sometimes continuing throughout the night.

=== Duoye Dance ===
Duoye (known in Chinese as caigetang, literally “stepping the song hall”) is a representative form of Dong collective song and dance performed without instrumental accompaniment, combining singing and dancing in a group setting. It is one of the most common forms of public entertainment during Dong New Year.

Duoye has a long history and is generally believed to have originated from the productive labor activities of the Dong ancestors. According to the performance context, it can be divided into two forms: Yetang and Yediao. The former is primarily used to praise ancestral founders and conduct rituals of worship and blessing. It is usually performed during ceremonial occasions, led by respected elders, with participants forming a circle and singing and dancing in unison, creating a solemn atmosphere. The latter is more commonly performed at gatherings, welcoming ceremonies, celebrations, and major festivals, and is characterized by a more relaxed and lively atmosphere.

During Dong New Year, Duoye performances are primarily festive collective song-and-dance activities, apart from those associated with Sa worship rituals. Participants may sing in alternating male and female groups, join hands in a circle, or stand shoulder to shoulder facing the center of the circle while singing and dancing. Basic movements include swinging the arms, stepping forward and backward, and moving around the circle. The singing may be led by a single performer with responses from the group, or take the form of antiphonal singing between women and men. Lyrics are often interspersed with vocables such as “Ya Luo Ye” and “Ye Ha Ye Luo Ye,” which contribute to the rhythmic character and interactive nature of the performance.

Within Dong villages, ye masters, song masters, and village elders often assume responsibilities for organizing, leading, and transmitting the tradition during Duoye activities. Members of village opera troupes, cultural performance groups, and ordinary villagers participate not only as performers but also as transmitters of the tradition. Owing to its relatively simple movements, broad participation, and widespread performance contexts, Duoye is not only one of the liveliest social activities during Dong New Year but also an important means through which Dong communities reinforce cultural identity and maintain social cohesion.

In addition, a custom known as “Horse-Riding in the Song Hall” is preserved in places such as the Seventy-Two Dong Villages of Rongjiang County. During this activity, young men ride horses into the song hall for amusement, while young women attempt to lasso the horses with decorated ribbons and sing songs of blessing, thereby adding to the festive atmosphere.

=== Youth Social Activities ===
Dong New Year is also an important occasion for social interaction among young men and women. In the northern Dong regions, activities such as “Wanshan” (“mountain outings”) and “Ganao” (“gatherings at mountain passes”) are commonly held, usually during the daytime. During these festive events, young people travel together in groups, engage in antiphonal singing and question-and-answer exchanges, and become acquainted with one another through observation and interaction. Such activities often provide opportunities for the development of friendships and romantic relationships.

For example, in Yuping Dong Autonomous County, the traditional Dong singing gathering known as Ganao is a typical form of youth social activity. These gatherings are usually held at mountain passes and are associated with fixed dates in the lunar calendar. On the day of the gathering, young men and women dress in their finest attire and assemble at the site, where they engage in antiphonal folk singing in groups. Through “Shang'ao Songs” (“songs for entering the gathering”), participants exchange their names, and through “Jiedai Songs” (“songs of borrowing a sash”), they express romantic interest. If mutual affection develops, the young woman may lend personal items such as a sash, apron, or embroidered handkerchief to the young man as a token of affection or pledge. At the conclusion of the gathering, participants sing “Xia'ao Songs” (“songs for leaving the gathering”) or farewell songs and arrange the time and place of their next meeting.

In the southern Dong regions, social activities more commonly take the form of “Xingge Zuoye” (“walking and singing, sitting and singing at night”) and “Zhaozhai” (“visiting villages”), which are generally held in the evening. During Dong New Year, the concentration of relatives, friends, and festive activities creates favorable opportunities for young men and women to establish relationships through singing and social interaction. As a result, the festival often serves as an important occasion for courtship and marriage-related activities. In some areas, weddings are deliberately held during Dong New Year so that families can celebrate the union and host relatives and friends within the festive atmosphere.
