= Num akor =

Cambodian dessert

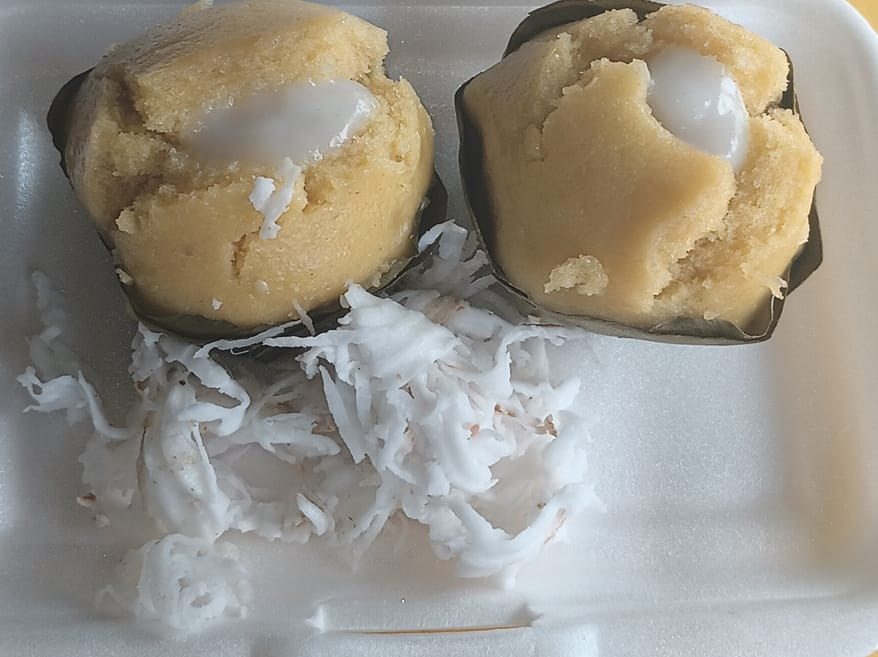
- Nom akor with grated coconut and a coconut cream (ktis doung) filling
- Alternative names: num ah kor, nom akor, nom ah kor
- Type: steamed rice cake
- Course: dessert/snack
- Place of origin: Cambodia
- Region or state: Southeast Asia
- Main ingredients: fermented rice flour, palm sugar, yeast, water, coconut cream or grated coconut

Num akor or num ah kor (Khmer: នំអាកោរ) is a Cambodian steamed rice cake made from fermented rice flour.

== Etymology ==
In Khmer, the term num (នំ) refers to cakes, cookies, or many desserts in general.

== Preparation ==
The batter consists of rice flour, palm sugar, and water, left to ferment overnight before being steamed in small molds. They are served with coconut cream or grated coconut. In modern versions pandan leaf juice is sometimes added to the batter.

== Consumption ==
In Cambodia, num akor is commonly sold in markets such as Old Market in Siem Reap, as well as Orussey Market and Central Market in Phnom Penh, typically in sets of four to six cakes. It is eaten as a snack, dessert, or during festive occasions.
