= Xinghua Shui Ethnic Township =

Xinghua Sui Ethnic Township 兴华水族乡
- Township
- Interactive map of Xinghua Sui Ethnic Township
- Coordinates: 25°50′29″N 108°09′57″E
- Country: People's Republic of China
- Province: Guizhou
- Autonomous prefecture: Qiandongnan
- County: Rongjiang
- Village-level divisions: 9 villages
- Elevation: 331 m (1,086 ft)
- Time zone: UTC+8 (China Standard)
- Area code: 0855

Xinghua Sui Ethnic Township (simplified Chinese: 兴华水族乡; traditional Chinese: 興華水族鄉; pinyin: Xīnghuá Shuǐzú Xiāng) is a township of southern Rongjiang County in southeastern Guizhou province, China, located about 37 kilometres (23 mi) southwest of the county seat at an elevation of 331 m (1,086 ft), which is low-lying for Guizhou's standards. As of 2011, it has nine villages under its administration.

== See also ==
- List of township-level divisions of Guizhou
