= Village Super League =

Grassroots football initiative in Guizhou, China

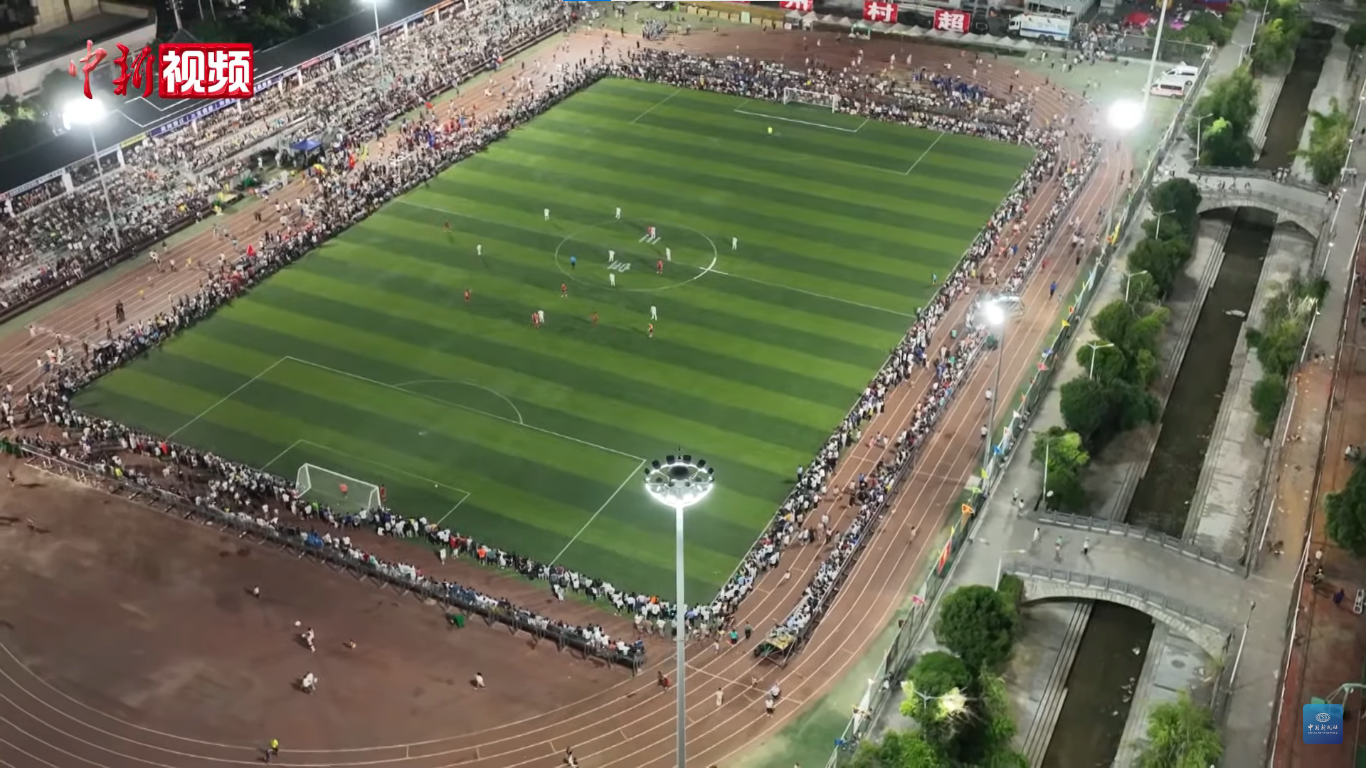
A "Village Super League" competition in Rongjiang County in June 2023

The Village Super League (VSL or Cun Chao, Chinese: 村超; pinyin: Cūn Chāo) is a grassroots football initiative originated in Rongjiang County, Qiandongnan Miao and Dong Autonomous Prefecture, Guizhou Province in Southwest China. It integrates sports, cultural preservation, and rural revitalization. Its mission is to foster community cohesion, promote ethnic cultural heritage, and drive sustainable socio-economic development in rural areas through amateur football. Prioritizing local participation and non-commercial values, the vision is to empower villagers as both creators and beneficiaries of a shared cultural and economic ecosystem.

== History ==
Football was introduced to Rongjiang in the 1940s by Guangxi University students fleeing Japanese invasion. Local enthusiasm grew, leading to organized matches in schools and communities. By the 1950s, football became a staple activity in schools, with Rongjiang Middle School emerging as a training ground for early talent.

In 1965, Rongjiang team won the Qiandongnan Prefecture Football Championship, cementing the sport's popularity. By the 1980s, football became integral to local life, with parents encouraging children to join youth training programs. A saying emerged "To secure a job, learn football" (Chinese: 要想找工作不愁，就要学会踢足球), reflecting that parents encouraged youth participation in football training programs.

In 1990, the Rongjiang Football Association was established. Villagers built makeshift fields on flood-damaged land, which laid the foundation for today's "Cun Chao".

By 2021, Rongjiang was designated a National Football Model County, recognizing its grassroots infrastructure and youth development programs.

The inaugural Cun Chao tournament launched in January 2023, with eight village teams competing. Initially organized as a small tournament among eight villages in Sanbao Dong Village (Chinese: 三宝侗寨), the league expanded to include 20 teams from across the county. Matches featured non-commercial elements, such as awarding winners locally sourced agricultural products and integrating ethnic performances during halftime, including Dong grand songs and Miao lusheng dances.

The 2024 season introduced a two-phase format: a 162-match preliminary round (January–February) to select 20 finalists, followed by a finals stage (March–May). The 2025 season further diversified with events like the "40-Team Crossover Matches" and international friendlies. The number of teams expanded to 62 in 2024, with plans to increase to 108 teams in 2025, with external reinforcements to enhance competitiveness.

== Operational Mechanism ==
=== Amateur and Non-Profit Structure ===
All players are drawn from local professions such as farmers, construction workers, small business owners, and students. Professional athletes are barred from participating to preserve the league's grassroots ethos. Teams are self-funded through contributions from players and village collectives, with expenses typically covering uniforms, equipment, and basic field maintenance. Governance is decentralized, managed by elected village committees responsible for scheduling matches, drafting competition rules, and coordinating halftime cultural performances. For instance, the Sanbao Dong Village Committee oversees match logistics, while rotating volunteer groups handle refereeing and scorekeeping.

=== Government and Public Collaboration ===
Local authorities provide logistical support (e.g., free vendor stalls, security) but avoid direct intervention to preserve the league's organic character. The Rongjiang County government allocates resources for infrastructure, such as temporary seating, sanitation facilities, and security personnel during matches, but refrains from influencing operational decisions. An initiative is the provision of free vendor stalls to local entrepreneurs during games, where farmers sell agricultural products like wax-dyed textiles and cured meats directly to spectators.

Public engagement is amplified through decentralized media exposure: over 12,000 verified social media accounts and 2,200 volunteer livestream teams broadcast matches on platforms like Douyin (TikTok) and Kuaishou. These teams, often comprising villagers trained in basic videography, use handheld devices to capture and disseminate content. In 2023, livestreams accumulated 48 billion views, driven by hashtag campaigns such as #VillageSuperLeague and #FootballWithPorkPrize.

== Impacts ==
In 2023, Cun Chao drew 7.66 million tourists, generating ¥8.4 billion in tourism revenue and creating 3,000+ local jobs. By 2025, cumulative tourist visits exceeded 17 million, generating over ¥200 billion in tourism revenue. During the 2024 Spring Festival alone, the county attracted 151,200 visitors, yielding ¥170 million in income. The league popularized ethnic traditions, such as Dong folk songs and Miao dances during halftime shows, enhancing cultural pride. Events like the "Discover China's Beauty: Meet Guizhou Cun Chao" international friendly (2024) highlighted cross-cultural exchanges with diplomats and foreign teams. The league fostered unity, with villagers collaborating on dance rehearsals and event planning. As one resident noted, "Neighbors who once quarreled now work together for their teams".

The league spurred new businesses, including 4193 new market entities (e.g., food stalls, handicraft shops) and 358 hotels (10,845 beds). Non-agricultural income for villagers rose significantly, with wax-dyeing artisans like Pan Laola doubling their earnings to ¥120,000 annually. Leveraging live-streaming, local farmers and artisans achieved ¥200 million in online retail sales in 2024, an 87% year-on-year increase. Platforms like "Cun Chao E-Shop" promoted regional specialties like Tianma (a medicinal herb) and wax-dyed textiles. Initiatives like "Cun Chao Village Fairs" integrated football with rural markets, boosting local commerce. For example, a 2024 fair in Zhongcheng Village saw a vendor sell ¥30,000 worth of sausages in three days.

In 2023, Cun Chao signed a strategic pact with the English Premier League, launching training programs like the "Learn with Premier League" grassroots coaching initiative. By 2025, international friendlies involved teams from France, Hong Kong, Liberia, Brazil and Benin. Cun Chao's model has been replicated internationally in Benin and South Africa, where local "African Village Super Leagues" emerged. Plans include hosting a "Cun Chao World Cup" in 2028 and constructing a football-themed cultural town, positioning Rongjiang as a hub for global sports tourism.
