= Ciba cake =

Traditional Chinese snack

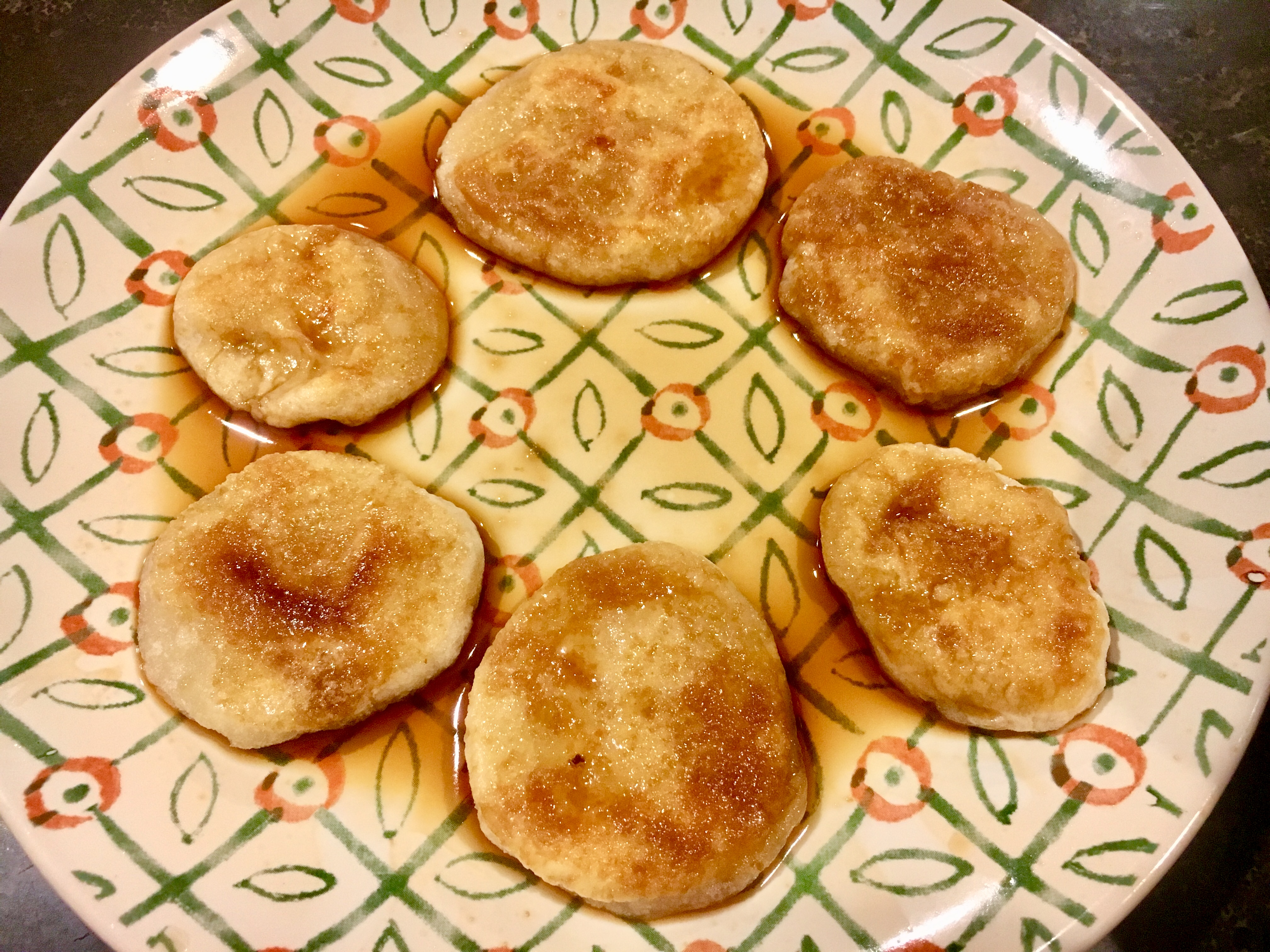
Homemade cibai cake

Cibai (Chinese: 糍粑; pinyin: cíbā; "ba" means cake), also known as nianba ("nian" means New Year), is a traditional Chinese snack made of glutinous rice pounded into paste. It is often molded into shapes of balls or cuboids. Cibai is often fried or steamed before being served.

== Popularity ==
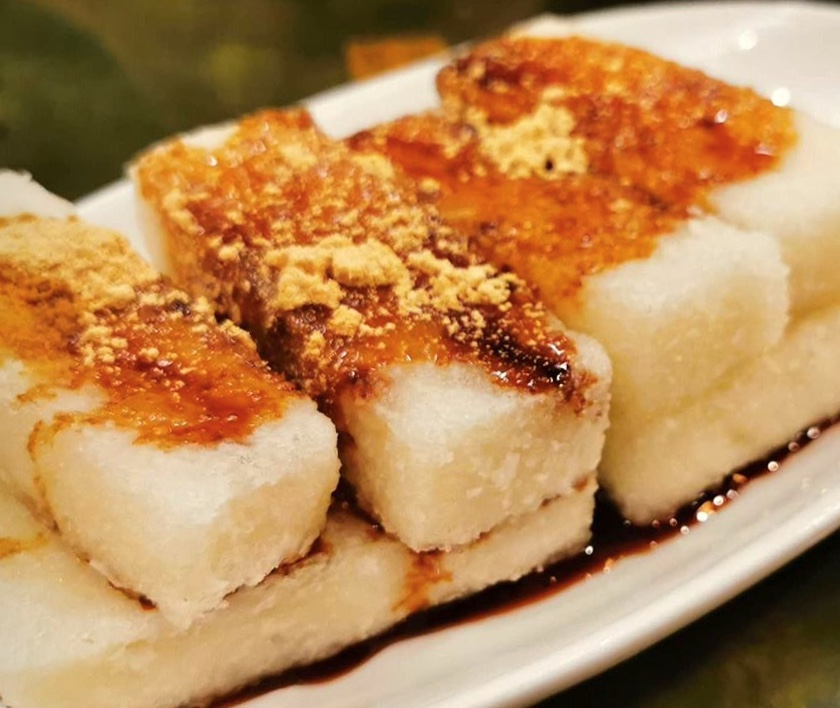
Cibai cake with brown sugar and roasted soybean flour

Cibai is mostly popular in southern China areas including Chongqing municipality, Guangdong province, Guangxi Zhuang autonomous region, Guizhou province, Sichuan province, Hunan province and Hubei province.

There is also similar food in Vietnam, Japan, Korea and other countries, but preparation and eating methods are slightly different.

== How to eat ==
People usually dip cibai in brown sugar syrup and roasted soybean flour before eating. Eating methods vary depending on different regions and cultures. In Chongqing municipality, people like to order cibai as a snack when they eat Chongqing hot pot.

== When to eat ==
Traditionally, cibai is often served at Chinese festivals, especially Spring Festival. People also eat Ciba during family celebrations to share their joy and delight of festival.

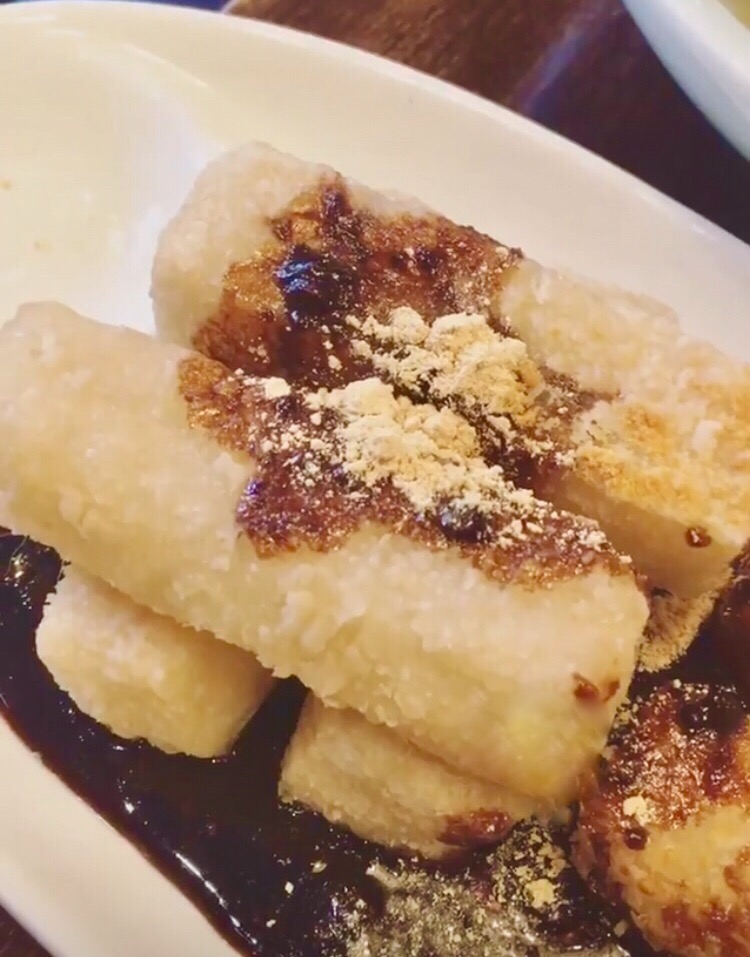
Cibai cake with brown sugar and roasted soybean flour

== Significance ==
Cibai is glutinous and sticky, embodying Chinese people's attitude on kinship and friendship to stay close to each other. Some ciba cakes are round, meaning reunion in Chinese. During festivals, people usually make many cibai cakes, which requires the cooperation of many people from a big family or several families. Therefore, cibai cakes often represent family reunion and good luck at Chinese New Year.

== Special activity – pounding cibai ==
Traditionally, people put cooked glutinous rice into a wooden or stone mortar and use large wooden pestles to pound. People use wooden or stone materials because glutinous rice will not stick to them. Usually, two people take turns to use large wooden pestles to pound rice in the mortar for around 30 minutes, and they add some water in mortar occasionally. People will then shape glutinous rice by hand and cook it. In places such as Ciqikou in Chongqing municipality, there are still people pounding Cibai in street shops.

== Common ingredients ==
Basic ingredients

- Water
- Glutinous rice flour

People can also add

- Peanut
- Sesame seeds
- Sugar
- Brown sugar
- Osmanthus fragrans (桂花)
- Honey

== Gallery ==
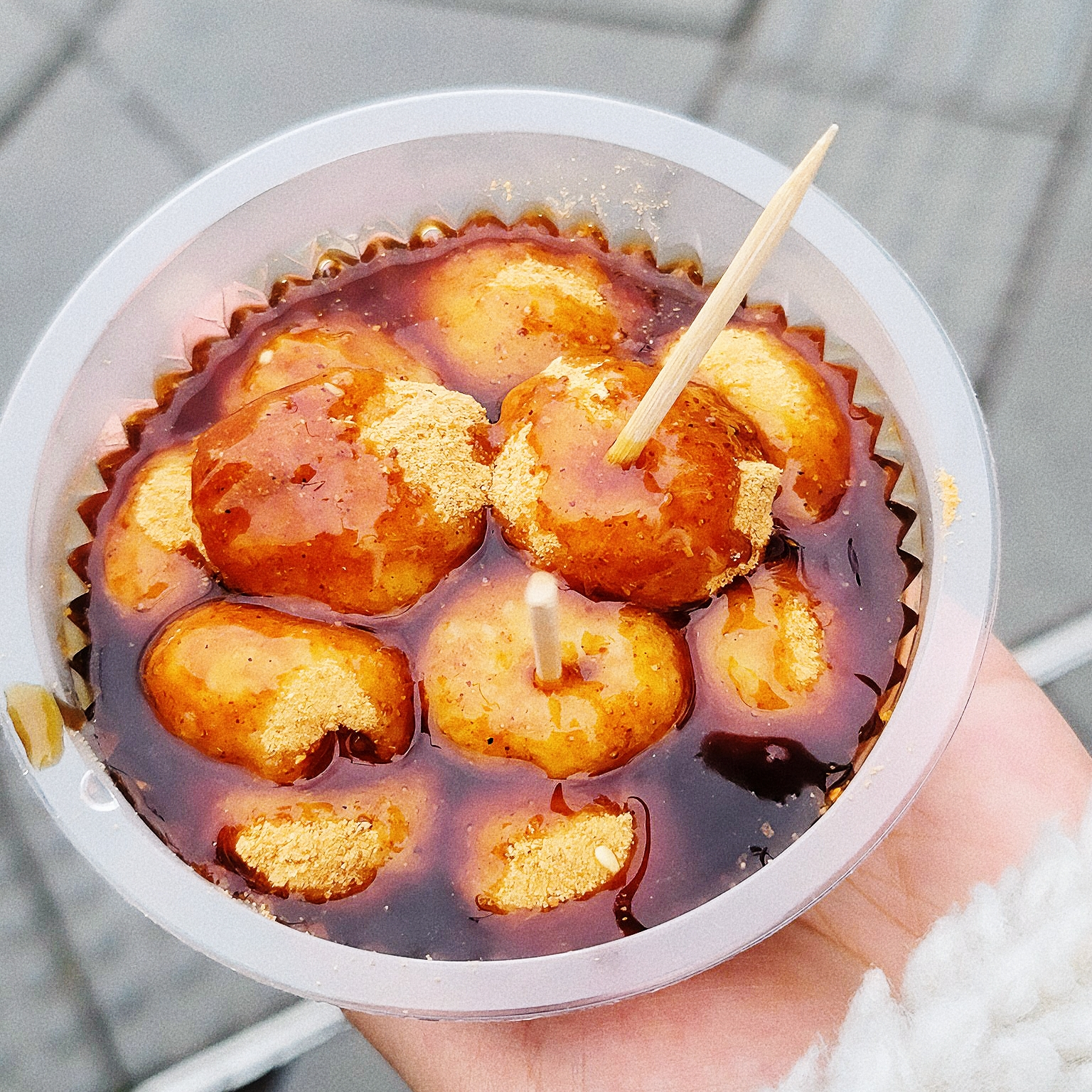
The most common type of Cibai found on the streets of Chengdu

== Related dishes ==
- Bánh giầy
- Mochi
- Mochi ice cream
- Rice cake
- Gyeongdan
- Osmanthus cake
- Qingtuan
