= Tahchin =

Iranian rice dish

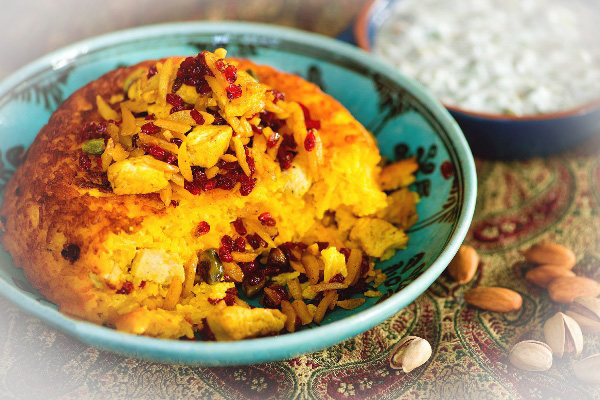
- Alternative names: Tahcheen, tah-chin
- Type: Rice dish
- Place of origin: Iran (Persia)
- Region or state: Semnan, Tehran, Fars
- Main ingredients: Rice, chicken fillet, yogurt, saffron, egg

Tahchin or tahcheen (Persian: ته‌چین) is an Iranian rice dish primarily consisting of rice, yogurt, eggs, saffron, and various types of meat.

Tahchin translates from Persian as "arranged on the bottom". Tahchin generally consists of two parts: the first part is a thick, saffron-flavored crust called tahdig, often mixed with cooked red meat or chicken; the second part is plain rice that is layered on top of this crust. However, the plain rice layer can be omitted, resulting in a molded tahchin.

== Cooking ==
To prepare tahchin, the rice is first boiled and drained. In a separate bowl, eggs are beaten and mixed with yogurt, a little water, and salt. A saffron solution is added to this mixture. About half of the drained rice is mixed with this sauce and then placed in a pot with hot oil at the bottom, where prepared chicken or red meat is layered on top; the remaining rice is then poured over the ingredients and left to steam.

For preparing the chicken or red meat in tahchin, ingredients like onion, carrot, turmeric, bay leaves, parsley, celery, tarragon, savory, and others are used.

The way tahchin is served involves first placing plain rice in a dish, then adding chicken, or any other prepared meat, on top, and then more plain rice is added. The tahchin, which is about 2-3 fingers thick, is then cut and placed on top. Due to the eggs and yogurt, tahchin is usually richer in oil, which often settles at the bottom of the dish.

== Varieties ==
Besides chicken and meat, tahchin can also be made with eggplant, spinach, and green beans. For example, Ali Akbar Khan Ashpazbashi, a chef in the Qajar royal court, described the preparation of spinach tahchin as follows: "Wash, chop, and drain the spinach; if desired, add dried plums or barberry or ground sour grapes under the rice crust, after placing a spoonful of pilaf. The plums and barberry are added separately to the Tahchin." In this tahchin, you can also use pomegranate paste or deseeded barberry instead of dried plums.

The meat used for meat tahchin is usually shoulder or breast. People in Sirjan use rib and chest meat of lamb, referred to in their dialect as "dem shaleh meat". To prepare the meat, it is cooked with water, onions, and salt, and after cooling, it is mixed with yogurt and saffron and left in a cool place overnight before cooking.

The nomadic Basseri tribe uses lamb or kid meat, or a hybrid, for meat tahchin, seasoning the meat with caraway. If instead of lamb or kid, game meat is used, it is pounded and placed between layers of rice. If the head of the lamb or kid is included in the pilaf pot, it is called kalle pache. If poultry such as chicken or partridge is used, the dish is known as chicken or partridge tahchin.

In some regions, tahchin is a ceremonial dish. In Sangesar, women prepare "Nouroei Tam" or "Plow Nowruz" for Nowruz. A characteristic of this pilaf, considered a type of tahchin, is the abundance of plums and whole spinach in it. On the day of Nowruz, a plate of this pilaf is served to guests, who are expected to consume at least some of it to show respect to the host, along with other local dairy products and fruits. Preparing this special pilaf is one of the main duties of Sangesar women on Nowruz, and they wake up early in the morning to prepare it, considering the number of potential guests.

Among the travel customs that the people of Shahrud observe is preparing bean tahchin on the first night of a journey. They distribute this tahchin among relatives and friends, often accompanied by the phrase "Ash-e Lobia, zoodi bia" (Bean stew, come back soon).

In the past, Tehranis would prepare different dishes for Suhoor based on the weather; hearty, meat-rich dishes for cold days, and lighter, low-fat dishes for summer. Pilaf tahchin with red meat or chicken was among the dishes prepared for Suhoor in the cold, using ample amounts of the best animal oils.

== Types ==
Tahchin can be cooked in various ways such as:

- Chicken tahchin (Persian: ته‌چینِ مرغ, romanized: Tahchin-e Morgh)
- Meat tahchin Persian: ته‌چینِ گوشت, romanized: Tahchin-e Goosht
- Eggplant tahchin (Persian: ته‌چینِ بادنجان, romanized: Tahchin-e Badenjan)
- Spinach tahchin (Persian: ته‌چینِ اسفناج, romanized: Tahchin-e Esfenaj)

Tahchin is usually cooked either in a dutch oven style pot, or a glass baking dish and can be cooked either in the oven or on the stove.
