= Rongjiang County =

Rongjiang County 榕江县 Jungkiang
- County
- Location of the seat in Guizhou Rongjiang (Southwest China)
- Coordinates (Rongjiang County government): 25°55′55″N 108°31′19″E
- Country: China
- Province: Guizhou
- Autonomous prefecture: Qiandongnan
- Township-level divisions: 9 towns; 4 townships; 6 Ethnic townships
- County seat: Guzhou Town

Area
  - Total: 3,315.8 km^{2} (1,280.2 sq mi)

Population (2020)
  - Total: 297,572
  - Density: 89.744/km^{2} (232.43/sq mi)
- Time zone: UTC+8 (China Standard)
- Postal code: 557200
- Area code: 0855
- Website: www.rongjiang.gov.cn

Rongjiang County (simplified Chinese: 榕江县; traditional Chinese: 榕江縣; pinyin: Róngjiāng Xiàn) is a county in southeastern Guizhou province, China. It is under the administration of the Qiandongnan Miao and Dong Autonomous Prefecture.

== Administrative divisions ==
Rongjiang County is divided into 9 towns, 4 townships and 6 ethnic townships. Guzhou Town is the county seat which houses the Rongjiang County Government and Rongjiang County Council.

Towns

- Guzhou Town (古州镇)
- Zhongcheng Town (忠诚镇)
- Zhaihao Town (寨蒿镇)
- Pingyong Town (平永镇)
- Leli Town (乐里镇)
- Langdong Town (朗洞镇)
- Zaima Town (栽麻镇)
- Pingjiang Town (平江镇)
- Bakai Town (八开镇)

Townships

- Congyi Township (崇义乡)
- Pingyang Township (平阳乡)
- Liangwang Township (两汪乡)
- Jihua Township (计划乡)

Ethnic Townships

- Renli Shui Ethnic Township (仁里水族乡)
- Sanjiang Shui Ethnic Township (三江水族乡)
- Dingwei Shui Ethnic Township (定威水族乡)
- Xinghua Shui Ethnic Township (兴华水族乡)
- Shuiwei Shui Ethnic Township (水尾水族乡)
- Tashi Yao and Shui Ethnic Township (塔石瑶族水族乡)

== Climate ==
Climate data for Rongjiang, elevation 286 m (938 ft), (1991–2020 normals, extremes 1981–2010)
Month	Jan	Feb	Mar	Apr	May	Jun	Jul	Aug	Sep	Oct	Nov	Dec	Year
Record high °C (°F)	26.7 (80.1)	32.9 (91.2)	35.4 (95.7)	36.3 (97.3)	37.6 (99.7)	38.4 (101.1)	40.2 (104.4)	39.5 (103.1)	38.9 (102.0)	36.7 (98.1)	32.1 (89.8)	28.5 (83.3)	40.2 (104.4)
Mean daily maximum °C (°F)	11.7 (53.1)	15.1 (59.2)	19.0 (66.2)	24.8 (76.6)	28.5 (83.3)	30.8 (87.4)	32.9 (91.2)	33.2 (91.8)	30.5 (86.9)	25.1 (77.2)	20.3 (68.5)	14.7 (58.5)	23.9 (75.0)
Daily mean °C (°F)	8.0 (46.4)	10.5 (50.9)	14.1 (57.4)	19.4 (66.9)	23.0 (73.4)	25.7 (78.3)	27.3 (81.1)	27.0 (80.6)	24.3 (75.7)	19.7 (67.5)	14.9 (58.8)	9.9 (49.8)	18.7 (65.6)
Mean daily minimum °C (°F)	5.7 (42.3)	7.7 (45.9)	11.1 (52.0)	15.8 (60.4)	19.6 (67.3)	22.7 (72.9)	23.9 (75.0)	23.5 (74.3)	20.8 (69.4)	16.6 (61.9)	11.9 (53.4)	7.1 (44.8)	15.5 (60.0)
Record low °C (°F)	−2.3 (27.9)	−3.5 (25.7)	0.4 (32.7)	5.1 (41.2)	9.1 (48.4)	14.0 (57.2)	17.6 (63.7)	18.3 (64.9)	12.6 (54.7)	5.7 (42.3)	0.9 (33.6)	−3.3 (26.1)	−3.5 (25.7)
Average precipitation mm (inches)	39.5 (1.56)	40.0 (1.57)	76.5 (3.01)	101.8 (4.01)	200.8 (7.91)	238.3 (9.38)	178.9 (7.04)	128.7 (5.07)	86.7 (3.41)	78.2 (3.08)	47.2 (1.86)	31.1 (1.22)	1,247.7 (49.12)
Average precipitation days (≥ 0.1 mm)	13.4	11.4	15.6	15.5	16.5	16.9	15.0	12.7	10.0	10.5	9.1	9.7	156.3
Average snowy days	2.0	1.1	0.2	0	0	0	0	0	0	0	0.1	0.8	4.2
Average relative humidity (%)	80	77	79	79	81	84	82	81	80	81	80	78	80
Mean monthly sunshine hours	36.2	50.2	64.5	90.2	110.3	100.1	152.8	169.5	130.5	95.6	83.4	68.1	1,151.4
Percentage possible sunshine	11	16	17	24	27	24	37	42	36	27	26	21	26
Source: China Meteorological Administration

== Sport ==
In 2024, Rongjiang County became famous for its popular football league - The Village Super League.

== Transportation ==
=== Road ===
- S308, S202, S222, S221

=== Expressway ===
- G76
- Yanhe–Rongjiang Expressway
- Libo–Rongjiang Expressway

=== Railway ===
- Guiyang–Guangzhou High-Speed Railway-Rongjiang Railway Station
- Xingyi-Yongzhou Railway
