= Osmanthus cake =

Chinese pastry

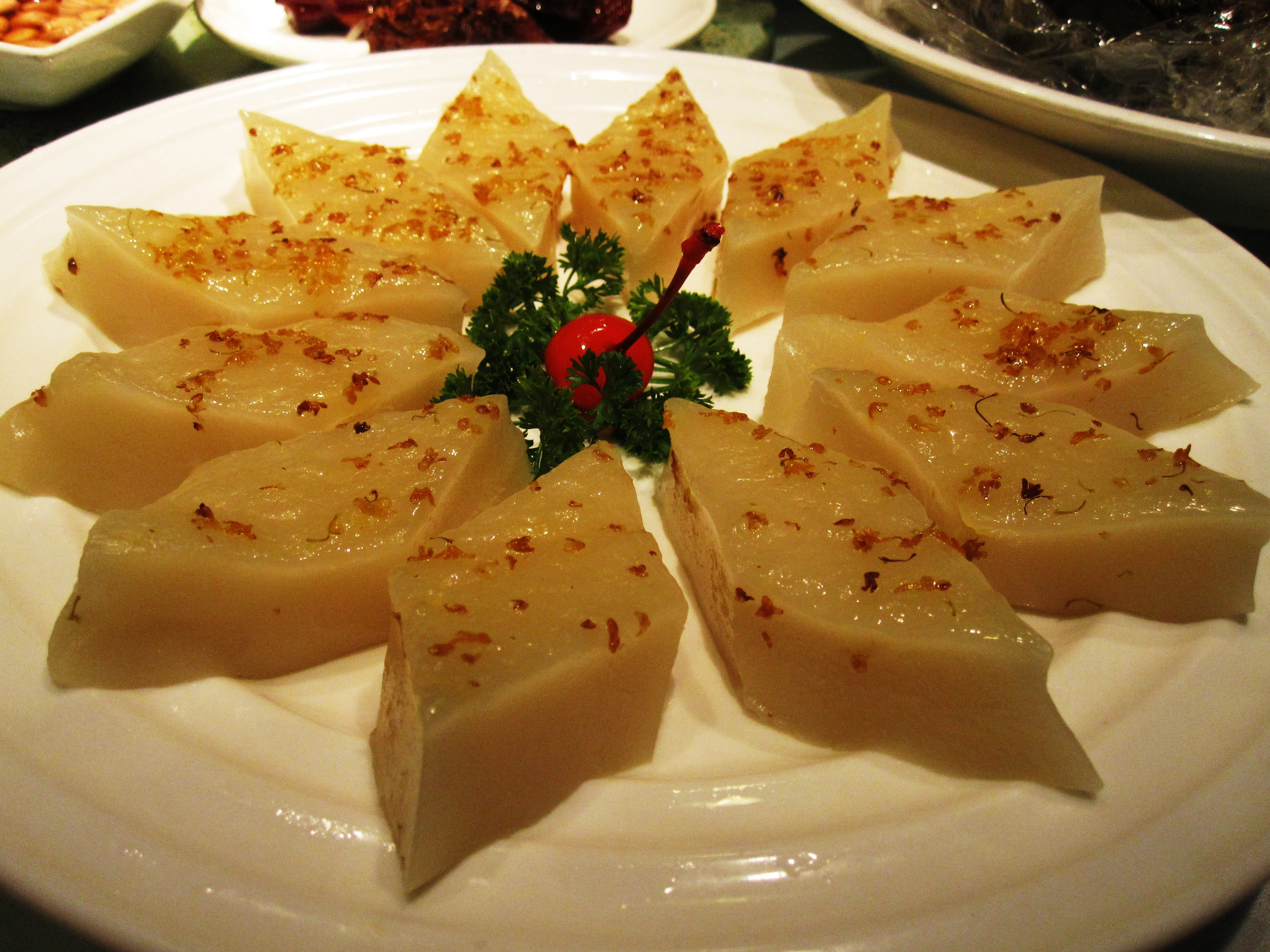
Osmanthus cake

Osmanthus cake (Chinese: 桂花糕; pinyin: guì huā gāo) is a traditional sweet-scented Chinese pastry made with glutinous rice flour, honey, sweet osmanthus and rock sugar. It has crystal-clear appearance and a soft, slightly waxy texture.

== History ==
Sweet-scented osmanthus cake originated in China during the Ming Dynasty. Though its exact origin is unclear, folk tales have it that the poet Yang Shen dreamed of visiting the moon in order to take the imperial exam. In the dream, he saw a magnificent palace and a huge and sweet-smelling osmanthus plant. He picked it and brought it back to Earth. Toward the end of the Ming Dynasty, a peddler from Xindu named Liu Jixiang was inspired by this story to collect fresh osmanthus flowers. He extracted their essential oils, strained them over sugar and mixed them with glutinous rice to produce the familiar form of the sweet we know today. It is now a Xindu specialty.

== See also ==
- List of pastries
- Dim sum
- Chinese desserts
