= Num plae ai =

Cambodian sticky rice cake

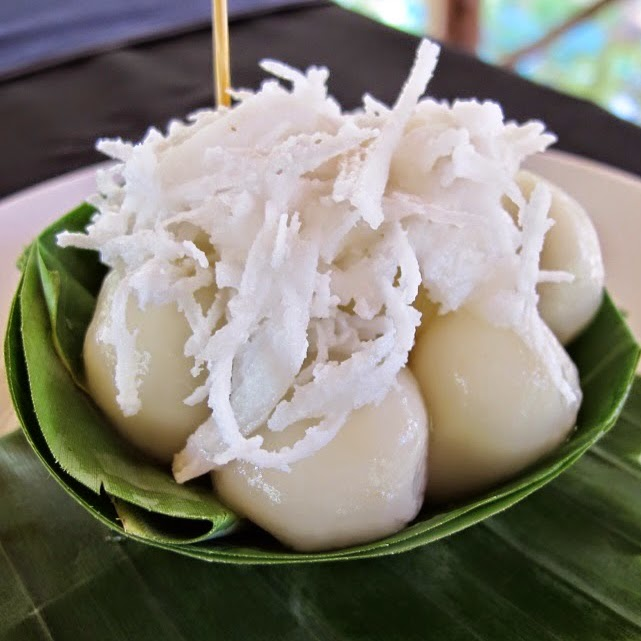
- Num plae ai in a banana leaf bowl
- Alternative names: num plae ai, num plae aiy, num plae ay, nom plae ay, nom plaiy aiy, nom plai ai
- Type: Rice cakes
- Place of origin: Cambodia
- Region or state: Southeast Asia
- Main ingredients: glutinous rice flour, palm sugar, grated coconut
- Ingredients generally used: dry roasted sesame seeds, pandan leaf juice, coconut milk
- Similar dishes: klepon, khanom kho

Num plae ai (Khmer: នំផ្លែអាយ) is a Cambodian rice cake made from glutinous rice flour filled with palm sugar and garnished with grated coconut.

== Etymology ==
In Khmer, the term num (នំ) refers to cakes, cookies, or many desserts in general, while the word plae (ផ្លែ) means "fruit". English translations of num plae ai include "rice sugar pearls", "sweet rice dumplings" and "cakes of forgiveness".

== Preparation and variations ==
The exterior of num plae ai is prepared by combining glutinous rice flour with salt and warm water, then kneading the mixture into a dough. The dough is shaped into small discs, each with a piece of palm sugar in the middle of it, which is then wrapped into the dough disc, sealed, and rolled into a ball. These balls are boiled in water, cooled, and finally garnished with grated coconut before serving. Traditionally, num plae ai are served in small bowls made out of banana leaves.

A garnish of dry roasted, lightly pounded sesame seeds mixed with grated coconut is also common. In some variations, pandan leaf juice and coconut milk are incorporated into the dough, while grated coconut may be blended with the palm sugar to form the filling.
