= Munthiri kothu =

Indian dessert

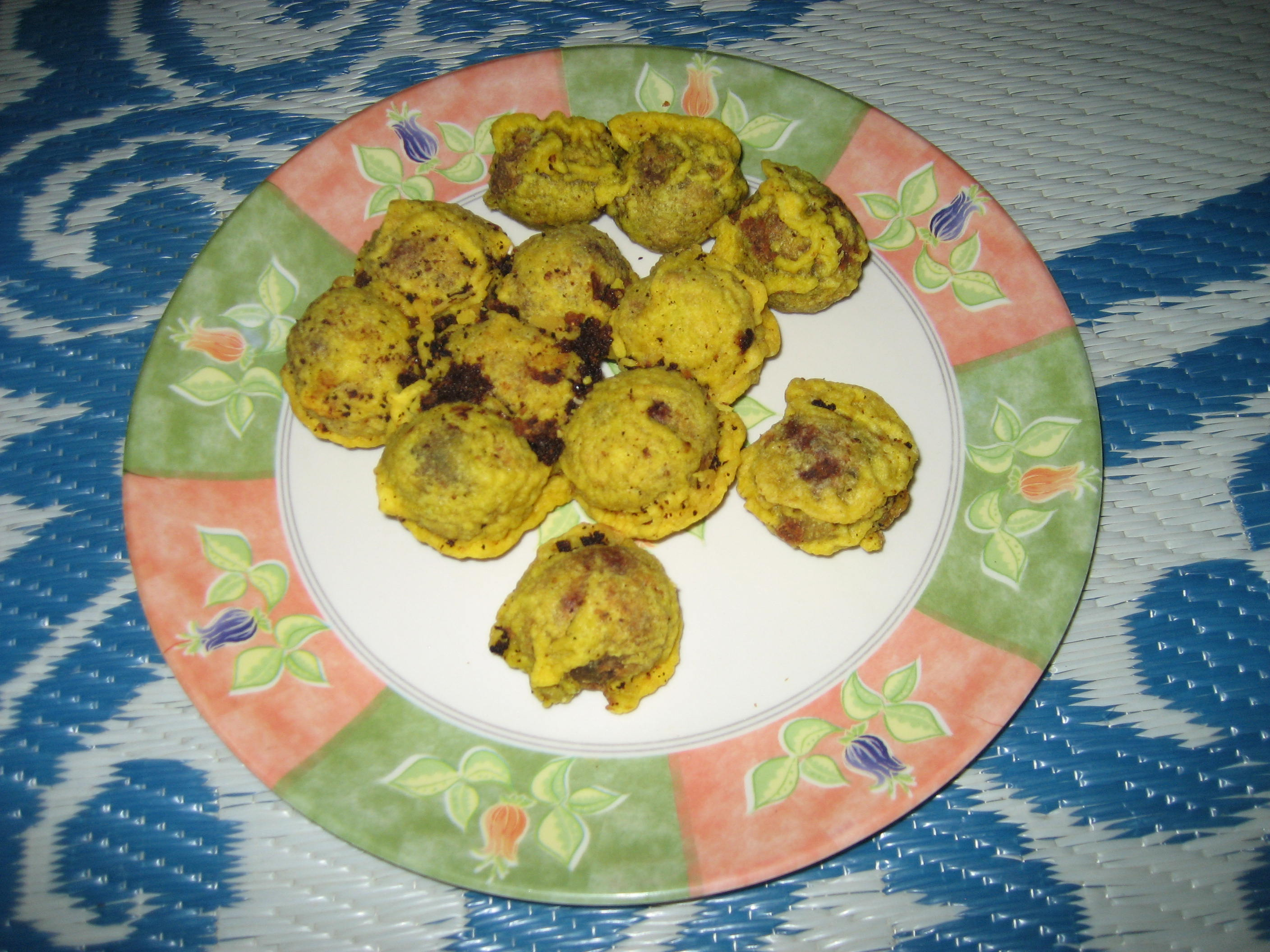
- Munthiri kothu
- Alternative names: Payatham urundai
- Place of origin: India, Sri Lanka
- Region or state: Kanyakumari District, Jaffna District

Munthiri kothu (Tamil: முந்திரி கொத்து) is a unique festival sweet from Kanyakumari District, Tamil Nadu, South India. It is also known as payatham urundai (Tamil: பயத்தம் உருண்டை) in Sri Lanka.

To prepare it, dhall (mung bean or moong dal) is roasted in a karahi/kadai in coconut or sesame oil. This is then cooled and crushed into a fine powder. Sesame seeds and coconut flakes are similarly and separately roasted and powdered. These powders are then combined with cardamom and jaggery syrup. This is then split into marble-sized balls.

A batter made from maida flour, rice powder, turmeric, and salt is prepared by gradually adding water to avoid lump formation. A kadai filled with coconut oil is then heated, and golf-ball-sized fritters are deep-fried until golden. The dish derives its name from the traditional method of dropping the fritters into the oil in groups of three, with munthiri kothu meaning "a bunch of three".
