= Buah melaka =

Buah melaka may refer to:

- Klepon, a boiled rice cake stuffed with palm sugar
- Phyllanthus emblica, also known as the Indian gooseberry or Malacca fruit
