= Khanom kho =

Thai dessert

Khanom tom
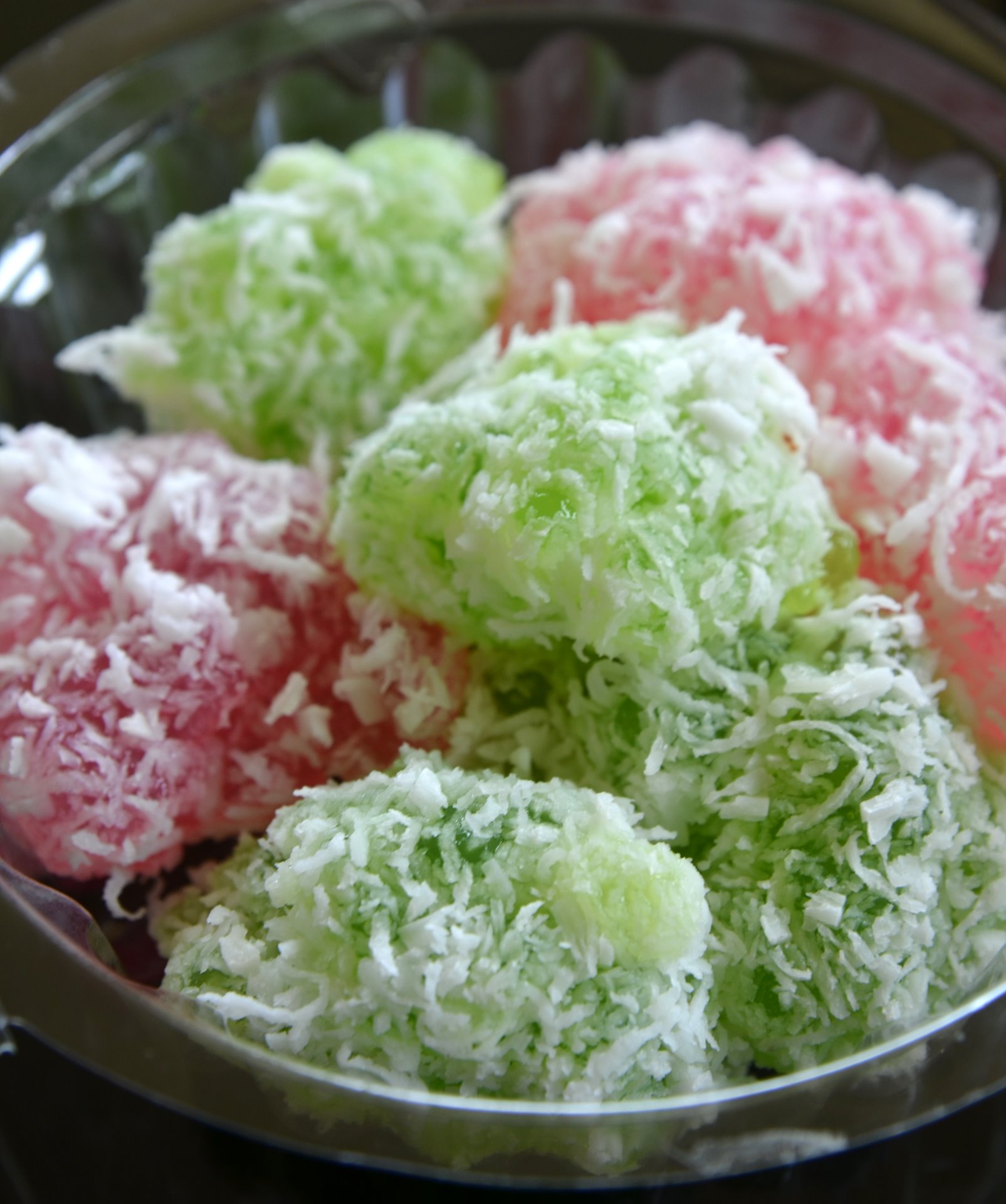
- Alternative names: Khanom kho
- Type: Dessert
- Place of origin: Thailand
- Associated cuisine: Thai
- Main ingredients: Glutinous rice flour; jaggery; shredded coconut
- Similar dishes: Modak, kuih kochi, tang guozi, nom plae ai, yomari, kangidan, klepon

Khanom tom (Thai: ขนมต้ม, pronounced [kʰā.nǒm tôm]) and khanom kho (ขนมโค, [kʰā.nǒm kʰōː]) are closely related traditional Thai desserts. Khanom tom is used in Central Thailand, while khanom kho comes from Southern Thailand. Khanom kho are boiled glutinous rice dumplings stuffed with a palmyra palm sugar cube and rolled in shredded coconut, while khanom tom have caramelized shredded coconut fillings. They are approximately the size of large gumballs and come in different colors, typically red, green, blue, purple, or off-white (sans food coloring). They are sometimes served in a bath of warm coconut milk. Khanom kho are sold in markets, food stalls, and restaurants and made in homes throughout Southern Thailand. They are served at ceremonies, festivals, parties, and weddings.

== Taste ==
Lonely Planet describes the taste of khanom kho as follows:

The outer coating of grated coconut is rich and oily, and so fresh it has a natural crispness to it. The wrapping, made of just water and sticky rice flour, is soft and slightly sticky. The sweetness of khanom kho comes only from the inside, where a piece of palmyra palm sugar is planted, and provides a nutty caramel flavour and a little crunch. A hint of saltiness added to the outer shreds of coconut, enhances the flavour of the sweet core.

== Ingredients ==
Khanom kho are made from glutinous rice flour, palmyra palm sugar, grated coconut, salt, butterfly pea flowers or purple food coloring, and pandan leaves for coloring.

== Similar desserts ==
Khanom tom and khanom kho are two of many steamed or fried sweet flour dumplings found across Asia. These include the modak from India, kuih kochi from Malaysia, Guo Zi from China, num plae ai from Cambodia, yomari from Nepal, klepon from Indonesia, and kangidan from Japan.

== See also ==
- Thai cuisine
- List of Thai desserts
- Modak
- Kuih kochi
- Guo zi
- Yomari
