= Uses of the coconut palm =

The coconut palm has a wide range of practical uses, from food to fuel, fibre, timber, and fodder for livestock.

Foods made from coconut include coconut meat, the white fleshy endosperm of the fruit; coconut milk, used for cooking; coconut water, and vinegar fermented from it; heart of palm, the apical buds, only obtainable by killing the tree; toddy, the sap of the tree; coconut oil, used in cooking; and coconut butter, a solidified form of the oil.

== Uses ==
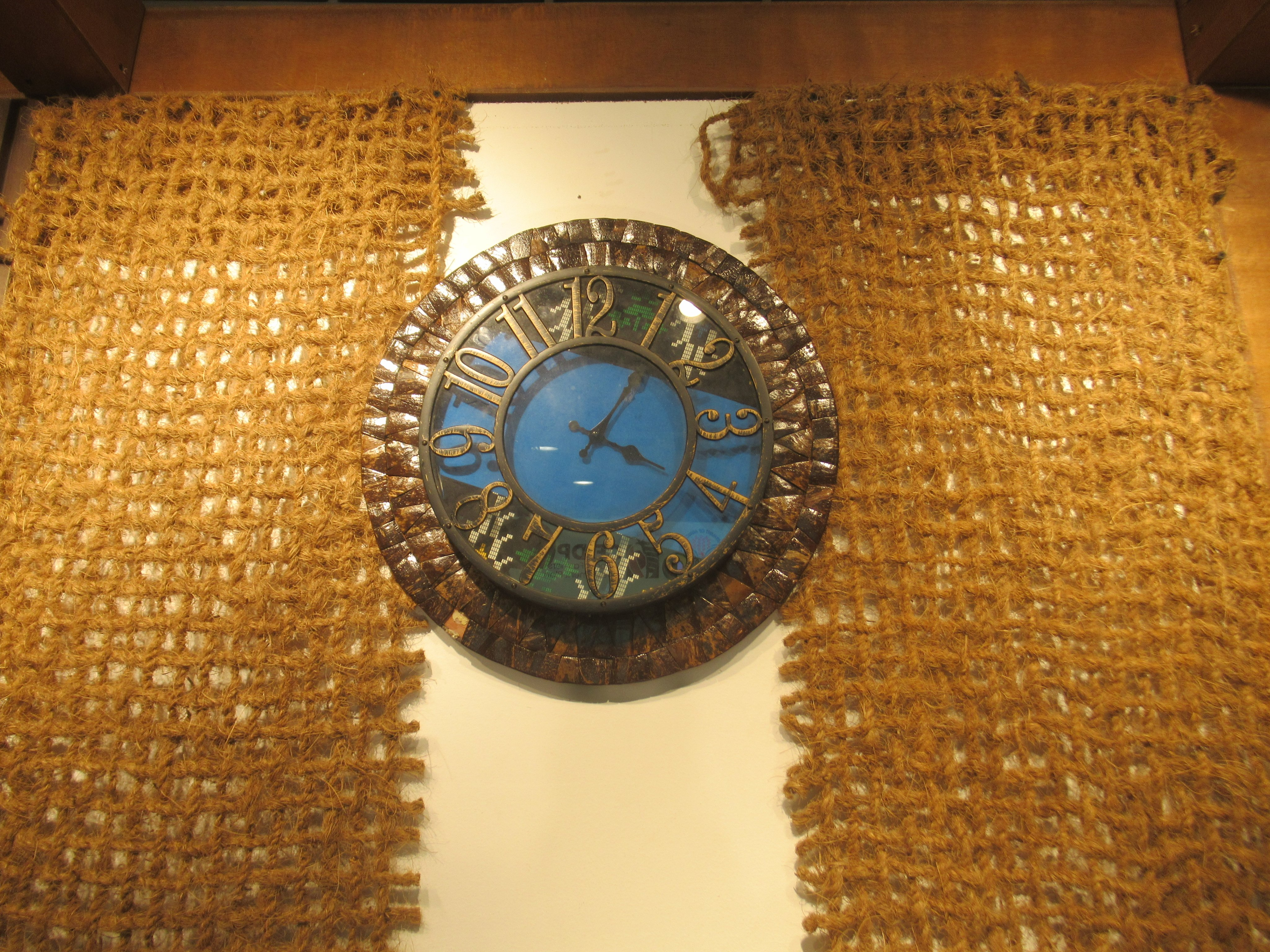
Coconut wall clock and coir

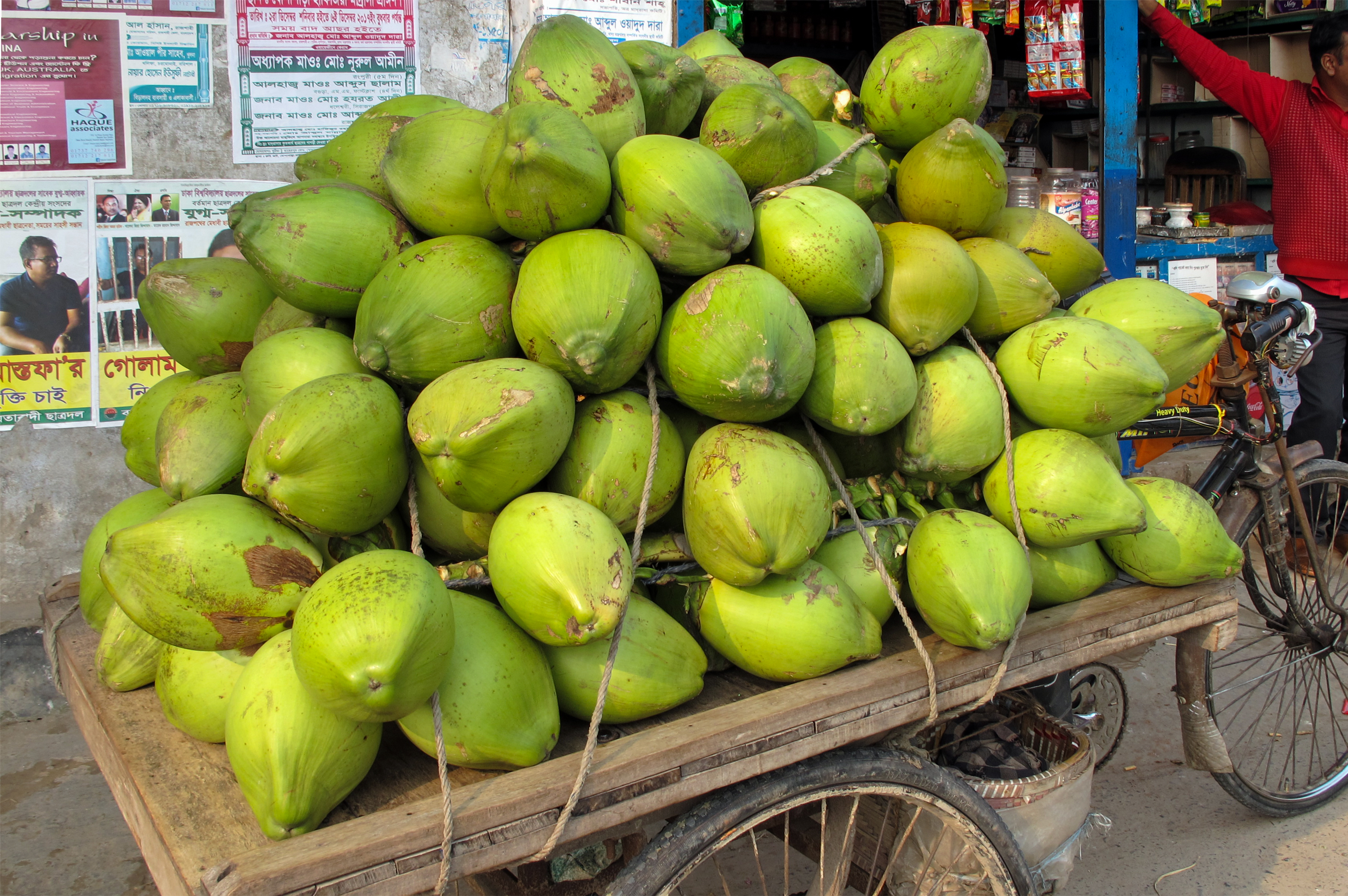
Immature green coconuts sold in Bangladesh for coconut water and their soft jelly-like flesh

The coconut palm is grown throughout the tropics for decoration, as well as for its many culinary and nonculinary uses; virtually every part of the coconut palm can be used by humans in some manner and has significant economic value. Coconuts' versatility is sometimes noted in its naming. In Sanskrit, it is kalpa vriksha ("the tree which provides all the necessities of life"). In the Malay language, it is pokok seribu guna ("the tree of a thousand uses"). In the Philippines, the coconut is commonly called the "tree of life".

It is one of the most useful trees in the world.

=== Nutrition ===
Coconut meat, raw
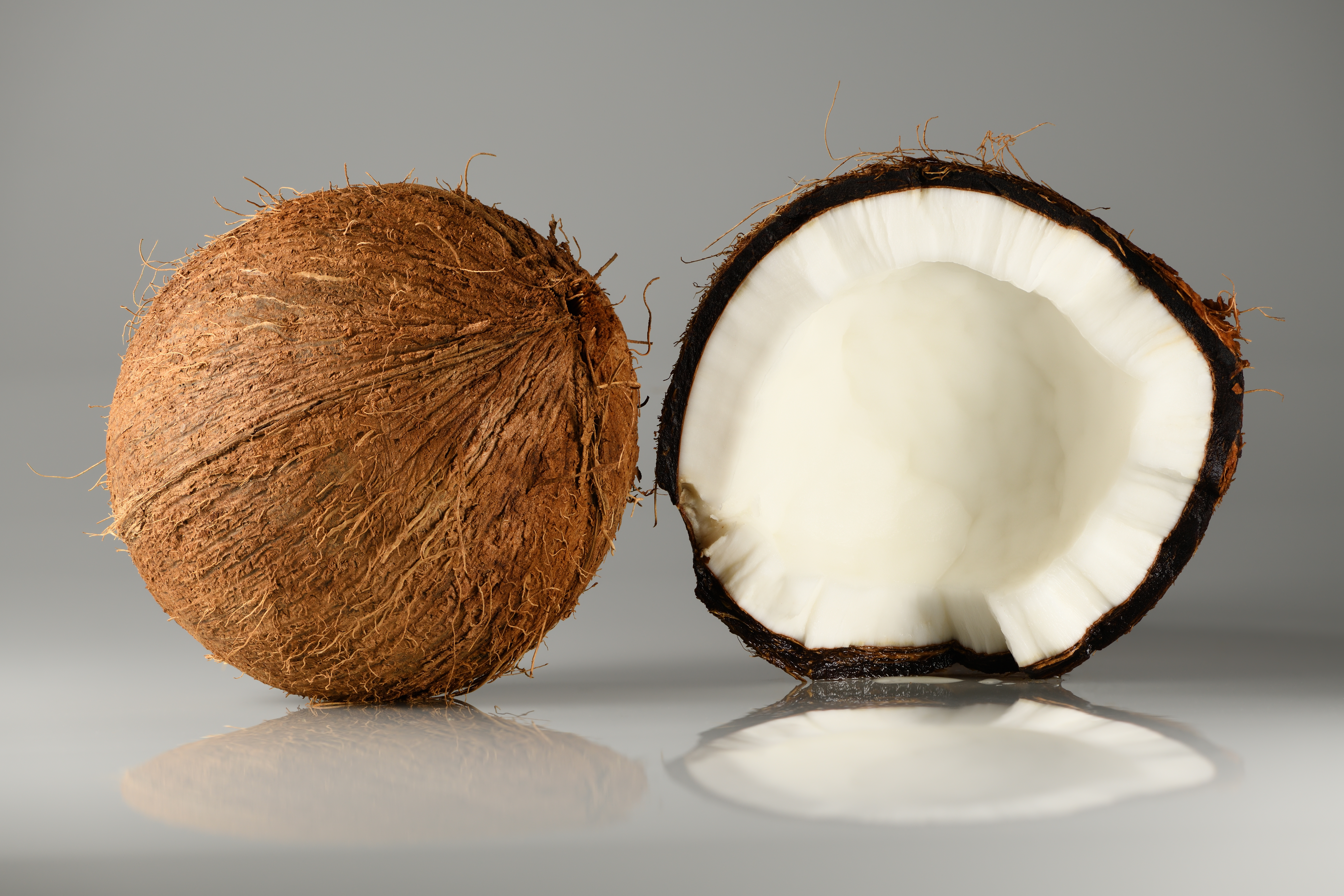

Nutritional value per 100 g (3.5 oz)
- Energy: 1,480 kJ (350 kcal)
- Carbohydrates: 15.23 g
- Sugars: 6.23 g
- Dietary fiber: 9.0 g
- Fat: 33.49 g
- Saturated: 29.698 g
- Monounsaturated: 1.425 g
- Polyunsaturated: 0.366 g
- Protein: 3.33 g
Amino acids
Tryptophan	0.039 g
Threonine	0.121 g
Isoleucine	0.131 g
Leucine	0.247 g
Lysine	0.147 g
Methionine	0.062 g
Cystine	0.066 g
Phenylalanine	0.169 g
Tyrosine	0.103 g
Valine	0.202 g
Arginine	0.546 g
Histidine	0.077 g
Alanine	0.170 g
Aspartic acid	0.325 g
Glutamic acid	0.761 g
Glycine	0.158 g
Proline	0.138 g
Serine	0.172 g
Vitamins and minerals
Vitamins	Quantity %DV^{†}
Thiamine (B1)	6% 0.066 mg
Riboflavin (B2)	2% 0.020 mg
Niacin (B3)	3% 0.540 mg
Pantothenic acid (B5)	6% 0.300 mg
Vitamin B6	3% 0.054 mg
Folate (B9)	7% 26 μg
Vitamin C	4% 3.3 mg
Vitamin E	2% 0.24 mg
Vitamin K	0% 0.2 μg
Minerals	Quantity %DV^{†}
Calcium	1% 14 mg
Copper	48% 0.435 mg
Iron	14% 2.43 mg
Magnesium	8% 32 mg
Manganese	65% 1.500 mg
Phosphorus	9% 113 mg
Potassium	12% 356 mg
Selenium	18% 10.1 μg
Sodium	1% 20 mg
Zinc	10% 1.10 mg
- Other constituents: Quantity
- Water: 47 g
- Link to USDA Database entry
- ^{†}Percentages estimated using US recommendations for adults, except for potassium, which is estimated based on expert recommendation from the National Academies.

A 100-gram (3 1/2-ounce) reference serving of raw coconut flesh supplies 1,480 kilojoules (354 kilocalories) of food energy and a high amount of total fat (33 grams), especially saturated fat (89% of total fat), along with a moderate quantity of carbohydrates (15g), and protein (3g). Micronutrients in significant content (more than 10% of the Daily Value) include the dietary minerals, manganese, copper, iron, phosphorus, selenium, and zinc (table).

=== Culinary ===
==== Coconut meat ====
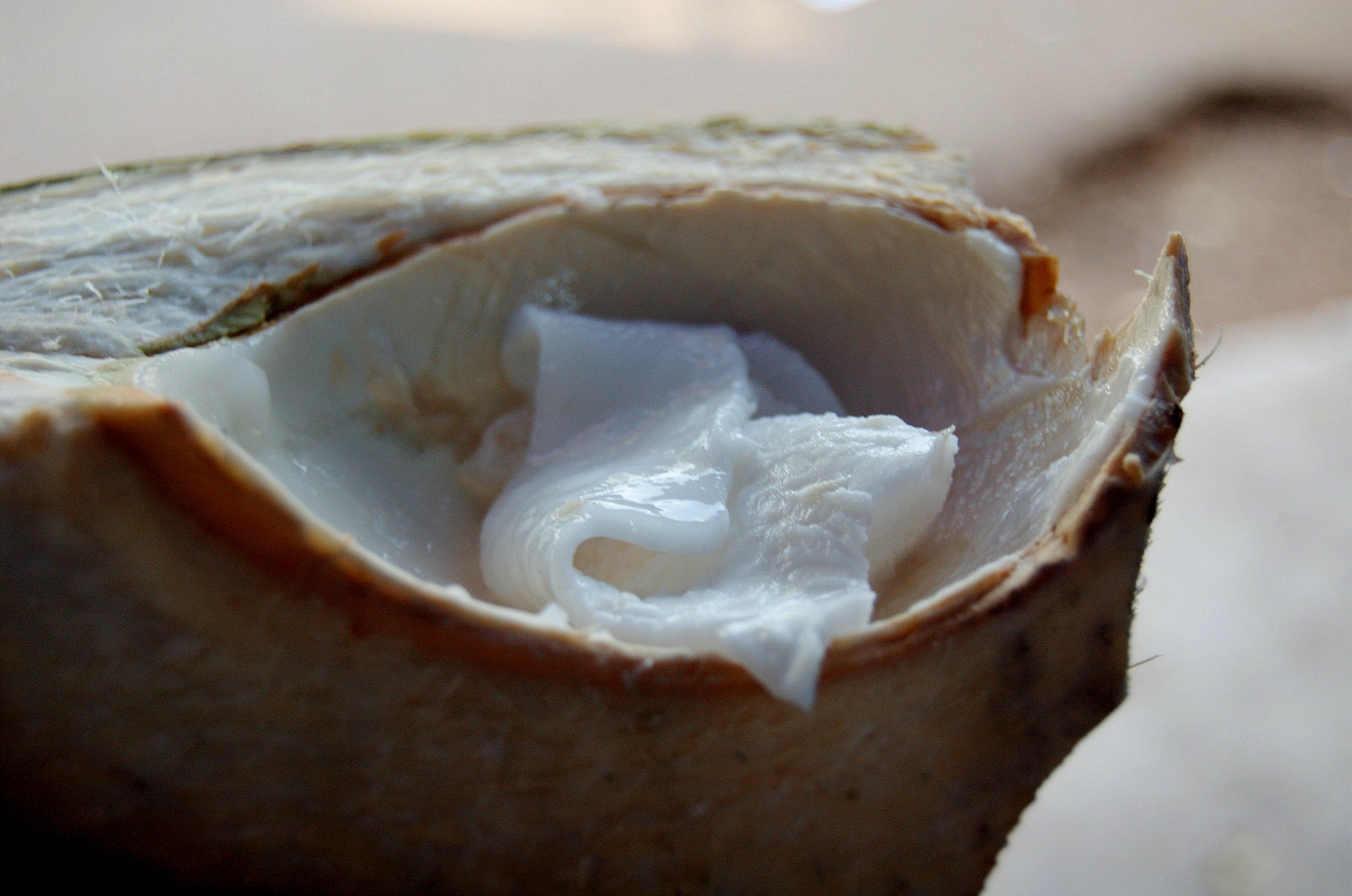
Soft immature coconut meat usually is eaten as is.

The edible white, fleshy part of the seed (the endosperm) is known as the "coconut meat", "coconut flesh", or "coconut kernel".

Maturity is difficult to assess on an unopened coconut, with no technically proven method. Younger coconuts tend to be smaller and have brighter colors. Younger coconuts give a "solid" sound when tapped, while mature onces produce a "hollow" sound. Immature coconuts produce a sloshing sound when shaken (the sharper the sound, the younger it is), while fully mature coconuts do not.

The meat of immature coconuts can be eaten as is or used in salads, drinks, desserts, and pastries such as buko pie and es kelapa muda. Because of their soft textures, they are unsuitable for grating. Mature coconut meat has a tough texture and thus is processed before consumption or made into copra. Freshly shredded mature coconut meat, known as "grated coconut", "shredded coconut", or "coconut flakes", is used in the extraction of coconut milk. It is used directly as a garnish for dishes likeklepon and puto bumbong, or cooked in sugar and eaten as the Philippines dessert bukayo. Coconut meat can be cut into larger pieces or strips, dried, and salted to make "coconut chips" or "coco chips". These can be toasted or baked to make bacon-like fixings.

Grated dehydrated coconut is called "desiccated coconut". It contains less than 3% of the original moisture content of coconut meat. It is predominantly used in the bakery and confectionery industries because of its longer shelf life.

A coconut flour has been developed for use in baking, to combat malnutrition.

==== Macapuno ====
A special cultivar of coconut known as macapuno produces a large amount of jelly-like coconut meat. Its meat fills the entire interior of the coconut shell, rather than just the inner surfaces. It was first developed for commercial cultivation in the Philippines and is used widely in Philippine cuisine for desserts, drinks, and pastries. It is also popular in Indonesia (where it is known as kopyor) for making beverages.

==== Coconut milk ====
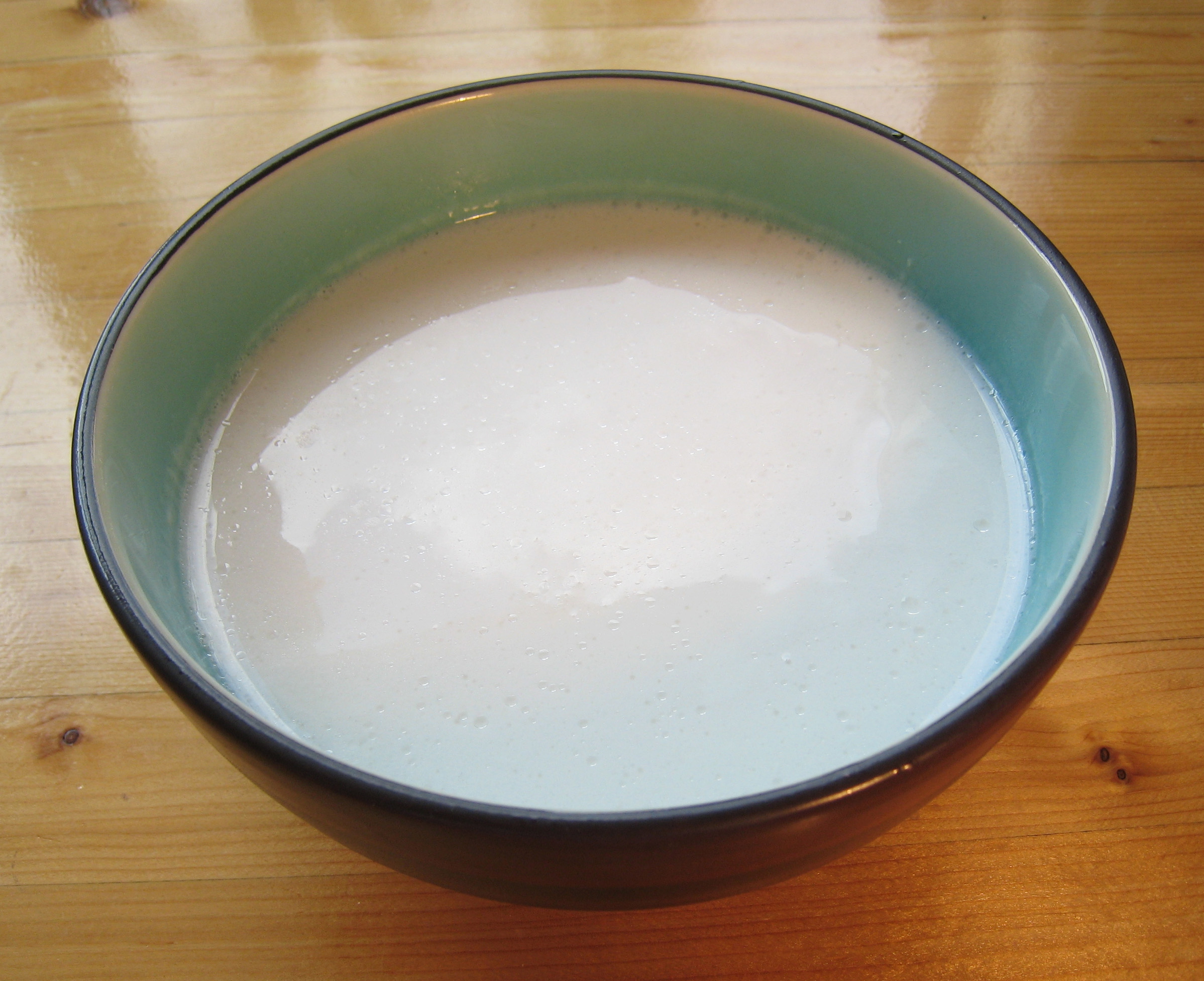
Coconut milk, a widely used ingredient in the cuisines of regions where coconuts are native

Coconut milk, used for cooking, not to be confused with coconut water, is obtained by pressing the grated coconut meat, usually with hot water added which extracts the coconut oil, proteins, and aromatic compounds. It contains 5% to 20% fat, while coconut cream contains around 20% to 50% fat. Most of the fat is saturated (89%), with lauric acid being the major fatty acid. Coconut milk can be diluted to create coconut milk beverages. These have a much lower fat content and are suitable as milk substitutes.

Coconut milk powder, a protein-rich powder, can be processed from coconut milk by centrifugation, separation, and spray drying.

Coconut milk and coconut cream extracted from grated coconut is often added to various desserts and savory dishes, as well as in curries and stews. It can also be diluted into a beverage. Various other products made from thickened coconut milk with sugar and/or eggs like coconut jam and coconut custard are also widespread in Southeast Asia. In the Philippines, sweetened reduced coconut milk is marketed as coconut syrup and is used for various desserts. Coconut oil extracted from coconut milk or copra is also used for frying, cooking, and making margarine, among other uses.

==== Coconut water ====
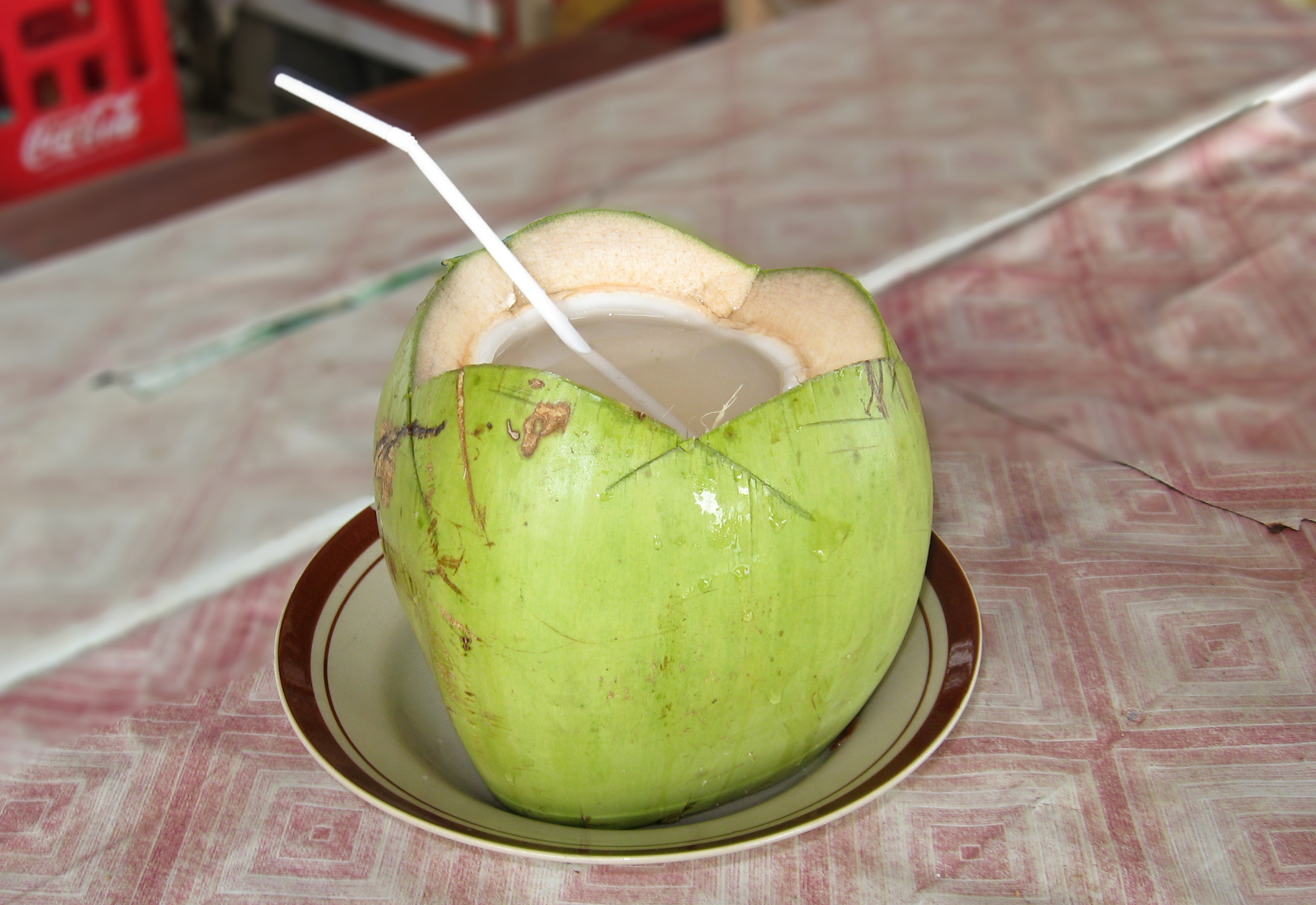
Coconut water drink

Coconut water serves as a suspension for the endosperm of the coconut during its nuclear phase of development. Later, the endosperm matures and deposits onto the coconut rind during the cellular phase. The water is consumed throughout the humid tropics, and has been introduced into the retail market as a processed sports drink. Mature fruits have significantly less liquid than young, immature coconuts, barring spoilage. Coconut water can be fermented to produce coconut vinegar.

Per 100-gram serving, coconut water contains 19 calories and no significant content of essential nutrients.

Coconut water can be drunk fresh or used in cooking as in binakol. It can be fermented to produce a jelly-like dessert known as nata de coco.

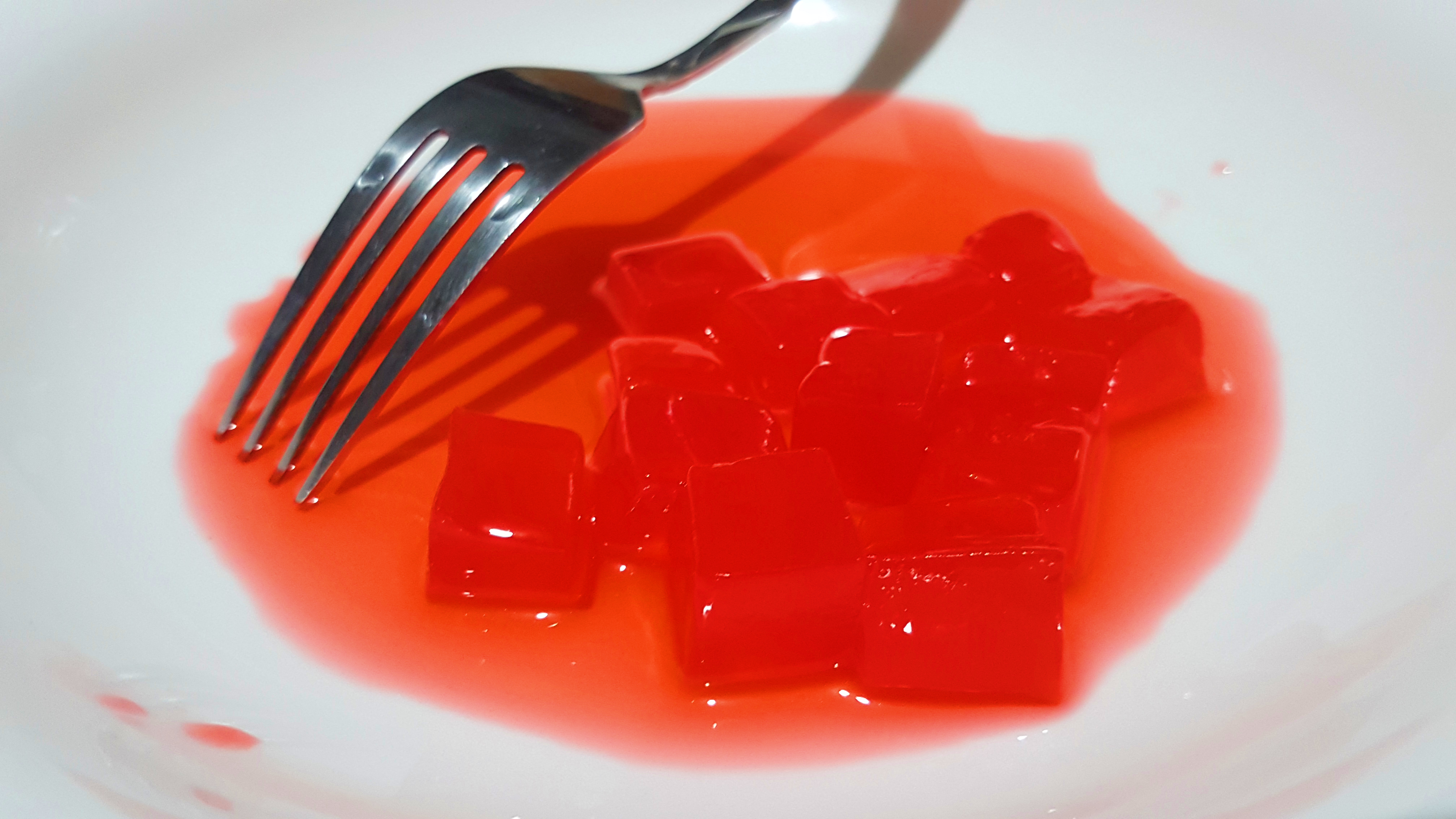
Red Nata de coco in syrup from the Philippines

Two important coconut products were first developed in the Philippines, Macapuno and Nata de coco. Macapuno is a coconut variety with a jelly-like coconut meat. Its meat is sweetened, cut into strands, and sold in glass jars as coconut strings, sometimes labeled as "coconut sport". Nata de coco or coconut gel is another jelly-like coconut product made from fermented coconut water.

==== Sprouted coconut ====
Newly germinated coconuts contain a spherical edible mass known as the sprouted coconut or coconut sprout. It has a crunchy watery texture and a slightly sweet taste. It is eaten as is or used as an ingredient in various dishes. It is produced as the endosperm nourishes the developing embryo. It is a haustorium, a spongy absorbent tissue formed from the distal part of embryo during coconut germination, which facilitates absorption of nutrients for the growing shoot and root.

==== Heart of palm ====
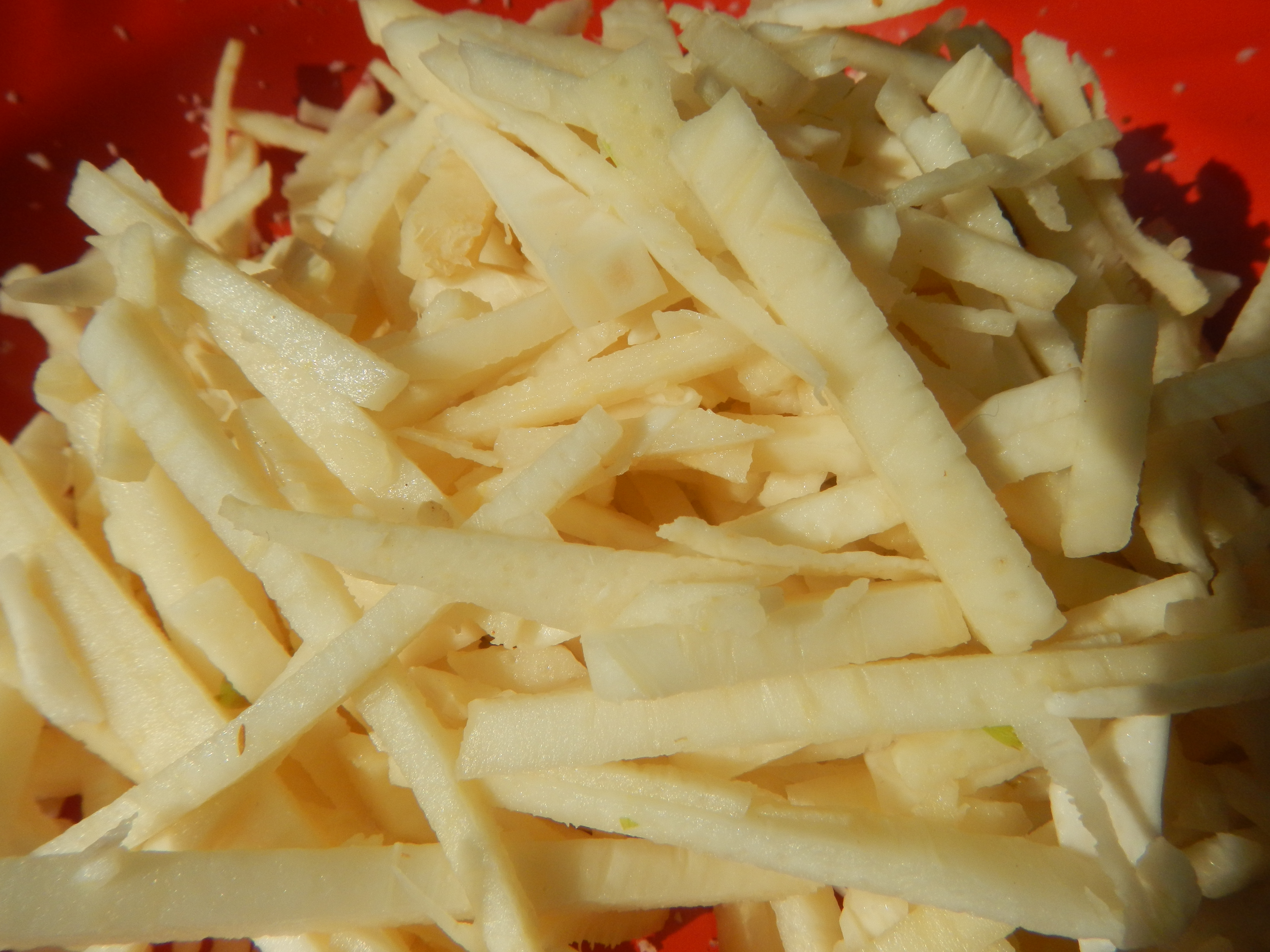
Ubod (coconut heart of palm) from the Philippines

Apical buds of adult plants are edible, and are known as "palm cabbage" or heart of palm. They are considered a rare delicacy, as harvesting the buds kills the palms. Hearts of palm are eaten in salads, sometimes called "millionaire's salad".

==== Toddy and sap ====
The sap derived from incising the flower clusters of the coconut is drunk as toddy or tubâ in the Philippines (both fermented and fresh), tuak (Indonesia and Malaysia), karewe (fresh and not fermented, collected twice a day, for breakfast and dinner) in Kiribati, and neera in South Asia. When left to ferment on its own, it becomes palm wine. Palm wine is distilled to produce arrack. In the Philippines, this alcoholic drink is called lambanog (historically also called vino de coco in Spanish) or "coconut vodka".

The sap can be reduced by boiling to create a sweet syrup or candy such as te kamamai in Kiribati or dhiyaa hakuru and addu bondi in the Maldives. It can be reduced further to yield coconut sugar, also called palm sugar or jaggery. A young, well-maintained tree can produce around 300 litres (79 US gallons) of toddy per year, while a 40-year-old tree may yield around 400 L (110 US gal).

Coconut sap, usually extracted from cut inflorescence stalks, is sweet when fresh and can be drunk as tuba fresca of Mexico. They can also be processed to extract palm sugar. Fermented sap can be made into coconut vinegar or palm wine, which can be further distilled to make arrack.

==== Coconut vinegar ====
Coconut vinegar, made from fermented coconut water or sap, is used extensively in Southeast Asian cuisine (notably the Philippines, where it is known as sukang tuba), as well as in some cuisines of India and Sri Lanka, especially Goan cuisine. A cloudy white liquid, it has a particularly sharp, acidic taste with a slightly yeasty note.

==== Coconut oil ====
Coconut oil is commonly used in cooking, especially for frying. It can be used in liquid form like other vegetable oils, or in solid form like butter or lard. Long-term consumption may have negative health effects like those from consuming other sources of saturated fats. Its chronic consumption may increase the risk of cardiovascular diseases by raising total blood cholesterol levels through elevated blood levels of LDL cholesterol and lauric acid.

==== Coconut butter ====
Coconut butter is a solidified coconut oil, but the name is also applied to creamed coconut, a specialty product made of coconut milk solids or puréed coconut meat and oil. It has a creamy consistency reminiscent of peanut butter.

=== Copra ===
Copra is the dried meat of the seed and after processing produces coconut oil and coconut meal. Coconut oil, aside from being used in cooking as an ingredient and for frying, is used in soaps, cosmetics, hair oil, and massage oil. Coconut oil is also a main ingredient in Ayurvedic oils. In Vanuatu, coconut palms for copra production are generally spaced 9 m (30 ft) apart, allowing a tree density of 100 to 160 per hectare (40 to 65 per acre).

It takes around 6,000 full-grown coconuts to produce one tonne of copra.

=== Husks and shells ===
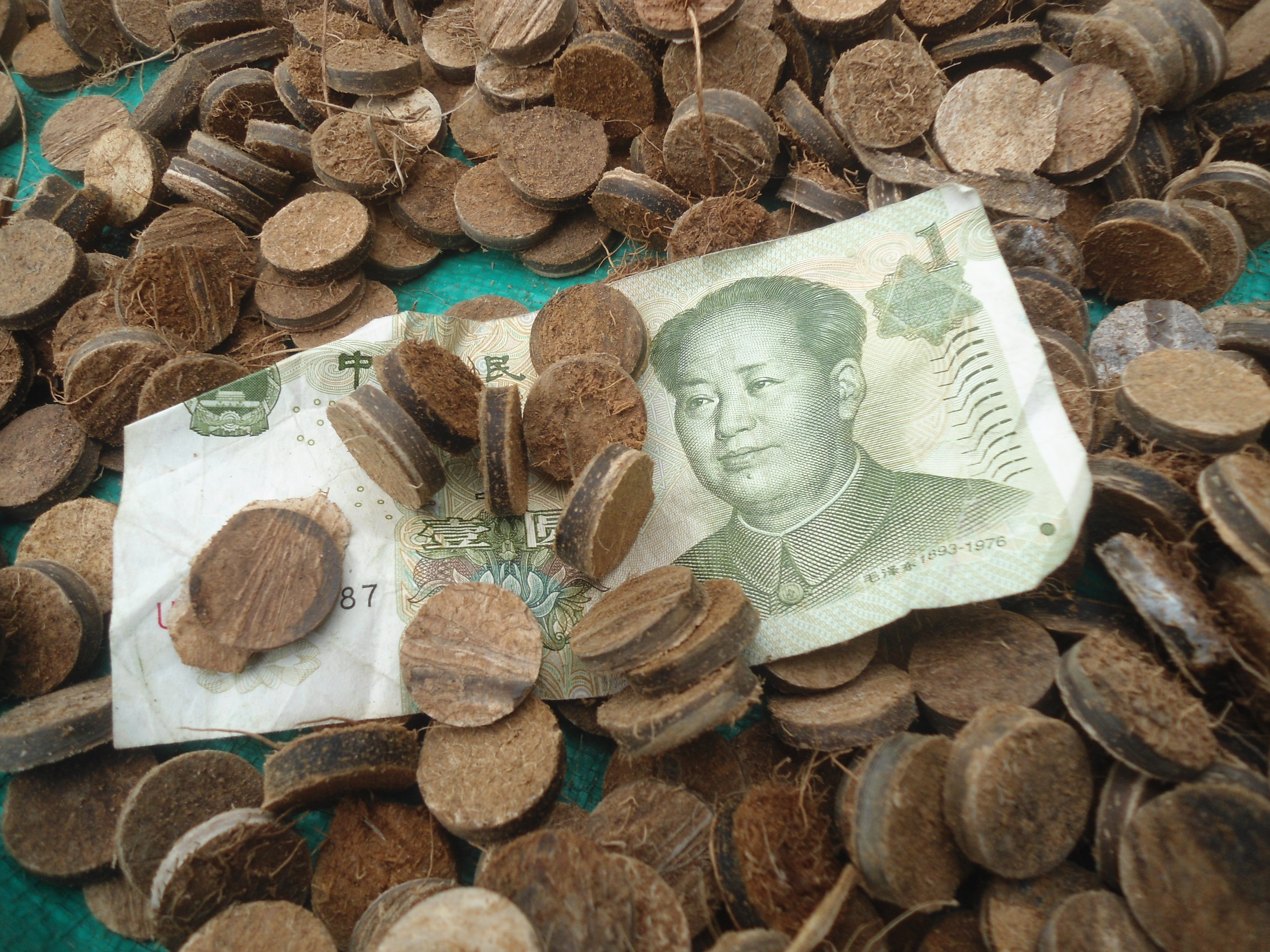
Coconut buttons in Dongjiao Town, Hainan, China

The husk and shells can be used for fuel and are a source of charcoal. Activated carbon manufactured from coconut shell is considered extremely effective for the removal of impurities. The coconut's obscure origin in foreign lands led to the notion of using cups made from the shell to neutralise poisoned drinks. Coconut cups were frequently carved with scenes in relief and mounted with precious metals.

The husks can be used as flotation devices. As an abrasive, a dried half coconut shell with husk can be used to buff floors. It is known as a bunot in the Philippines and simply a "coconut brush" in Jamaica. The fresh husk of a brown coconut may serve as a dish sponge or body sponge.

Coconut cups, often with highly decorated mounts in precious metals, were an exotic luxury in medieval and early modern Europe, that were also thought to have medical benefits. A coco chocolatero was a simpler type of cup used to serve small quantities of beverages (such as chocolate drinks) between the 17th and 19th centuries in countries such as Mexico, Guatemala, and Venezuela.

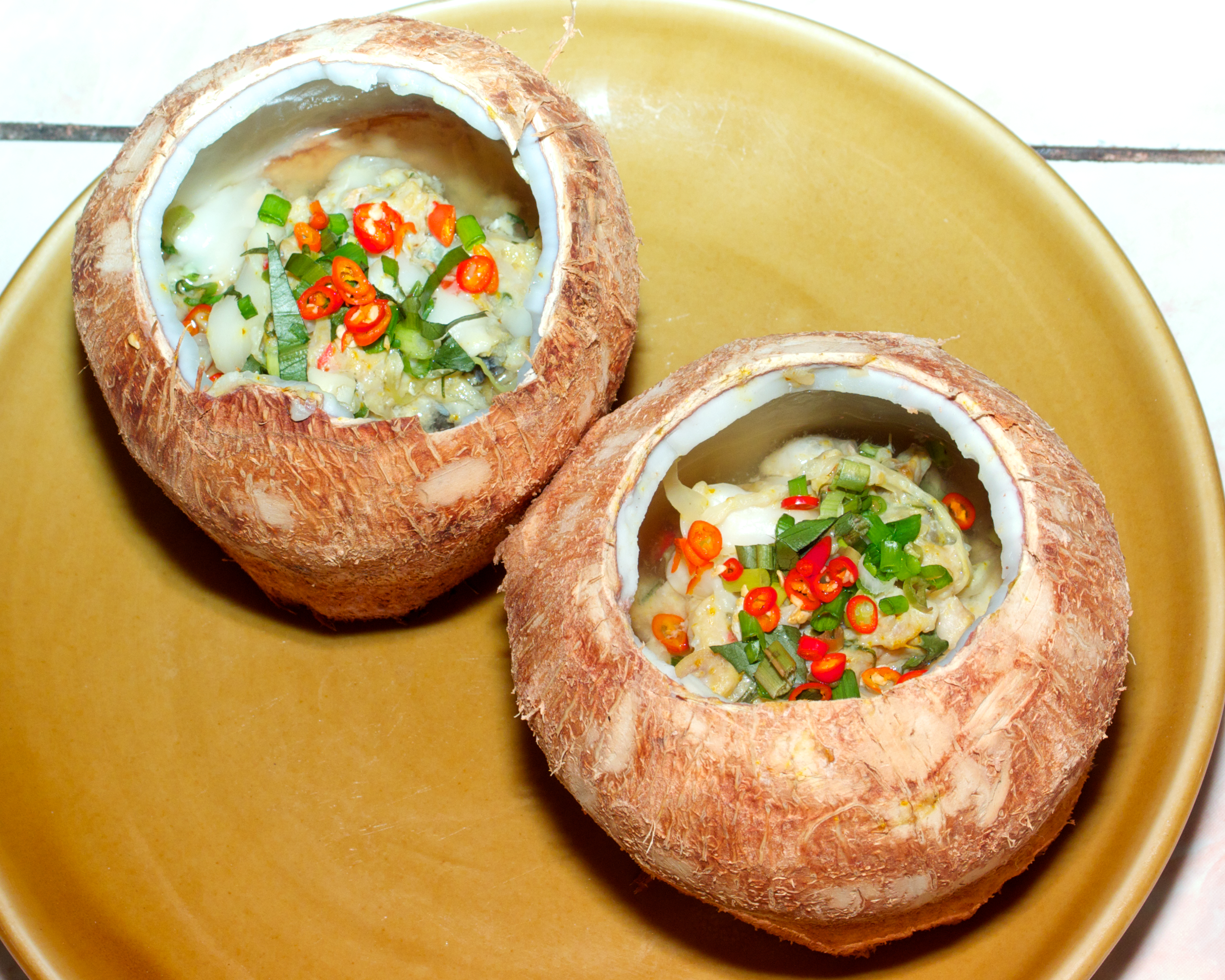
Fish curry being served in coconut shells in Thailand

In Asia, coconut shells are also used as bowls and in the manufacture of various handicrafts, including buttons carved from the dried shell. Coconut buttons are often used for Hawaiian aloha shirts. Tempurung, as the shell is called in the Malay language, can be used as a soup bowl and – if fixed with a handle – a ladle. In Thailand, the coconut husk is used as a potting medium to produce healthy forest tree saplings. The process of husk extraction from the coir bypasses the retting process, using a custom-built coconut husk extractor designed by ASEAN–Canada Forest Tree Seed Centre in 1986. Fresh husks contain more tannin than old husks. Tannin produces negative effects on sapling growth. The shell and husk can be burned for smoke to repel mosquitoes.

Half coconut shells are used in theatre Foley sound effects work, struck together to create the sound effect of a horse's hoofbeats. Dried half shells are used as the bodies of musical instruments, including the Chinese yehu and banhu, along with the Vietnamese đàn gáo and Arabo-Turkic rebab. In the Philippines, dried half shells are used as a musical instrument in a folk dance called maglalatik.

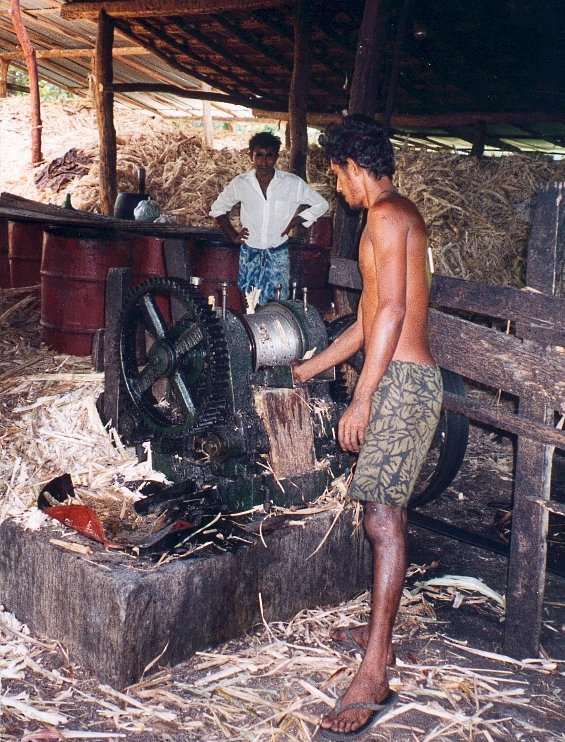
Extracting coir, the fiber from the coconut husk, in Sri Lanka

The shell, freed from the husk, and heated on warm ashes, exudes an oily material that is used to soothe dental pains in traditional medicine of Cambodia.

In World War II, coastwatcher scout Biuku Gasa was the first of two from the Solomon Islands to reach the shipwrecked and wounded crew of Motor Torpedo Boat PT-109 commanded by future U.S. president John F. Kennedy. Gasa suggested, for lack of paper, delivering by dugout canoe a message inscribed on a husked coconut shell, reading "Nauru Isl commander / native knows posit / he can pilot / 11 alive need small boat / Kennedy." This coconut was later kept on the president's desk, and is now in the John F. Kennedy Library.

The Philippine Coast Guard used unconventional coconut husk boom to clean up the oil slick in the 2024 Manila Bay oil spill.

==== Coir ====
Coir (the fiber from the husk of the coconut) is used in ropes, mats, doormats, brushes, and sacks, as caulking for boats, and as stuffing fiber for mattresses. It is used in horticulture in potting compost, especially in orchid mix. The coir is used to make brooms in Cambodia.

=== Leaves ===
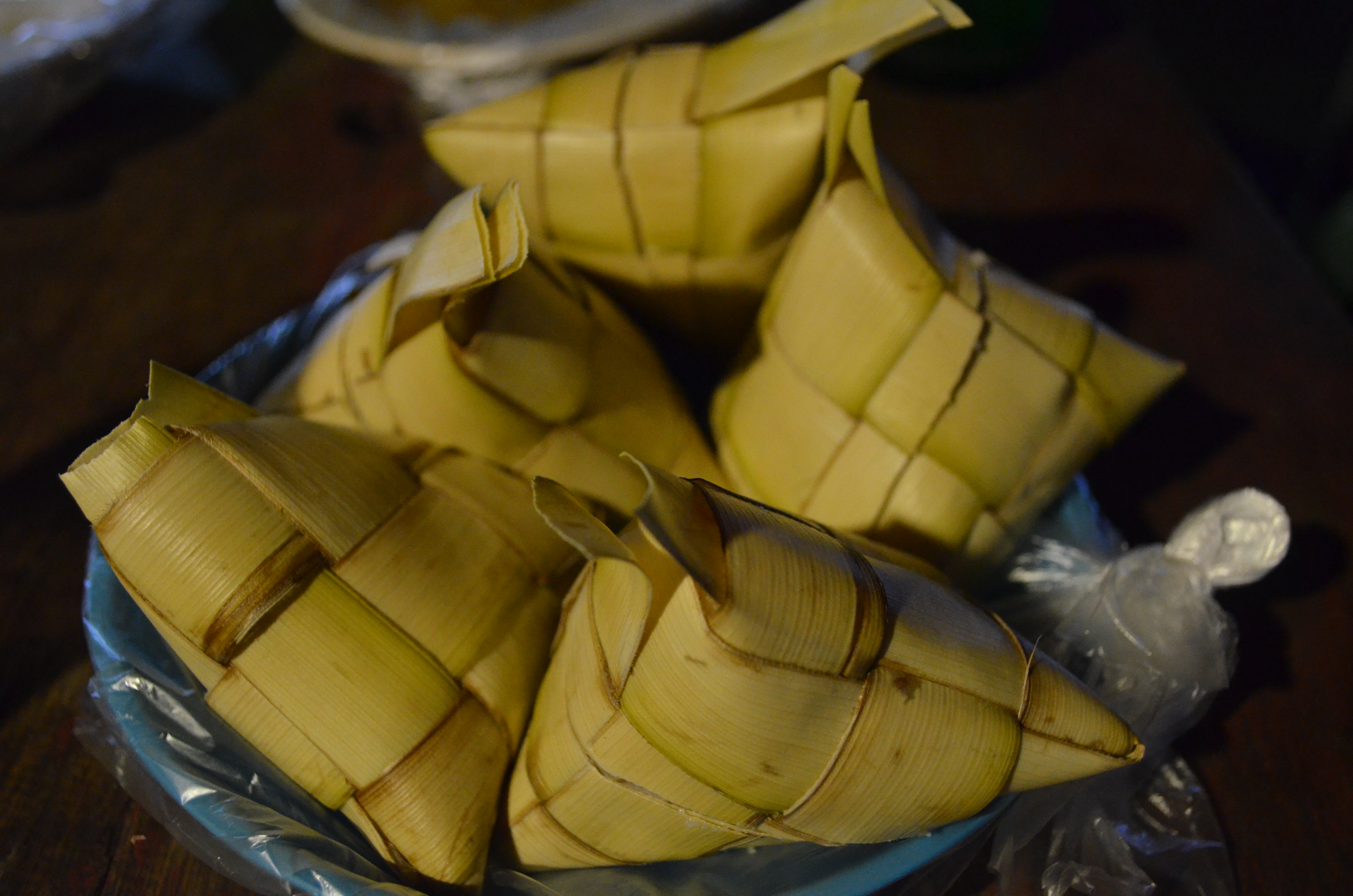
Pusô, woven pouches of rice in various designs from the Philippines

The stiff midribs of coconut leaves are used for making brooms in India, Indonesia (sapu lidi), Malaysia, the Maldives, and the Philippines (walis tingting). The green of the leaves (lamina) is stripped away, leaving the veins (long, thin, woodlike strips) which are tied together to form a broom or brush. A long handle made from some other wood may be inserted into the base of the bundle and used as a two-handed broom.

The leaves are used for thatching houses, or for decorating climbing frames and meeting rooms in Cambodia, where the plant is known as dôô:ng. Leaves are woven into baskets that can draw well water; they can be woven into mats, cooking skewers, kindling arrows, and small pouches that are filled with rice and cooked to make pusô and ketupat.

Dried coconut leaves can be burned to ash, which can be harvested for lime. In India, the woven coconut leaves are used to build wedding marquees, especially in the states of Andhra Pradesh, Kerala, Karnataka, and Tamil Nadu.

=== Timber ===
Coconut Palace, Manila, Philippines, built entirely out of coconut and local materials

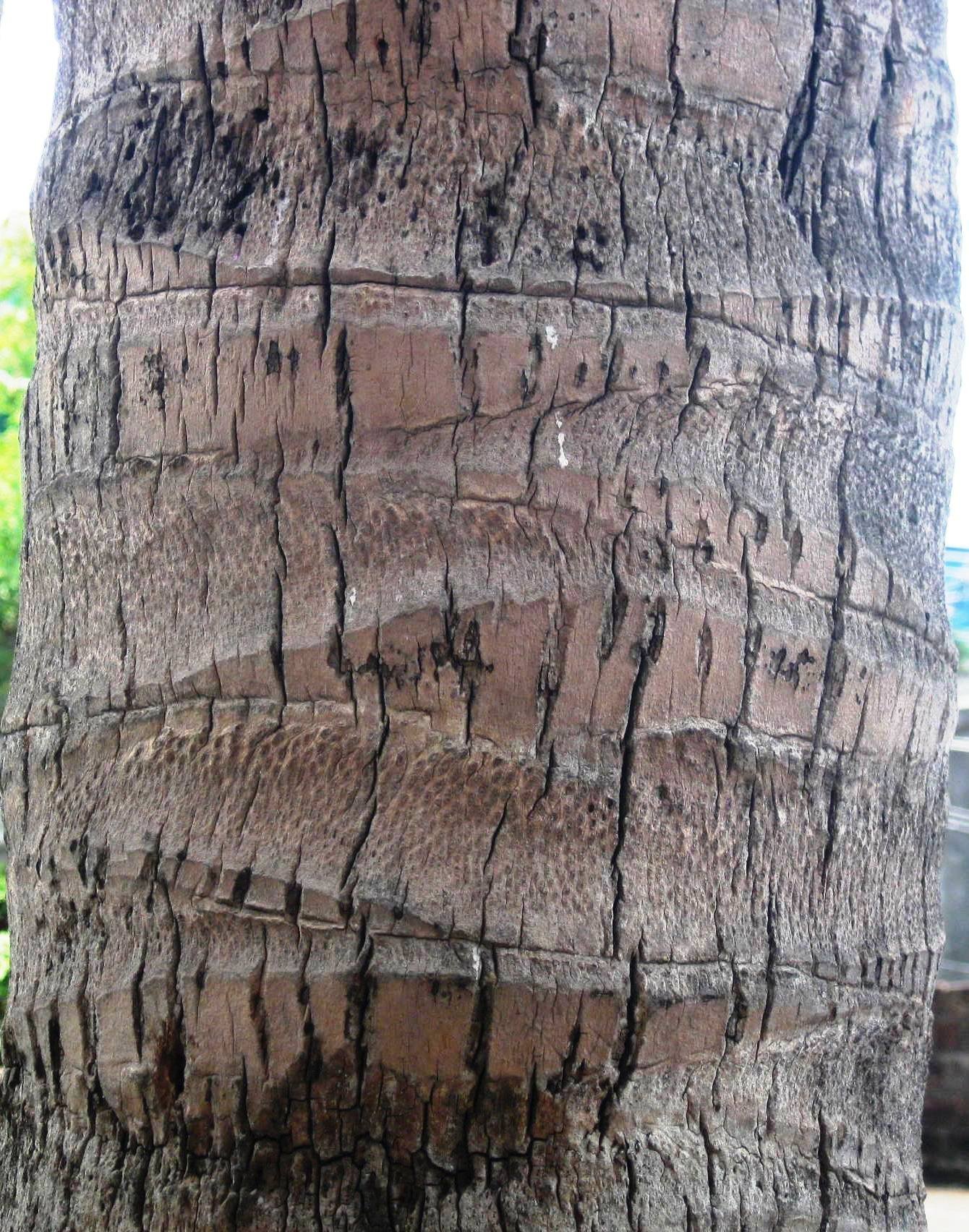
Coconut trunk

Coconut trunks are used for building small bridges and huts; they are preferred for their straightness, strength, and salt resistance. In Kerala, coconut trunks are used for house construction. Coconut timber comes from the trunk, and is increasingly being used as an ecologically sound substitute for endangered hardwoods. It has applications in furniture and specialized construction, as notably demonstrated in Manila's Coconut Palace.

Hawaiians hollowed out the trunk to form drums, containers, or small canoes. The "branches" (leaf petioles) are strong and flexible enough to make a switch. The use of coconut branches in corporal punishment was revived in the Gilbertese community on Choiseul in the Solomon Islands in 2005.

=== Roots ===
The roots are used to make dye, a mouthwash, and a folk medicine for diarrhea and dysentery. A frayed piece of root can also be used as a toothbrush. In Cambodia, the roots are used in traditional medicine as a treatment for dysentery.

=== Other uses ===
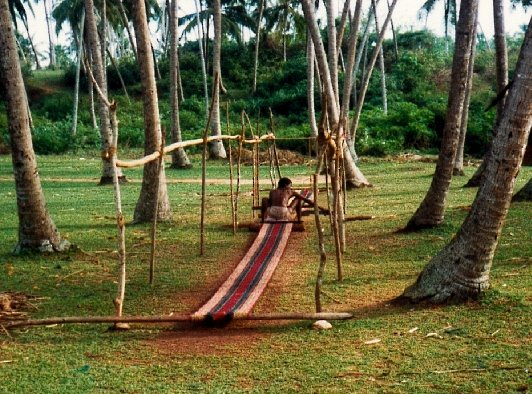
Making a rug from coconut fiber

The leftover fiber from coconut oil and coconut milk production, coconut meal, is used as livestock feed. The dried calyx is used as fuel in wood-fired stoves. Coconut water is traditionally used as a growth supplement in plant tissue culture and micropropagation. The smell of coconuts comes from the 6-pentyloxan-2-one molecule, known as δ-decalactone in the food and fragrance industries.

Researchers from the Melbourne Museum in Australia observed the octopus species Amphioctopus marginatus use tools, specifically coconut shells, for defense and shelter. The discovery of this behavior was observed in Bali and North Sulawesi in Indonesia between 1998 and 2008. Amphioctopus marginatus is the first invertebrate known to be able to use tools.

== See also ==
- Ravanahatha – a musical instrument sometimes made using a coconut
