= Guo zi =

Traditional Chinese sweet food

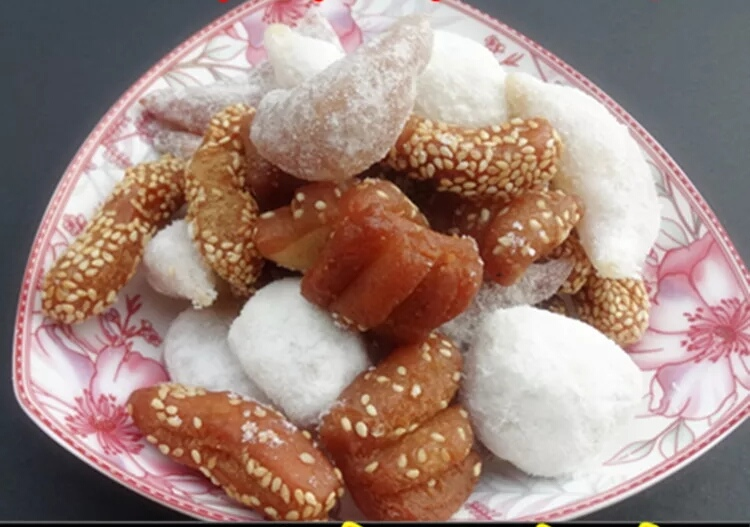

Guo zi (Chinese: 果子; pinyin: guǒzi), also called eight samples of xuzhou, is a traditional Chinese sweet food including eight kinds of xiaochi and popular in the northern regions. It is usually eaten at festivals or ceremonies. The Guo zi is not one food, but a collection of eight food items: Mi san dao, Yang jiao mi, Tiao su, Ma pian, Hua sheng tang, Jin qian bing, Nuo mi tiao and Gui hua su tang. Every food item has its own source, name and production method. Most items in Guo zi occurred in Chinese northern regions and the Guo zi occurred in Xu zhou in final. People usually send Guo zi to families or friends in festival or ceremony as a symbol of blessing. Many people buy these items individually and the Guo zi, as a collection, is a symbol of festivals or ceremonies.

== Mi san dao ==
Misandao is a Chinese traditional pastry made by honey. The name is relevant to its production method. Because the model should be cut three times on its surface to make it easy to absorb honey when it is fried, the food has three knife slits. Therefore, it is called misandao.

=== History ===
The Mi san dao has a deep relation with Su Shi. Legend has it that in the son dynasty, Su Dongpo was the governor of Xuzhou. His friend invited him to evaluate a treasure knife. After drink, his friend gave Su Dongpo the knife to evaluate. He was very surprised as it was really a treasure knife. So, Su Dongpo took the sword and cut three knives on the green stone in the place they drank. As he bent over it, the stone had left three deep cuts.

Then, the servant brought up the pastries, which contained a new kind of sweet pastry. This is made by his friend and, because Su Dongpo had a sweet tooth, his friend hoped Su Dongpo could give the sweet pastry a name. Su Dongpo tasted sweet as honey and very happy. Because of the three cuts on the stone and there are also three cuts on the food surface, Su Dongpo called the food "honey three knife".(Chinese: Mi san dao)

=== Ingredients ===
The ingredients are flour, caramel, vegetable oil and sesame.

== Yang jiao mi ==
Yang jiao mi is the traditional pastry in Xu zhou, Jiang su province. It is shaped like a ram's horn, with honey in it. So, it is named for its shape, like a goat's horn and plum beans. It contains honey.

=== History ===
In Chinese folklore, Xiang Yu has a battle with Liu Bang. When the army was tired and hungry, a shepherd boy gave Xiang Yu and Yu Ji a honey contained by a ram's horn. After they drank, Xiang Yu gave the shepherd his sword and the gold and silver in his army. When Xiang Yu went to his palace, he ordered his cook to make the food by flour and honey.

=== Ingredients ===
Flour, vegetable oil, white sugar, malt syrup.

== Tiao su ==
Tiao su is a kind of Han Chinese snacks in jiangnan region.

=== Ingredients ===
Flour, cinnamon sugar, granulated sugar, syrup.

== Ma Pian ==
The Ma Pian is a traditional Chinese food item.

=== Ingredients ===
Flour, sugar, yeast, water, edible oil.

== Hua Sheng Tang ==
Hua sheng tang is an ancient Chinese food item.

=== History ===
Folklore said that the earliest Hua sheng tang originated during the Warring States period. At that time, rich people usually went to other places to avoid wars. When they went there, some people cooked caramel and peanuts together. After cooling, they cut the candy into different small pieces.

=== Ingredients ===
Flour, sugar, yeast flour, water, oil, alkali.

== Jin Qian Bing ==
The Jin qian bing is a kind of jiangsu local snack made from white sparrow cowpeas, such as the size of a coin.

=== Ingredients ===
Flour, sugar, vegetable oil, water, soda, ammonia powder, sesame seed, essence.

== Nuo Mi Tiao ==
Nuo mi tiao is a han Chinese snack.

=== Ingredients ===
Glutinous rice noodles, white sugar, caramel, peanut oil.
