= Klepon =

Southeast Asian traditional rice cake

Klepon Onde-onde Buah Melaka
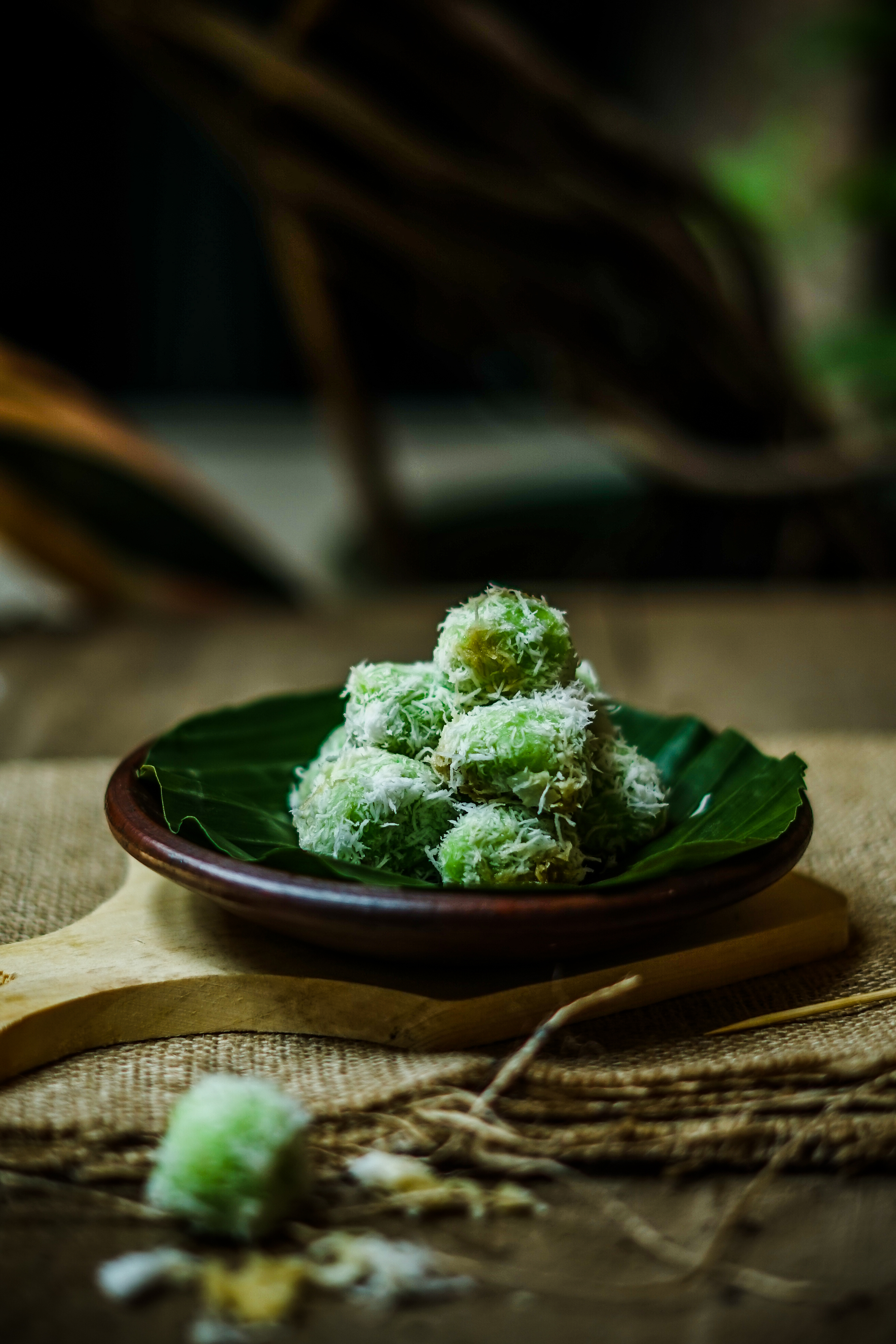
- A plate of klepon, also known as onde-onde or buah melaka
- Type: Kue/Kuih
- Place of origin: Maritime Southeast Asia
- Region or state: Sumatra, Java, Malay Peninsula, Borneo, Sulawesi
- Associated cuisine: Indonesia, Brunei, Malaysia and Singapore
- Serving temperature: Room temperature
- Main ingredients: Rice cake, palm sugar, grated coconut
- Variations: Klepon Ubi, Klepon Gianyar, Klepon Keju, Klepon Cake
- Similar dishes: Putli mandi, bua loi, mont lone yay baw, Khanom tom, tangyuan, modak

Klepon, also known as Onde-onde or Buah Melaka, is a traditional Southeast Asian confection made from glutinous rice flour filled with palm sugar and coated in grated coconut. Typically green in colour due to the use of pandan or suji leaf extract, the dough balls are boiled until the centre melts, producing a burst of sweetness when eaten. The confection is widely consumed in Indonesia, Malaysia, Brunei and Singapore, where it is commonly sold in traditional markets and classified as kue or kuih, terms for local confections often prepared for ceremonial or festive occasions. In Thailand, a similar preparation is referred to as khanom tom.

The traditional sweet holds cultural significance across various communities in Maritime Southeast Asia. In Bugis-Makassar and Balinese traditions, it features in ritual offerings and thanksgiving ceremonies. Among Malay and Banjar communities, it is commonly served during festive periods such as Ramadan. In Javanese culture, the delicacy carries symbolic meanings associated with inner virtue and the cycle of life. It also appears in ceremonial and matrimonial customs among the Minangkabau and Peranakan Chinese.

Contemporary versions have emerged in response to changing tastes and culinary innovation. Variations may include dough made with sweet potato or yam, and alternative fillings such as chocolate, red bean paste, cheese or salted egg yolk. The traditional flavour combination of pandan, palm sugar and coconut has also inspired a range of modern desserts and beverages, including cakes, ice cream and instant coffee.

== Origins and cultural significance ==
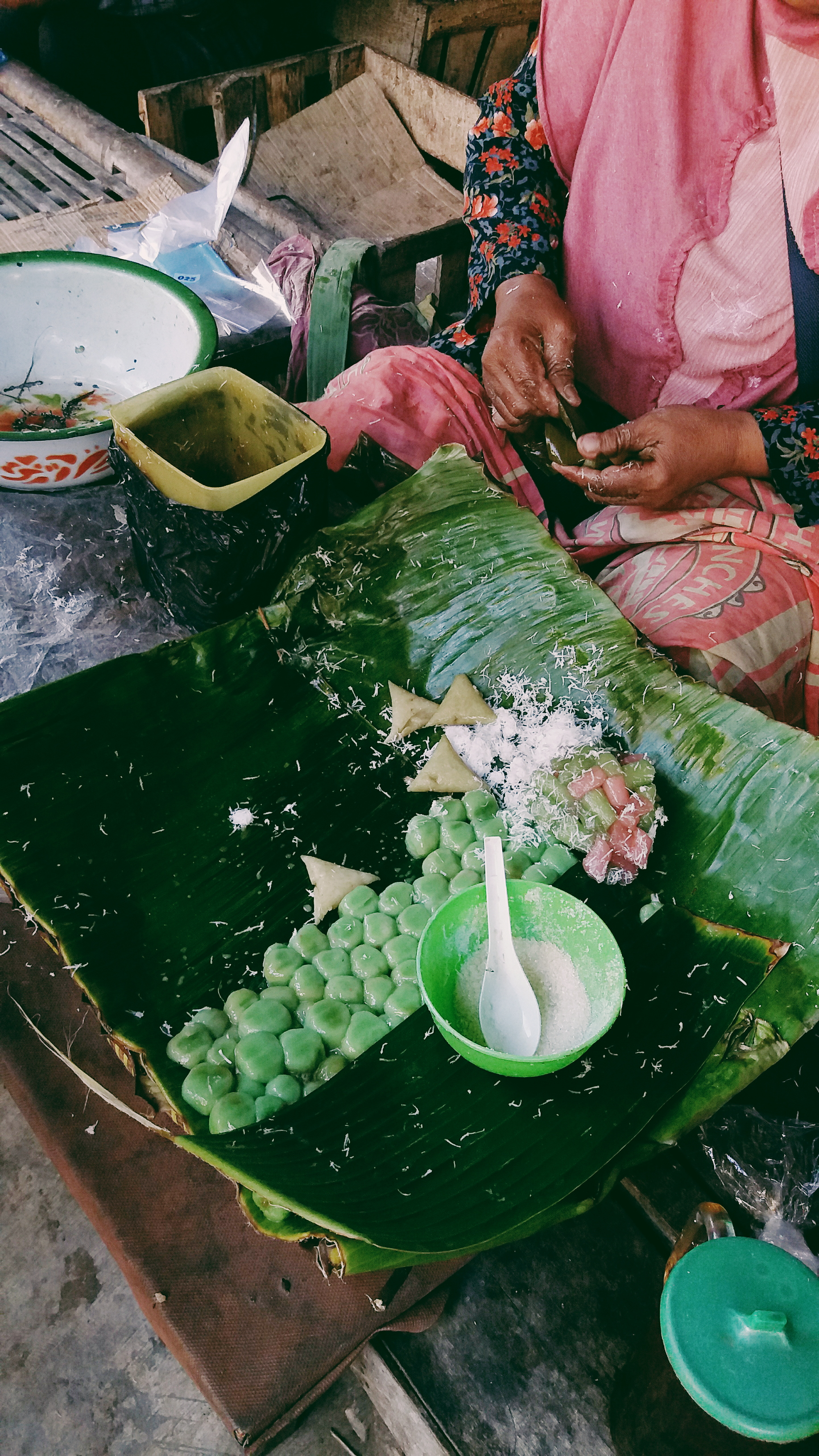
A woman preparing klepon by hand in Bantul, Yogyakarta

=== Literary references ===
The origin of this traditional sweet is not clearly documented, and there is no definitive evidence identifying where or when the dish was first created. It is commonly found across many parts of maritime Southeast Asia, including Sumatra, Java, the Malay Peninsula, Borneo and Sulawesi. Its widespread presence suggests that it emerged as part of a shared regional culinary heritage, rather than being tied to a single ethnic or geographic origin.

The earliest known written reference to related confections appears in "A Comparative Vocabulary of the Barmá, Maláya and Thái Languages", compiled by Scottish orientalist John Leyden in 1810. In this work, Leyden recorded the terms onde-onde (entry no. 2210) and buah melaka (entry no. 2233) as Malay sweetmeats, written in Jawi script, demonstrating the presence of these sweets in Malay culinary traditions of the period.

A few years later, in 1814, klepon is mentioned in Serat Centhini, a Javanese literary manuscript from the Surakarta court. Although this reference indicates the presence of klepon in Javanese culinary practice at the time, food historian Fadly Rahman of Universitas Padjadjaran notes that it does not necessarily imply that the dish originated in Surakarta or is uniquely Javanese.

Rahman further explains that similar confections are widely known across Indonesia, including in Bali, Sulawesi and Sumatra, and have become part of local cuisines in neighbouring countries such as Malaysia and Singapore. This widespread familiarity reflects a shared culinary heritage throughout the region, shaped by long-standing cultural interactions and common staple ingredients.

Culinary observer Ary Budiyanto of Universitas Brawijaya supports this perspective, emphasising that while klepon is often identified as a traditional Javanese snack, its deep-rooted presence across the Indonesian archipelago and broader Southeast Asia makes it difficult to assign to any single ethnic or regional origin.

=== Onde-onde and umba-umba in Bugis-Makassar culture ===
A comparable variant of this glutinous rice ball confection is found in South Sulawesi, where it is known as onde-onde, or umba-umba among the Makassar communities. According to local tradition, this version has been part of ceremonial and culinary practices since at least the 13th or 14th century. It is typically prepared for thanksgiving occasions such as housewarmings and the celebration of new acquisitions.

Onde-onde is prepared using rice flour, grated coconut and palm sugar, ingredients that are also common in similar confections across the region. Within Bugis-Makassar culture, these components carry symbolic meanings: palm sugar signifies joy or affection, rice flour represents strength and coconut denotes enjoyment. The round shape of the confection symbolises unity and harmony, while the name umba-umba, meaning "to rise" or "to emerge", reflects cultural aspirations for prosperity and social advancement. According to Dr Firman Saleh, a cultural expert from Universitas Hasanuddin, onde-onde embodies both hope and prayer. This symbolic meaning underlies its role as an essential offering during traditional thanksgiving rituals and ceremonial events in Bugis Makassar culture.

Onde-onde is also included in Deppa Pitu, a traditional grouping of seven ceremonial cakes associated with Bugis-Makassar food culture. This set of confections is typically prepared for important ritual occasions and reflects longstanding customs surrounding symbolic food offerings. While onde-onde was originally white in colour, modern versions may feature green or red colouring, illustrating changes in aesthetic preferences and culinary practices over time.

=== Buah melaka and onde-onde in Malay traditions ===
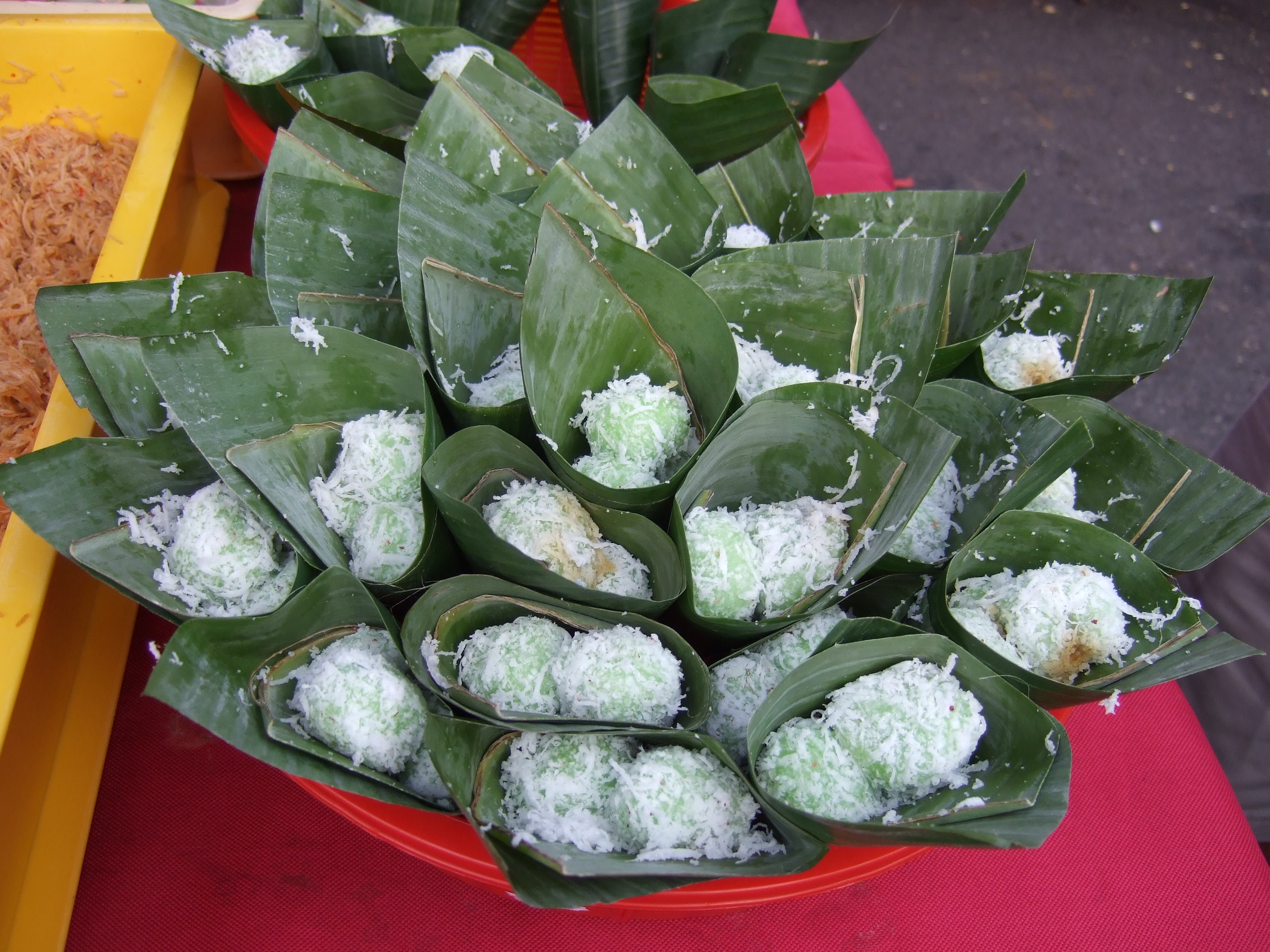
Buah melaka/onde-onde served in a cone-shaped banana leaf, sold at a traditional market in Malaysia

In the Malay Peninsula, comparable confections are known as buah melaka and onde-onde, both of which appear in John Leyden’s 1810 Comparative Vocabulary of the Barmá, Maláya, and Thái Languages. Their inclusion in this early lexicon indicates the established presence of such sweets within Malay culinary tradition by the early 19th century.

Within Malay culture, buah melaka is also considered to hold symbolic value, particularly during festive and religious occasions such as the breaking of fast in Ramadan. Buah melaka is thought to refer to the confection’s resemblance to the fruit of the Melaka tree, while onde-onde is commonly associated with the process of shaping dough into small spherical forms. Although the two names are often used interchangeably, there are subtle differences in their ingredients and regional usage. Buah melaka typically contains lighter-coloured gula melaka (palm sugar), while onde-onde in some areas uses darker gula nisan, a type of sugar made from coconut sap. On the east coast of Peninsular Malaysia, the snack is also known locally as kuih kekoh caar.

A closely related variation is found in the Riau region of Indonesia and the eastern coast of Sumatra, where the dough is made using sweet potatoes, particularly yellow or honey varieties, instead of glutinous rice flour. While maintaining the traditional palm sugar filling and grated coconut coating, this version reflects local adaptations based on regional ingredients, illustrating the shared Malay culinary heritage across Sumatra, Malay Peninsula and the surrounding maritime areas.

=== Symbolism and cultural meaning in Javanese tradition ===
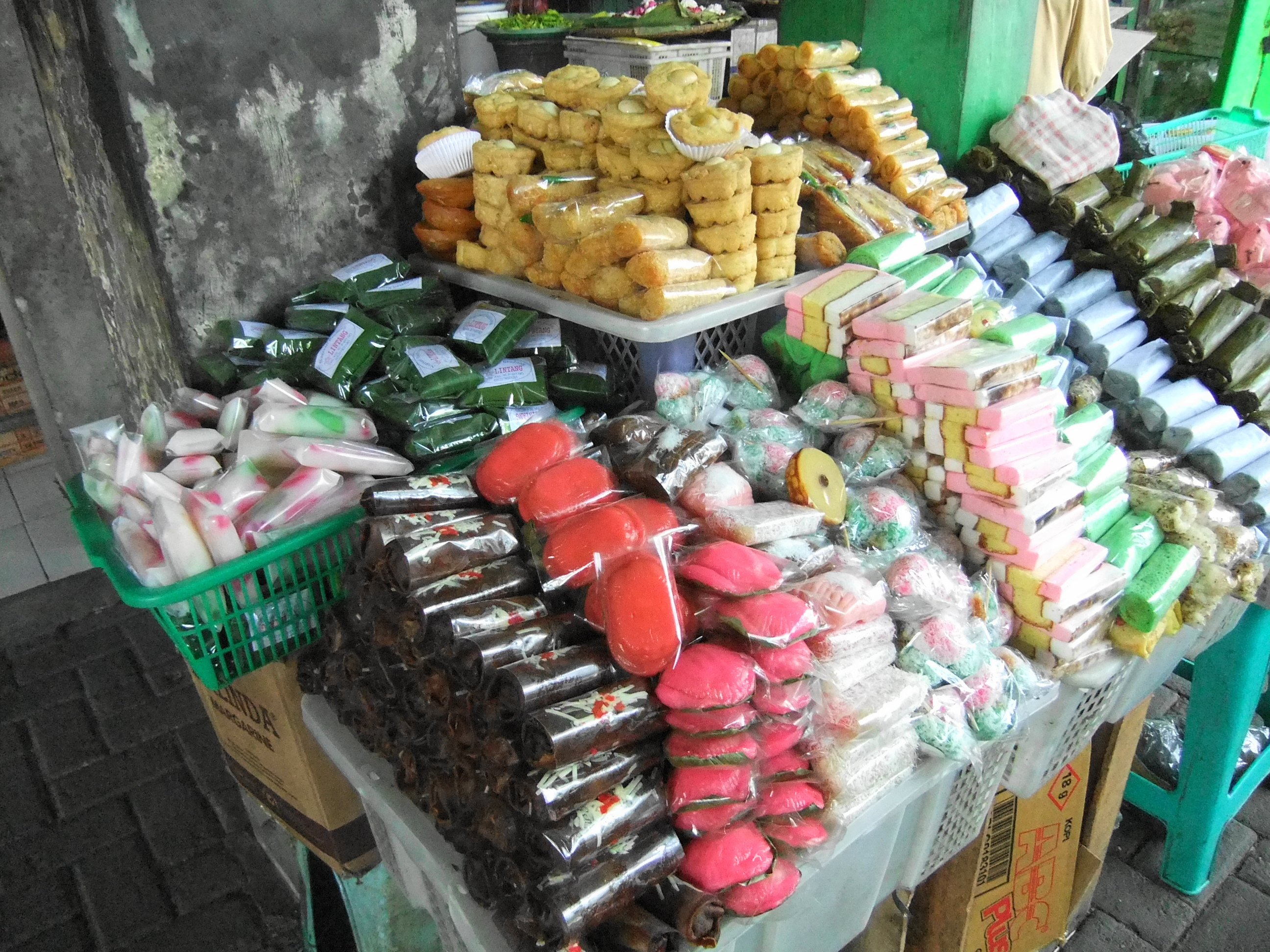
Klepon sold as part of kue jajan pasar (traditional market snacks) in Semarang, Central Java

In Javanese culture, klepon carries symbolic meaning in addition to its role as a traditional snack. It is referenced in the Serat Centhini, a literary manuscript from the Surakarta court compiled in 1814, where it is listed among the foods served at social gatherings. This suggests that klepon had become a familiar part of communal life in Java by the early 19th century.

The name klepon is believed to be derived from a Javanese word referring to an animal's ovum or egg, likely in reference to its small, round shape. Within Javanese cultural interpretation, the round yet uneven shape of klepon is seen as a reflection of life’s uncertainties and imperfections. The natural green colouring, derived from pandan or suji leaves, is associated with vitality and fertility. These symbolic associations highlight how klepon has been viewed not only as food but also as an expression of philosophical and cultural values.

The hidden palm sugar filling is interpreted as a symbol of inner kindness or virtue, suggesting that goodness may not always be visible but is revealed over time. The coating of grated coconut reflects the layered nature of human life, where individuals must undergo various experiences before achieving maturity and wisdom. Together, these elements convey how klepon is not only a traditional snack but also a food with embedded philosophical and cultural significance in Javanese society.

=== Jaje Klepon and Klepon Gianyar in Balinese cuisine ===
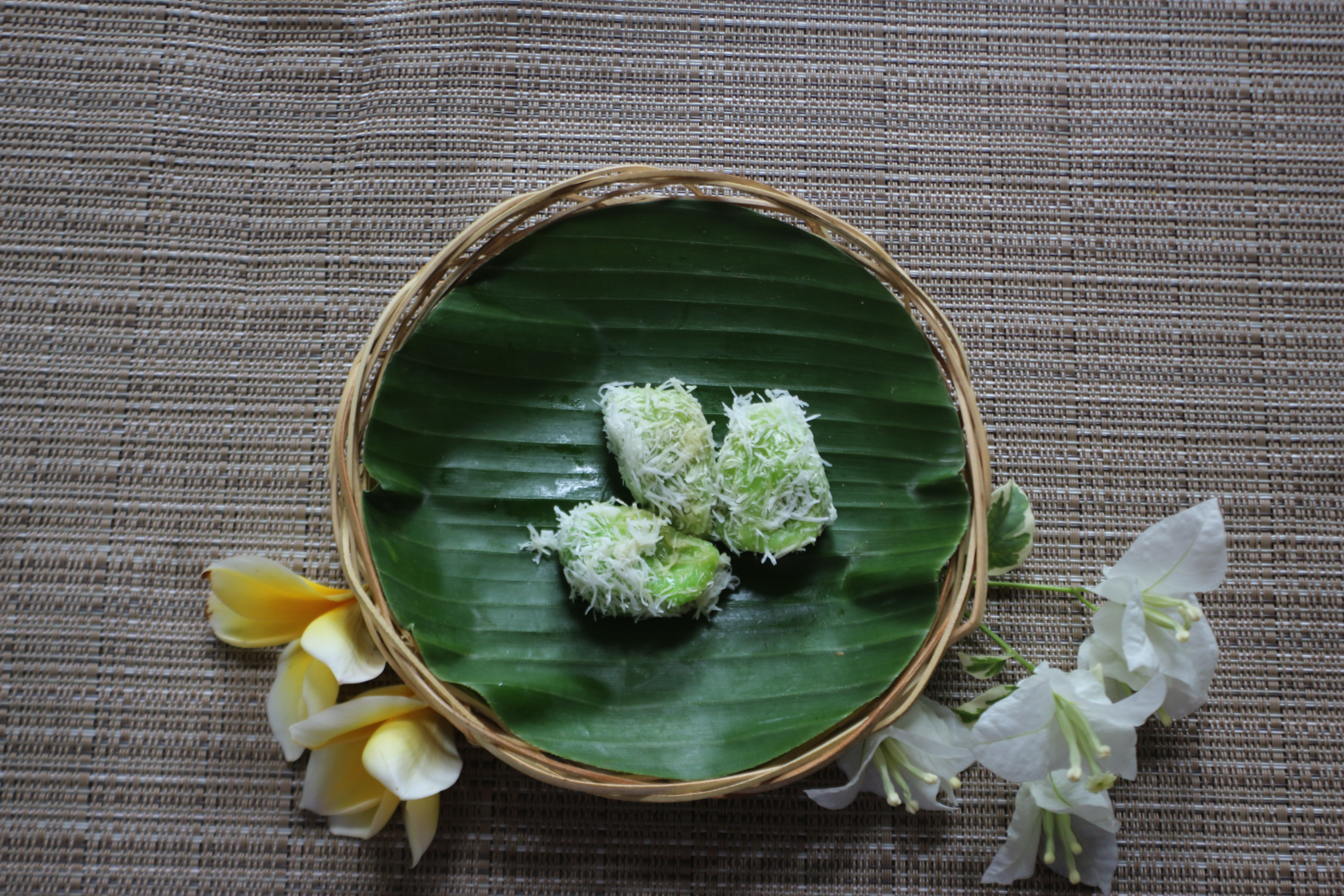
A Balinese variant of klepon, slightly elongated in shape

In Bali, klepon is commonly known as jaje klepon and is widely recognised as a traditional market snack. It is typically sold in banana leaf containers or wrapped in small plastic packages, and is considered part of the broader category of jajan pasar (market snacks). In addition to its everyday consumption, jaje klepon plays an important role in Hindu religious ceremonies in Bali. It is frequently included as part of ritual offerings in events such as weddings (pawiwahan) and tooth filing ceremonies (metatah), where it symbolises blessing, sweetness and hospitality.

A distinct regional variation, known as klepon Gianyar, is associated with Gianyar Regency in Bali. Unlike the Javanese version, which typically contains a solid piece of palm sugar that melts during boiling, klepon Gianyar is filled with liquid palm sugar during the shaping process. This method requires careful handling to avoid leakage during cooking. The resulting confection often has a slightly elongated shape due to the larger cavity used for the liquid filling. The use of Balinese palm sugar, noted for its deep and aromatic flavour, contributes to a sweeter and more intense taste.

=== Kalapun and Banjar oral tradition ===
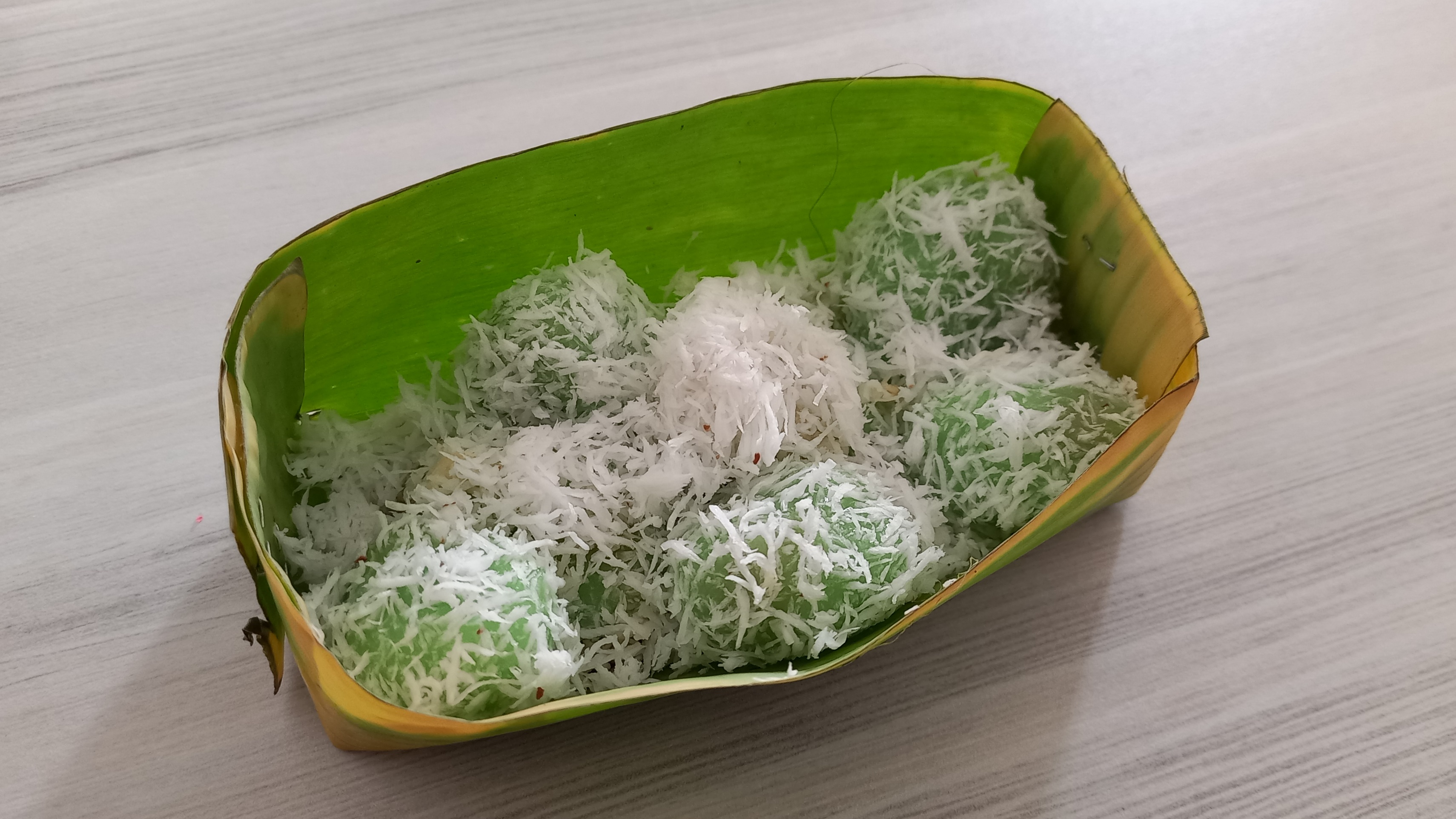
Kalalapun served in a leaf basket in Banjarmasin, South Kalimantan

A similar confection exists in South Kalimantan, where it is known as kalalapun or kalapun. This traditional glutinous rice ball dessert is particularly associated with the Banjar ethnic group and remains a well-known delicacy across the province, especially in the town of Martapura. It is especially popular during the month of Ramadan, where it is commonly sold as a sweet iftar treat in local Ramadan markets. Kalalapun is classified under the category of papuluran, a term in Banjar culinary tradition referring to small traditional snacks typically served as part of everyday meals and local celebrations.

Unlike the written records associated with klepon, onde-onde and buah melaka, the origins of kalapun are preserved through oral tradition. According to a well-known Banjar folktale, the name derives from a story about a young woman named Galuh who, while preparing rice cakes for her ailing mother, was startled by a scorpion while using a traditional wooden mortar, known locally as a lesung. She reportedly exclaimed “kalapun” a word combining kala, meaning scorpion, and pun, an affirmative expression in the local dialect. The rice cake she made, filled with melted palm sugar and coated in grated coconut, was well received by neighbours and came to be known as kalalapun. While the origin story is folkloric, kalapun remains an integral part of Banjar culinary tradition to the present day.

=== Onde-onde in Minangkabau ceremonial cuisine ===
In West Sumatra, a variant of this glutinous rice ball confection is part of the Minangkabau culinary tradition, where it is known as onde-onde. It features prominently in parabuang, a customary selection of foods prepared for ceremonial and religious events. Onde-onde is commonly served during occasions such as manjalang karumah mintuo (a traditional visit to the in-laws) and Maulid Nabi celebrations. In these contexts, it is typically presented alongside other local confections such as lapek manih, kue sumsum, fried pisang raja and jelly-based desserts, forming an integral part of the festive food offerings in Minangkabau culture.

=== Role in Peranakan Chinese customs ===
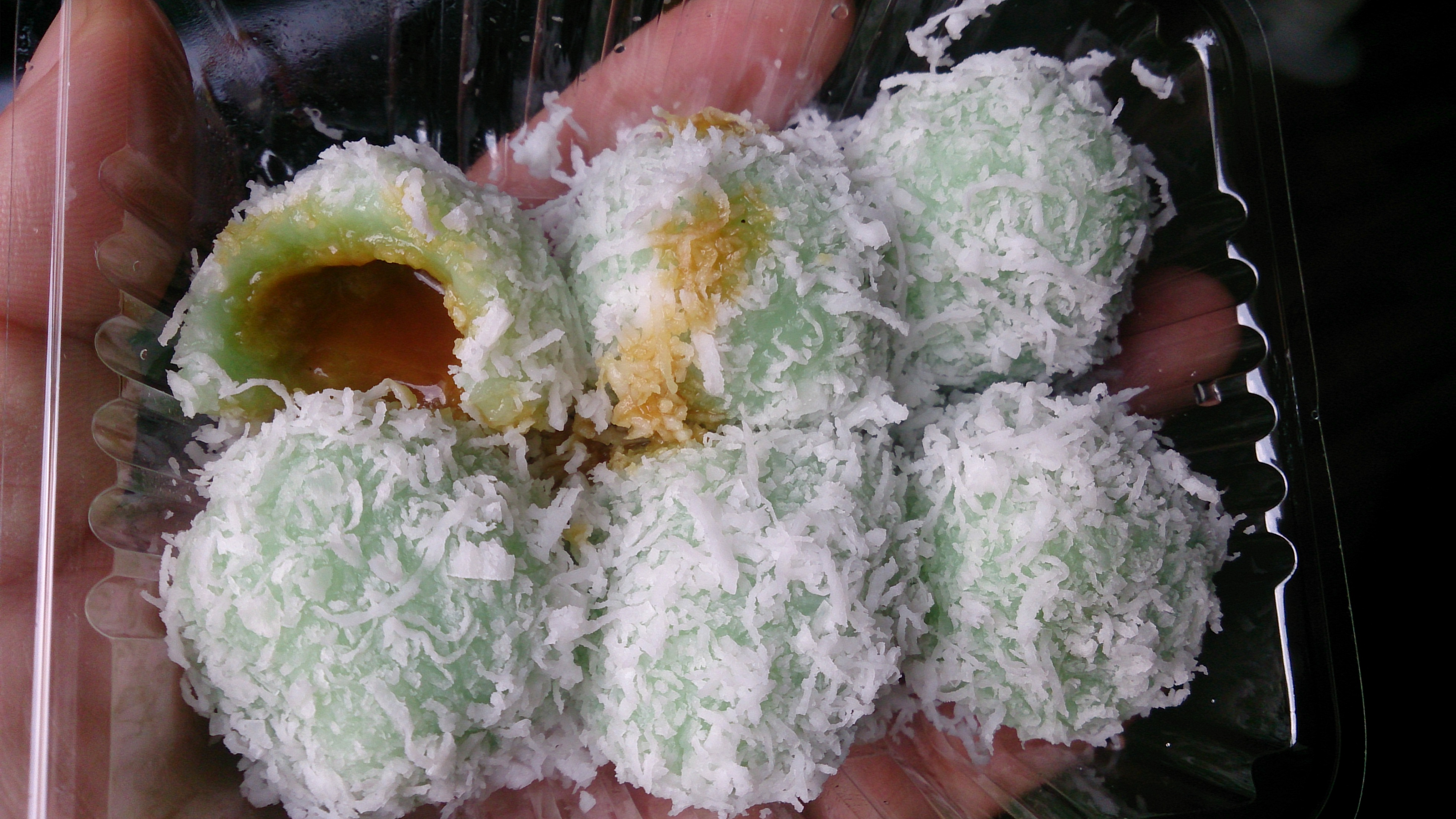
Several pieces of Peranakan-style onde-onde, with one partially opened to reveal the melted palm sugar filling.

In Peranakan Chinese culinary tradition, onde-onde also holds cultural and symbolic value, particularly within the Baba Nyonya community. This group comprises descendants of early Chinese settlers who assimilated into local indigenous society. Among them, kuih such as onde-onde are central to social customs and are commonly featured during festive occasions and family ceremonies, where food serves as a medium for expressing identity and communal values.

Onde-onde is especially associated with wedding traditions, where it is believed to represent fertility, prosperity, and affectionate union. According to Malaysian Nyonya chef Debbie Teoh, the round shape and sweet palm sugar centre are interpreted as symbolic of intimacy and abundance. Such interpretations reflect the broader Peranakan cultural practice of embedding layered meanings within food, highlighting how confections like onde-onde are valued not only for their taste but also for their cultural and ritual significance.

=== Sensory-based names in Brunei, West Kalimantan and Lombok ===
In several regions of Maritime Southeast Asia, local terms for this traditional confectionery reflect both linguistic variation and sensory associations. In Brunei, it is known as kueh pancut, with pancut in Brunei Malay referring to a quick spurt of liquid. In parts of West Kalimantan, the confection is called klepon pancit, while in Lombok, it is known as klepon kecerit, a version that is often slightly elongated in shape. The terms pancit and kecerit also carry meanings related to leaking or sudden release. These names are believed to refer to the characteristic sensation of molten palm sugar bursting out when the rice ball is bitten into, illustrating how klepon has been integrated into local vocabularies through vivid, sensory-based terminology.

== Regional forms, colour variations and related confectionaries ==
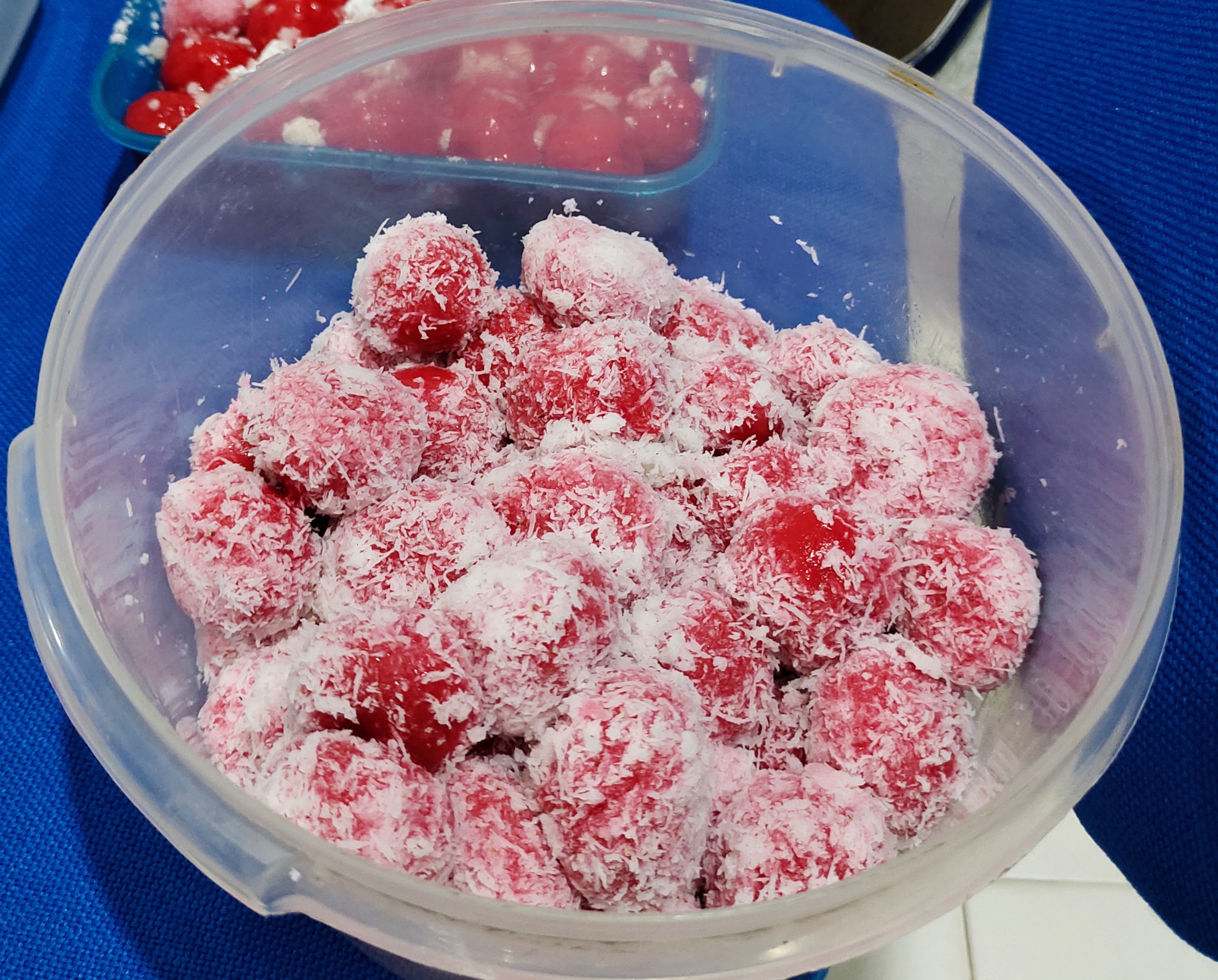
Red-coloured kalalapun served in Martapura, South Kalimantan

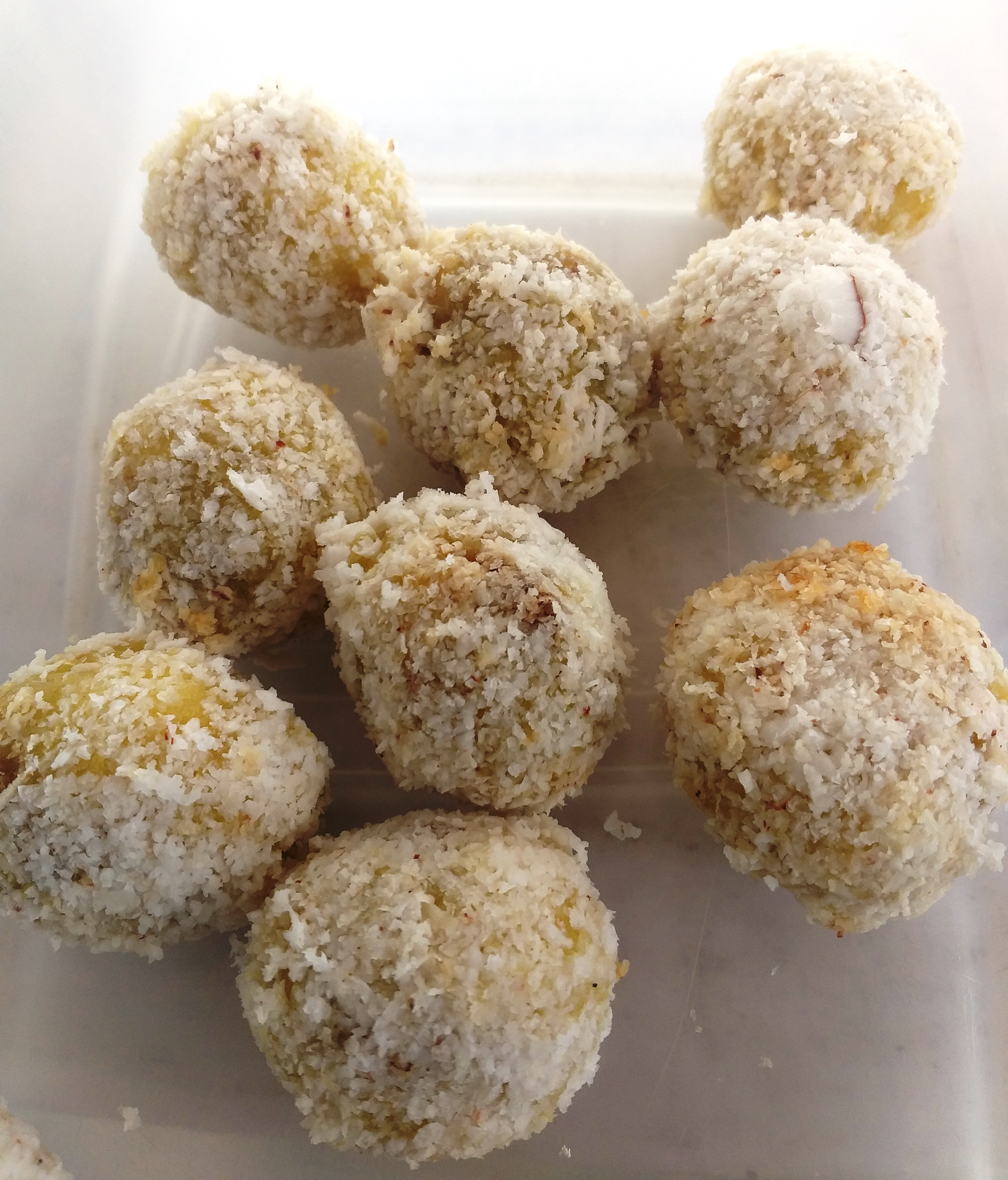
Brown-coloured onde-onde Pulo from North Sulawesi

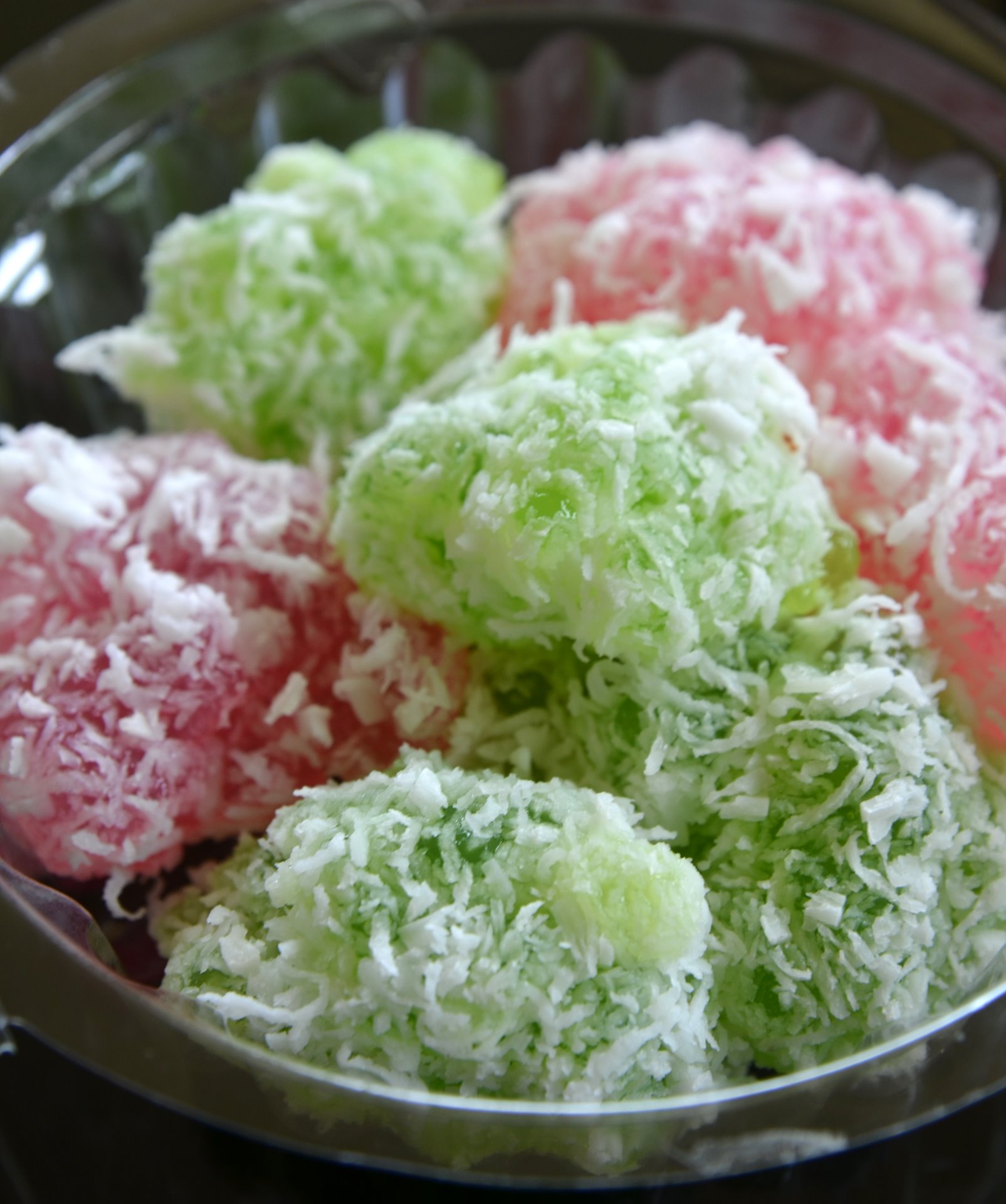
Khanom tom, a Thai glutinous rice confection similar to klepon/onde-onde/buah melaka

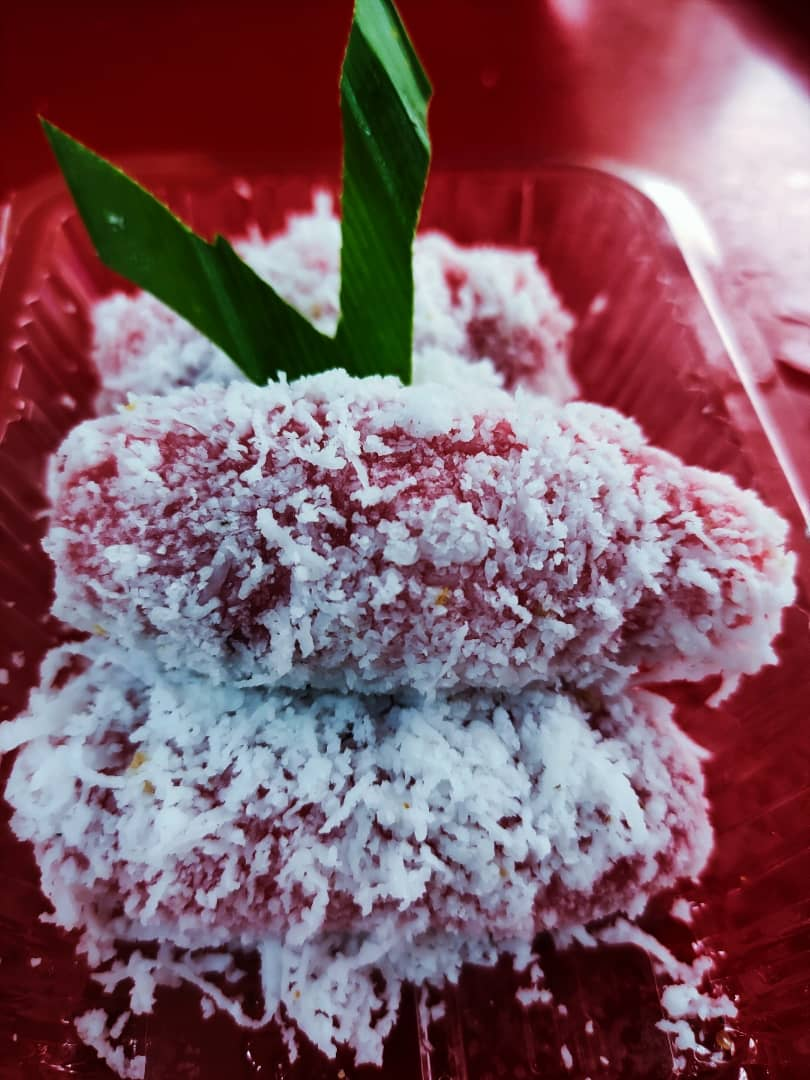
Kuih ulat bulu, from Kelantan and Terengganu, filled with red bean paste

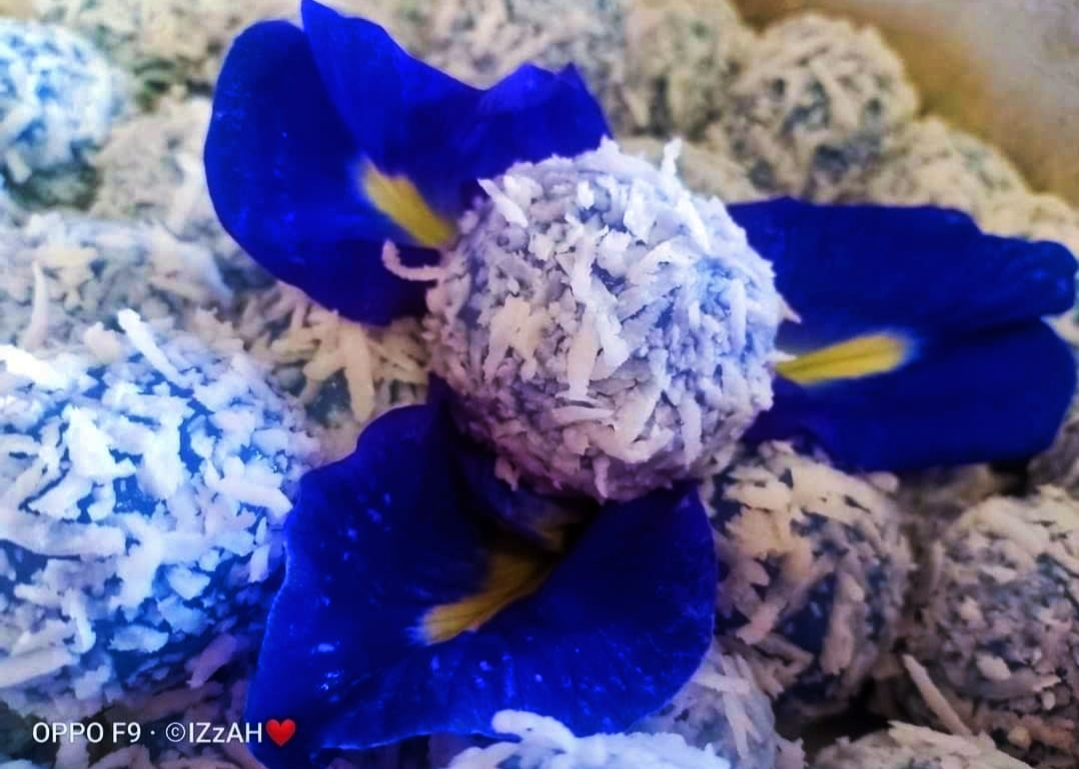
Blue-coloured buah melaka, naturally dyed with bunga telang (butterfly pea flower)

== Culinary characteristics ==
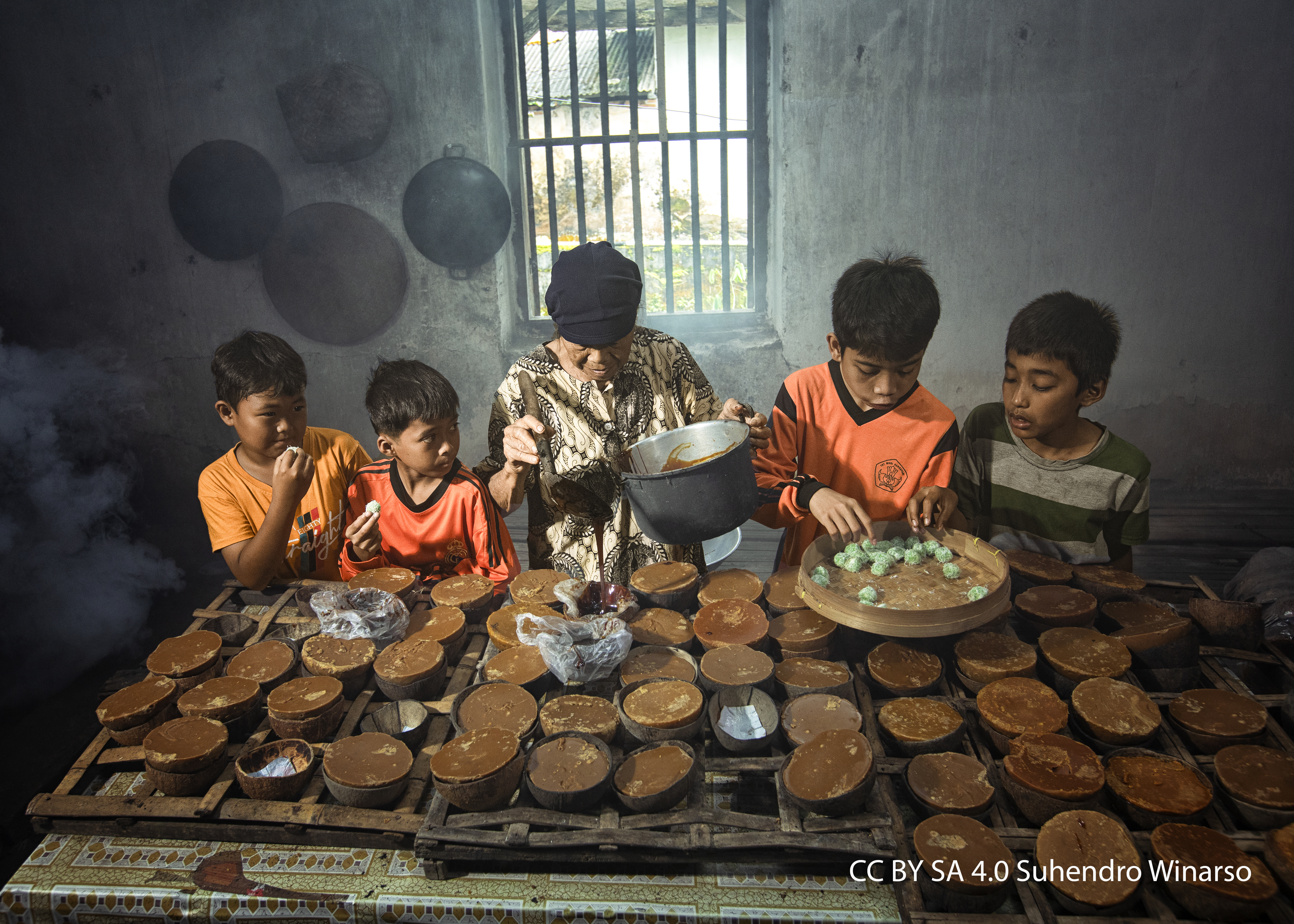
An elderly woman and several children preparing klepon in a traditional kitchen setting

=== Traditional preparation ===
This traditional sweet is a boiled glutinous rice cake filled with molten palm sugar and coated in grated coconut. The dough is typically made from glutinous rice flour and may include tapioca flour or mashed sweet potato as an additional binding agent. The distinctive green colour is usually obtained from natural plant extracts, most commonly pandan or suji leaves, both of which are widely used in Southeast Asian cooking for their aroma and colouring properties.

Small pieces of solid palm sugar, known regionally as gula jawa, gula merah or gula Melaka, are inserted into portions of the dough, which are then shaped into round balls. These are boiled until the dough becomes tender and the sugar inside melts, forming a liquid centre. Careful preparation is required to ensure the sugar remains contained during the cooking process. Once cooked, the klepon balls are rolled in freshly grated coconut, which adheres to the sticky surface of the dough.

=== Contemporary variations and culinary innovations ===
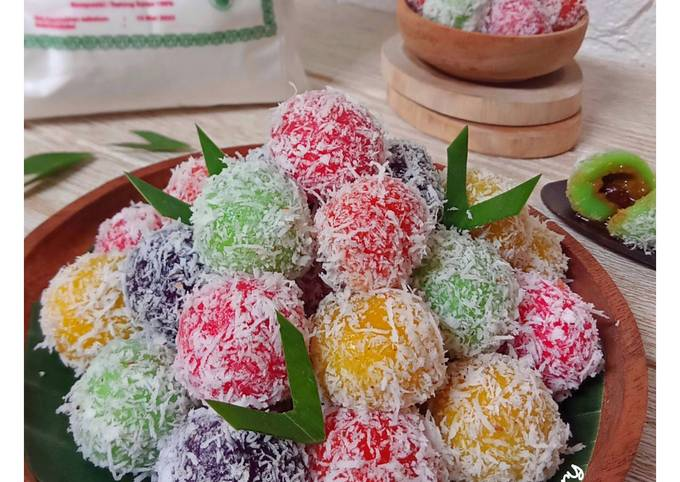
A modern version of the kue/kuih features colours inspired by the rainbow

While traditional form of this glutinous rice sweet remains relatively consistent across Indonesia, Malaysia, Brunei and Singapore, with glutinous rice flour, palm sugar filling, and grated coconut, numerous contemporary variations have emerged in response to evolving tastes and culinary creativity. Some versions replace the rice flour base with mashed sweet potato or yam, while others use alternative fillings such as chocolate, cheese, red bean paste or mung bean.

Other adaptations incorporate ingredients such as Oreo, bolognese and salted egg yolk, reflecting the influence of modern snacking trends and fusion cuisine. In some cases, the grated coconut coating is substituted with toppings like shredded cheddar cheese. Colourful versions made with food colouring or potato-based dough have also gained popularity, particularly among children.

The characteristic flavour combination of pandan, coconut and palm sugar, have also been incorporated into modern baked goods and fusion desserts.

== See also ==
- Kue
- Indonesian cuisine
- Javanese cuisine
