= A Goldsmith in His Shop =

Painting by Petrus Christus

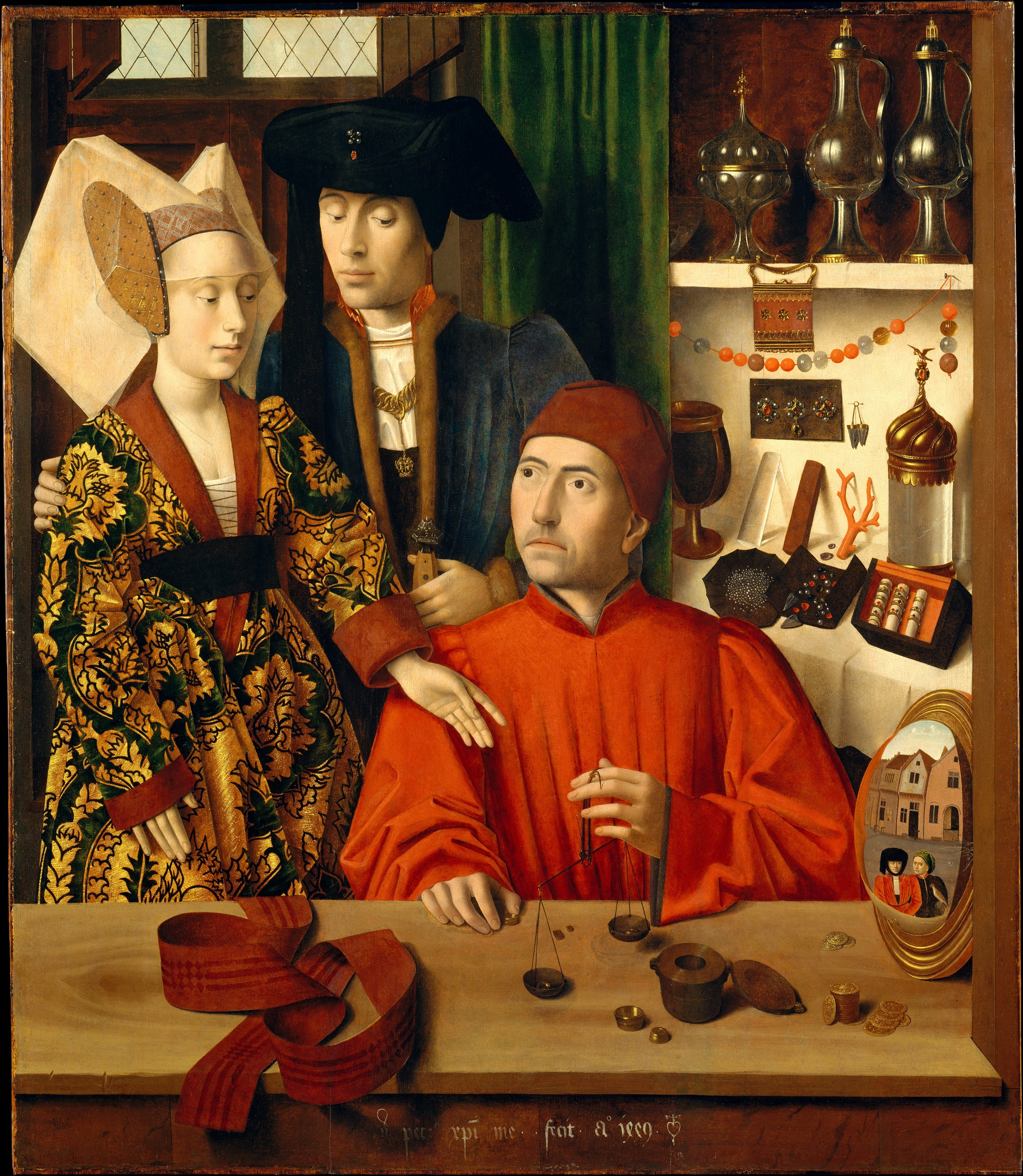
- Artist: Petrus Christus
- Year: 1449 (Julian)
- Medium: oil paint
- Movement: Early Netherlandish painting
- Dimensions: 98 cm (39 in) × 85.2 cm (33.5 in)
- Location: Metropolitan Museum of Art
- Owner: Albert von Oppenheim, Robert Lehman, Yves Perdoux

A Goldsmith in His Shop is a 1449 painting by Petrus Christus, a leading painter in Bruges in modern Belgium. It is now in the Metropolitan Museum of Art. This is an oil painting on an oak panel that measures 100.1 x 85.8 cm (39 3/8 x 33 3/4 inches) overall and the painted surface is 98 x 85.2 cm (38 5/8 x 33 1/2 inches). An inscription at the bottom of the painting states "m petr[vs] xpi me· ·fecit·ao 1449· (Master Petrus Christus made me in the year 1449)". In addition, the inscription has an emblem of a clock with a mechanical linkage to a heart, Christus's emblem.

This painting is among the best known of the artist's work and a masterpiece of Northern Renaissance. It was possibly commissioned by the goldsmith's guild of Bruges as an advertisement.

In some sources, the title of the painting is A Goldsmith in His Shop, Possibly Saint Eligius (the patron saint of goldsmiths). The presence of a halo over the goldsmith's head suggested Saint Eligius. Later, it was determined that the halo was added after the work was painted and it was removed.

Petrus Christus worked from 1444 and died in Bruges in 1475 or 1476.

== Composition ==
Maryan Ainsworth titles the painting Saint Eligius. Saint Eligius is unique among the Christus' paintings in that it has an interesting inscription. The inscription, 41 • petr xpi me • • fecit • a° 1449 •, is followed by a heart-shaped mark. The inscription uses the Burgundian batarde script, a style used on guild tablets of goldsmiths and manuscript illuminators. The notation preceding the name means the master's title and shows Christus's training. Although worn, the inscription has been characterized as beautifully executed. It is completely original. It coordinates with the lighting of the painting where on the left the signature is fainter as it is shadowed by the marriage girdle. It becomes brighter on the right.

While this painting is among the best known of the artist's work, it may also be the most puzzling. Some have suggested it is an actual wedding portrait. Max J. Friedlander proposed that the painting is simply of an ideal bridal couple. According to Panofsky, this explanation is consistent with a painting commissioned by a goldsmiths' guild to advertise its services to the community, particularly its participation in the sacraments of the church. in addition, the large size of the work suggests that it was too large for private use but was for public display.

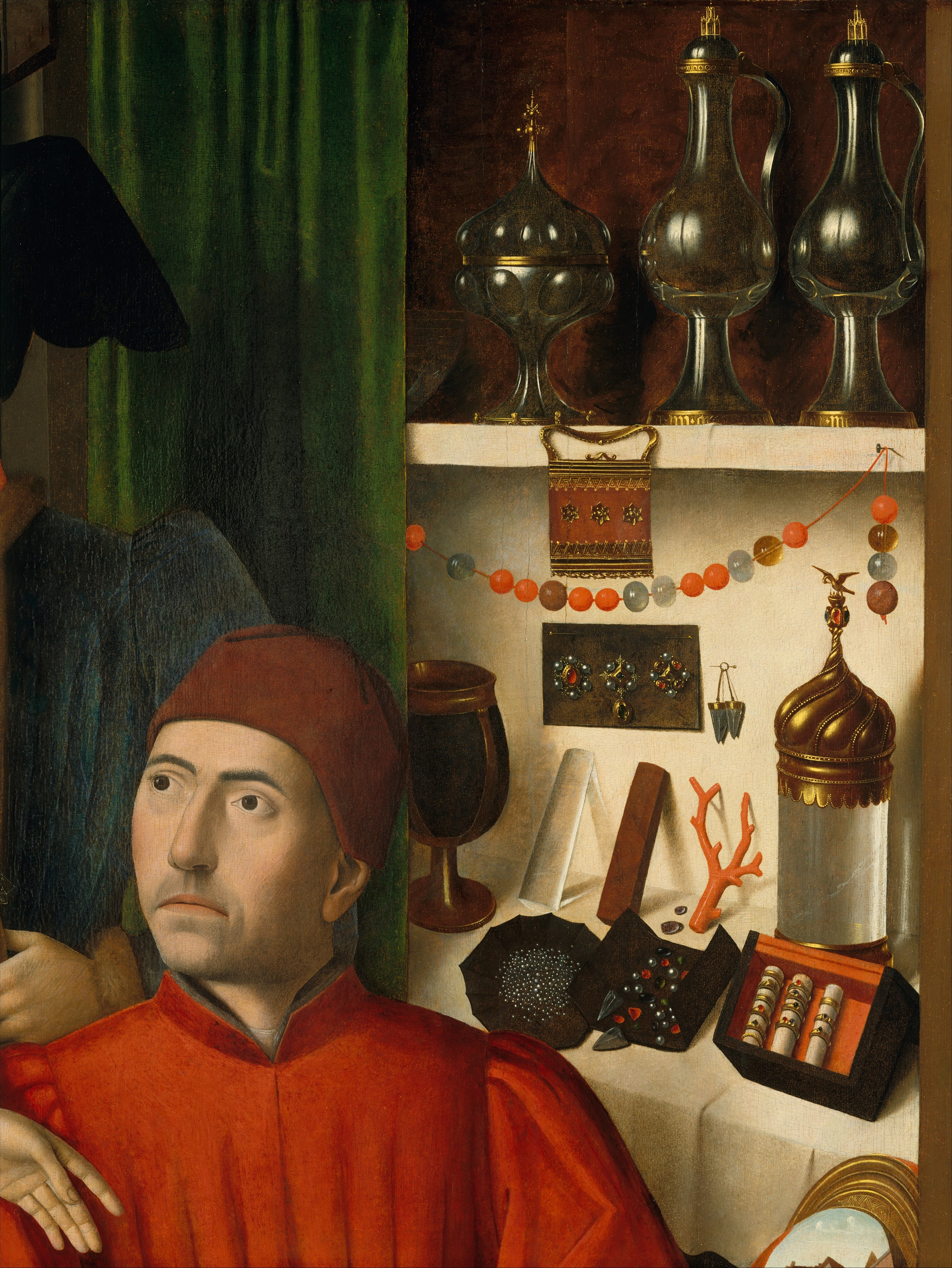
A Goldsmith in his Shop

The painting includes many details. On the right side hanging on the wall the artist included some diverse objects. One of the objects is a pair of fossilized shark's teeth intended to represent "serpents' tongues". They were supposed to change color when put into poisoned liquids or foods. The teeth were combined with coral in decorative pieces to ward off evil. They would be an advertisement to present the secular and religious services of gold and silversmiths to the community. In addition the painting shows the raw materials and finished work of the trade. The raw materials are the coral, crystal, porphyry, seed pearls, precious stones, and beads while the finished brooches, rings, and a belt buckles represented products of the trade. On a shelf, immediately to the (viewer's) right of the goldsmith's head is a coconut cup mounted in silver.

Two men are reflected in the mirror on the workbench. One carries a falcon, a symbol of greed and pride. The mirror is an attribute of Superbia, referring to pride and vanity and one of the Seven Deadly Sins. An alternative view is suggested by the devout couple and the goldsmith/saint. The goldsmith has scales tipped toward the righteous, the couple, and may be indicating that the couple's virtue outweighs the vices of the men in the mirror.

== Artist ==
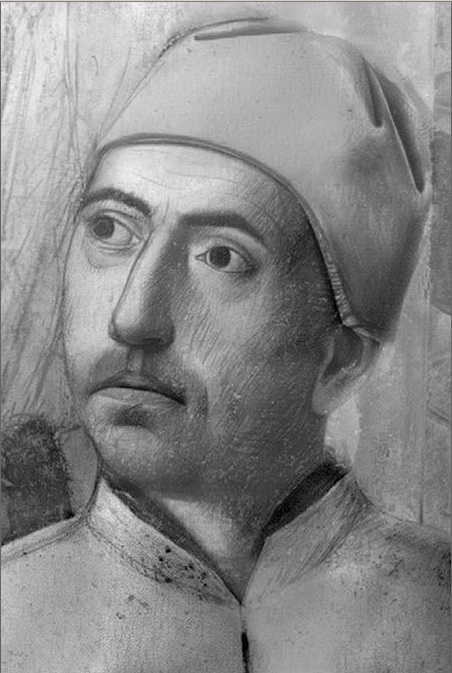
Underlying drawing

This painting is a masterpiece of Northern Renaissance art. After Jan van Eyck, Christus was the leading painter in Bruges, which is located in Flanders.

He was born in 1410 in Baerle on the Dutch/Belgian border. Christus obtained his citizenship about three years after van Eyck’s death. Scholars assume he managed van Eyck’s workshop for the three years then working independently as a free citizen. As a free citizen he could be accepted in the Guild of St. Luke, also known as the corporation of image-makers.

There were three ways of becoming a free citizen. He could marry a citizen of Bruges. He also could live in the city for a year and a day. Or finally, he could buy his citizen rights. According to records from the Poorterboek (burgher's lodge) in the town of Bruges in 1444 he bought his citizenship for three pounds on July 6 that year. His citizenship classified him as a free citizen so he could be accepted in the Guild of St. Luke and could sell his work.

In 1462–63 he and his wife became members of the Bruges Confraternity of Our Lady of the Dry Tree (referring to infertility of the Virgin's mother, Saint Anne). Membership reflected the very high social status its artist-members had achieved. Christus was respected and served as a member of the confraternity board. Royal and upper class members included Phillip the Good and Philip the Handsome as well as important people from other countries. As evidence of his elevated status, Christus received important commission from the Bruges city magistrate.

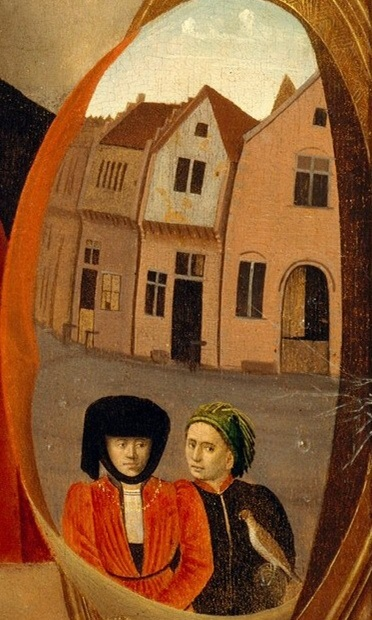
The mirror

The records of the Confraternity suggest that he died in 1475-76.

== Attribution ==
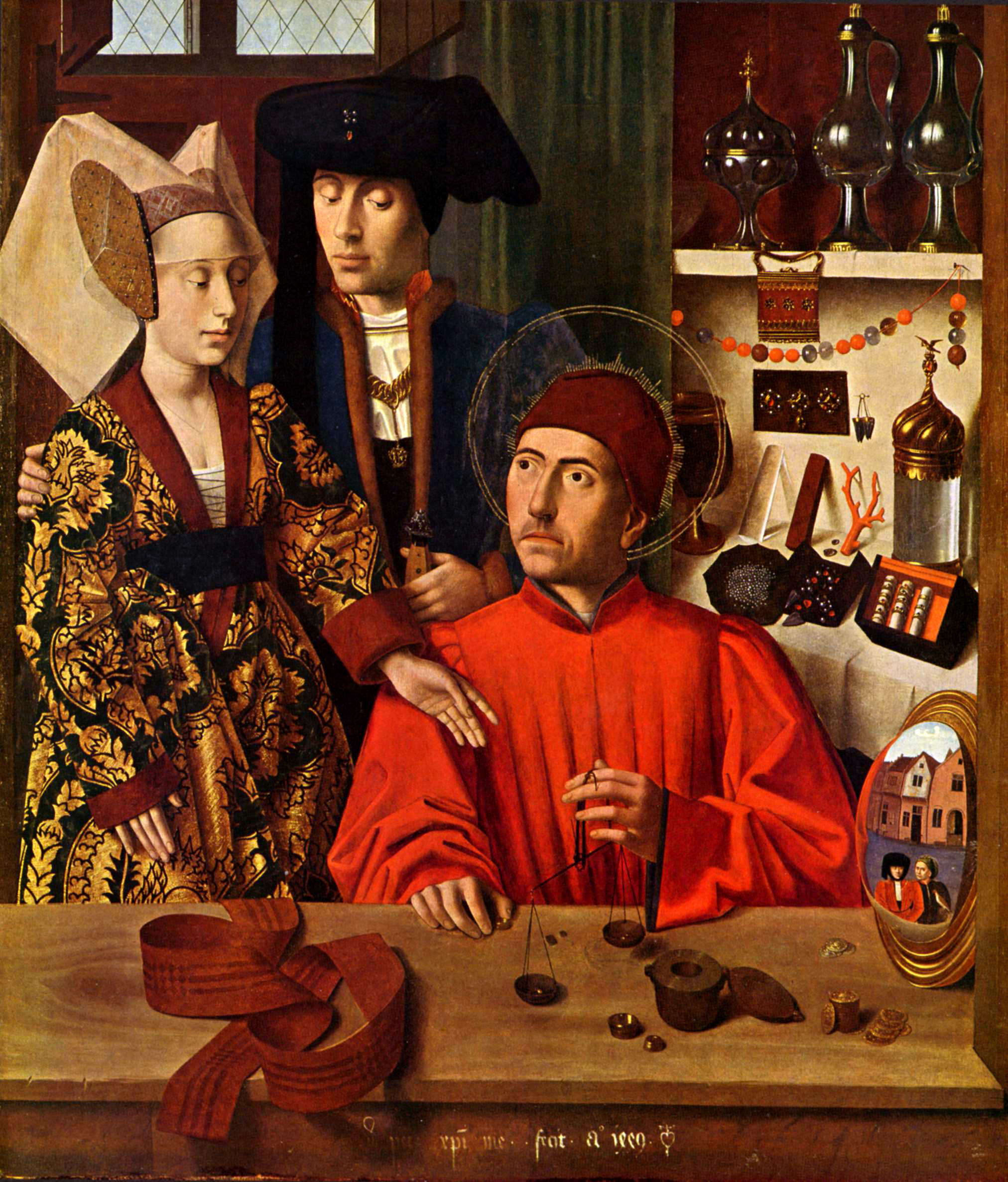
Before removing the halo

In the past the figure at the workbench was thought to be Saint Eligius, the patron saint of goldsmiths, due to the presence of a halo and the seated person being a goldsmith. In 1993, the halo was recognized as a later addition and removed. In 1998, Martha Wolff and Hugo van der Velden each observed that the painting had none of the common aspects of a saint. Often, he is portrayed doing miracles and the goldsmith is not; he is working at his craft. They were able to convince others that the connection of the goldsmith with Saint Eligius occurred in modern times. Early commentaries refer to the painting as showing a goldsmith at his bench. Only starting in 1817 was the sitter characterized as “a goldsmith or rather the patron of goldsmiths—Saint Eligius.” The halo may have been added then when a new gold frame was added to the painting.

Others have suggested that there is no reason to believe that the goldsmith is St. Eligius. The expensively dressed young couple are individualized and appear to be the goldsmith’s desired customers.

The Dutch art historian Hugo van der Velden thinks the main figure may be the famous goldsmith Willem van Vleuten, goldsmith to Phillip the Good, who by then lived in Bruges.

== Historical context ==
In 1435 Duke Philip the Good of Burgundy entered into a treaty to end the conflict between the Burgundians and the French. Starting then Philip created a strong central government in part by limiting the authority of the larger cities under his control, including Bruges.

In July 1436, Bruges and other cities helped Phillip in his siege of some cities. About the same time, several merchants in Sluis, the port used by Bruges, were killed. The merchants were trade partners between the Netherlands and England and thus important to trade with England. After the murders, trade with England was stopped, resulting in unemployment and loss of income from exported wool and a shortage of food supply from English wheat.

Leaders in Bruges tried to expand their control over the city. In an effort to regain control, Philip the Good laid siege to Bruges in May 1437. A famine resulted from the failure of the wheat crop in the region and the lack of wheat from England. When the plague arrived in June 1437 and killed one-fifth of the city population, the city surrendered and pledged its allegiance to Philip.

For the next 40 years the city was loyal to its sovereign, Phillip the Good. Petrus Christus began his active period during these 40 years. The economy thrived between 1440 and 1473 so the market for Christus' art was strong in Flanders during these years. By the 1400s Bruges was an important center for producing illuminated psalters. Of all the Netherlands, artists from Bruges created the largest number of illuminated manuscripts.

== Provenance ==
The painting may have been painted for the Bruges's goldsmith's guild. The first known owner was A. Merli in Breman, Germany. On September 11, 1815 he sold it, lot 144, at Frankfurt am Main. For a time it was in the possession of Silberberg. It was obtained by Gerhard Seibel, Elberfeld. He lent it to the Central-Museum zu Dusseldorf. It is next shown with Salomon Oppenheim the younger in Cologne and then by his grandson, Albert, Freiherr von Oppenheim of Cologne. He sold it to Rudolf Lepke, Berlin, lot 6, on March 19, 1918 Busch, Mainz. It passed through the hands of Y. Perdoux, Paris. In 1920 it was acquired by Philip Lehman from Perdoux. In 1975 it was transferred to the Metropolitan Museum of Art by Robert Lehman, son of Phillip.
