= Coconut cup (Hans van Amsterdam, Metropolitan Museum) =

Cup with cover
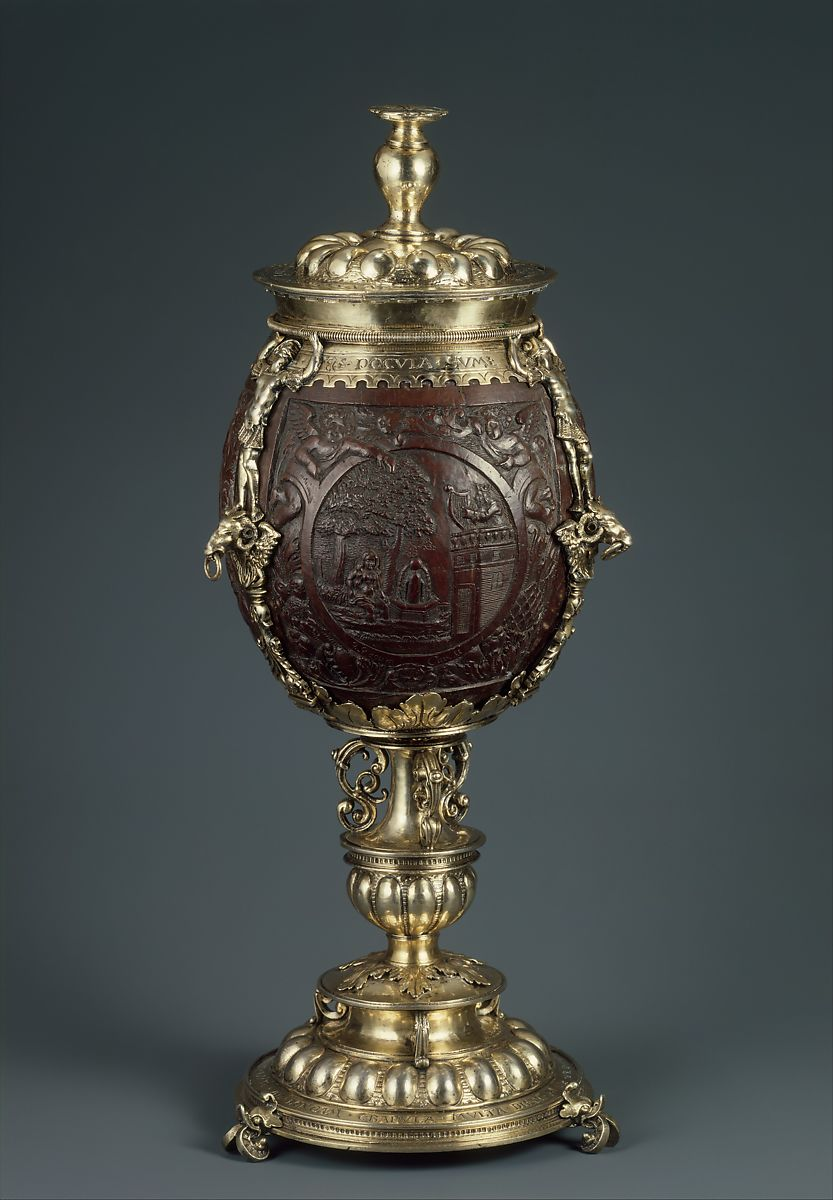
- Artist: Hans van Amsterdam
- Year: 1533 - 1534
- Medium: Silver gilt, coconut shell
- Dimensions: 10 7/8 × 3 7/8 in. (27.6 × 9.8 cm)
- Weight: 1.43 lb, 0.65 kg
- Location: Metropolitan Museum of Art, New York

Among the twelve coconut cups appearing in the Metropolitan Museum of Art's online database, one of the most ornate is the "Cup with Cover" by Hans van Amsterdam, a highly decorated silver gilt cup of 1533-34, with a coconut shell forming the bowl. In this period coconuts were exotic and expensive objects, to which medical or even magical powers were attributed when used as cups. They were one of a number of substances (including rhinoceros horn) claimed to have the power to detect or neutralize poisons.

The cup entered the museum in 1917, as part of a gift by J. P. Morgan.

Like many German and Netherlandish coconut cups, the nut is carved in relief with Old Testament subjects:

- GENESIS: C:19 (Lot and his Daughters)
- IVDICVM C:14 (Samson and the Lion)
- 2 Regum Cap II (David and Bathsheba) (illustrated)

There are additional inscriptions on the dangers of excessive drinking:

On edge of cover: inscription in Greek Letters: "Often in floods of wine a man is wrecked"
Below lip: POCVLA SVME / FLVET MELIVS POST POCVLA SERMO ("quaff your cups; after cups speech flows more readily")
On rim of foot: MMODIC[us] LAEDIT CEV DIRA CICVTA LVAEVS NON FACIT AD LONGAM CRAPVLA MVLTA DIEM ("wine immoderately drunk is as harmful as the deadly hemlock; frequent surfeit does not for a long life")

Struck marks on foot:

1. Crown on top ('s-Hertogenbosch town mark, beginning 1503/4);
2. (date letter "g", 1533/34);
3. Stylized star flame (maker's mark of Hans van Amsterdam, recorded 1535–65)
4. Engraved under foot: 14 omin Z (weight of piece?)

== Old Testament coconut cup ==
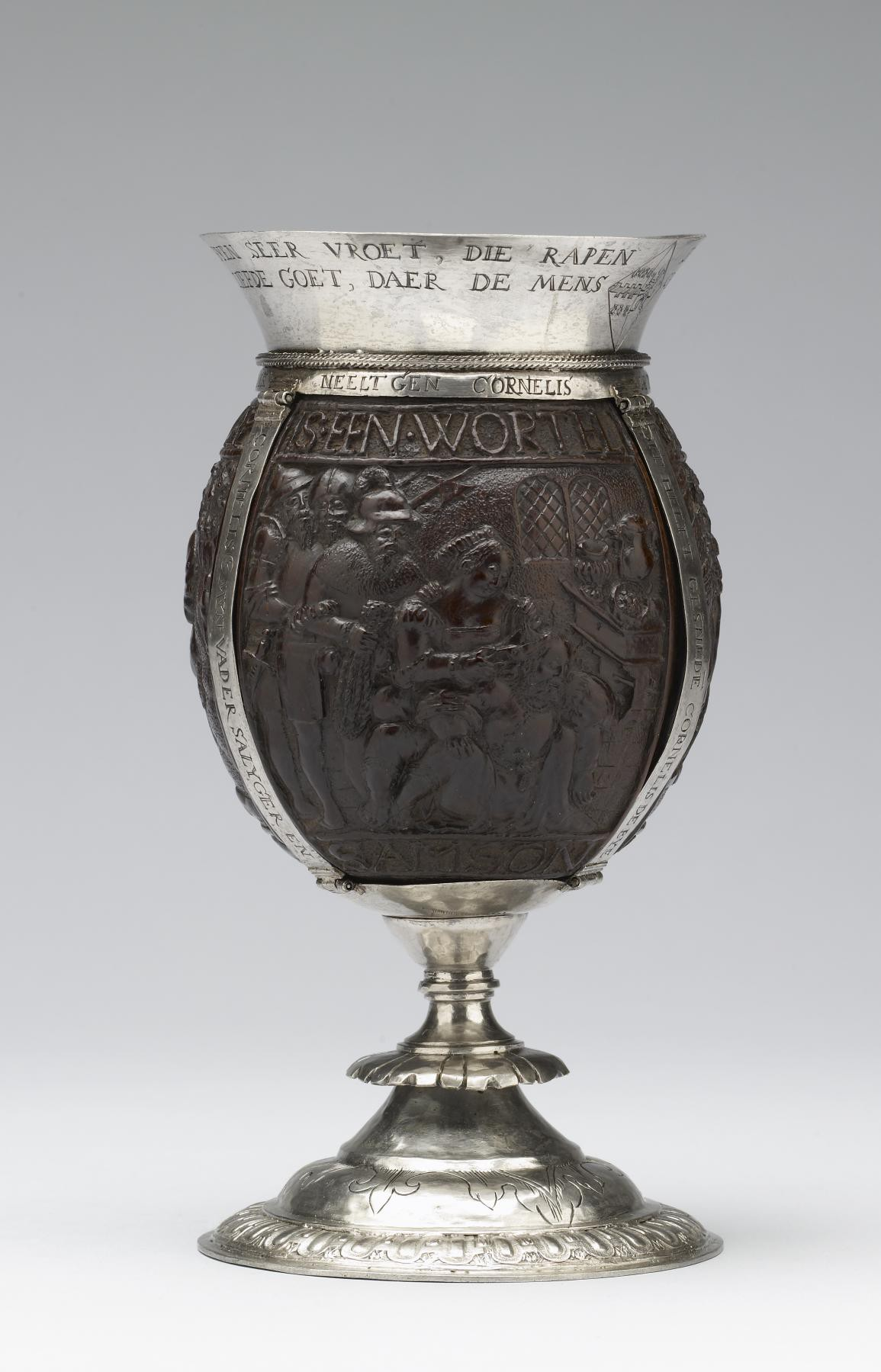
Coconut cup with Old Testament

A cup in the Walters Art Museum in Baltimore was created by Cornelis de Bye in 1598. This piece features scenes from the Old Testament carved on a coconut sourced from Africa and the East Indies. The coconut is mounted on a silver base.

The relief scenes show Old Testament stories of people unable to resist temptation: Susannah and the Elders, Lot and his daughters, and Samson and Delilah.
