= Kava cup =

In Fijian traditions and ceremonies, a kava cup, also called a bilo, is used to serve kava and yaqona. The Samoan name for this cup is tauau or generally, ipu tau ʻava ('ava cup). It is called "apu" in Hawaii.

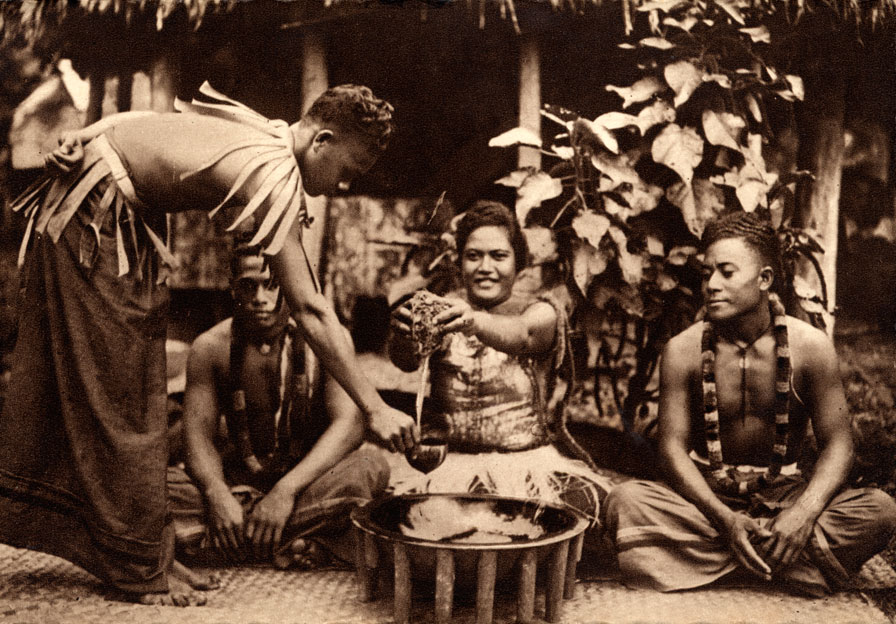
Kava ('ava) makers (aumaga) of Samoa. A woman seated between two men with the round tanoa (or laulau) wooden bowl in front. Standing is a third man, distributor of the 'ava, holding the coconut shell cup (tauau) used for distributing the beverage.

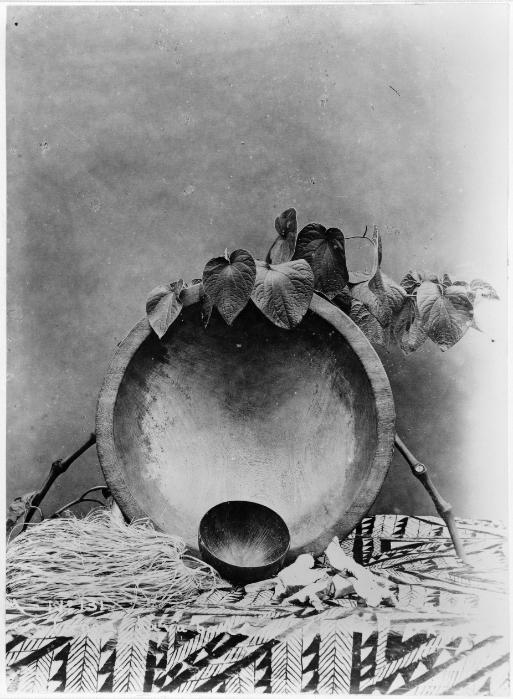
Tanoa bowl on its side, coconut shell drinking cup (ipu 'ava), leaves of the kava plant and strainer

The coconut shell cup used for distributing the 'ava in a ʻava ceremony is made from the half shell of a ripe coconut that has been cleaned and polished. It is sometimes ornamented with different designs, and after early European contact it was sometimes decorated with inlaid silver.

== See also ==
- Coco chocolatero, the coconut shell cup of the Americas
- Coconut cup
- Kava culture
