= Coco chocolatero =

Drinking vessel for hot chocolate

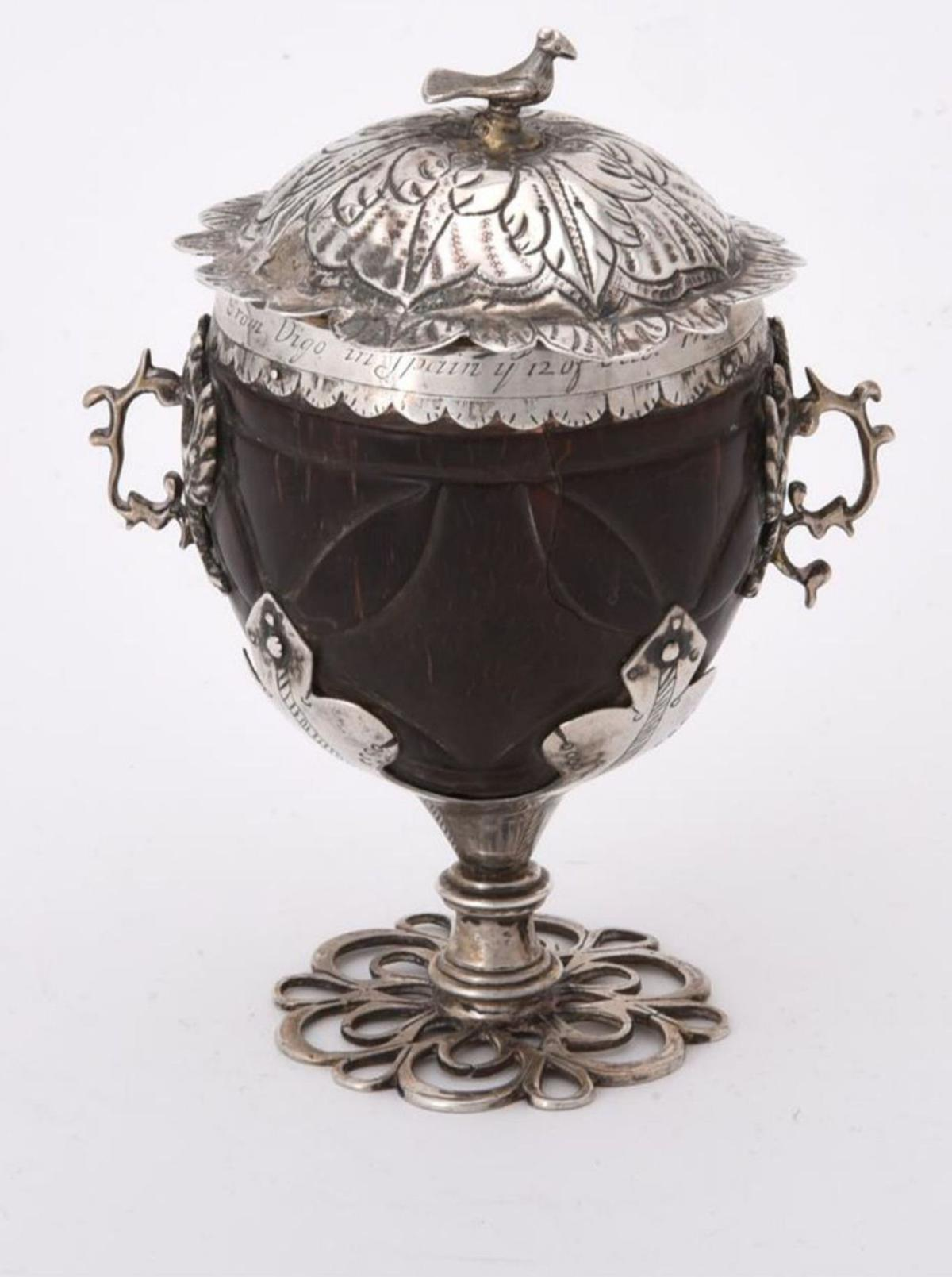
The Vigo Coconut (El Coco de Vigo). Dated 1680–1690, with inscription dated to 1702.

The coco chocolatero was a type of cup used to serve hot chocolate that developed between the 16th century and the 19th century in both the Viceroyalties of New Spain and the Viceroyalty of New Granada, which included modern-day countries of Mexico, Guatemala, Nicaragua and Venezuela. The cup was made of a carved and polished coconut shell, hence its name. Unlike its European counterparts coconut cups, like mazers, these cups were not used for wine but were instead accompanied by a set of accessories specifically designed for the consumption of chocolate, such as silver spoons and silk handkerchiefs.

== Elaboration ==
During the Viceroyalty of New Spain, the elaboration of this object was possible thanks to the adaptation of the natural coconut palms from the Pacific Islands in other territories. The hard shells of the coconuts were cleaned and cut to be polished. Then, the shells were carved with a burin, decorated with lavish geometric figures, and mounted in complex polished silver works.

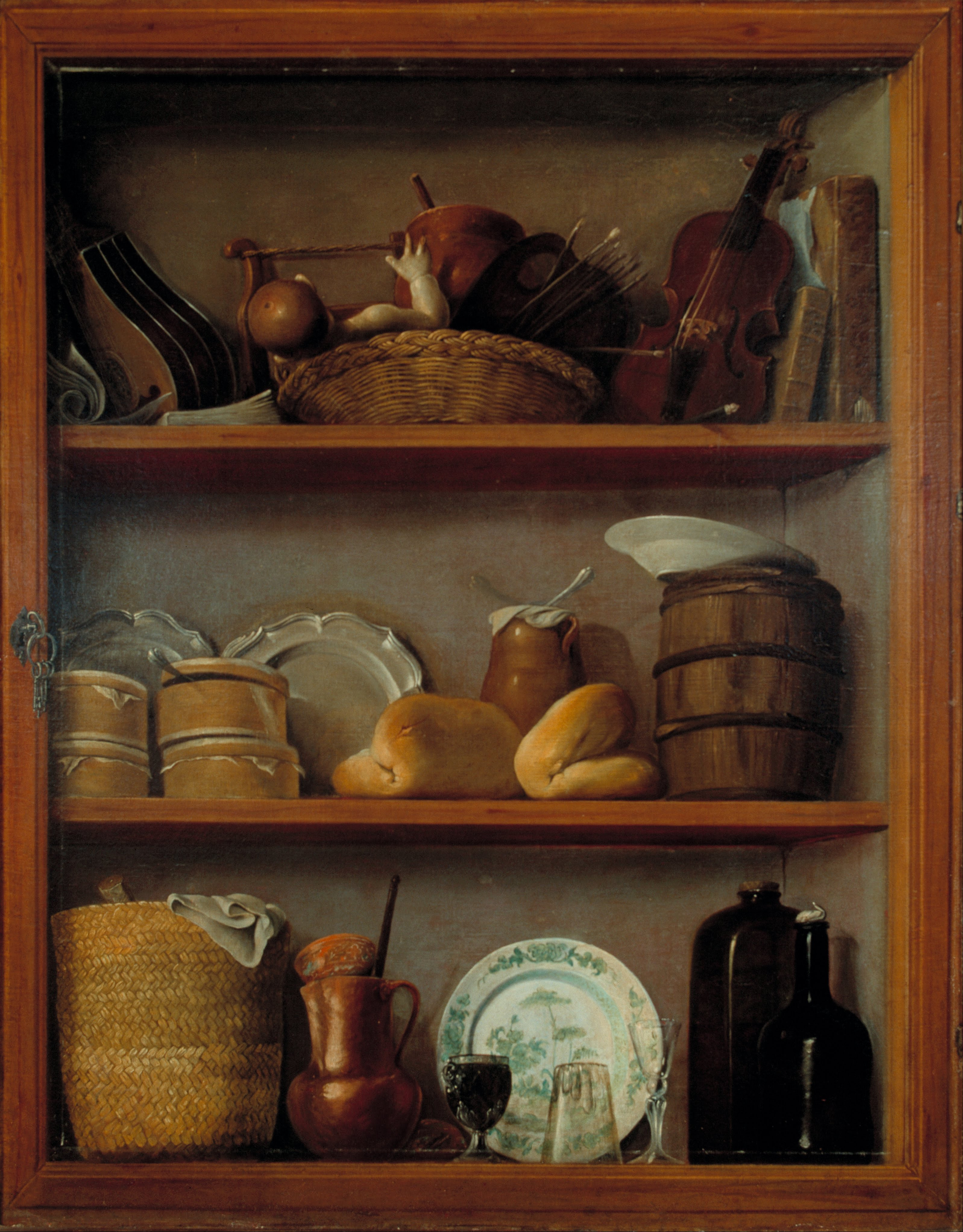
Antonio Pérez de Aguilar’s Alacena (Cupboard), oil on canvas c. 1769. The coco chocolatero is at bottom centre. Antonio Pérez de Aguilar. Museo Nacional de Arte.

The process of elaboration was carried out in two phases. First, the coconut was curved and decorated with metal, shell and semiprecious stone applications. Later, the object was mounted in silver, forming a pedestal where the name of the owner, the year, and the place of the manufacturer was written. These objects were manufactured in the Americas and different places of Europe, including Germany, Spain and France.

The popularization of the coco chocolatero recipient is related to the transformation of the cocoa consumption during the Hispanic period of America, mostly associated to the use of sugar as a sweetener. The maize dough (or masa) of the beverage was also substituted by milk, a variation much closer to the current chocolate drink. This change boosted the use of the coco chocolatero as a luxury item.

== The Vigo Coconut (El Coco de Vigo) ==
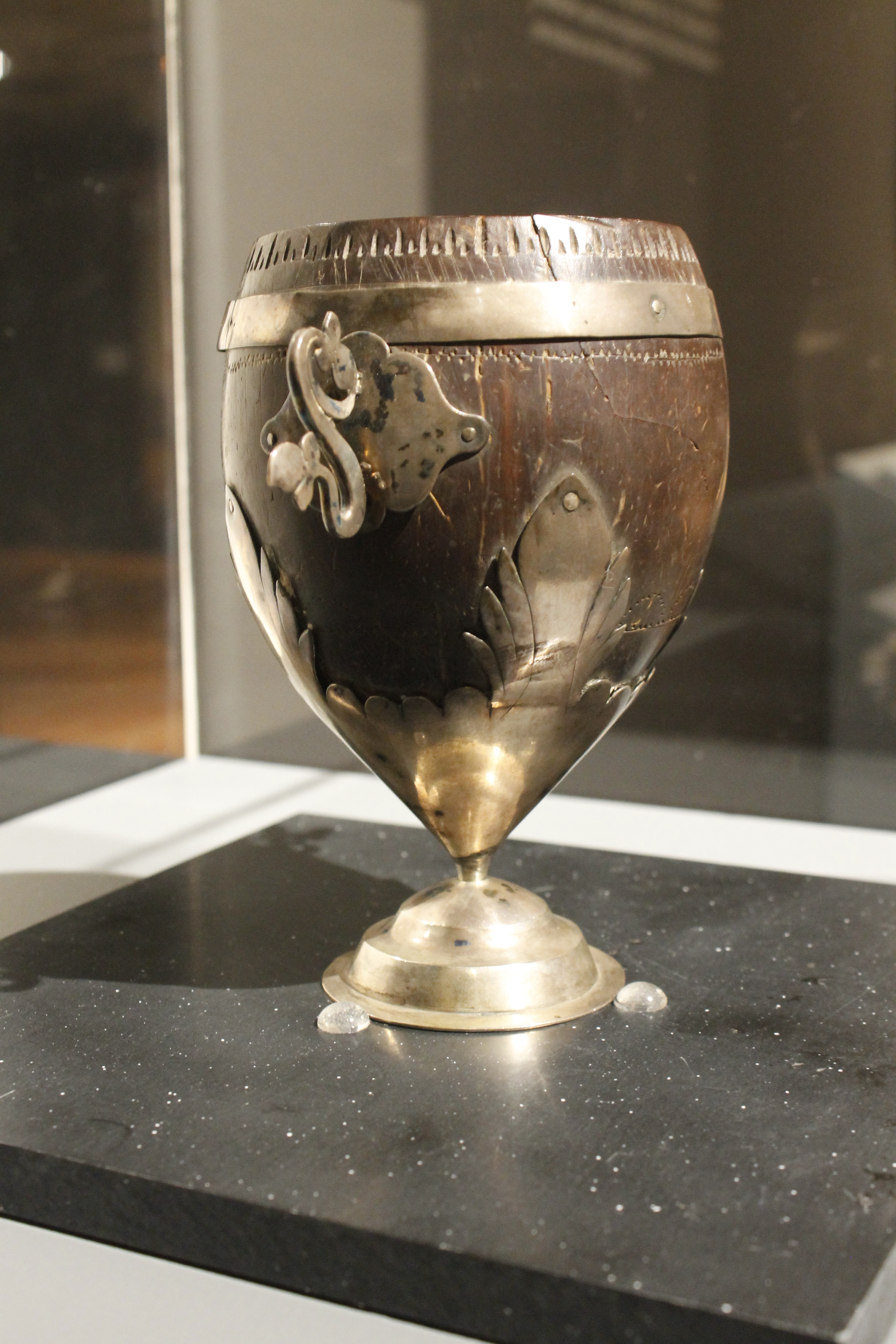
The coco chocolatero cup was used in some countries during the colonial period in the Americas.

One of the most remarkable examples of coco chocolatero is the Vigo Coconut, named after its association with the silver shipment sent from Veracruz to Spain via the West Indies Fleet in 1702—a fleet partially captured by the Royal Navy during the Battle of Vigo Bay that same year. The cup became part of the British booty and a commemorative inscription in English was later added. This coco is currently the oldest documented example with a date (1702), although it is possible that it may be even older. This object not only serves a crucial function as an artistic reference for dating other artifacts from the same period but is also of singular importance as it is the sole documented object from the aforementioned naval battle and the valuable spoils of war.

A similar coco chocolatero, with an inscription commemorating the taking of the booty is at the Victoria and Albert Museum. In this case, the cup was taken from the French ships Louis Erasmus & Marquese D'Antin in 10 July 1745 by British privateers during the War of the Austrian Succession.

== See also ==
- Coconut cup
- Coconut shell cup
