= Fijian traditions and ceremonies =

Fijian tradition and ceremony is a way of life that has evolved as the Fijian nation has modernised over time, with various external influences from Pacific neighbours, and the European and Asian society. This general overview of various aspects of Fijian tradition, social structure and ceremony, much of it from the Bauan Fijian tradition although there are variations from province to province, uses "Fijian" to mean indigenous Fijians or I Taukei rather than all citizens of Fiji, and the Fijian terms are most often of the Bauan dialect. Many social intricacies depend on one's inherited social position and the occasion one is confronted with: each will have a particular social etiquette.

== Social structure ==
Traditionally, each Fijian villager is born into a certain role in the family unit or Tokatoka. Various heads of the family will administer and lead the family unit within the village community. Each chief of the village will in turn lead the people to fulfill their role to the Vanua.

Each village will have several family units / Tokatoka which are part of one clan or Mataqali. Several Mataqali will make up the larger tribe or Yavusa. Several Yavusa will belong to a certain land mass and comprise thereby the Vanua (confederation of Yavusa) Dr Asesela Ravuvu (1983, p. 76) describes the Vanua as:

The living soul or human manifestation of the physical environment which the members have since claimed to belong to them and to which they also belong. The land is the physical or geographical entity of the people, upon which their survival...as a group depends. Land is thus an extension of the self. Likewise the people are an extension of the land. Land becomes lifeless and useless without the people, and likewise the people are helpless and insecure without land to thrive upon.

The Vanua is headed by a Turaga i taukei, the most prominent chief from the most prominent family. To explain further, a Vanua is the largest collective group of people associated with a particular territory or area of land. A Vanua is divisible into a group of Yavusa / tribes: a Yavusa is a group of Mataqali / clans: a Mataqali is a group of Tokatoka / family units. Within the Mataqali making up one Yavusa one Mataqali will be predominant and head that Yavusa as a whole. Similarly, one Tokatoka will head that Mataqali and one member of that Tokatoka will be Senior Chieftain / Turaga i Taukei of that Vanua.

Matanitu is a confederation of Vanua, not through ancestry or traditional ties, but rather by alliances formed politically or in war and/or united by a common need.

=== The feast and the club ===
Within the Fijian Bauan belief system, all Fijians fall into one of the two following categories which will indicate their position and role in the community:

1. Liga-ni-Magiti (hand of the feast) (8) - 3 Turaga (e.g. Ratu/Adi) positions); & 5 Bete {e.g. Matanivanua} positions.

2. Liga-ni-Wau (hand of the club) (7) - 3 Bati (e.g. Tora); 2 Matai (e.g. Daulevu); 2 Dau (e.g. Tunidau) positions.

The two categories are further divided into subcategories which are indicated by a number. There is Liga ni Magiti, which is category one and is indicated by the number 8 (Walu), which then has two subcategories; first 3, which is Turaga overall, containing the Ratu and the Adi (Fijian Royalty). These are considered born leaders and administrators. Then, secondly, subcategory 5 of Category 1 is the Bete - priests or heralds; these traditionally are the spokesmen, councillors, advisors of the land and the spiritualists.

Category 2, Liga ni Wau, is indicated by the number 7 (Vitu). Liga ni Wau has three subcategories. First there is 3, the Bati, traditionally Warriors, they are the wagers of war, the keepers of the peace, and the instruments of discipline on behalf of the Turaga. Then there is subcategory 2: Matai - a general term for skillful persons, (e.g. carpenters, craftsman, house or canoe builders). The last subcategory, 2 Dau, is the general term for an expert of some kind (e.g. dau-ni-vucu [Poet], dau-ni-yau [treasurer]). It is said socially, “Ke na Dau qori”, meaning “He is the expert”.

== Relationship terms within Fijian society ==
A first question generally in Fiji is “Where are you from?” so people may ascertain what relationship they hold with you and how will they interact with you. There are various relationship terms in Fiji. These include:

"Tauvu". Tau (friend); Vu (Spirit); having the same Vu, root or founder. Basil Thomson (1908:113) suggests “that groups in Fiji who are tauvu or kalou-vata ie worshippers of the same god, have a common origin”. 0 Tauvu are allowed reciprocal rights of taking each other's goods and coarse joking with each other, though this is not used inland in Viti-Levu. The following are some Tauvu groupings:

1. Lomaloma and Moturiki also to Yadrana village on Lakeba Island and also to Moala Island
2. Lomaiviti and Cakaudrove
3. Cakaudrove and Bua
4. Lakeba and Noco
5. Lau and Rewa
6. Cakaudrove and Tailevu
7. Ra/Nadroga/Kadavu/Ba
8. Macuata/Naitasiri
9. Serua/Kadavu
10. Nadroga/Kadavu
11. Nadi/Kadavu
12. Ono-I-Lau/Bau Island
13. Ono, Kadavu/Ono-I-Lau
14. Ono-I-Lau/Oneata

=== Other terms ===
"Tako-Lavo". This relationship relates to people of Colo from Inland Viti Levu e.g. Serua, Namosi areas, The meaning of Tako-Lavo is the Father {Tako} Son {Lavo} relationship. "Kaivata" or "Kai" may be used generally across the board to all Fijians, if they identify themselves within the same Province. "Kai-noqu" may be used when one Fijian is generally addressing another Fijian that they share the same blood somewhere in their lineage.

The term "Vasu" in Fiji refers to an individual's maternal ties to a village, Matagali etc. If a child is of a woman of rank he/she is a Vasu Levu to that particular area. If both mother and father are Fijian, he/she is a Vasu I Taukei. If both mother and father are Fijian and both are of a very senior chiefly rank from respective areas, then the child's Vasu connection is referred to as Turaga na Vasu. Intermarriage through the Vasu was used to expand kingdoms and unite old enemies or strengthen family links.

=== An example ===
If a Fijian was Kai Rewa and Vasu i Lau (paternally from Rewa District of Rewa Province and maternally from Lakeba, Lau), then he/she would be considered from Rewa, which is of the Burebasaga confederacy and Lakeba of the Lau Province, which is of the Tovata confederacy. With respect to his/her matrilineal side, being that of Lakeba, Lau Province of Tovata, the following applies:

If he/she were to take his/her father's side and purely acknowledge his/her lineage from Rewa Tikina, Rewa Province, of the Burebasaga confederacy the following would apply:

He/she would say "Naita" to those from Tailevu and Yasayasa Vakara and "Tauvu" to those from the Lau group.

== Relationships within the Fijian family ==
There is great intricacy of social interaction among families and close tribes, between brothers and sisters, cousins, uncles and the like. The Fijian concept of "family" does not align with the Western notion of a normative family. Extended family members will adopt roles and titles of a direct guardian. The iTaukei (Indigenous Fijians) culture is not based on biological lineage but instead on a child's link to a spiritual ancestor. This has proved to be somewhat of a hurdle when attempting to apply Western culture in a Fijian landscape, such as the use of a predominantly Western criminal justice system.

Megan Lee, in her paper Life in a Fijian Village while studying social structure and organization of Naivuvuni Village states: “The kinship system is an essential aspect of Fijian life. The ways in which people interact with each other is based upon how they are related to each other within the family unit. Respect and avoidance relationships are critical to the kinship system. Respect is based on three main concepts: age, sex, social distance and status. The older a person is, the more respect they command, regardless of sex or social rank. The amount of respect displayed also depends on the amount of social distance between people. People who interact with one another on a regular basis tend to be more relaxed and less strict about the proper respect relationships. People who do not see each other as often and are less familiar with each other follow the expected rules more stringently.”

The following terms (with variation between provinces) are used among close family members:

The term "Yaca" is used to refer to one's "namesake" when a child in memory of a relative who has passed on. Children are also named after a living relative. The term is even more loosely used today among friends if you share the same name, though this is not used in its correct context.

Anne E. Becker in her book Body, Self, and Society: the view from Fiji writes:

In the event that a kin relationship cannot be conjured from the meeting, the respective parties will invoke one of many other relationships that associate them in some way for instances they may be mutual namesakes (Yaca) or their respective regional ancestral spirits (Vu) May have been friends so by syllogism they are Tauvu and address each other as Tau.

The term "Tavale" is used by those who are cross cousins for example the son or daughter of a father's sister or mother's brother, both used for close and long distant relatives.

Megan Lee in her paper "Life in a Fijian Village", in Chapter 2, Social Structure and Organization of Naivuvuni Village, writes:

Traditionally, it was from this group of relatives that a man would choose his wife although today this practice is not usually followed. Male and female cross cousins refer to each other as tavale. Men also refer to female cross cousins as tavale and women call men by the same instead of using their real name. A woman refer to another female cross cousin as tavale and dauve to a brother or cousin's wife. Similarly, a female refers to her male cross cousin's wife as "karua", which means second wife. Cross cousins also have the responsibility of burying one another when they die.

Also William Halse Rivers in his book The History of Melanesian Society states:

In Fiji the term of the coastal people are determined by their cross cousin marriage, viz., Tavale, davola and da1tuve but among the mountain people there are number of other terms including daku, veitabui, vaidakavi, veilavi and vikila though Tavale of the coastal people is frequently used.

"Tata, Nana, Nei" and "Momo". Parents of cross cousins are respected because when a parent needs help the most immediate person to help would be his own sister or her own brother. Parents of cousins are treated the same as biological parents, a child's mother's younger sister is referred to as nana Lailai or little mother. If she is older than the child's own mother, then she is referred to as Nana levu or big mother. Likewise, the child father's brothers are called Tata Lailai and Tata Levu according to seniority.

A child's father's sister is referred to as Nei or aunt whereas a child's mother's brother is referred to as Momo. The relationship with the parents of one's cross cousins are relaxed but they are very respected while keeping in mind that respect must be shown Momo and Nei because they are the father's sister or mother's brother .

The above are but simple examples and further intricacies exist.

== Fijian ceremonies ==
Fijian social interactions are filled with ceremony of varying degrees. Depending on the occasion and situation, three key ceremonies, which accord with other cultures, are: birth, death, and marriage.

=== Births ===
Traditionally speaking, birthdays were not celebrated in Fijian society. However, there are some people's birthdays that have special significance. For example, the first birthday of the first-born child is often celebrated by both sides of the family. The father's side will bring mats that the child sits on during the feast and celebration, and then afterwards the mother's side takes them away and distributes them among themselves. The focus is, unusually, on the different groups and not the individual.

=== Engagement ===
A formal engagement (ai lakovi) involves the presentation of a tabua (whale's tooth) from a man to a woman.

=== Marriages ===
Arranged marriages are rarely practiced in modern Fiji. Traditionally however, a marriage would be arranged by the man's parents and senior members of his Mataqali and would have been based on the relationship that would be created between two clans. It was rarely about the individuals themselves.

Dr Asesela Ravuvu states in his book The Fijian Way of Life (1983, p. 45):

"Marriage was not just a union of two individuals, it was also the 'marriage' of the two groups, who thereby became socially and economically related to one another".

Megan Lee writes in her paper "Life in a Fijian Village":

The woman and man were used as tools to foster the social relations between the two groups. For a man and woman to marry from two groups that had no previous social or economic relationship was uncommon. Marriage was often used to reinforce a tie between two groups that had been united by a marriage several generations past.

Elopement has become more common but it does cause tension between the wife and her in-laws. If this happens, the following ceremony called Bulubulu (meaning "to bury") must be performed. This reconciles the two families, as it is viewed that the husband committed a theft of sorts. It is costly to perform bulubulu, and is generally not done until some years after the marriage. The wife may not return to her village until it is performed.

If all protocol is followed, the Tevutevu is performed. It involves both sides of the family, in which they present the couple with mats and other household practical items so they are able to begin their new home. While they are still part of a larger clan this symbolises that they are now a separate and independent family.

=== Deaths ===
When a death occurs, related clans and family come together in a religious and social gathering to share their sorrow and to reaffirm the connections between them.

The death has the "Reguregu", which is the lead-up to the burial, where all the friends and extended family come to pay their respects. The presentation etiquette utilises Mats, Yaqona and Tabua and varies from province to province. After several days of this the actual burial takes place and Mats and masi are placed over the grave site. The death is commemorated at the burial ceremony and again on the fourth and tenth nights thereafter. One hundred days after the death the mourning is lifted and the various Taboos, or in Fijian Tabu, are lifted from the family members in what is called the Vakataraisulu ceremony. The grave site is then cemented in. A further ceremony is held one year later. Each of the gatherings mentioned above include both the mother's and the father's sides being brought together.

These ceremonies are not as stringent today as in times past. Each province follows a similar pattern but with specific variations.

== Ceremonial items and etiquette ==
Items that will be shared generally across the Fiji group in ceremony and social interactions are Yaqona, Tabua, Mats, Masi, the following will discuss this in further details.

=== Yaqona ===
Yaqona is a cousin of the pepper plant. The root and stem are washed and dried thoroughly, then pounded into a powder to be mixed with water and filtered through a silk cloth. Before the introduction of silk special reeds were used.

Yaqona is a central and ancient part of Fijian ceremony. Whereas Yaqona was once only for use by priests (Bete), chiefs and elders, it is now consumed by all. The following outlines a Yaqona ceremony in the Bauan manner (Bau: a prominent island and village of the Kubuna Confederacy in the province of Tailevu).

Yaqona is consumed seated on a rectangular Pandanus mat. At one end is a Tanoa (wooden or clay mixing bowl). The front area has Magimagi (coconut fiber rope) and cowry shells attached to the Magimagi. This rope is laid out toward the chief, while next to the chief will be his spokesman and other senior men. Behind the Tanoa will generally be three people: one mixing and two to serve and gather water as needed.

Once the person mixing has all he needs in front of him, he will sit cross-legged and upright, touch the Tanoa and say, “Qai vakarau lose Saka Na Yaqona vaka Turaga” (I will respectfully mix the Yaqona for the Chieftain). After mixing, he takes the coconut shell bowl and fills it with Yaqona. He lifts it high and then lets the Yaqona pour back into the Tanoa so the Chief's herald can see the Yaqona. The herald, on seeing it is too sosoko (strong) will exclaim “Wai”. On hearing this the mixer will add more water and repeat the same action until he hears the herald say “Wai donu”. He then knows the Yaqona is a good mix and is ready to be served. He puts his hands together and circles the Tanoa with his hands, saying, “Qai darama saka tu na Yaqona Vakaturaga” (With respect the chiefs Yaqona is ready to drink). Then he cups his hands, claps three times and begins to serve the Yaqona in a Bilo (coconut shell cup). This will then be carefully taken to the chief in his personal bilo (all others will drink of the same cup). The chief will receive the bilo of Yaqona by cupping his hands and clapping with a deep, dignified sound. Then he will take his bilo and drink. As he is drinking everyone will clap in slow time, and when he is finished the herald will exclaim “Maca” and all will clap three times. The same will be repeated for the herald, but all will clap only twice when he is finished. For a time this process will be repeated, then once he feels it appropriate the herald will signal to the mixer to open the drinking of the Yaqona to everyone. He touches either side of the Tanoa and says “Taki vakavo Na Yaqona vaka Turaga” ( Now all may drink of the chiefs Yaqona) and will then clap twice. All will then be allowed to drink, following the order of seniority. If someone comes in the middle of drinking he must bring a small offering (sevusevu) of Kava/Yaqona as a sign of respect. He will announce himself with a respectful greeting and then the senior members drinking will invite him to join in. He will say a few words of respect when he places his Yaqona on the mat before the others. Then a member of the drinking party, generally the herald, will touch the Yaqona and say a few words ending with “Tarai Saka tu na sevusevu Levu” as an acceptance of the token of respect (Sevusevu) and the drinking session will continue along with the telling of many stories. Once the Tanoa is empty and the herald sees it fit to end the drinking session and not to mix again, he will signal to the mixer, who will then say: “Qai maca saka tu na Yaqona Vakaturaga” (respectfully to you all, the chiefly Yaqona is finished).

Among family and friend gatherings this etiquette is more loosely followed and dialect and social etiquette can vary from place to place.

=== Tabua ===
The Tabua is a whale's tooth and is a gift in ceremonial presentations. The greater number of teeth presented the greater the gift. It is important for the presenter to always play down the offering, but those receiving will always talk up the offering: if it is small they will say it is great, the point is eloquence and humility.

=== Mats ===
Mats are generally rectangular and vary in design between provinces. They are made from the Pandanus plant, a saltwater marsh plant also found throughout the Pacific and South East Asia. The leaves are boiled, pounded with a heavy wooden mallet and then dried and rolled into bundles. They are then woven into mats of varying design. The colours are normally an earthy beige and black or brown with dyes used from the mangrove tree, though now, some modern materials are used such as coloured yarn to make frilled edges. The exchanging of mats has been common practice in all forms of Fijian ceremony from ancient times.

Masi is made from the bark of the mulberry tree. The outer layer is separated from the core of the stalk/stem and the dark outer bark is scraped off. The strips of fibre are placed on a wooden anvil like a low stool, or on any flat hard surface, and the fibre is beaten with wooden clubs, beating and folding it repeatedly until it is almost half a metre wide. Pieces are then overlapped and beaten at the joints to form larger pieces. The resulting cloth is dried in the sun.

The dyes, generally variations of earthy browns and blacks, are obtained from mangrove sap, terracotta clay and specially prepared soot. Masi can also be smoked over a sugarcane fire to produce the tan-coloured masi kuvui. The designs vary from province to province. The most famous and intricate designs are from the island of Vatulele. The Lau group is also renowned for its crafts and particularly for the art of making fine Masi. The finest white masi considered to originate from Tonga. The Masi can be used as a permanent decorative piece in a house or a temporary decorative piece at various ceremonies.

One of the uses of Masi is to wrap the newborn baby collected from hospital, while at the other end of the life cycle it decorates the room where the body lies before burial. It also covers the coffin, and is spread over the grave.

=== Other items ===
While Tabua, Yaqona, and Mats are crucial items in ceremony and social gatherings, many other items are also included; such as various root crops and now flour, bread, tinned foods, kerosene, soaps and the like for rural and distant areas. These help to meet physical needs whereas Tabua and Yaqona are items of respect and hold a spiritual significance.

== See also ==
- Culture of Fiji
- Religion in Fiji
