= Coconut cup =

Type of decorative cup

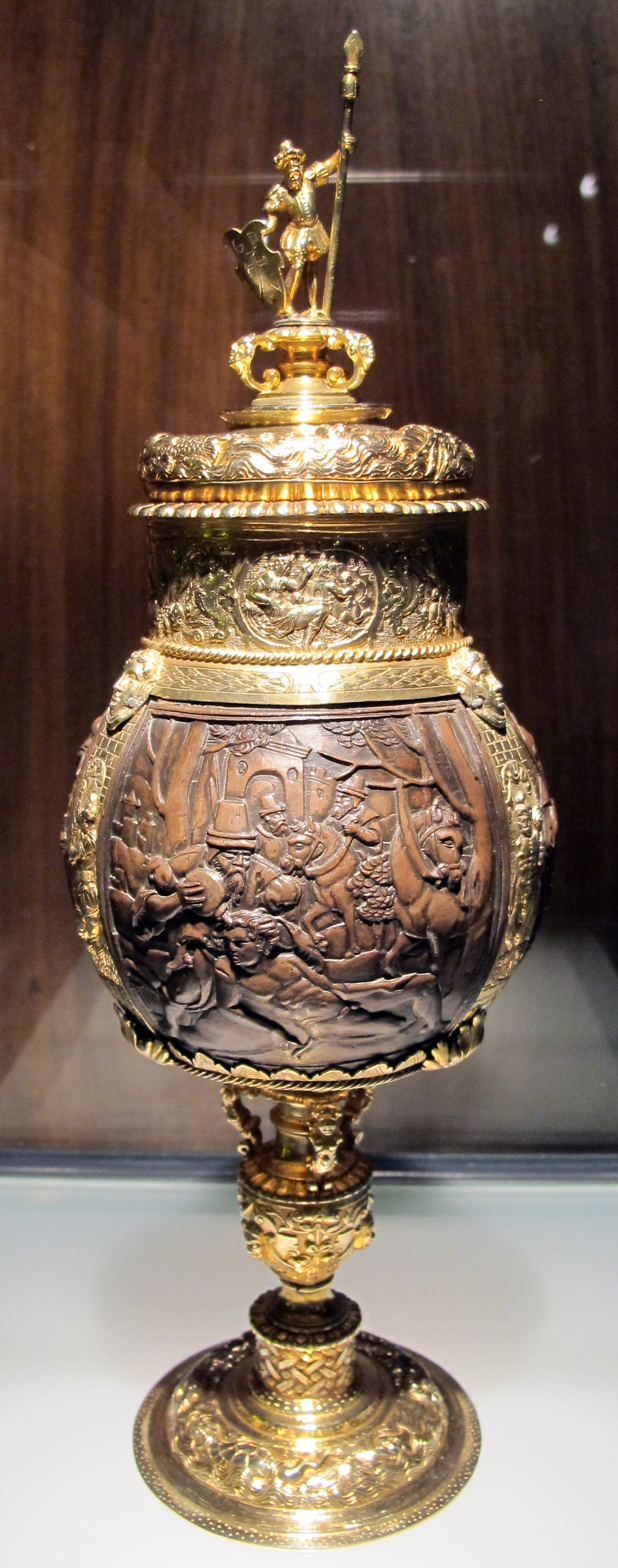
Carved coconut cup by Peter Strobel, c. 1580, Swiss?

A coconut cup is a showy form of cup typically intended for both use and display. The majority were produced and used in Western Europe in the late Middle Ages, especially during the Renaissance with something of a revival in Georgian Britain. They used a coconut shell as the bowl of the cup, and were mounted, typically in silver or silver-gilt, as a standing cup with a stem and foot, and usually a cover, which often included part of the shell. These metal parts were often very elaborately decorated, and the shell carved in relief.

Like the nautilus shell cup and ostrich egg cups, both popular in the same period, they reflect the curiosity aroused by the arrival during the Age of Discovery of exotic new things. Albrecht Dürer bought several coconuts on his visit to Antwerp in 1520; at this time they were probably carried from Africa on Portuguese ships. Coconuts were also referred to as the "Indian nut" or "nut of the sea", which Kathleen Kennedy prefers to take literally. She suggests typical medieval coconut imports to Europe passed from India to Aden, then Alexandria and Venice, blaming the German historian Rolf Fritz (in his 1983 book) for the African idea.

As well as merely being cleaned of fibres and polished, which all coconuts used as cups were, coconut shell can be carved in relief and many examples, especially from the late 16th century and the German-speaking world, are elaborately carved with crowded scenes, often either Biblical or military. Other mounted shells were used to form the body of animals such as wild boars in other fanciful objects.

As the Early Modern period went on, and intercontinental trade became common, coconuts became much cheaper, and were now an economical alternative to a silver cup bowl, with just the mounts in silver.

== Medicine and health ==
The belief had developed that the shells had medicinal, even magical, properties, which seems to have contributed to their lasting popularity, though there was a typical lack of consensus among medical writers as to precisely what conditions it helped. They were one of a number of materials believed to detect or make safe poisoned wine. Rather vague claims for their benefits to health continued to be made in the 17th century, for example by Nicolas de Blégny, one of Louis XIV's physicians, in his court-approved book of 1689, The Best Use of Tea, Coffee and Chocolate in the Maintenance of Good Health and the Cure of Disease. He promoted the drinking of all three of the recently introduced hot drinks for a wide range of health conditions, saying that coconut cups were the best type, better than porcelain.

== History ==
Coconut cups were known in the ancient world, although no examples have survived. The earliest reference to a coconut cup in England is in a will of 1254, but the earliest surviving English examples are from slightly before 1500, as with those in New College, Oxford, and Gonville and Caius, Cambridge. In 1508 New College owned seven coconut cups. In an inventory of 1532 of the stock of Robert Amadas, goldsmith to Henry VIII, there were "black nuts", valued at the same as silver-gilt by weight. The records of London's goldsmith's guild for the 14th and 15th centuries have several disputes arising from coconut cups being made by the wrong people, or with the wrong materials.

They were especially made in the German-speaking world, where they continued to be made well into the Baroque 17th century. One is shown in the painting A Goldsmith in his Shop, by Petrus Christus, 1449, set in Bruges (now Metropolitan Museum of Art). The "rather plain" coconut cup is on a shelf to the right of his head. Some appear among other luxurious objects in pronkstillevens ("ostentatious still-lifes") in Dutch Golden Age paintings, from about the 1640s onwards. There were older traditions of luxurious drinking cups with bowls in organic materials mounted in metal, especially the mazer type, often made of burr maple, giving somewhat similar decorative patterns in the wood when polished.

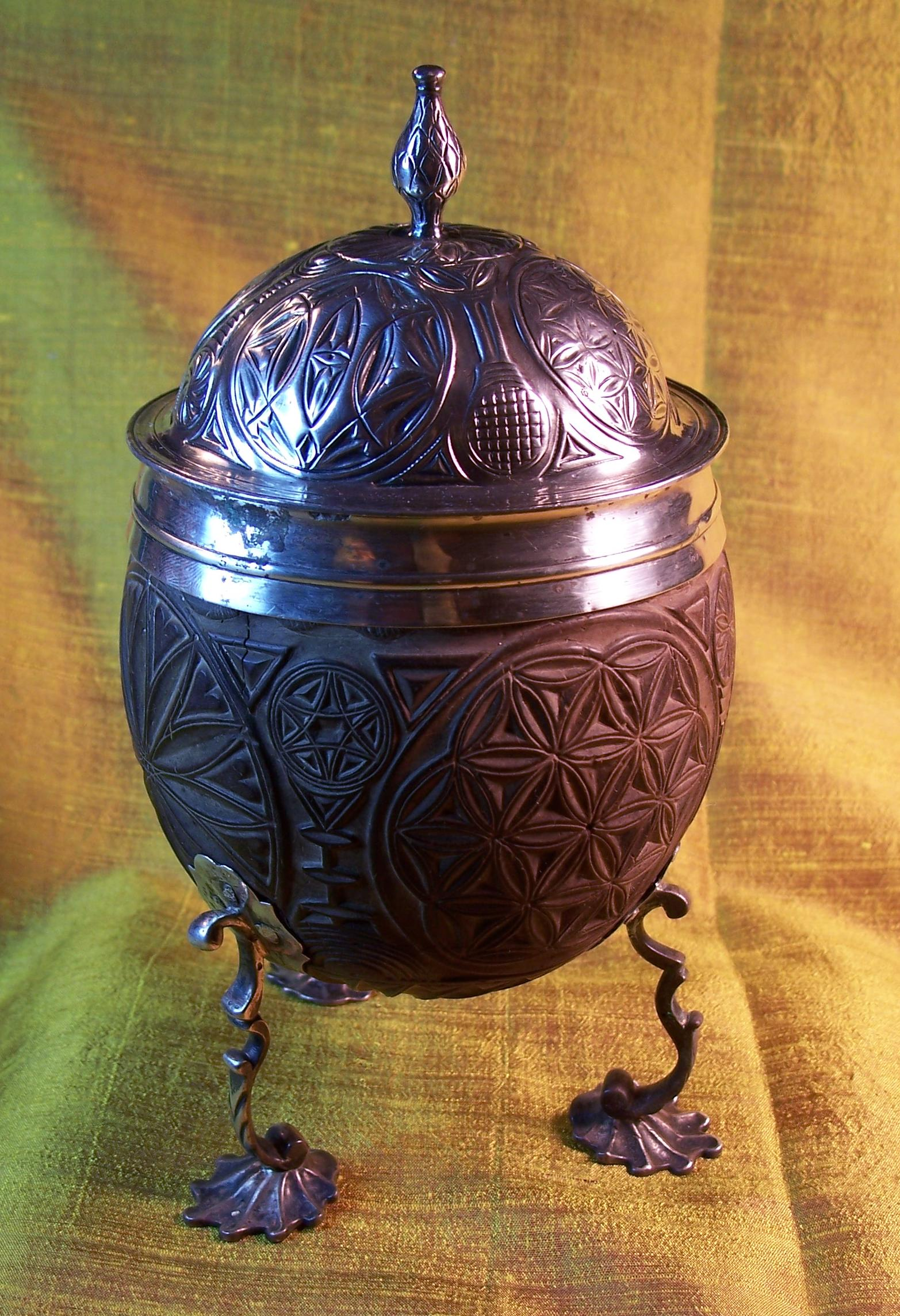
Coconut cup in silver, presented to Sir Richard Pearson in 1780 by the Royal Exchange Assurance

Some 17th-century cups were decorated with Brazilian or other tropical scenes, which has been connected to Dutch Brazil, a small and short-lived colony (1630–1654) or other areas of Dutch colonization of the Americas.

Coconuts presumably became much more easily available in England in the 18th century, helped by their spread to the New World in the early 16th century, and there are many cups, that are typically a good deal simpler, on a short stem and without much carving; very often the shell is just polished. By this stage a shell was cheaper than a bowl made of silver, which has contributed to a higher survival rate for coconut cups than those in precious metal, as they had a lower recycling value, and were less likely to be melted down. According to Kathleen Kennedy, "together, coconut cups and mazers are almost the only fifteenth-century plate to remain extant at Oxford and Cambridge colleges today".

A Georgian example in the National Museum of Scotland has a wooden stem and foot, the silver restricted to bands around the rim and bowl. It is inscribed "The prize of butts at Kilwinning made and sett out by Robert Fullarton of Bartanholme. Esqr. For the year 1746", a relatively economical sports trophy for a local shooting contest in Ayrshire, Scotland. They continued to be made in the 19th century, and into the 20th, with an extravagant Art Nouveau example of 1915 by the German metal artist Ernst Riegel that is now in the Germanisches Nationalmuseum in Nuremberg, Germany.

Coconut cups with the nut as the body of an owl, and the head removable for drinking were also sometimes given as prizes for Continental shooting contests (with a crossbow in early ones), as owls were in these released to get other birds to rise up and mob them, and be shot. Nuts also made the torsos of various other animals, mostly boars, to which heads and feet were added; animal-shaped cups were mostly a Germanic style.

The coco chocolatero is a mainly South American version, somewhat less expensive, mostly used for drinking chocolate.

There are traditional uses of the coconut shell cup in areas where the tree grows naturally. Modern Western examples, normally without stems or feet, are associated with "long" cocktails, and are often ceramic or plastic imitations of the nut form.

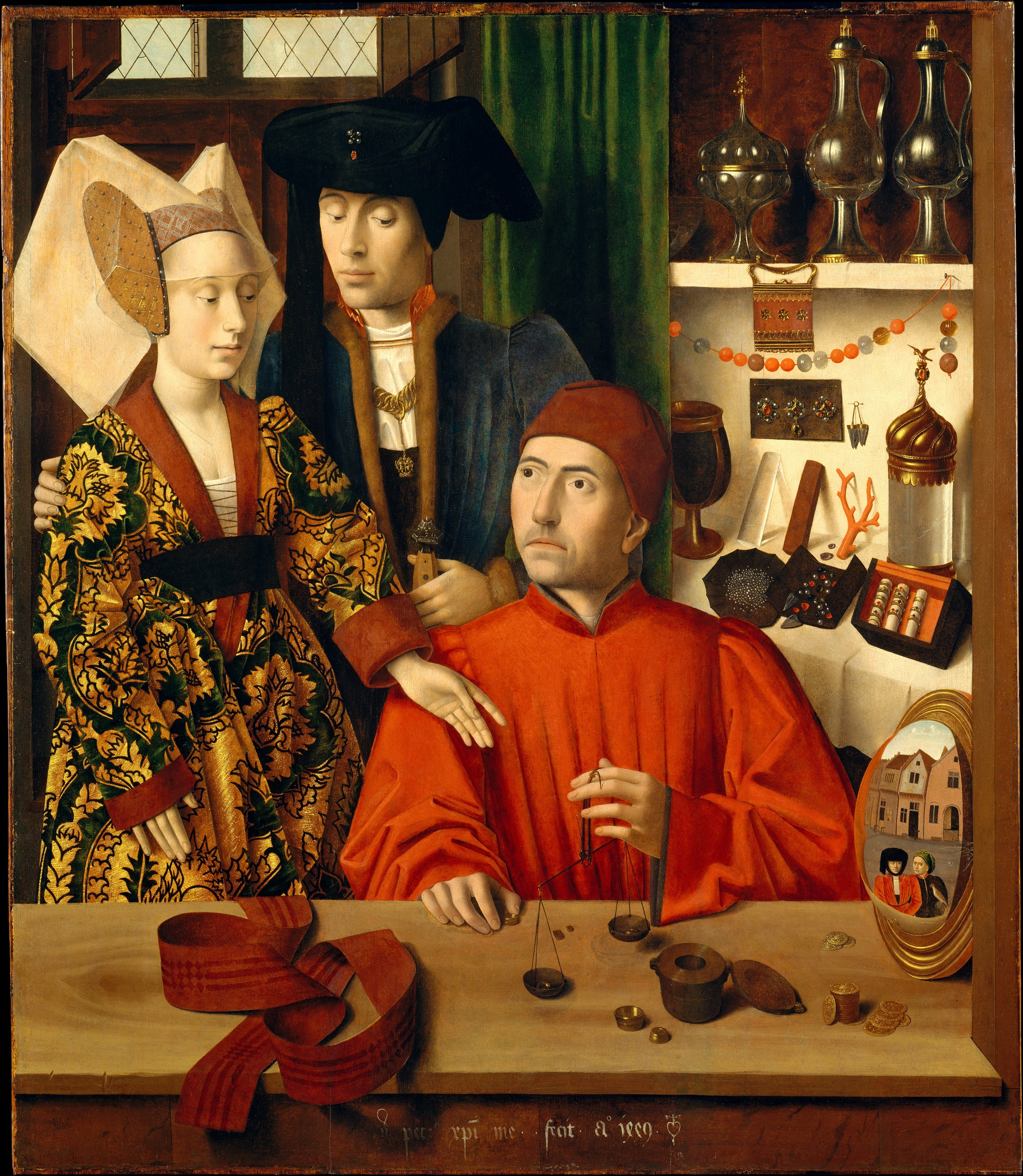
A Goldsmith in his Shop, by Petrus Christus, 1449, in Bruges; a coconut cup to the right of his head.

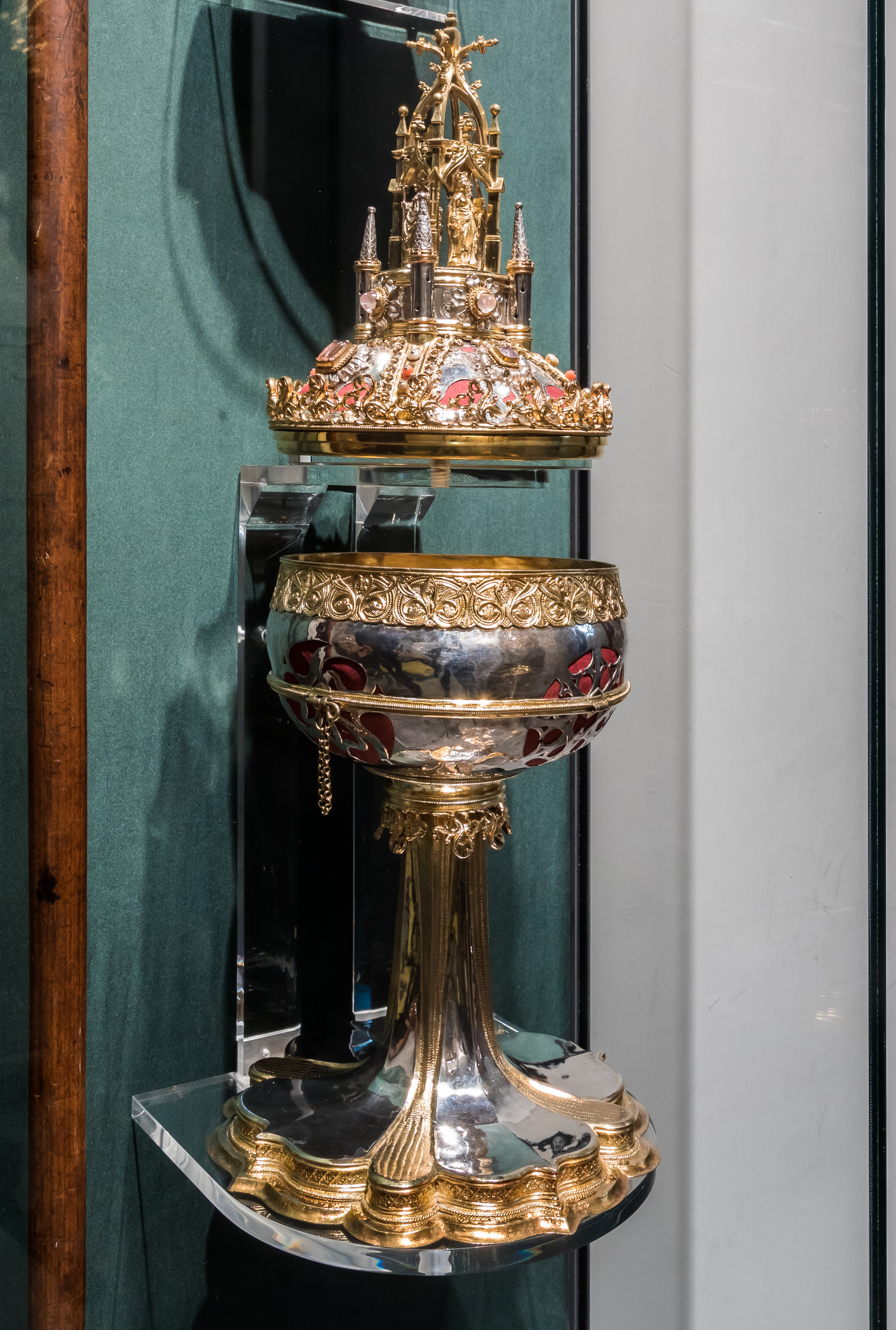
Reliquary-cup of St Heribert, Cologne, c. 1520

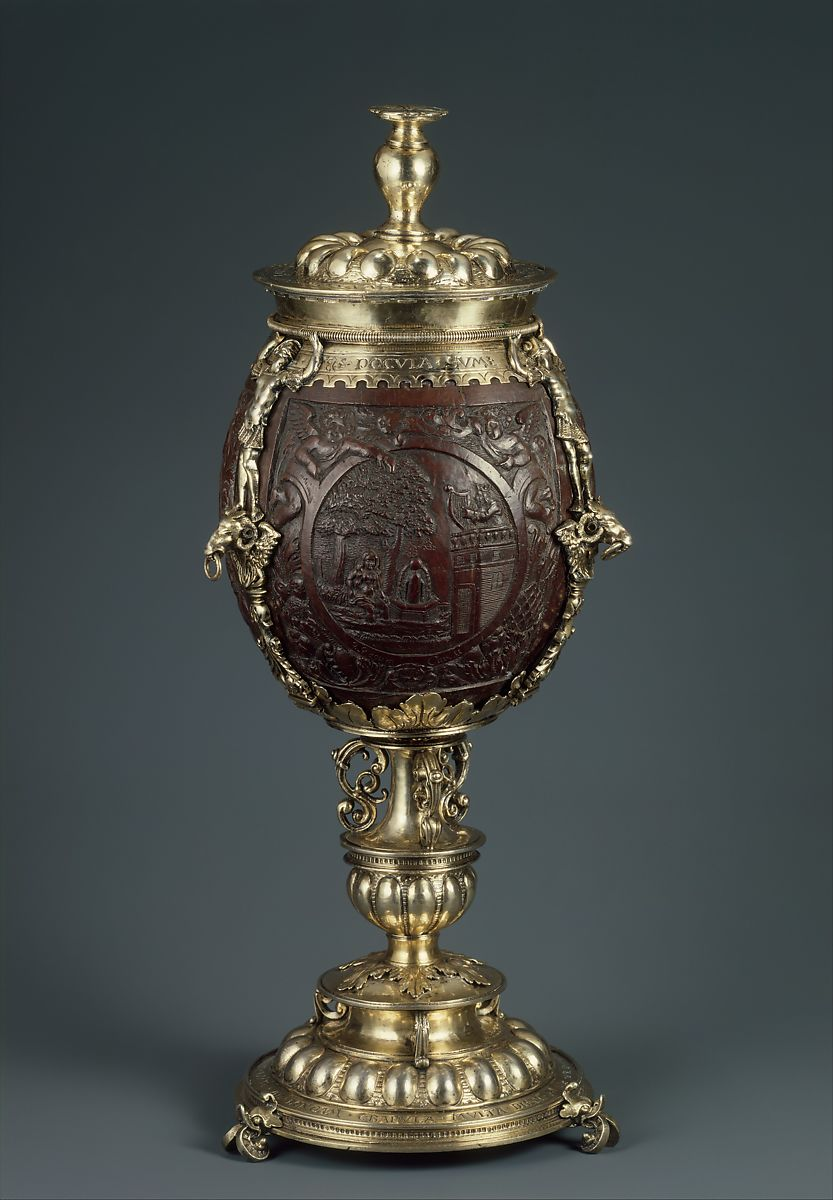
Silver-gilt, by Hans van Amsterdam, 1533, Metropolitan Museum of Art

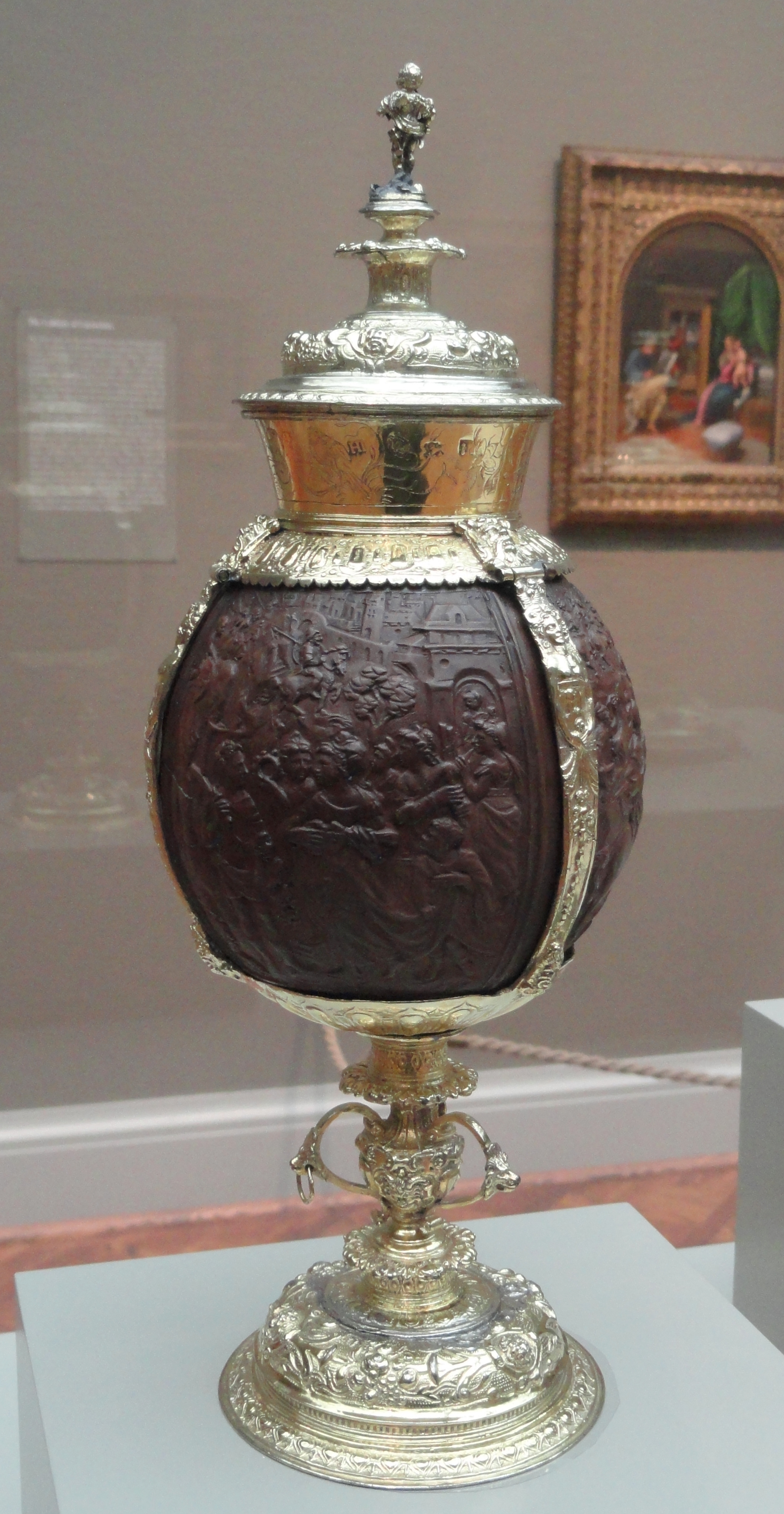
Coconut Cup with Scenes from the Life of David, 1577–1578, England or Netherlands, silver gilt, Art Institute of Chicago

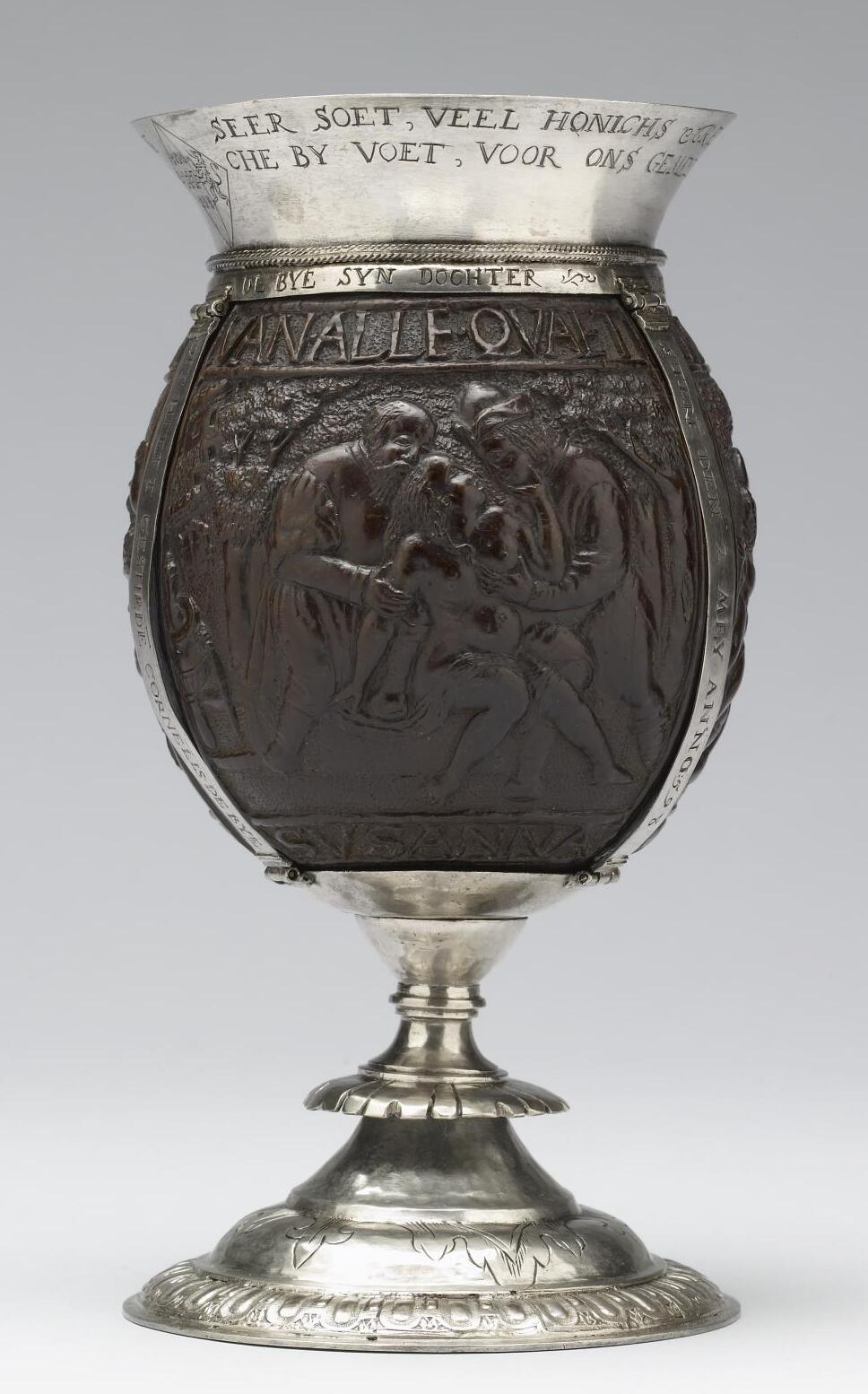
Cornelis de Bye, Coconut Cup with Old Testament Scenes, here Susannah and the Elders, before 1598.

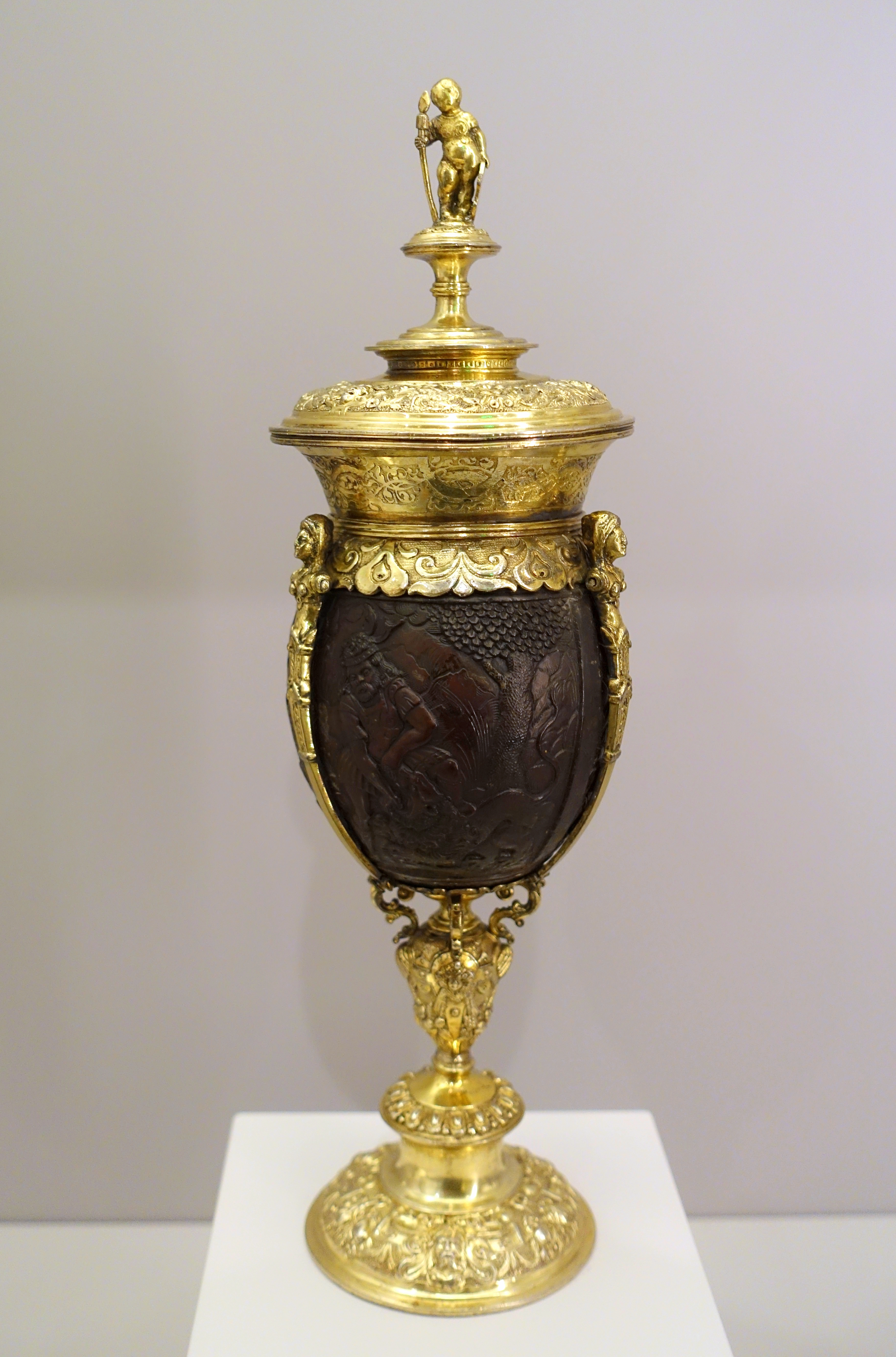
Cup with Scenes from the Story of Samson, Hans Peter Muller, Germany, c. 1600, silver-gilt, Busch-Reisinger Museum, Harvard

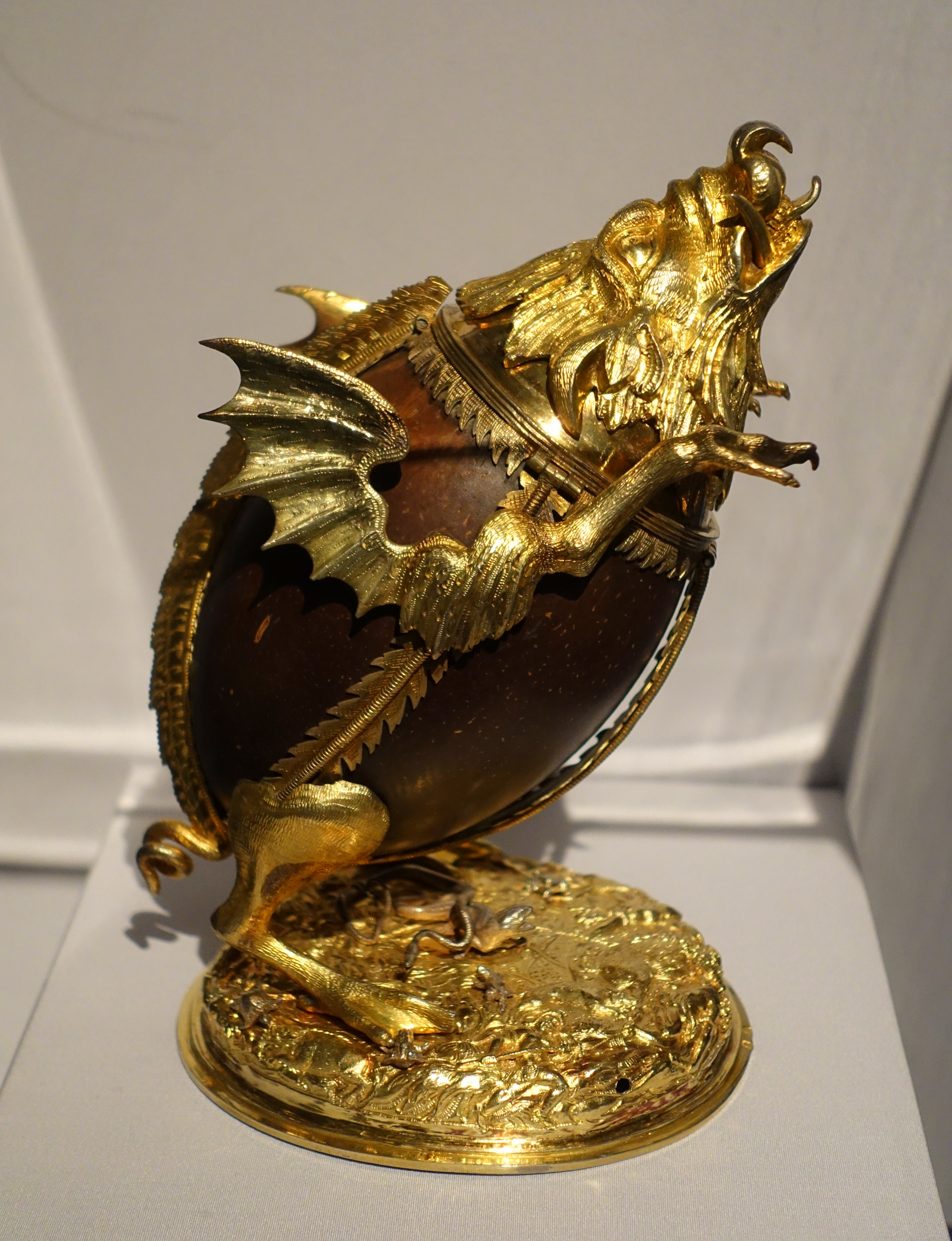
Grotesque wild boar cup, Caspar Beutmuller the Elder, Nuremberg, 1603–1609, silver-gilt and cold paint, Metropolitan Museum of Art, New York

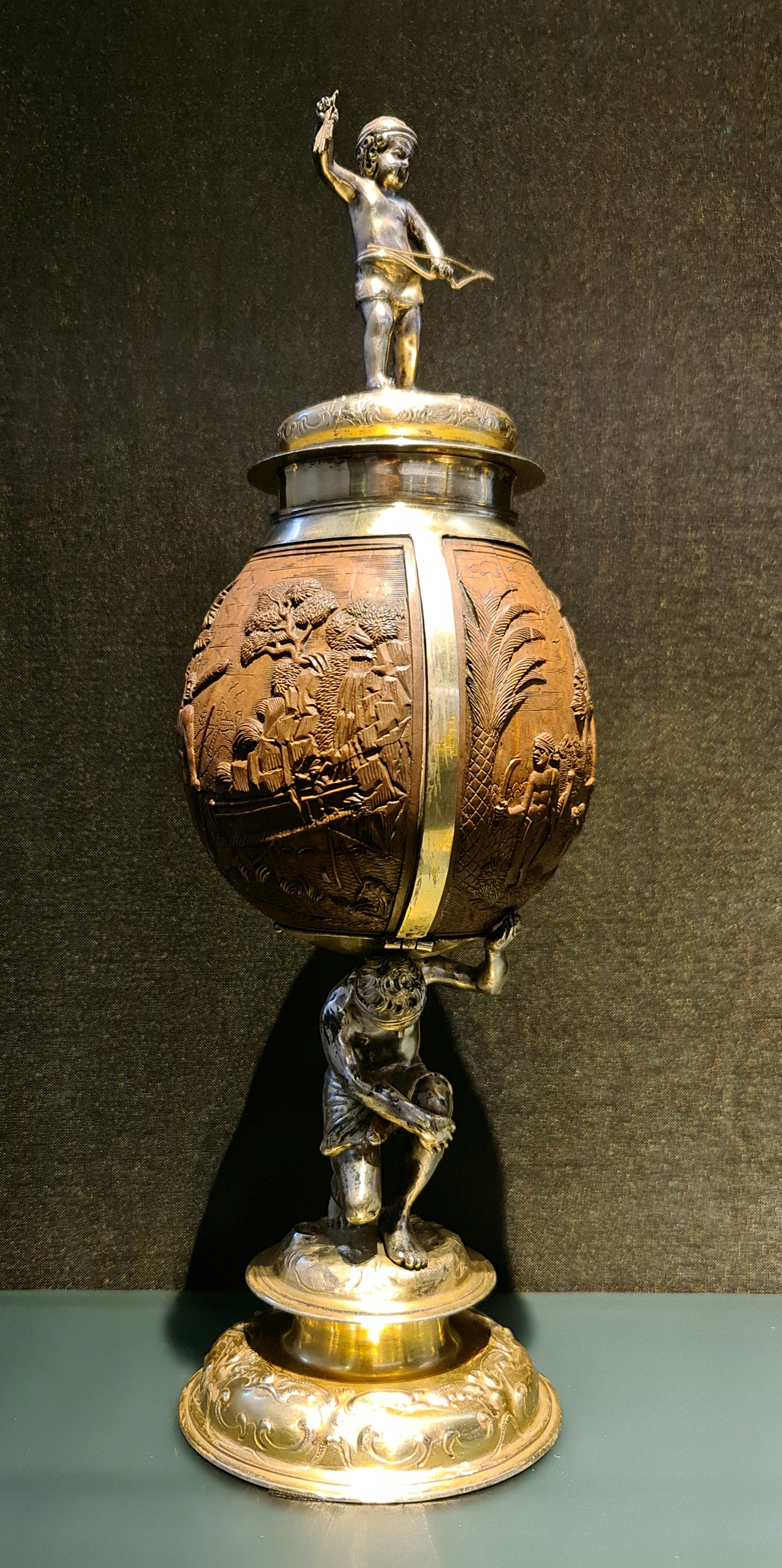
Cup carved with Brazilian scenes, c. 1656, Neues Grünes Gewölbe, Dresden

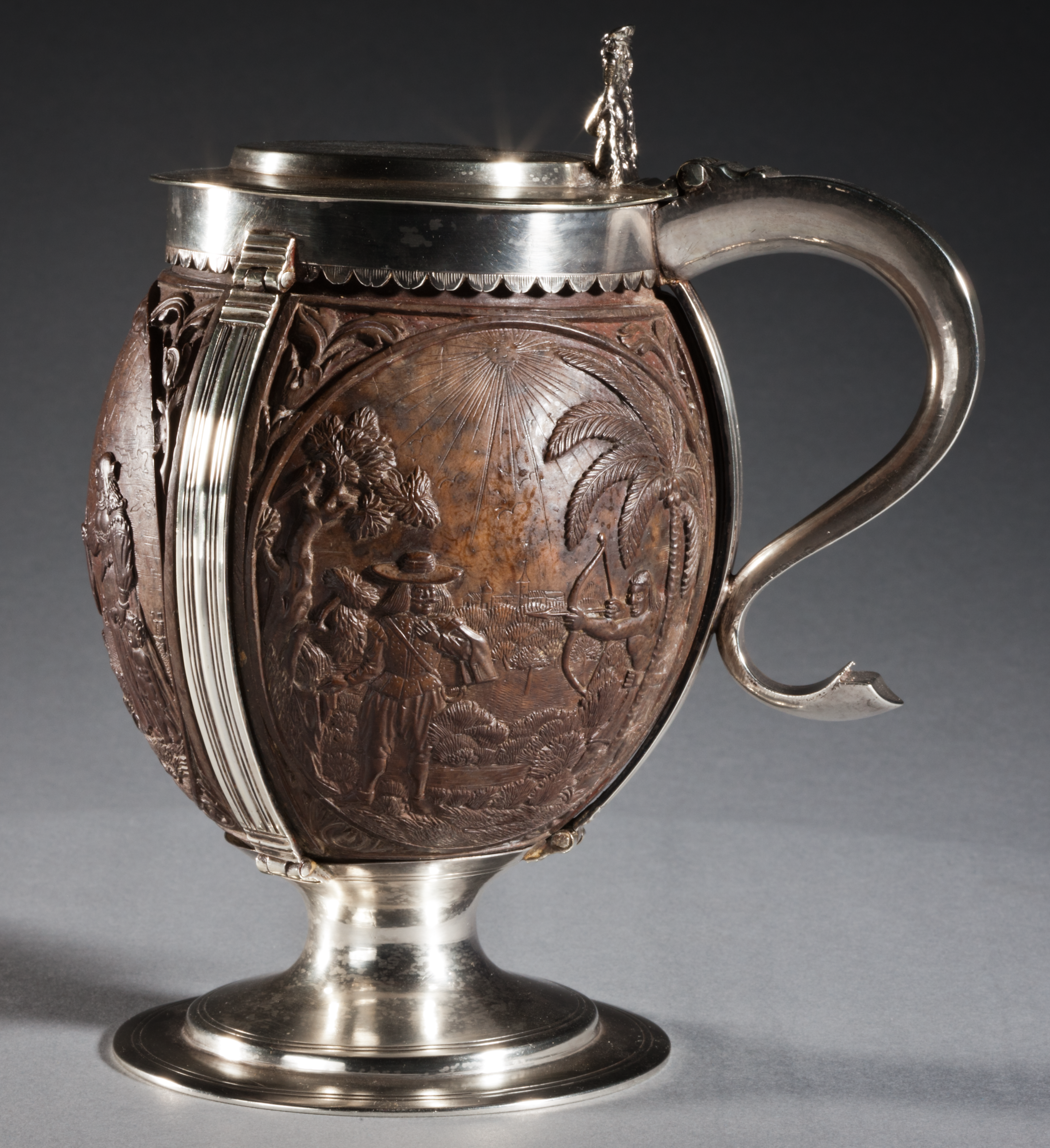
17th-century tankard with hinged lid, and 3 tropical scenes. Carving probably Dutch, the silver mounts probably English

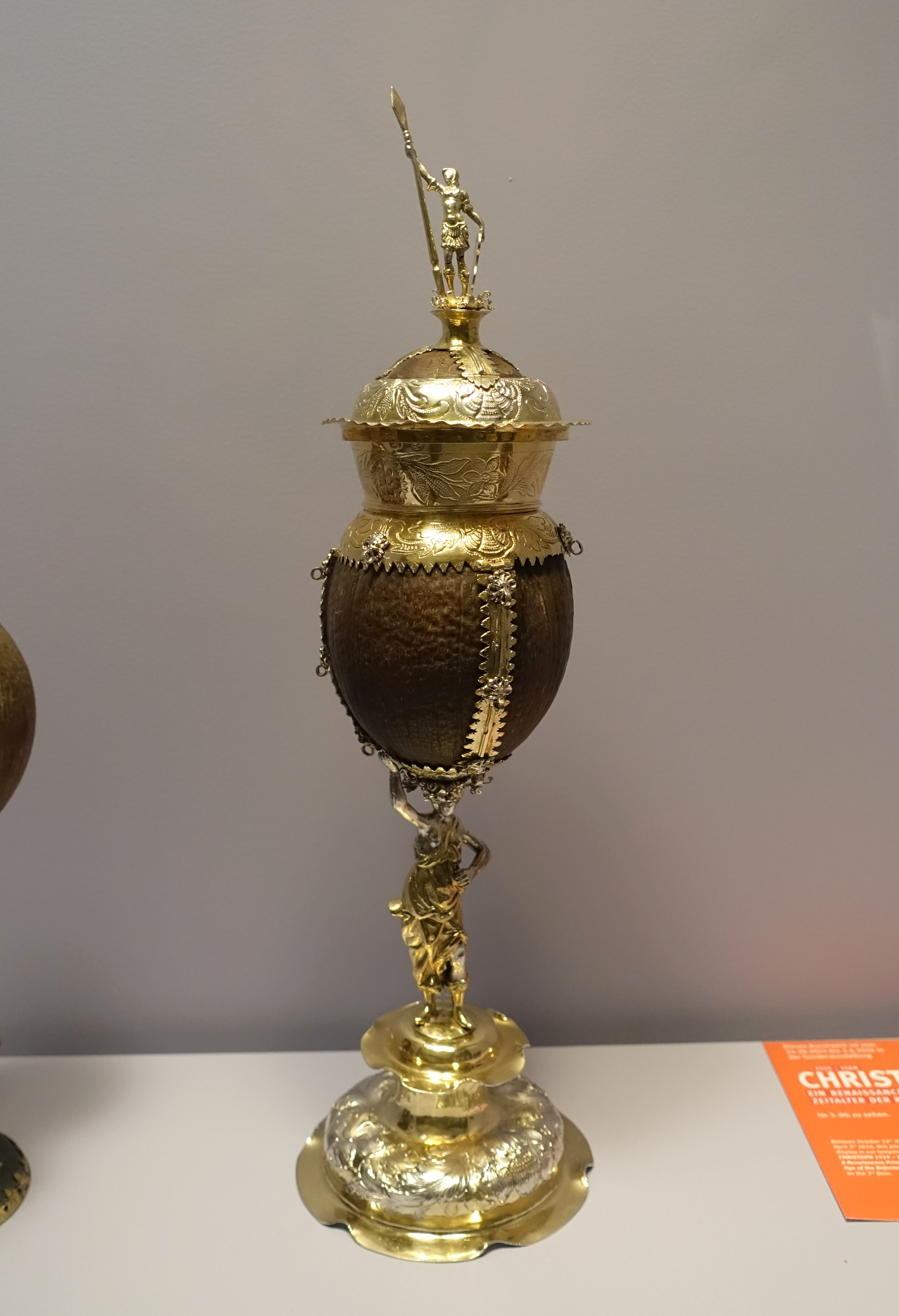
Heinrich Mannlich, Augsburg, 1688, coconut, silver-gilt, Landesmuseum Württemberg, Stuttgart

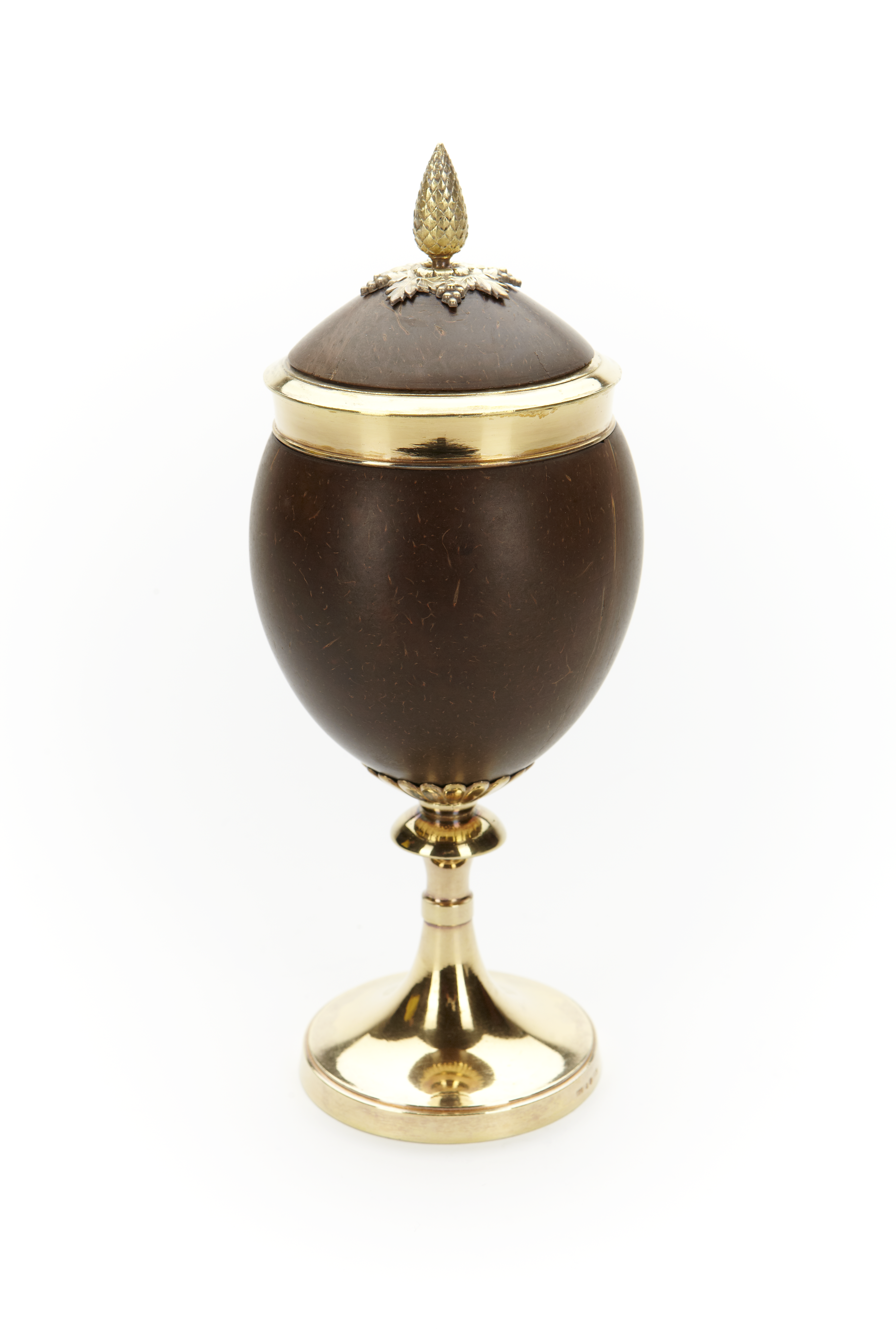
Neoclassical elegance, silver-gilt, Stockholm 1809

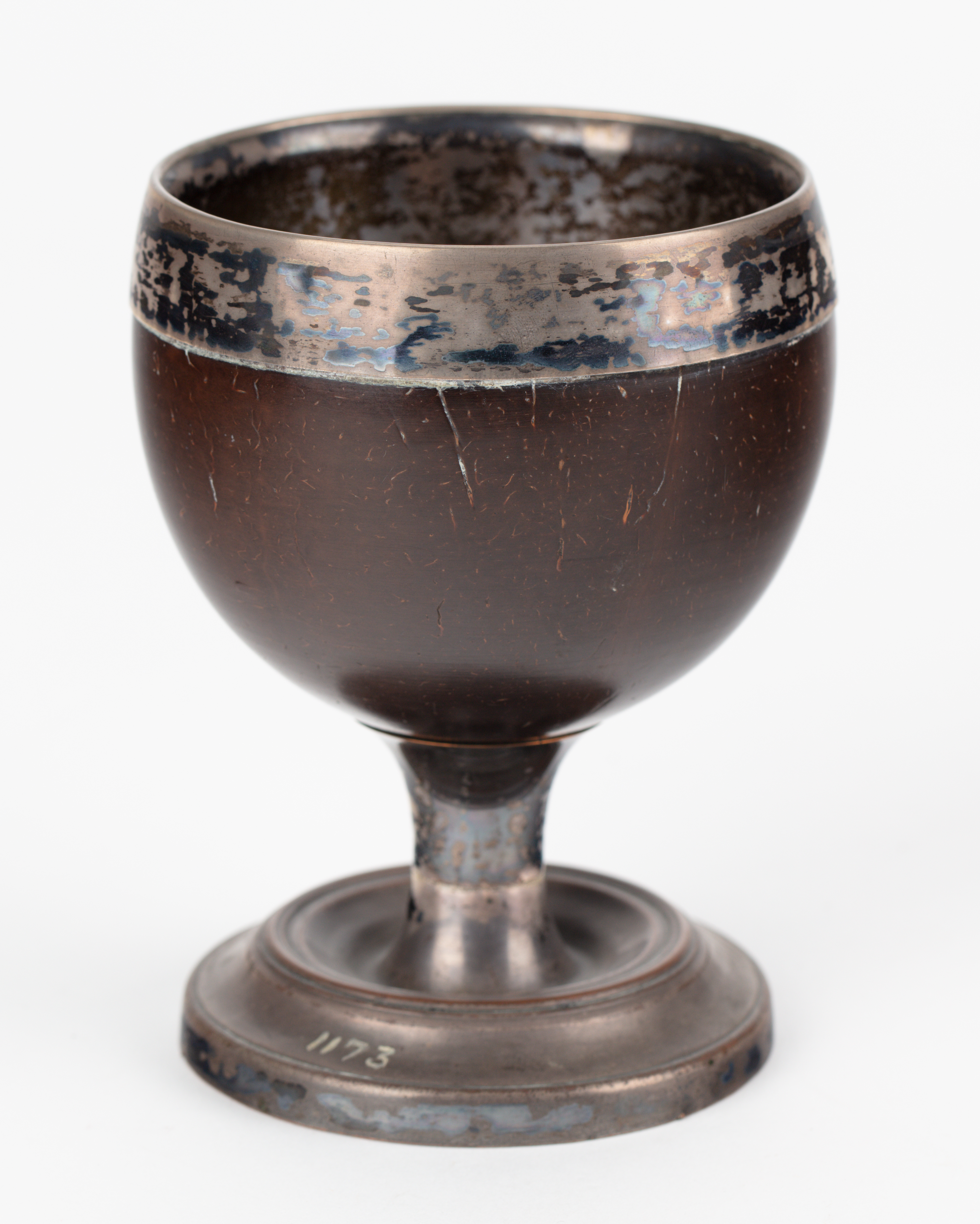
Cup with pewter mounts, New Zealand, c. 1849

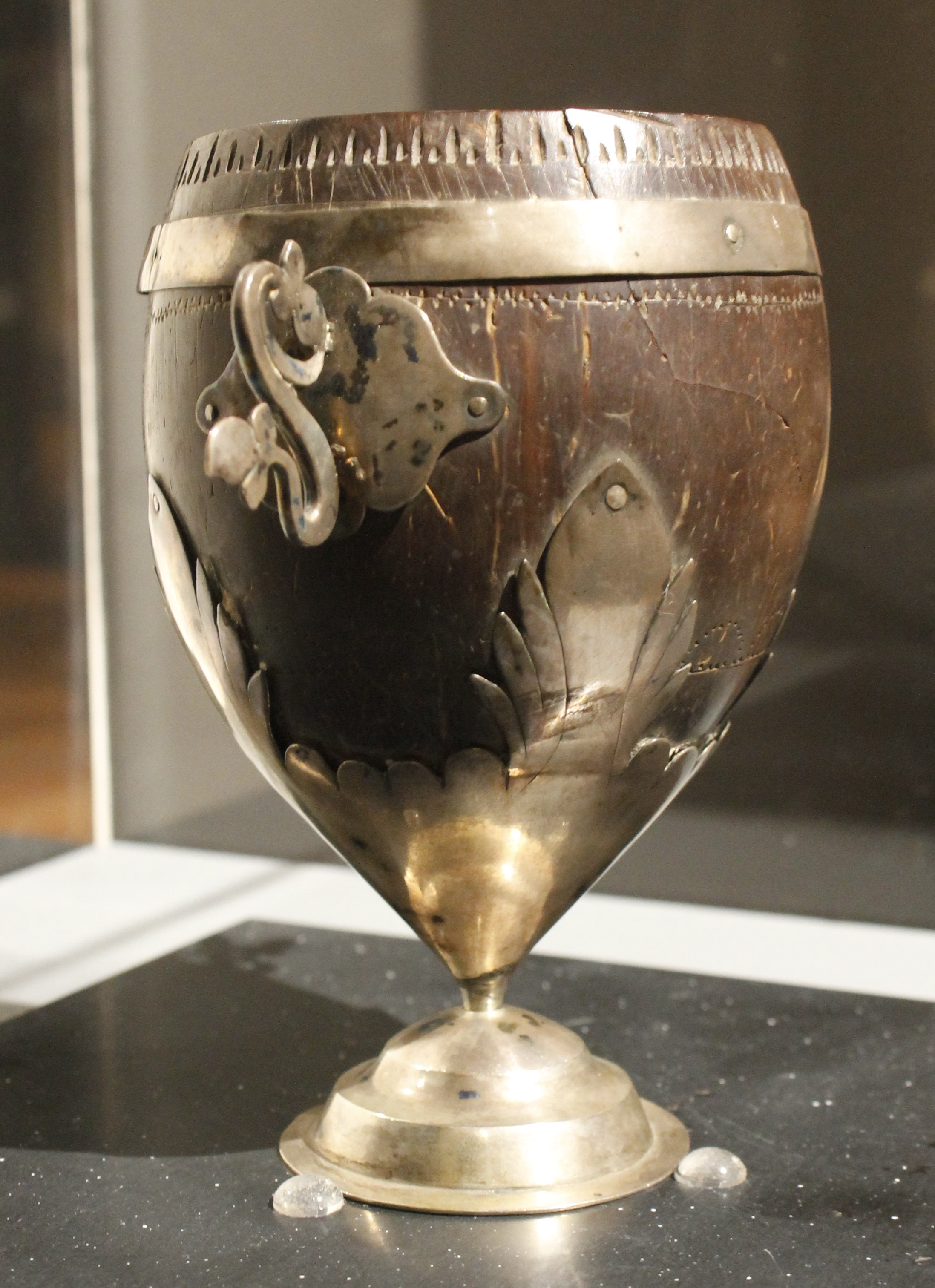
Coco chocolatero, probably Mexico, with brass? mounts

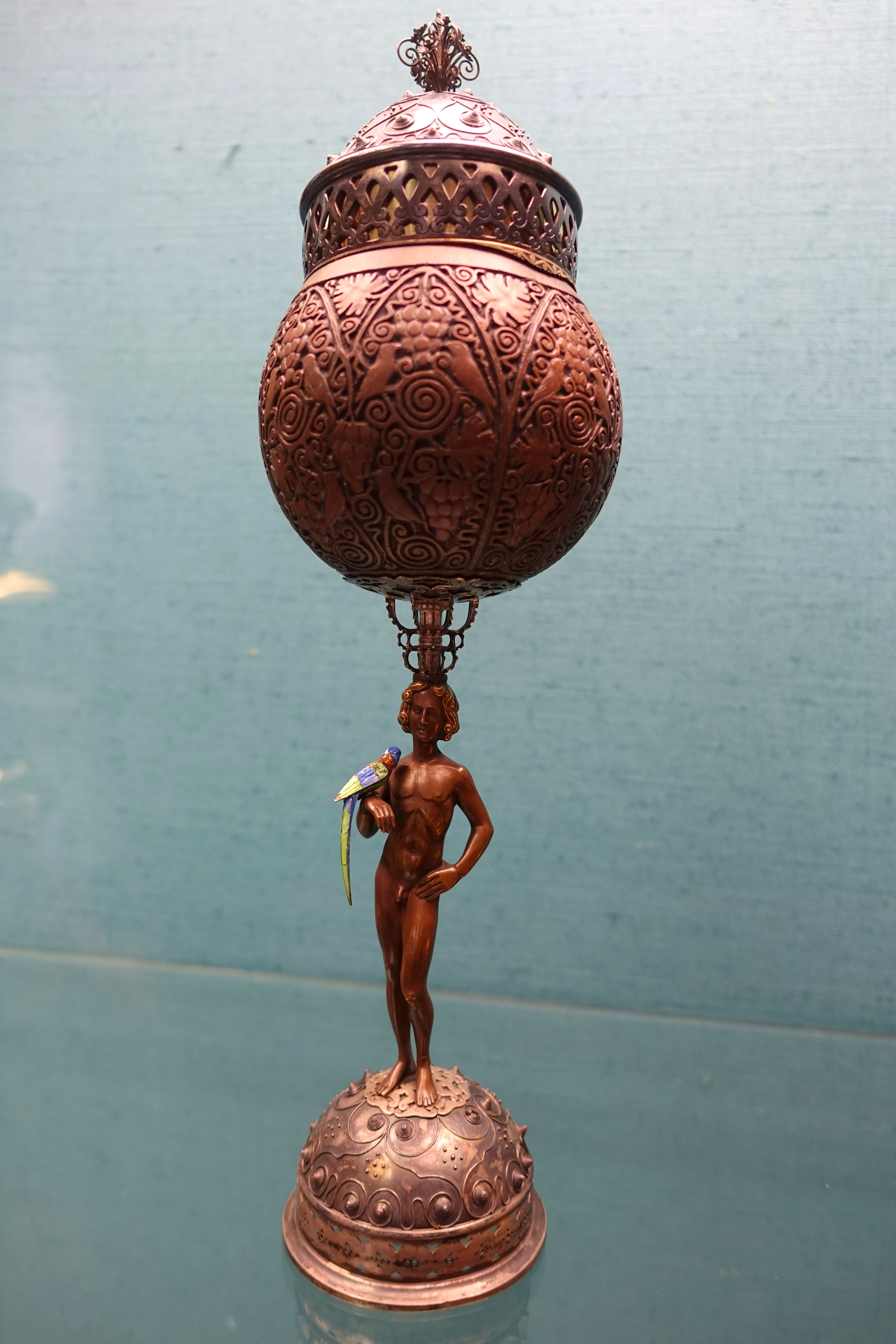
Ernst Riegel, Cologne, 1915, coconut, silver, enamel, Germanisches Nationalmuseum, Nuremberg

== See also ==
- Drinking horn
- Kashkul
