= Hugo van der Velden =

Dutch art historian

Hugo Tjeerd van der Velden (born 19 October 1963, in Boxmeer) is a Dutch art historian. He currently is Chair of Art History of the Middle Ages, especially in the Low Countries at the University of Amsterdam.

== Education and career ==
Hugo van der Velden studied art history at the Universiteit Utrecht, where he also taught from 1992 to 2003. During this time he was also a fellow at the Warburg Institute and a visiting lecturer at the Courtauld Institute. In 2003, he was appointed Professor in the History of Art and Architecture department at Harvard University. He currently teaches at the Universiteit van Amsterdam.

== Works ==
His first book, The Donor's Image: Gerard Loyet and the Votive Images of Charles the Bold, was published by Brepols in 2000.
