= Kozhukkatta =

Dumpling made from rice flour

Kozhukatta
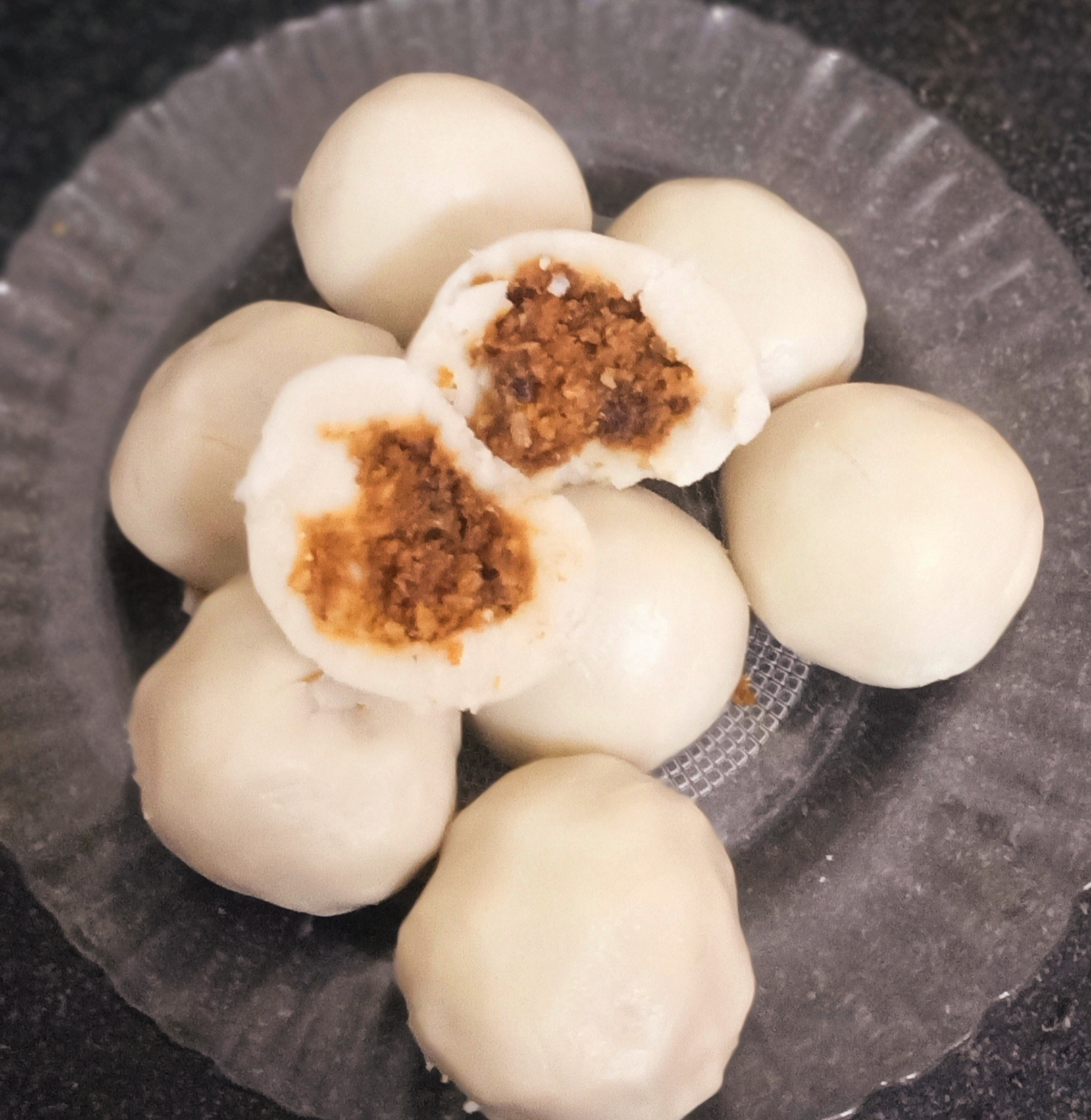
- Kozhukatta/kozhukkattai
- Course: Dessert
- Place of origin: Kerala and Tamil Nadu
- Region or state: Kerala and Tamil Nadu
- Associated cuisine: India, Sri Lanka
- Main ingredients: Grated coconut, jaggery
- Similar dishes: mont lone yay baw, klepon, bua loi, khanom kho, tangyuan, modak

Kozhukatta (Malayalam: കൊഴുക്കട്ട), Kozhukkattai (Tamil: கொழுகட்டை), kudumu (Telugu: కుడుము), Modaka (Kannada: ಮೋದಕ) is a popular South Indian dumpling made from rice flour, with a filling of grated coconut, jaggery, or chakkavaratti. Kozhukatta, although usually sweet, can sometimes be stuffed with a savory filling. Modak is a similar dish made in other parts of India.

== Preparation ==
The dish is prepared by mixing grated coconut with jaggery syrup, placing it inside dumplings of rice flour, and steaming the dumplings. Ghee, cardamom, finely ground roasted rice flour etc. may be added to enhance the taste and flavor of the filling. In Kerala, a variant of kozhukatta made with atta flour (instead of rice flour) and grated coconut is a staple breakfast among some groups.

== Culture ==
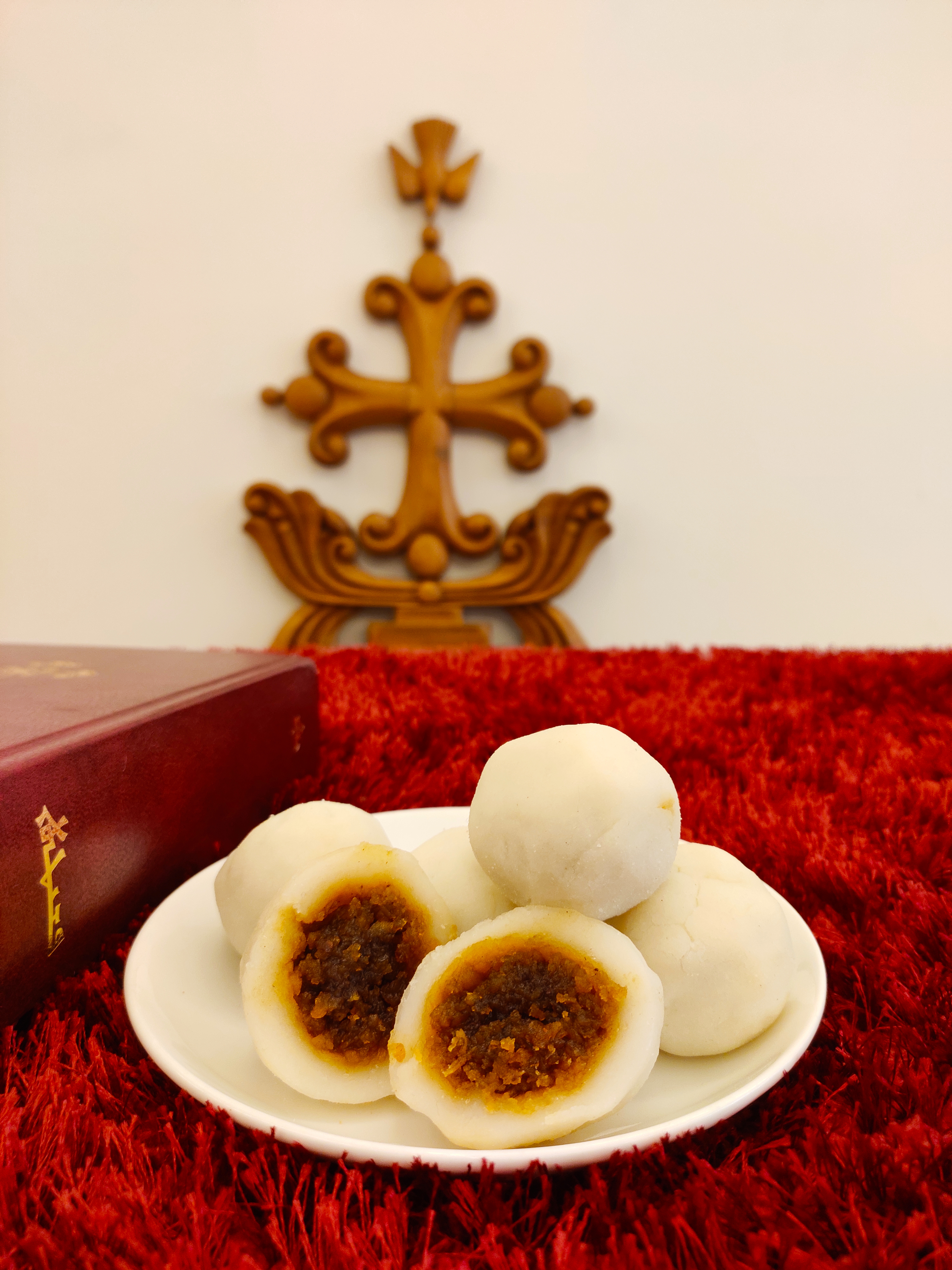
Kozhukkatta is prepared by Saint Thomas Christians on the Saturday prior to Palm Sunday and the day is hence called Kozhukatta Saturday.

In Tamil Nadu, the dish is traditionally associated with the Hindu God Ganesha and is prepared as an offering (naivedhya) on the occasion of Vinayaka Chathurthi. In Kerala, it is popularly associated with Oshana Sunday celebrations of Saint Thomas Christians and among other Christians. It is also eaten as an evening snack with tea or coffee.

Kozhukkatta is an important part of several natal customs of the Sri Lankan Tamil community. In Northern and Eastern Sri Lanka, there is a custom involving dumplings whose edges are pressed to resemble teeth being dropped gently on a baby's head while the family wishes for the infant to develop healthy teeth. In eastern areas of Sri Lanka, a smaller version called piḷḷai kozhukkaṭṭai is prepared by female family members for an expectant mother about four months after conception. These sweets are commonly exchanged at weddings as auspicious symbols of "plump" health and fertility.

== Making ==
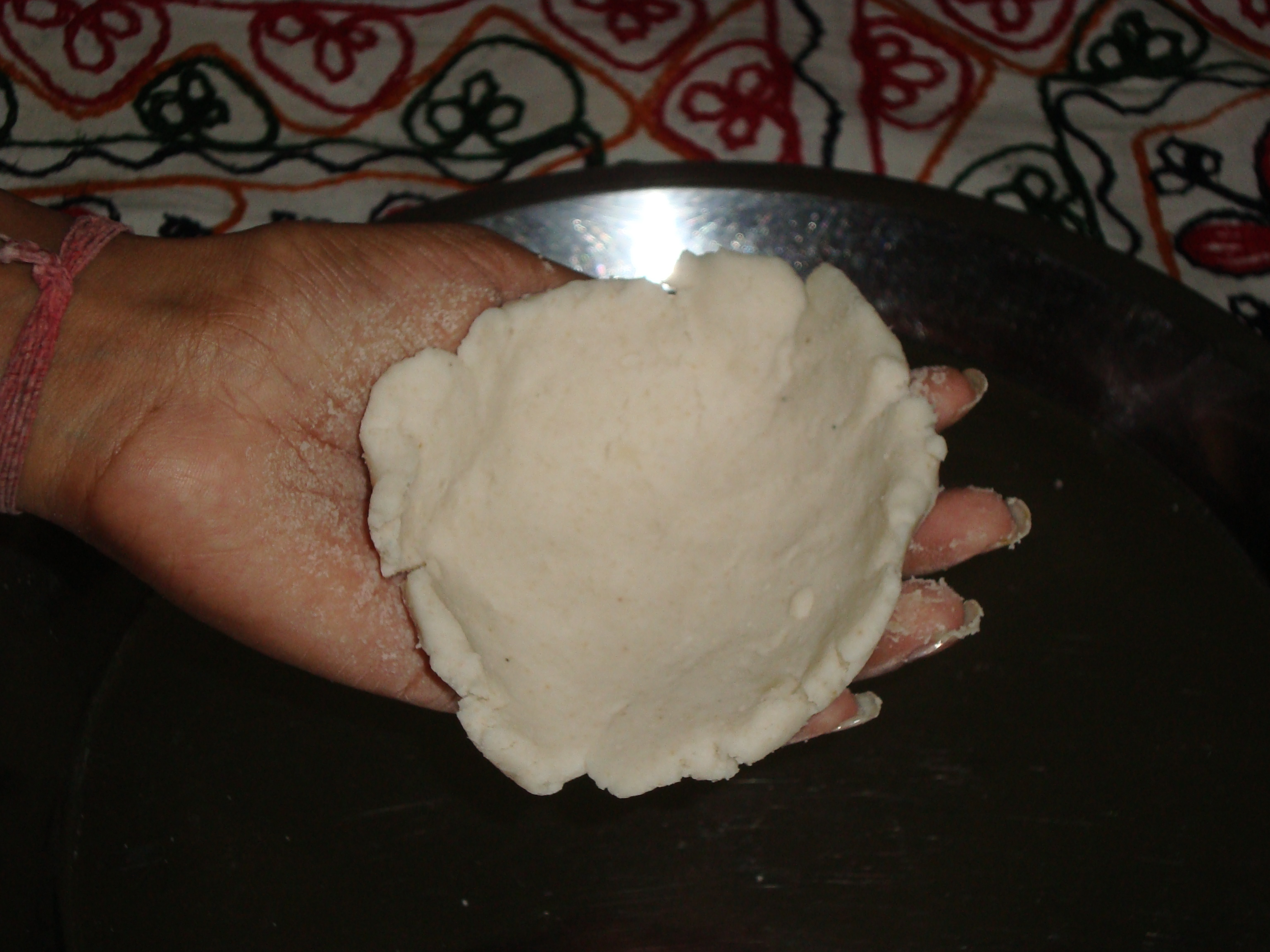
Flatten the rice dough

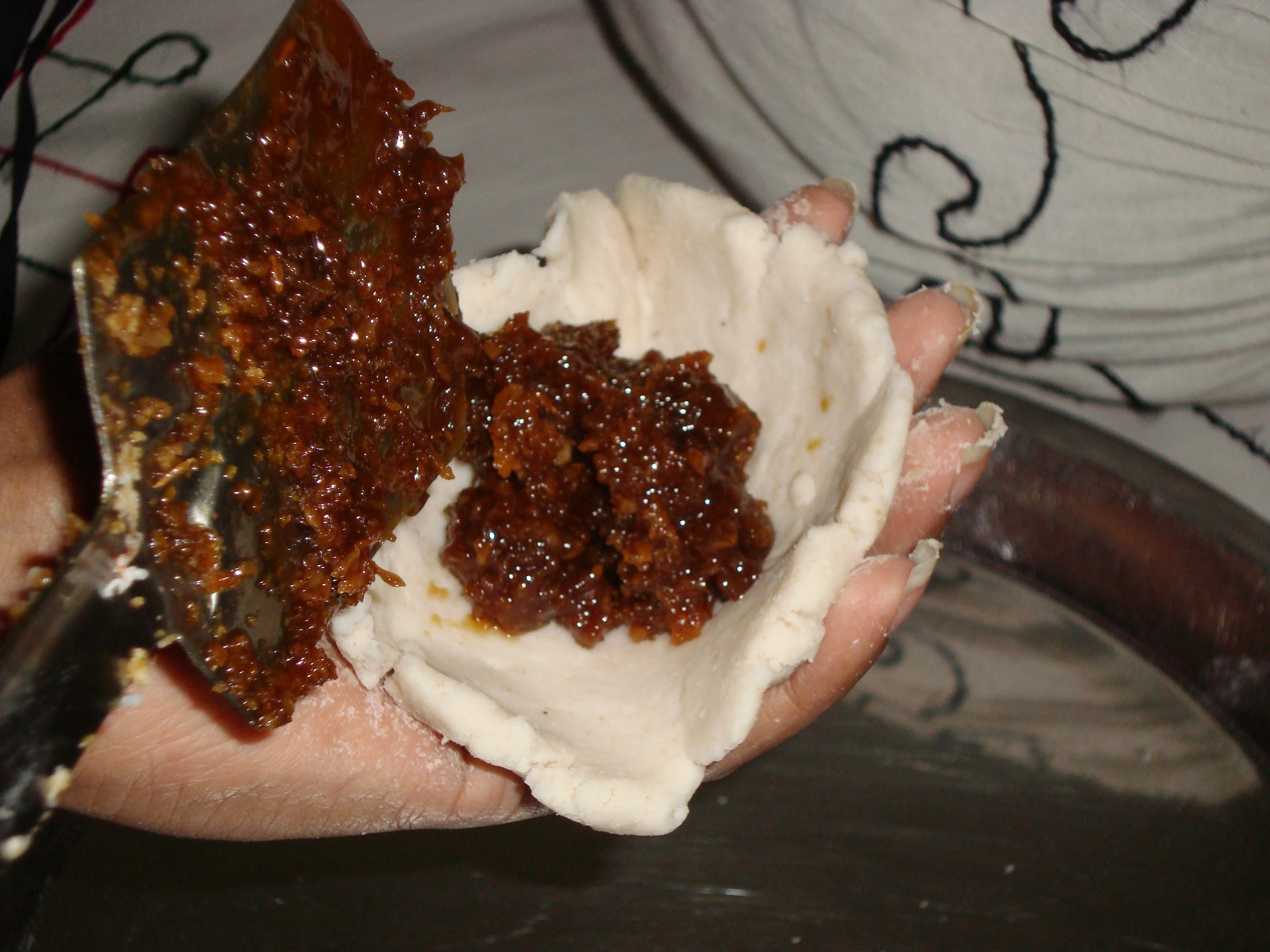
Fill with the mixture of jaggery and coconut

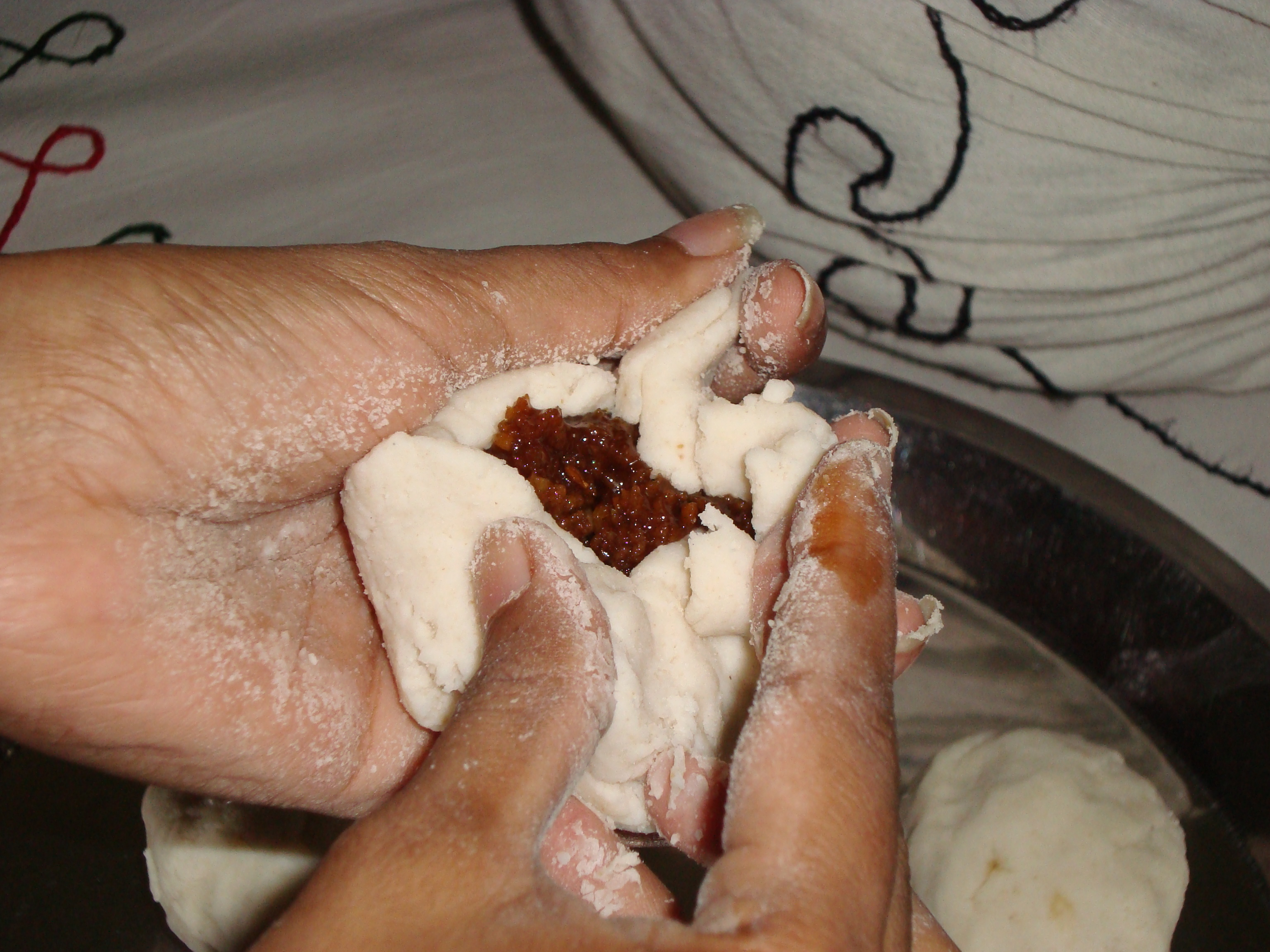
Close the dough

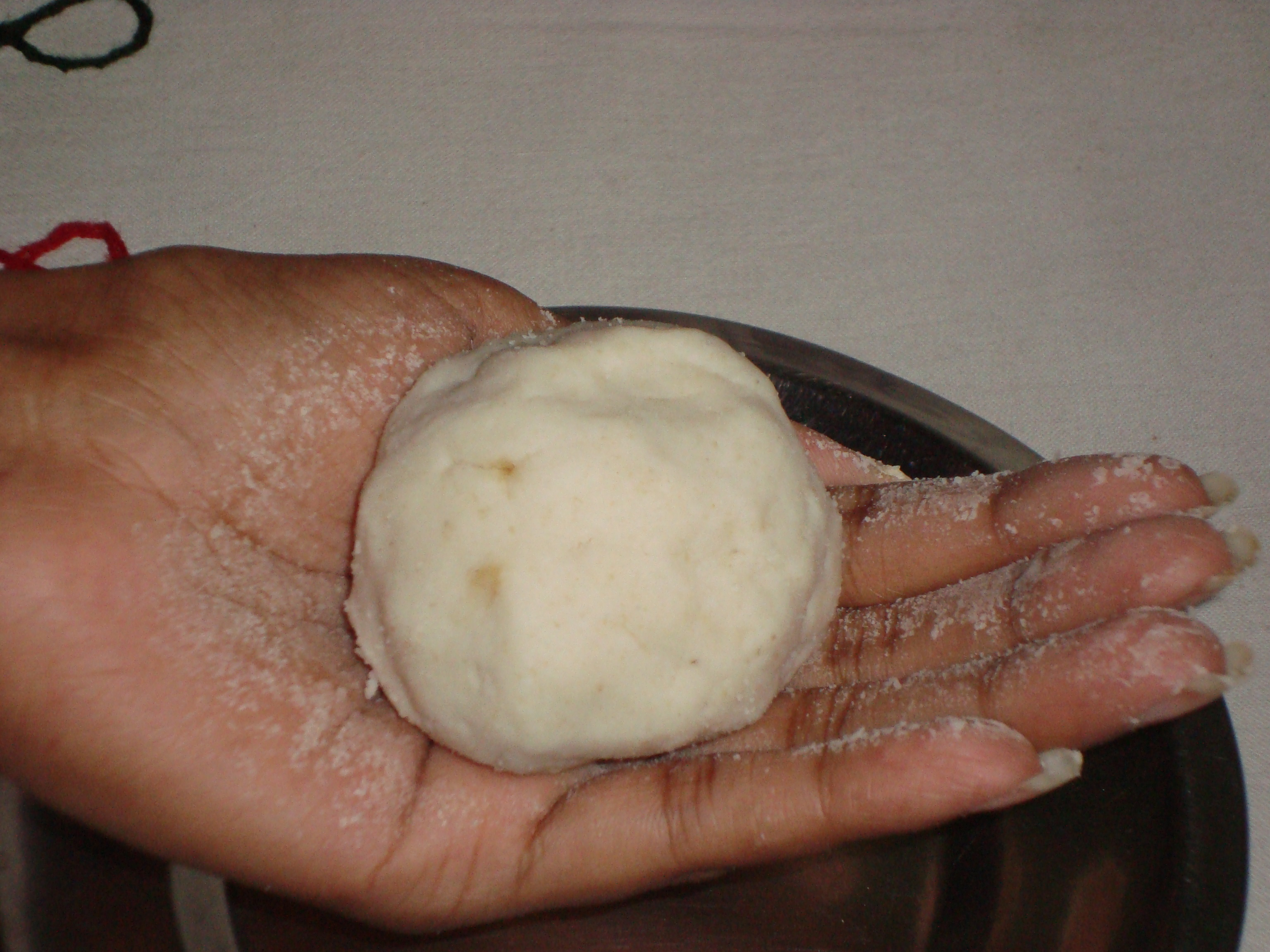
Mold it into the shape of a ball

== See also ==
- List of Indian sweets and desserts
- Thennai Kozhakkattai
- Manda pitha
- Momo (dumpling)
- List of dumplings
