= Kue kochi =

Malaysian & Indonesian traditional dessert

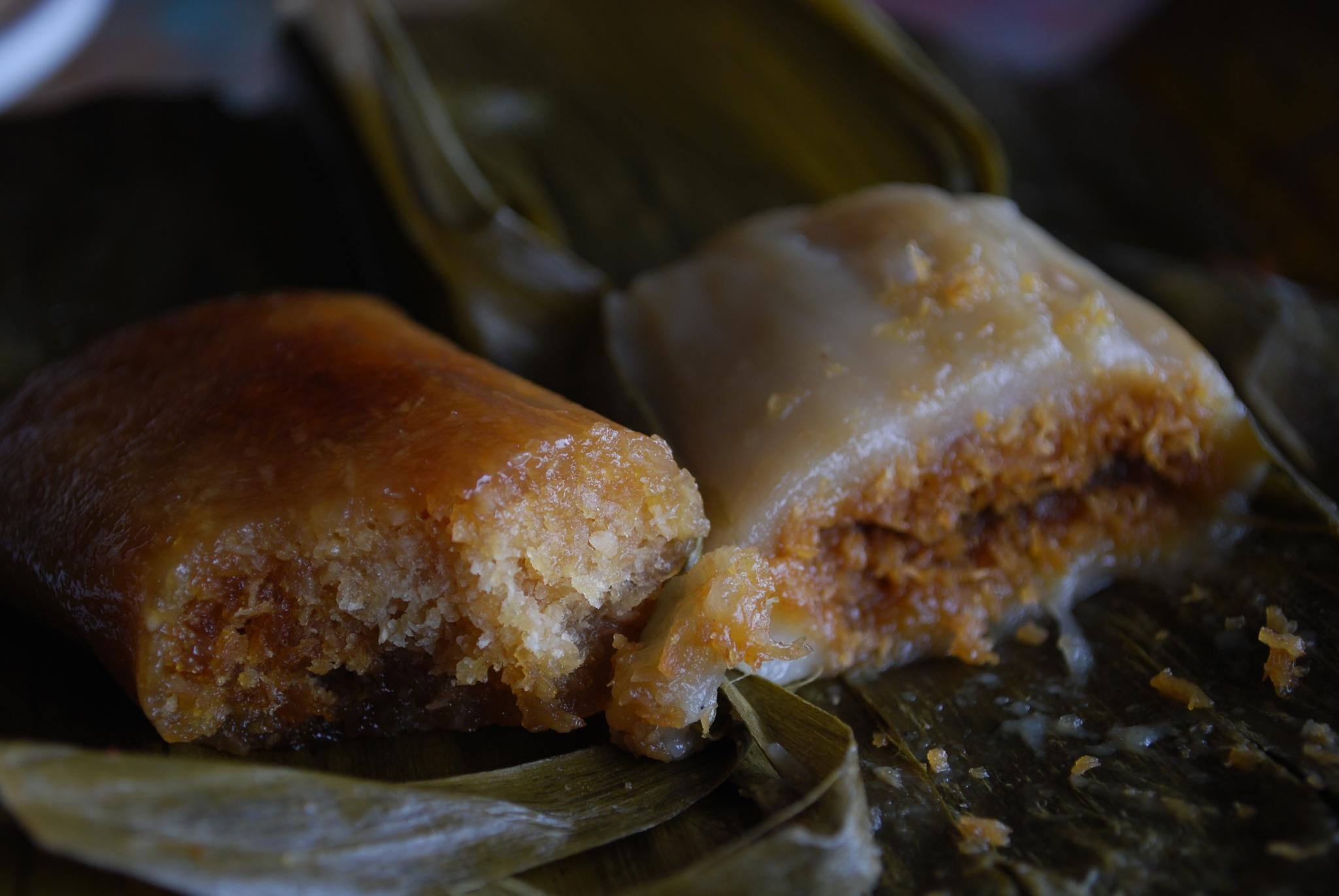
- Kue kochi in Singapore
- Alternative names: Koci
- Type: Dumpling, kue, kuih
- Course: Dessert or snack
- Place of origin: Southeast Asia
- Associated cuisine: Indonesia, Malaysia, Singapore, Brunei
- Created by: Javanese and Malay
- Main ingredients: Glutinous rice flour, shaved coconut, palm sugar
- Similar dishes: Mont phet htok, Bánh phu thê, modak

Kue kochi or koci (also known as passover cake in English) is a Maritime Southeast Asian dumpling-type kuih found in Javanese, Malay and Peranakan cuisine, typically made from black glutinous rice flour, and stuffed with coconut fillings with palm sugar.

In Brunei, Indonesia, Malaysia and Singapore, this snack is often as a dessert and can be eaten at anytime (during breakfast or tea time). Due to its use in ancestral offerings, it has been suggested that the black colour of the unpolished rice symbolises death, while the sweet filling represents resurrection.

== See also ==
- Peranakan cuisine
- Mochi - similar dessert in Japan made from glutinous rice flour.
