= List of storms named Bualoi =

The name Bualoi (Thai: บัวลอย, pronounced [būa.lɔ̄ːj]) has been used for two tropical cyclones in the western North Pacific Ocean. The name was contributed by Thailand and refers to a Thai dessert made of chewy glutinous rice balls in coconut milk soup. It replaced the name Rammasun, after it was retired following the 2014 Pacific typhoon season.

- Typhoon Bualoi (2019) (T1921, 22W) – a Category 5 typhoon that brought floods over Japan.
- Typhoon Bualoi (2025) (T2520, 26W, Opong) – a deadly storm that carved a path of destruction over the Philippines and Vietnam.

The name Bualoi was retired following the 2025 Pacific typhoon season and a replacement name will be given at the 59th WMO/Typhoon Committee Annual Session in spring 2027.
