= Kottarakkulam Sree Mahaganapathy Kovil =

Kottarakkulam Sree Mahaganapathy Temple
- Kottarakkulam Sree Mahaganapathy Temple, Kollam, Kerala

Religion
- Affiliation: Hinduism
- District: Kollam
- Deity: Mahaganapathy
- Festival: Ganesh Chaturthi

Location
- Location: Kollam
- State: Kerala
- Country: India
- Coordinates: 8°53′27.4″N 76°34′30.1″E

Architecture
- Type: Architecture of Kerala

Specifications
- Temple: One
- Elevation: 33.01 m (108 ft)

Kottarakkulam Sree Mahaganapathy Temple, Kollam is a popular temple in Kollam, Kerala, South India.

== Location ==
This temple is located with the geographic coordinates of 8°53′27.4″N 76°34′30.1″E at an altitude of about 33.01 m above the mean sea level.

The temple is situated in the centre part of the Kollam corporation, near the Kollam Civil Station. The main deity enshrined here is Lord Ganesh, apart from Nagaraja and Swami Aiyappan. The main priest-hold of this temple is run by Tamil Brahmin community of Kollam Corporation, consisting of 270 families. The Prasadams here are mainly Appams and Modakams. The annual Vinayaka Chathurthi festival of the Kottarakulam Maha ganapathy here begins in August. Rituals including Ashta Dravya Mahaganapathy Homam, Kalashapooja, laksharchana and pushpabhishekam form a major attraction here.

== History ==
The temple over the years has attracted a number of devotees from far-off places, especially in recent years. The temple, although a modern one in appearance, is actually an ancient temple, which was reconstructed and developed much to its present form in the year 1984.

The March issue of the Malayalam monthly magazine Jyotisharatnam carried an article on this temple. One of the former priests, Late Shri. Ramayya Vadhyar, who served as the chief priest of for a very long time, found special mention in that issue. Some of the other notable priests who have served the shrine include late Shri Sankara Narayana Vadhyar, Brahmashri Narayana Sastrigal (a.k.a. Rajamani Vadhyar), Shri, Kannan Vadhyar etc.

The priests who serve at present are Shri Sankara Vadhyar and Shri. Venkatarama Vadhyar and Chandru Vadhyar. The Almighty Lord supports a lot of people and families who are related with the temple. Shri. Venkatarama Vadhyar now serves as the chief priest. Sri Sankara Subramonian is the secretary.

== Daily Pooja Timings ==
Poojas	Timings (IST)
Nirmalya Darshanam	05:00
Ganapathy Homam	05:30
Usha pooja / Deeparadhana	07:00
Chirappu / Navagrahahoma pooja start	08:00
Chirappu / Navagrahahoma Deeparadhana	10:00
Nada closing	10:30
Nada opening	16:30
Deeparadhana	19:00
Chirappu pooja / Deeparadhana	19:30
Nada closing	20:00

== See also ==
- Temples of Kerala
