= Cenil =

Indonesian snack

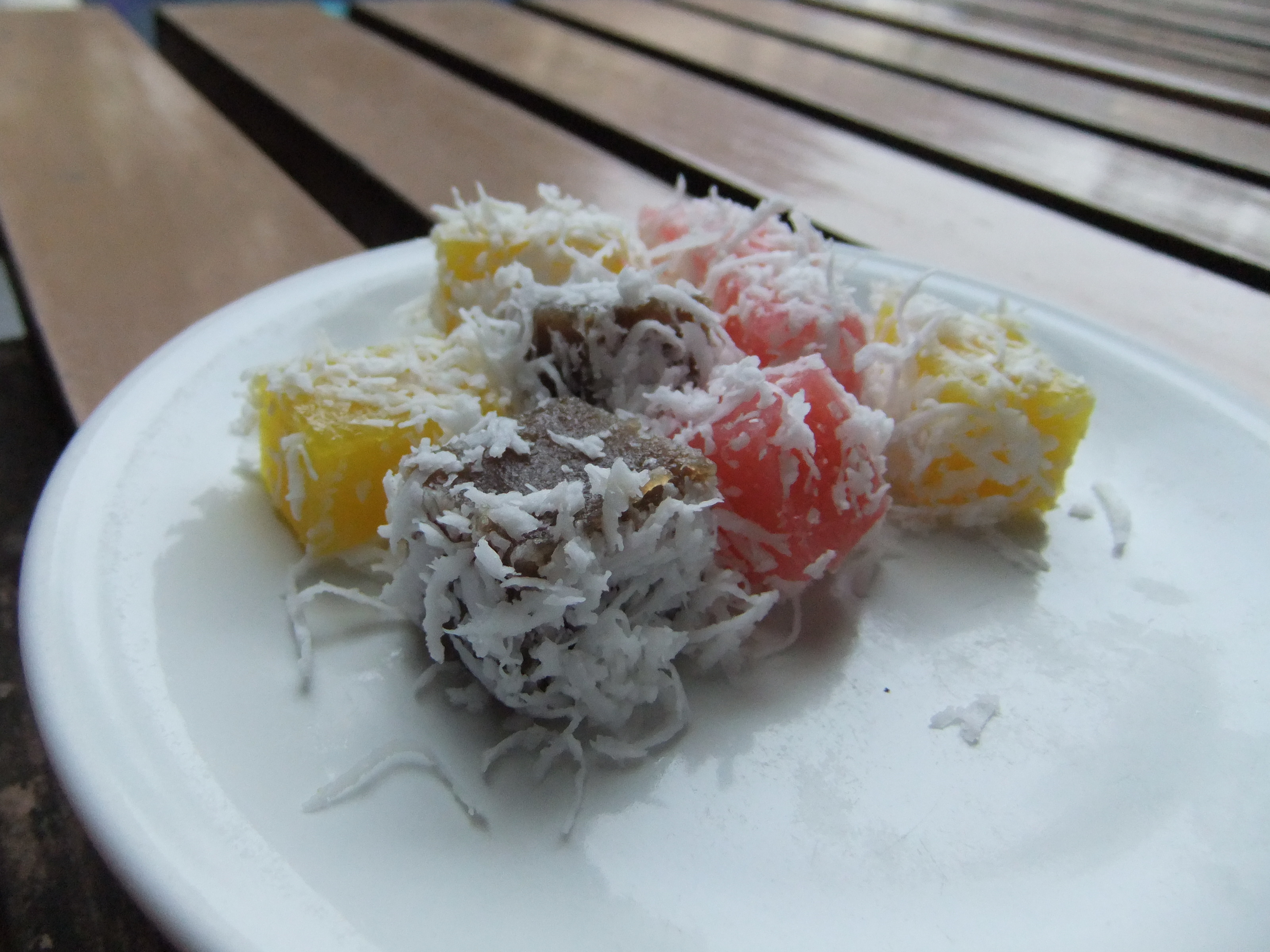
- Cenil, a Javanese traditional snack
- Alternative names: Cetil (Central Java & Yogyakarta)
- Place of origin: Indonesia
- Region or state: Java, and spread across Indonesia
- Created by: Javanese
- Main ingredients: Tapioca flour, sugar, grated coconut
- Similar dishes: khanom kho, mont lone yay baw, klepon, modak

Cenil, sometimes also called as cendil or cetil is a traditional snack made from tapioca dough and sugar, usually added with food colouring, and shaped into small balls or cubes, coated and consumed with grated coconut.

Cenil is a traditional Javanese snack usually associated with Pacitan, East Java. This snack can be found being sold in traditional market in Central Java and Yogyakarta, where it is called cetil. Usually sold together with other Javanese traditional snacks such as klepon, kicak, getuk, ciwel, cantel, pertolo and tepo. In 1990s, cenil usually only can be found in traditional marketplaces which only operated in Javanese pasaran days.

== Etymology ==
The term cenil (from Javanese: ꦕꦼꦤꦶꦭ꧀, romanized: Cênil) denotes something cute, small and coquettish, due to its small size and colourful appearance, which usually coloured green, yellow, red, pink and brown using food colouring.

== History ==
Earliest record of cenil or cetil was mentioned in a Javanese manuscript Serat Centhini dated from 1814. However, expert suggested a snack similar with, or a predecessor of cenil has been existed since Mataram era circa the 8th century.

== Ingredients ==
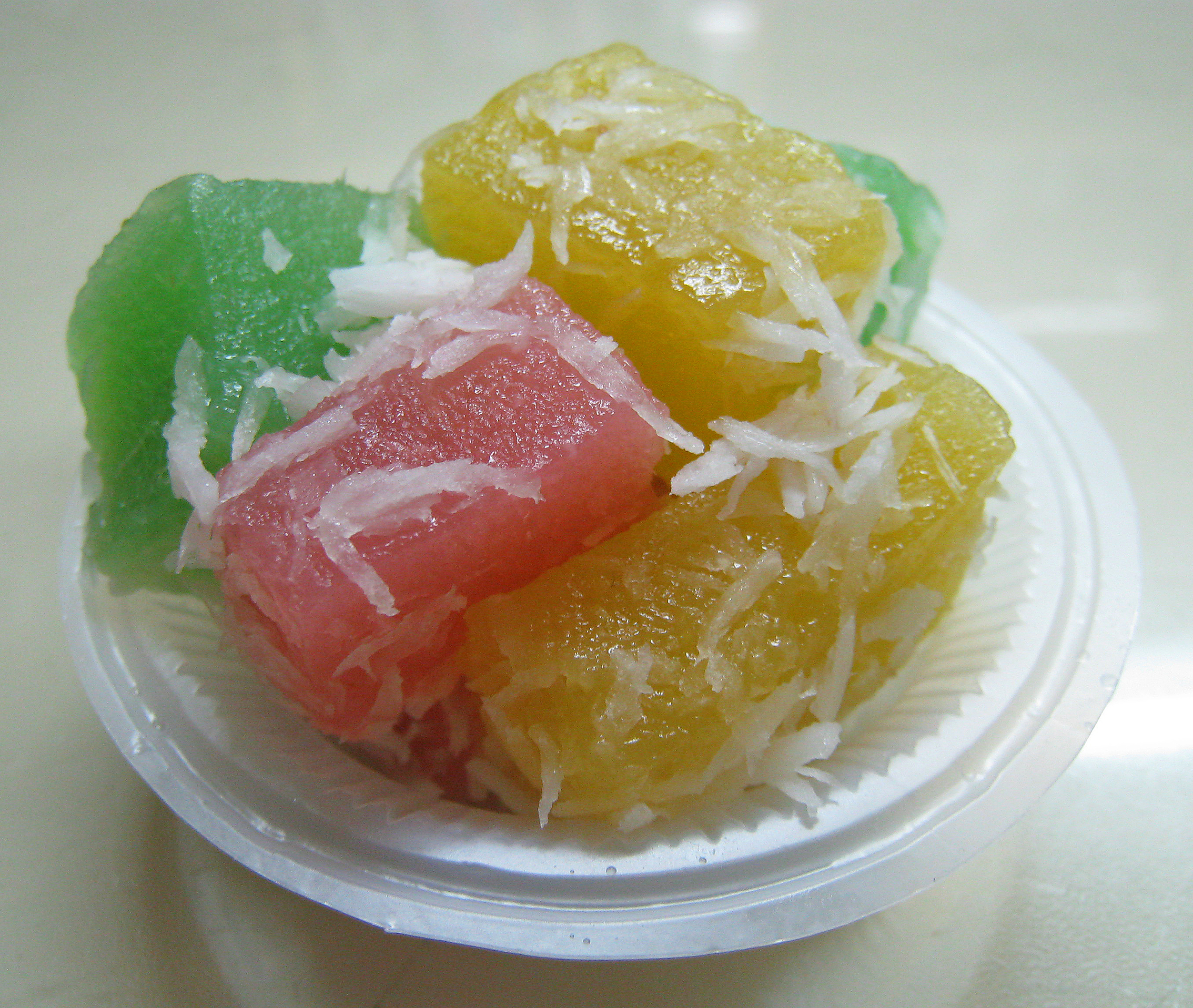
Cenil or cendil

- Tapioca flour mixed with rice flour, made into dough, coloured and steamed
- Salt
- Sugar
- Coated with grated coconut
- Sometimes poured with liquid palm sugar

== See also ==
- List of Indonesian cuisine
- Javanese cuisine
