= Typhoon Bualoi (2019) =

Pacific typhoon in 2019

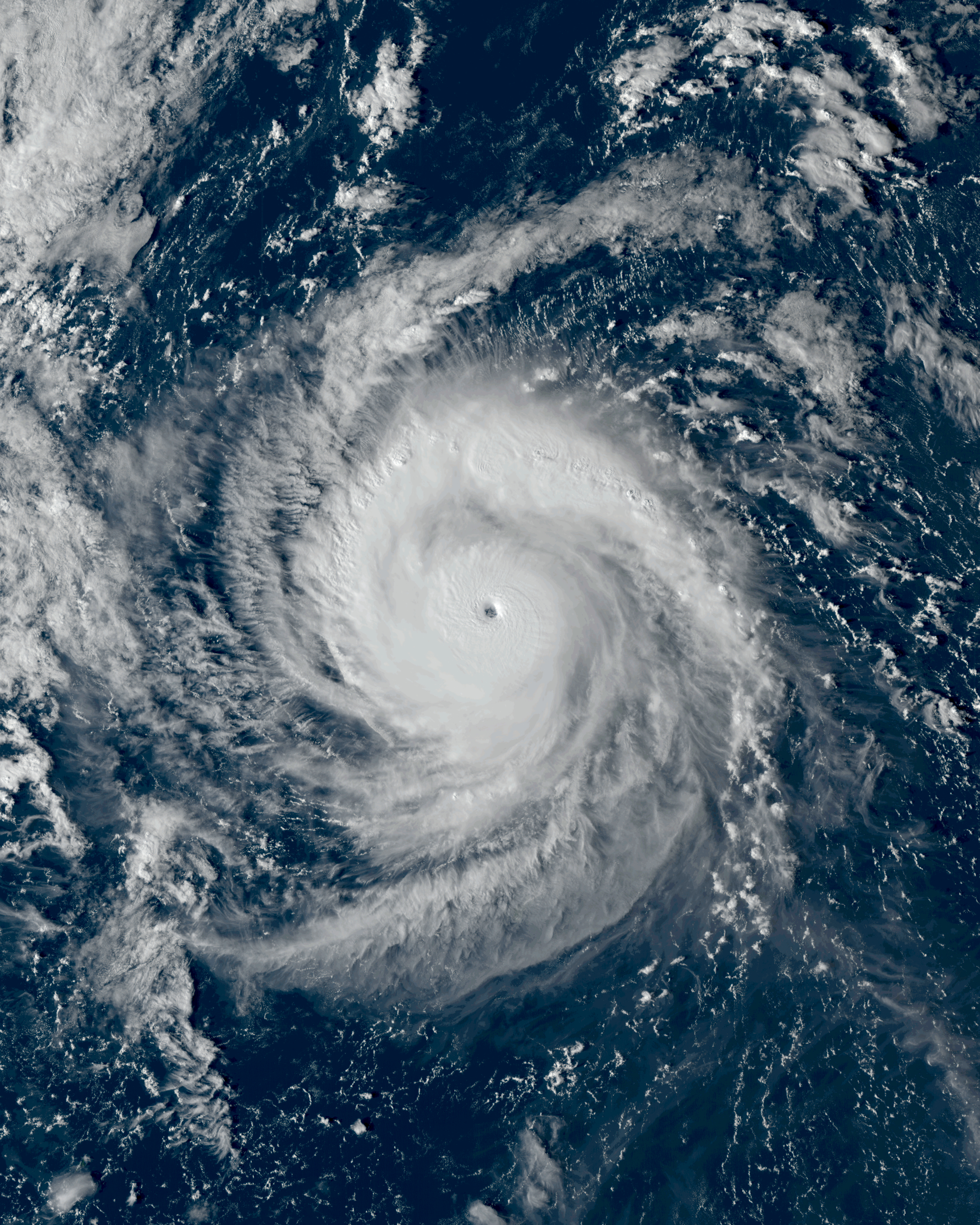
- Bualoi near its peak intensity while north of the Mariana Islands on October 22.

Meteorological history
- Formed: October 18, 2019
- Dissipated: October 25, 2019

Very strong typhoon
- 10-minute sustained (JMA)
- Highest winds: 185 km/h (115 mph)
- Lowest pressure: 935 hPa (mbar); 27.61 inHg

Category 5-equivalent super typhoon
- 1-minute sustained (SSHWS/JTWC)
- Highest winds: 260 km/h (160 mph)
- Lowest pressure: 922 hPa (mbar); 27.23 inHg

Overall effects
- Fatalities: 13
- Injuries: 13
- Damage: >$200 million (2019 USD)
- Areas affected: Caroline Islands, Mariana Islands, Japan
- IBTrACS
- Part of the 2019 Pacific typhoon season

Typhoon Bualoi (Note: The name Bualoi (Thai: บัวลอย, [bua˧ lɔːj˧]) was contributed by Thailand and refers to a Thai dessert in Thai.) was a tropical cyclone that caused flooding over Japan during mid-October 2019. The fortieth tropical depression, twenty-first named storm, and eleventh typhoon of the annual typhoon season, Bualoi originated from a disturbance east of the Marshall Islands on October 17, that quickly organized to a tropical depression on October 19, at which point it was given the designation 22W. Favorable conditions strengthened the depression into a tropical storm, prompting the Japan Meteorological Agency to name it Bualoi. The storm rapidly intensified and became a typhoon on October 20, before its rate of strengthening was stopped by a tropical upper tropospheric trough the following day. The rate was later recommenced through rapid intensification, making Bualoi reach its peak on October 22 as a Category 5-equivalent typhoon, with 10-minute sustained winds of 185 km/h (115 mph) and one-minute sustained winds of 260 km/h (160 mph). Bualoi rapidly weakened on October 23 due to wind shear and continued before transitioning into an extratropical cyclone and dissipating on October 25.

After affecting the Mariana Islands, where an emergency declaration was issued, warm moist air flowed into Bualoi, causing the atmosphere to become unstable and produce torrential rains over Japan on October 25. Around that time, the country was still in the recovery process after Typhoons Faxai and Hagibis had devastated the archipelago. Most of the damage occurred in Chiba Prefecture, though other prefectures such as Miyagi and Fukushima Prefectures, were also affected. Across the prefectures, about half of the 13 fatalities took place in a car as the automobiles were swept or submerged in rivers flooded by the rain, and happened during evacuation. Transportation services were also stopped in the affected areas. About 4,998 houses were destroyed, contributing to the total of over US$200 million in damages.

== Meteorological history ==
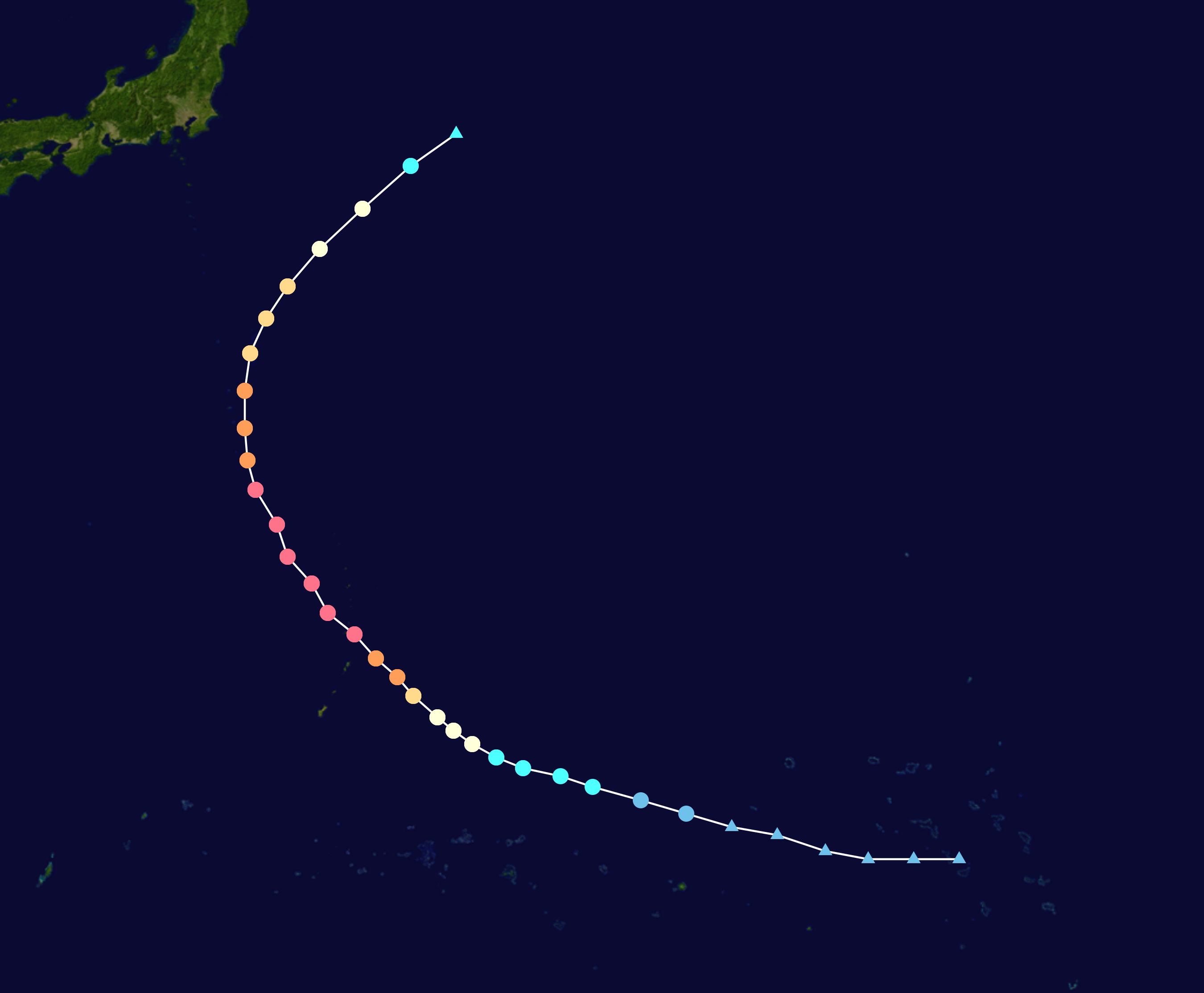
Map plotting the storm's track and intensity, according to the Saffir–Simpson scale (Note: The position of Bualoi's Category 5 peak is not depicted in this graphic as it is an asynoptic point (i.e. not at the 6-hour intervals of all other points) occurring at 09:00 UTC October 22.) Map key Saffir–Simpson scale Tropical depression (≤38 mph, ≤62 km/h) Tropical storm (39–73 mph, 63–118 km/h) Category 1 (74–95 mph, 119–153 km/h) Category 2 (96–110 mph, 154–177 km/h) Category 3 (111–129 mph, 178–208 km/h) Category 4 (130–156 mph, 209–251 km/h) Category 5 (≥157 mph, ≥252 km/h) Unknown Storm type Tropical cyclone Subtropical cyclone Extratropical cyclone, remnant low, tropical disturbance, or monsoon depression

A low-pressure area located just north of Namonuito Atoll persisted on October 16, and generally tracked westward. The area was later reported to have developed into a tropical depression on October 18, according to the Japan Meteorological Agency (JMA). Later that day, the Joint Typhoon Warning Center (JTWC) issued a Tropical Cyclone Formation Alert on the system, designating it Invest 97W, after it was situated under low vertical wind shear and warm sea surface temperatures, being favorable conditions for further development, as flaring atmospheric convection obscured the low-level circulation center (LLCC) of the system. On October 19, the JTWC assigned the disturbance as Tropical Depression 22W. In addition, the depression further strengthened to a tropical storm while forming a central dense overcast (CDO), receiving the name Bualoi from the JMA. Early on October 20, the JMA categorized Bualoi as a severe tropical storm after the storm had 10-minute sustained winds of 90 km/h (55 mph).

The rainbands of the storm tightened around the nascent eye surrounded by cold cloud tops. While steering northwestward from a subtropical ridge, Bualoi intensified to a typhoon after further consolidation with improved deep banding. However, a tropical upper tropospheric trough (TUTT) cell to the northwest subdued outflow, stopping the rate of strengthening, which by that point the storm had 1-minute sustained winds of 140 km/h (85 mph). Bualoi later recommenced its development and rapidly intensified on October 21 while passing north of Saipan after sea temperatures remained favorable, despite the storm converging with the TUTT cell. Satellite imagery revealed the symmetrical system and its 19-kilometre-wide (10-nautical-mile) eye on October 22, with rainbands circulating around the center.

At 09:00 UTC Bualoi reached its peak intensity, with 10-minute sustained winds of 185 km/h (115 mph) and the lowest barometric pressure of 935 hPa (27.61 inHg) as estimated by the JMA, and 1-minute sustained winds of 260 km/h (160 mph) according to the JTWC, being equivalent to a Category 5 hurricane on the Saffir–Simpson hurricane wind scale. On October 23, its eye became cloud-filled, and despite good environmental conditions, Bualoi began gradually weakening as it tracked northeastward. The CDO had elongated to the north of the LLCC as a result of stronger wind shear. Winds from the northeast of Chichijima contributed to placing the center south-southeast of the island. By October 24, the deep convection in the south quadrant of the storm became sheared while tracking poleward. The convection was later displaced slightly northeast of the obscured LLCC on October 25, before being sheared, leading to Bualoi transitioning to an extratropical cyclone.

== Preparations, impact, and aftermath ==
=== Mariana Islands ===
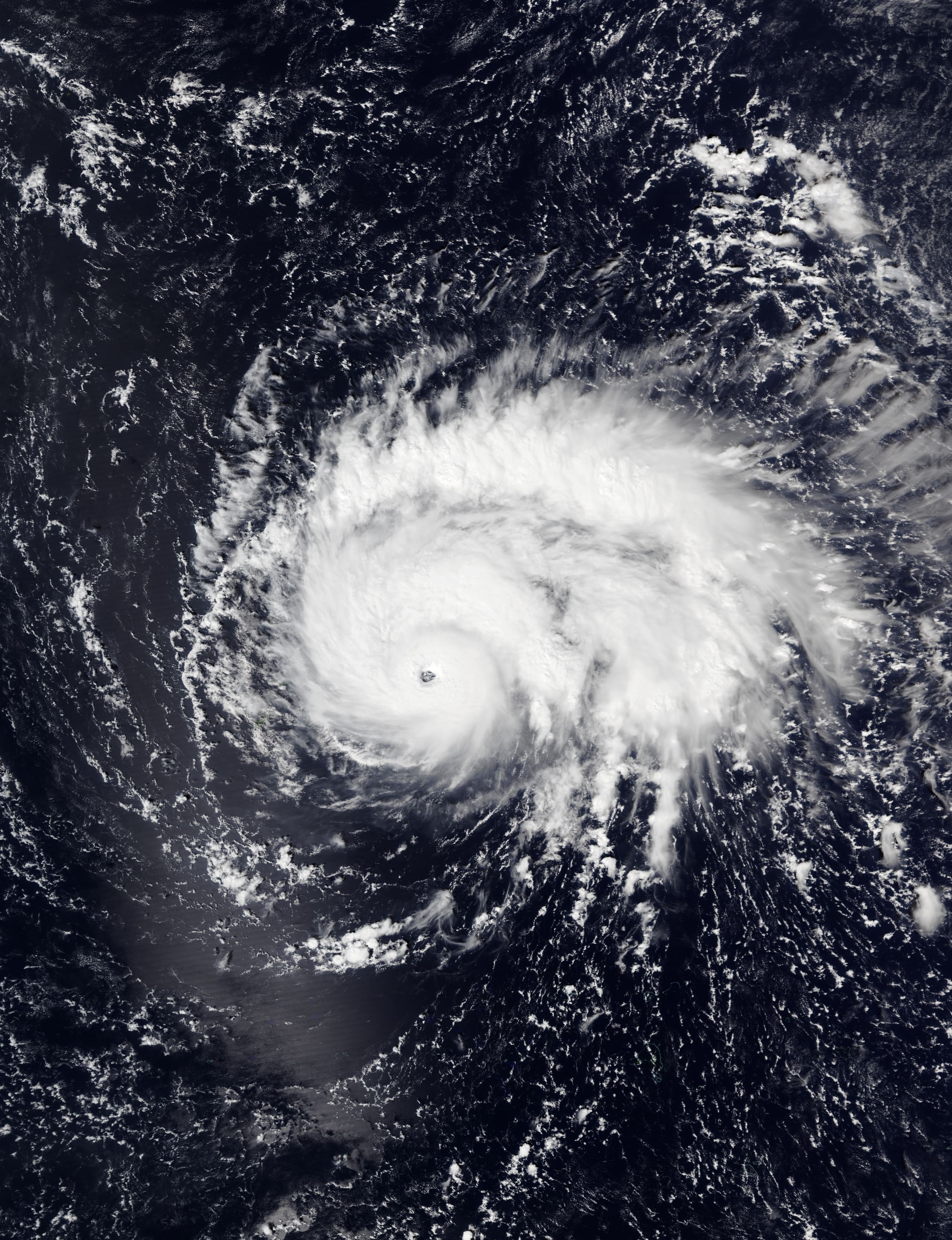
Bualoi rapidly intensifying while approaching the Mariana Islands on October 21.

Ahead of Bualoi in the Mariana Islands, a Typhoon Warning was put in effect for the islands of Saipan and Tinian, with a Typhoon Watch in effect for Rota. Meanwhile, Tropical Storm Watches were posted for the islands of Alamagan, Pagan, and Guam. These were all discontinued by October 21. Northern Mariana Islands Lieutenant Governor Arnold Palacios placed the territory under Typhoon Condition 3 on October 19. This was upgraded to Typhoon Condition 4 by October 21. A federal emergency declaration was approved for the islands by the first Trump administration. Schools and government buildings were closed with the threat of the typhoon on October 21. The Commonwealth Utilities Corp. turned off water access ahead of Bualoi as a precaution. As Bualoi neared its passage through the Mariana Islands, flash flood alerts and heavy rain warnings were put in effect.

The Federal Emergency Management Agency (FEMA) provided aid to the Northern Mariana Islands after U.S. president Donald Trump signed the emergency declaration from the Commonwealth on October 20.

=== Japan ===
Hourly precipitation of October 25–26 in Japan Standard Time, of Tōhoku, Kantō, and Chūbu.

Japan, mainly Chiba and Fukushima Prefectures, was still recovering from Typhoons Faxai and Hagibis. Warm, moist air flowed into the typhoon and caused Bualoi to flow excessive rain upon the prefecture on October 25, despite not reaching land. Advisories were issued across the country and evacuations took place. According to the Fire and Disaster Management Agency, 26 casualties were reported; 13 people were killed and 13 were injured, with 5 of the injuries being serious. 4,998 houses were damaged across the country, according to the agency. Total losses were finalized at over US$200 million.

Damages such as floods and the flooding of rivers and landslides mainly occurred in the Chiba Prefecture. About half of the fatalities occurred in a car, such as when the car was submerged or washed away by the river while evacuating by car. In Chiba Prefecture, two landslides occurred in Midori-ku, Yokohama, killing two men and women in their 60s and a woman in her 40s. A landslide also occurred in Ichihara, killing a woman in her 50s. In Mobara, a man died after being swept away by a river. Another report claimed that a woman was seen being swept into the river, after which she was found dead. In Nagara, one man was found in each of the two cars, but both died. In Chōnan, two men died from similar damage. A man in his 80s was also found dead in Sakura. In Sōma, Fukushima, a woman in her 60s was found dead after a river that flowed through the city overflowed. Her son was reported missing before being found dead at Matsukawa-ura Bay.

The town of Marumori in Miyagi Prefecture, which was severely damaged by Typhoon Hagibis two weeks ago, including the disruption of railroads, suffered further damage, with more than 100 mm (3.9 in) of rain falling on the 25th. 27 rivers were flooded. Damage also occurred outside the expected inundation areas on the hazard maps created by local governments. Not only the public hall and city hall, which had been used as evacuation centers, were flooded, but deaths also occurred in the roads. In Mobara, Chiba Prefecture, which was flooded in the Ichinomiya River basin, the city hall and the central public hall, which are both outside the expected flooding area, were flooded. About 23,400 households in Chiba had lost power, and up to 4,700 households had lost water.

Due to the torrential rain, all public transportation systems stopped working, and roads were flooded one after another. The up and down lines between the Ibaraki Airport Kita and Hokota junctions on the Higashi-Kantō Expressway, and the inner and outer loops of the Mobara-Kita and Ichihara-Tsurumai junctions on the Ken-Ō Expressway were closed. On the following day, the 26th, most of the railway lines resumed operation, but on the East Japan Railway Company between Enokido Station and Naruto Station on the Sobu Main Line, the soil under the tracks was washed away, so operations resumed on October 28. However, due to fallen trees and landslides between Kururi Station and Kazusa-Kameyama Station on the Kururi Line, operation resumed on November 1. The Chiba Green Bus, which has its head office and sales office in Sakura, which was heavily damaged, flooded the nearby Kashima River in the early morning of the 26th, submerging the bus garage. It was damaged to be scrapped.

The Cabinet Office Emergency Disaster Response Headquarters responded to the disaster in parallel with the response to Typhoon Hagibis. In addition, two disaster dispatches were carried out by the Self-Defense Forces.

== See also ==
- Weather of 2019
- Tropical cyclones in 2019
- Other systems named Bualoi
- Typhoon Mindulle (2021)
