= Mont phet htok =

Pyramid rice dumpling

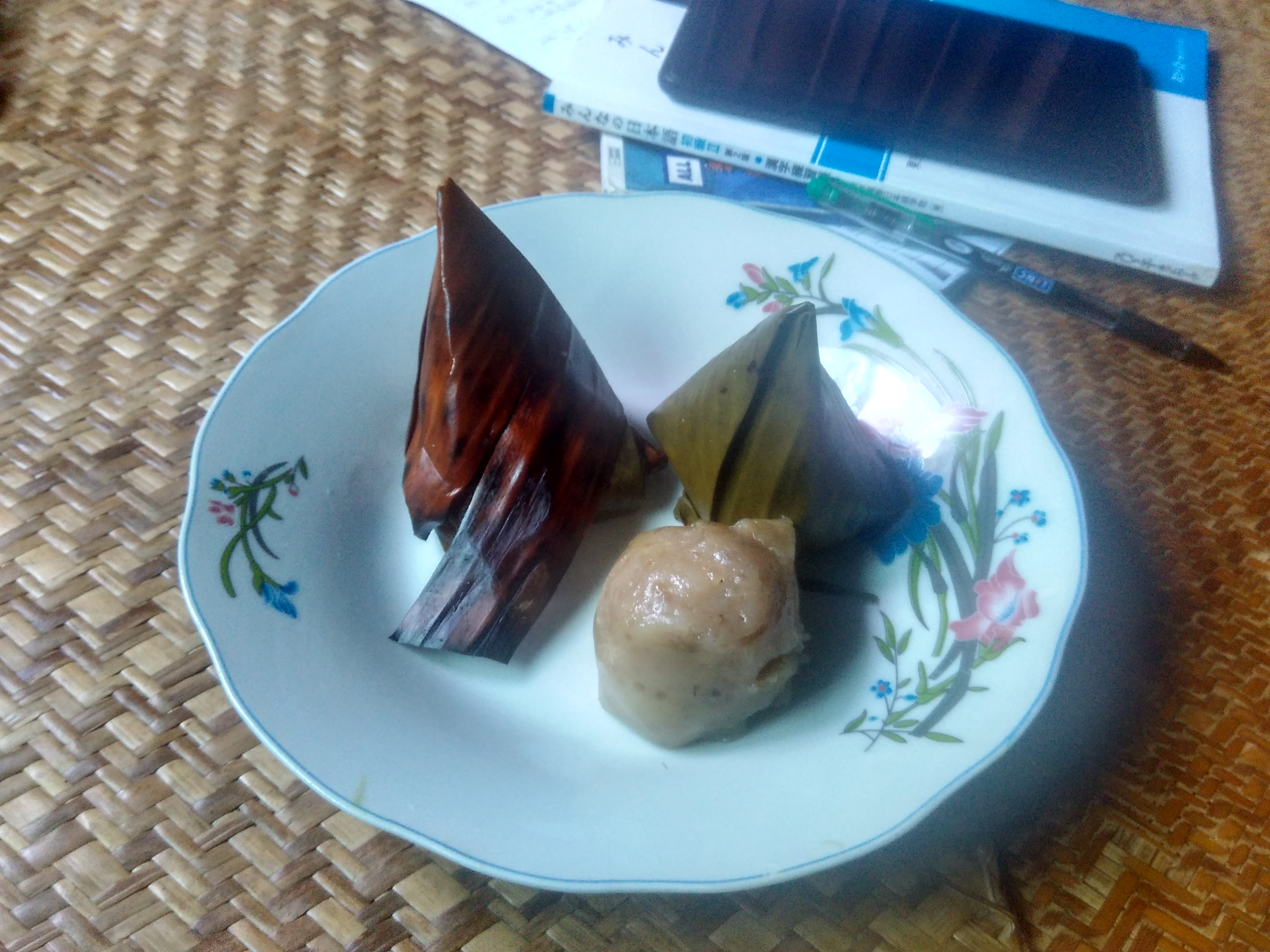
- Type: Snack
- Place of origin: Myanmar (Burma)
- Region or state: Southeast Asia
- Associated cuisine: Burmese
- Main ingredients: Rice flour, coconut meat, jaggery, sugar, banana leaf
- Similar dishes: Kue kochi, Zongzi

Mont phet htok (Burmese: မုန့်ဖက်ထုပ်; pronounced [mo̰ʊɴ pʰɛʔ tʰoʊʔ]), also known as htapana htok (Burmese: ဌာပနာထုပ်) in Upper Myanmar), is a traditional Burmese snack or mont.

The dish is a pyramidal rice dumpling filled with coconut meat, which is cooked in sugar or jaggery, and then steamed in banana leaves.

== Similar dishes ==
Similar desserts in the region include Vietnamese bánh phu thê and Chinese zongzi.
