= Modak =

South and Southeast Asian sweet dumpling dish

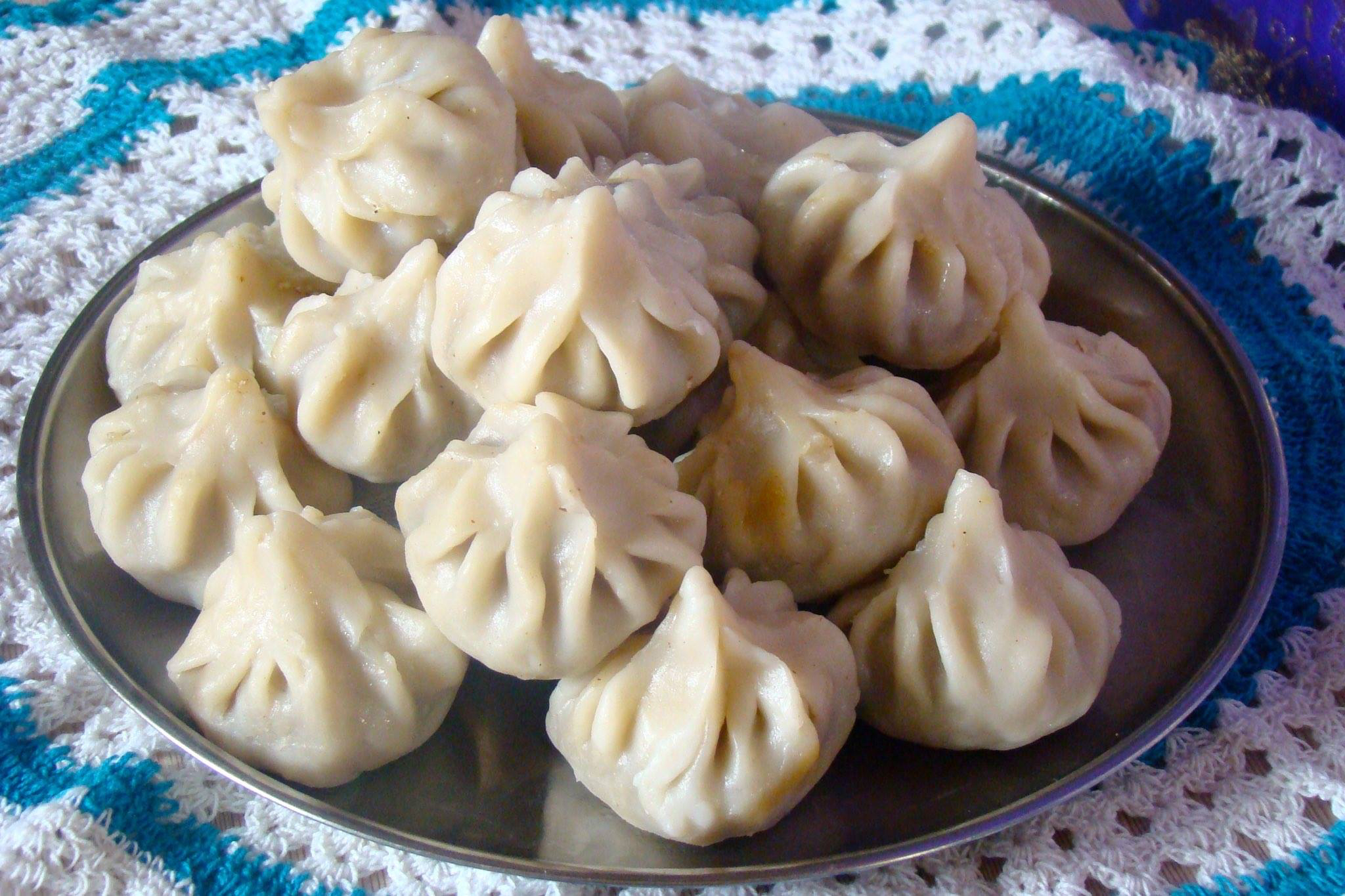
- Alternative names: Koḻukattai; Kangidan (歓喜団); Mont lone yay baw (မုန့်လုံးရေပေါ်); Khanom tom (ขนมต้ม); Khanom kho (ขนมโค); Num kom (នំគម); Kanom nab (ເຂົ້າຫນົມແຫນບ); Bánh ít nhân dừa Kuih modak Kue modak
- Course: Dessert
- Place of origin: India
- Region or state: India, Sri Lanka, Japan, Vietnam, Thailand, Laos, Cambodia, Myanmar, Malaysia, Indonesia, Brunei, Singapore
- Main ingredients: Rice flour, or wheat, coconut, jaggery
- Similar dishes: Bánh phu thê (Vietnam); Cenil (Indonesia); Khanom tom/khanom kho (Thailand); Klepon (Indonesia); Kue kochi (Indonesia and Malaysia); Mont lone yay baw (Myanmar); Mont phet htok (Myanmar)

Modak (Marathi: मोदक), modakam (Sanskrit: मोदकम्), kolukattai or modaka (Kannada: ಮೋದಕ), also referred to as jilledukayalu in Telugu (జిల్లేడుకాయలు) is an Indian sweet dish popular in many Indian states and cultures. According to Hindu and Buddhist beliefs, it is one of the favourite dishes of Ganesha and the Buddha and is therefore used in prayers. The sweet filling inside a modak consists of freshly grated coconut and jaggery, while the outer soft shell is made from rice flour or wheat flour mixed with khowa or maida flour.

There are two distinct varieties of Modak, fried and steamed. The steamed version (called Ukadiche Modak) is often served hot with ghee.

== History ==
According to culinary historian Darra Goldstein, modaka is an ancient sweet that dates back to around 200 BCE. Early mentions of modaka are found in Ayurveda, Ramayana and Mahabharata where it is described as a dumpling confectionery with sweet stuffing. Sangam literature similarly mentions modakas as rice dumplings filled with sweet stuffing that were also sold by street vendors in the ancient city of Madurai. The medieval Manasollasa culinary text explains that modakas, as prepared with rice flour and a sweet stuffing with aromatic spices such as cardamom and camphor, were called Varsopalagolakas because they looked like hailstones. Fried modakas are made with wheat flour, while steamed modakas are made from rice flour.

In both Hindu and Buddhist contexts, the word 'modaka' is explained as being derived from the words "Moda" and "Pramoda", meaning joy, happiness, delight; modakas being gifts that Ganesha, the god of good luck, and the Buddha bestows on their devotees. The shape of modaka is also said to represent a bag of money. Thus, it is also used to symbolize wealth, and all the sweet pleasures that wealth gives to humans. In a Tantric context, its shape is seen to symbolise an upward pointing triangle, which in Tantric art represents Shiva, i.e. spiritual reality, in contrast to the downward pointing triangle, which represents Shakti, material reality.

== Religious significance ==
=== Hinduism ===
Modak is considered to be the favourite sweet of the Hindu deity, Ganesha. From it, he gets the moniker modakapriya (one who likes modak) in Sanskrit. The word modak means "small part of bliss" and it symbolises spiritual knowledge. During Ganesh Chaturthi, the puja usually concludes with an offering of 21 or 101 modaks to Ganesha. Modaks made with rice flour shells are often preferred for this purpose, although wheat shell versions are also used. Local businesses outside Ganesh temples across India usually sell pre-packed/ready-made versions of modaks.

=== Buddhism ===
Modak is also considered to be the favourite sweet of Gautama Buddha. During Buddha's Birthday, modaks are offered to the Buddha.

== Similar dishes ==
=== India and Sri Lanka ===
In India and Sri Lanka, modak has a lot of ingrained historical and cultural significance, with variations all over the two countries. It is known by different names by different linguistic communities, such as modak in Marathi (मोदक), nevri in Konkani (नेवरी), mandaa in Odia (ମଣ୍ଡା), kadubu in Kannada (ಕಡುಬು), kozhukattai in Tamil (கொழுக்கட்டை), kozhukatta in Malayalam (കൊഴുക്കട്ട), jilledukayalu in Telugu (జిల్లేడుకాయలు) and lavariya in Sinhala (ලවාරියා).

=== Cambodia ===
In Cambodia, num kom (នំគម) is similar to modak. However, the wrapping is much different as num kom does not use rice flour.

=== Japan ===
In Japan, a sweet similar to modak that replaced cinnamon with cardamom and known locally as kangidan (歓喜団), is offered to both the god Kangiten, the Japanese equivalent of Ganesh. Kangidans are made from curds, honey, and red bean paste. They are wrapped in kneaded dough made from parched flour and shaped like a bun before they are deep fried. However, as the majority of Japanese are non-religious, it can be eaten on any occasion such as Shōgatsu, Culture Day, Christmas, Halloween, birthdays and retirement parties.

=== Laos ===
In Laos, modaks are known as kanom nab (ເຂົ້າຫນົມແຫນບ).

=== Malay world ===
In the Malay world, modaks are known as kuih modak (in Malaysia, Brunei and Singapore) or kue modak (in Indonesia). There are also similar types of modak such as klepon, kue kochi and cenil.

=== Myanmar ===
In Myanmar, modaks are known as mont lone yay baw and mont phet htok the former are eaten during Thingyan.

=== Thailand ===
In Thailand, Khanom tom and khanom kho are said to be the close cousins of modaks due to their similarities. However, they come in other colours and are covered in coconuts shreds.

=== Vietnam ===
In Vietnam, modaks are known as bánh ít nhân dừa or bánh phu thê.

== Varieties ==
Type	Characteristics
Steamed modak (ukadiche modak in the Marathi language)	Made of coconut and sugar/jaggery. This variation is especially prepared during the Ganesh Festival. They are hand-made and cooked in a steamer. They are perishable and need to be consumed immediately.
Fried modak	Deep fried in oil instead of being steamed. Frying makes the modaks last longer and gives them a different taste.
Mawa modak	These are khoa (milk solids) based preparations that are shaped like a modak. A variety of flavors can be obtained by addition of materials such as pistachio, cardamom, chocolate, and almond.

== See also ==
- List of dumplings
- List of foods with religious symbolism
- List of Indian sweets and desserts
- Maharashtrian cuisine
- Mandu
- Manti
- Mont lone yay baw
- Kangiten
- Khanom kho
