= Mont lone yay baw =

Burmese dessert and snack

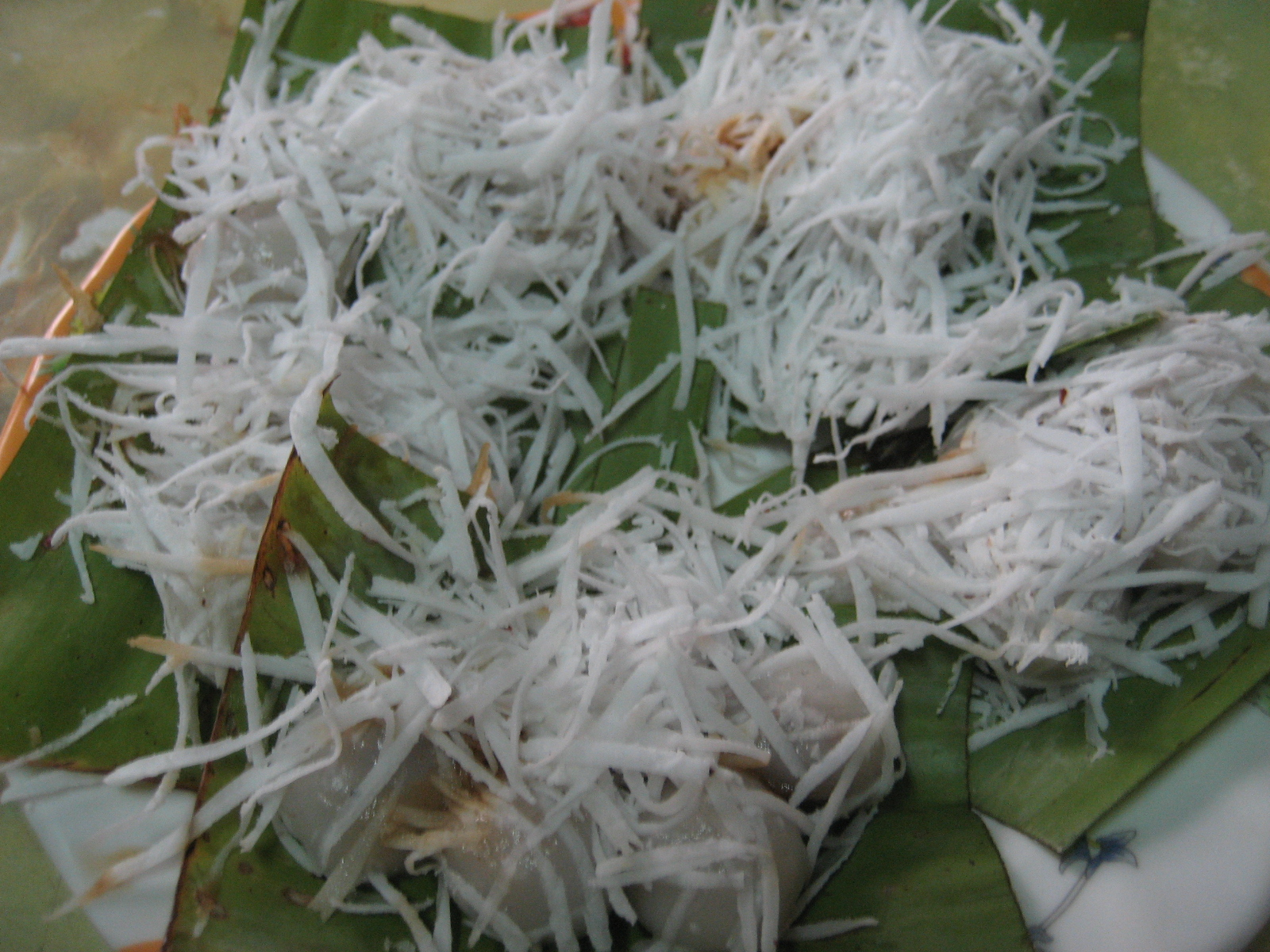
- Type: Dessert
- Place of origin: Myanmar (Burma)
- Region or state: Southeast Asia
- Associated cuisine: Burmese
- Main ingredients: Glutinous rice flour; jaggery; shredded coconut
- Similar dishes: klepon, bua loi, khanom kho, tangyuan, modak, kozhukkatta

Mont lone yay baw (Burmese: မုန့်လုံးရေပေါ်; pronounced [mo̰ʊɴlóʊɴjèbɔ̀]; also spelt mont lone yay paw) are rice balls stuffed with sweet palm jaggery, eaten as a dessert in Myanmar. It is commonly associated with the Burmese New Year, Thingyan season, when it is usually made in a group and served to the public as a good deed.

== Preparation ==
Mont lone yay baw is prepared by sifting glutinous rice flour, white rice flour, baking soda and salt into a bowl, adding water, and kneading into a dough. Rice balls around 2.5 centimetres (1.0 in) in diameter are formed from the dough, which are flattened and filled with palm jaggery and then enclosed. When several have been made, the balls are boiled until they float, cooled, then served on a banana leaf or plate, sprinkled with shredded coconut. They are served warm. After a few days of refrigeration they harden, producing a chewier texture.

Regional variations include adding syrup jaggery or solid jaggery as fillings, adding food colouring to the rice flour, or accompanying the dish with desiccated coconuts. Similar desserts in the region include Indian modak, Malaysian onde-onde, Indonesian klepon, Thai bua loi, and the Chinese tangyuan.

== In Burman culture ==
The precise date or timeline of when and where in Myanmar mont lone yay baw was first originated is not well-documented, although locally it is believed to be centuries old. Preparations now vary across regions. Mont lone yay baw is sold in Myanmar in marketplaces and by roadside vendors to be eaten as a snack.

During Thingyan (Burmese New Year water festival), mont lone yay baw is eaten as a snack during water fights, while visiting pagodas or attending cultural events. It is considered able to maintain energy levels. In line with the festival's value of community, making mont lone yay baw is regarded as a way of building relationships, as is the act of sharing the final snack with friends and passer-bys. A prank during the festival involves adding spicy chilis to mont lone yay baw and giving it to unsuspecting friends or family.

== Gallery ==
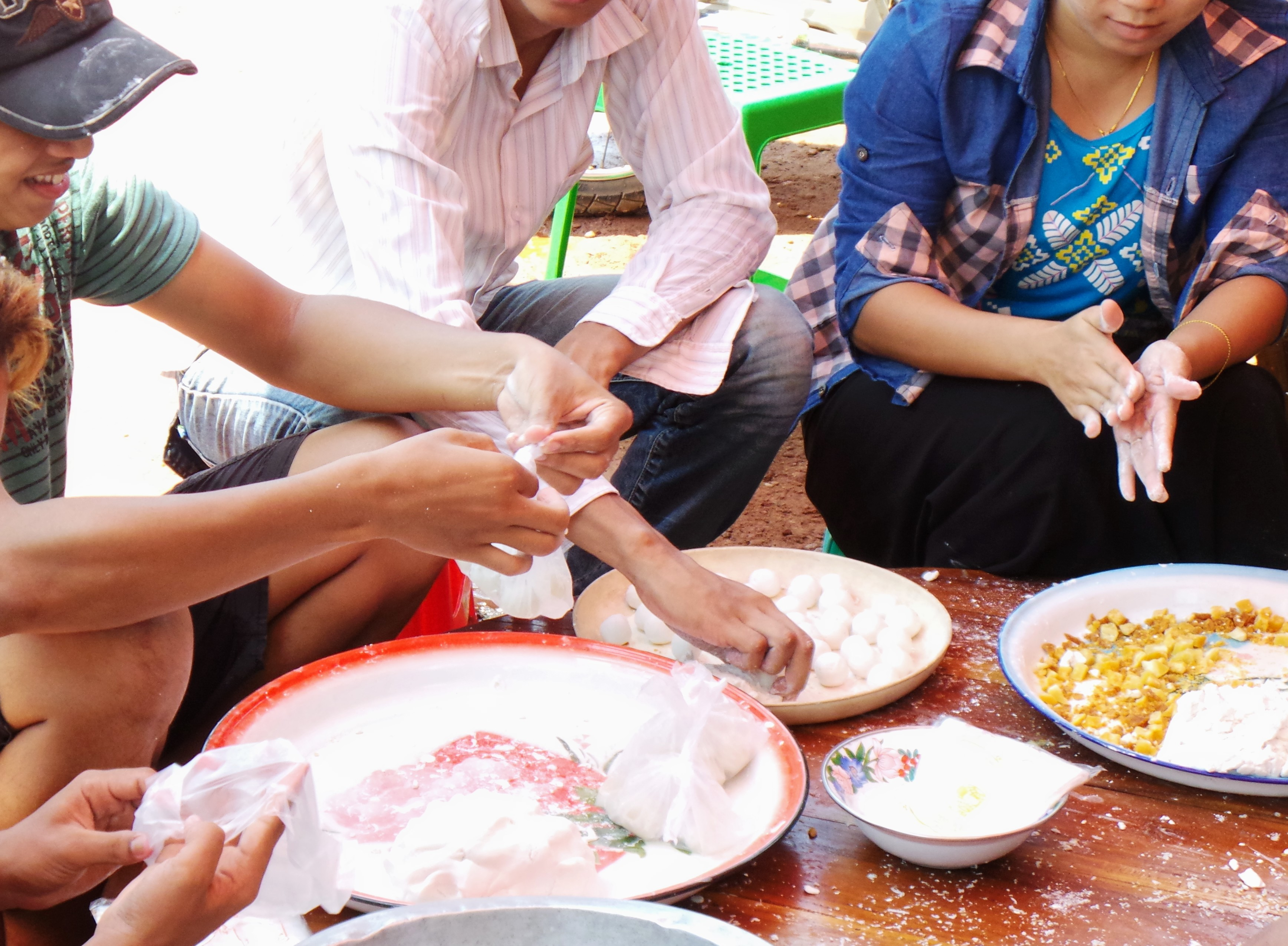
A group making mont lone yay baw

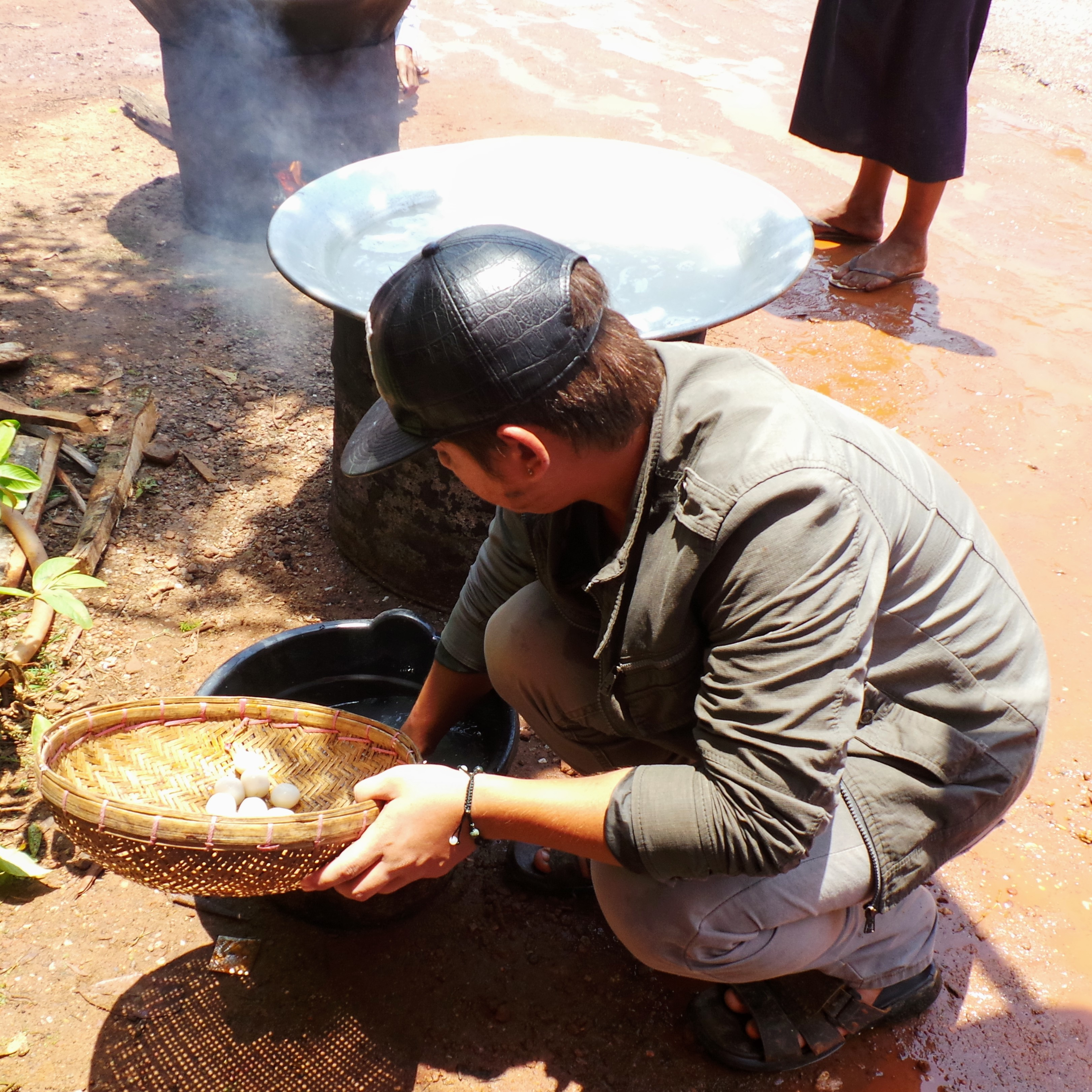
Preparing mont lone yay baw by a roadside

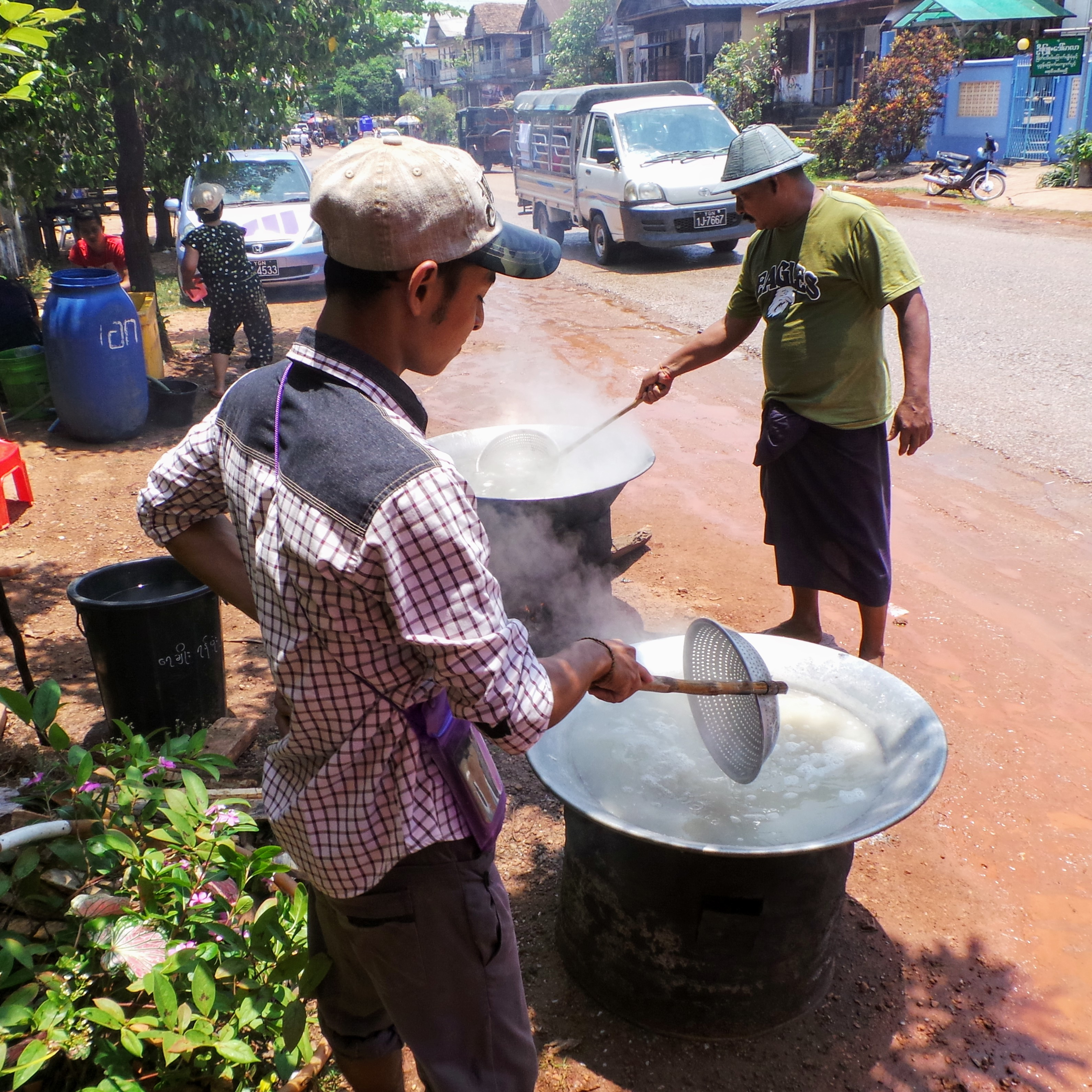
Boiling
