= Bua loi =

Thai dessert

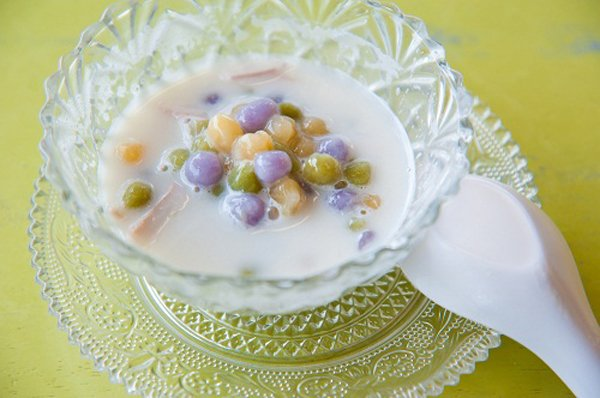
Bualoi Boiled flour balls with coconut milk

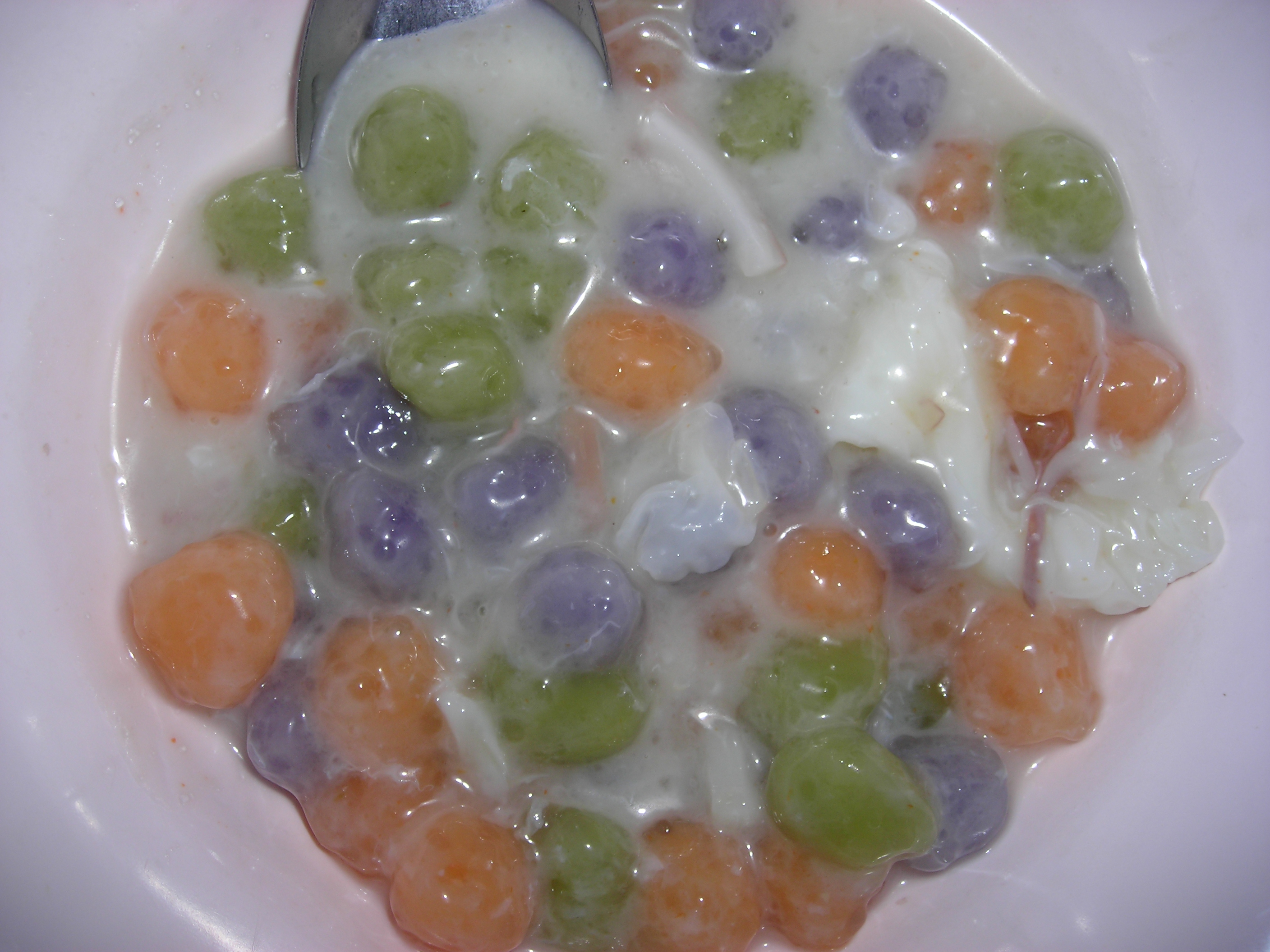
Bua loi khai wan, bua loi with sweet-poached egg, is a common variant.

Bua loi or bua loy (Thai: บัวลอย, pronounced [būa lɔ̄ːj], lit. 'floating lotus') is a Thai dessert. It consists of rice flour rolled into small balls, and cooked in coconut milk and sugar. Some Bua loi also adds sweet egg into the recipe. It was inspired by Tangyuan, a Chinese dessert that is traditionally eaten around the Lantern festival. Bua Loi is also traditionally eaten during the Dongzhi Festival in Thailand, which is a festival for the Chinese-Thai bloodline. There are a variety of versions of Bua loi such as ones that use food coloring instead of natural color, use soy milk instead of Coconut cream, add sliced pumpkin inside the rice balls, et cetera. There are other types of Bua loi from other countries such as China, Japan, Indonesia, Myanmar, Philippines, Southern Vietnam and Malaysia.

== History ==
Some Thai foods take inspiration and are adapted from other countries, such as from Portugal and China. The origin of Bua loi is around the Ayutthaya period by Maria Guyomar de Pinha or Thao Thong Kip Ma. Her father Fanik Guyomar from the Portuguese colony of Goa, was a Bengali Christian of mixed Portuguese and Japanese descent. Her mother was a Japanese and Portuguese woman named Ursula Yamada, whose family had emigrated to Thailand following the repression of Christianity in Japan during King Naresuan the Great period. In 1682, Maria married Constantine Phaulkon after he abandoned Anglicanism for Catholicism to show his sincerity. They had two sons, George "Jorge" Phaulkon and Constantin "João" Phaulkon, and lived a life of affluence as Phaulkon rose to become highly influential at the royal court of king Narai. During her government service as head of royal utensils caretaker, she taught Thai people how to cook various desserts, such as Thong Yip (pinched gold egg yolks), Thong Yot (gold egg-yolks drops), and Foi Thong (in Portuguese called Fios de ovos mean "egg threads"). The first types of dessert were Kaikob, Nokprow, Ai Tue, and Bua Loi (At that time, the Bua Loi recipe used popped rice instead of glutinous rice flour ).

In the King Narai period, Chinese peoples evacuated to Thailand to trade and work, including working on cuisine for the palace. From the record, Bua Loi is inspired by Tang Yuan. When peanut was brought from the Philippines and white/black sesame entered China from Central Asia during the Han era, Bua Loi or "Tang Yuan" had a variety of fillings. The black sesame paste in ginger juice or Bua Loi in ginger broth is the most well-liked.

In the King Rama I period, in the memo of Krom Luang Narintharathewi, wrote about the Celebration of the Emerald Buddha in 1809. During the festival, There're sweet decks for 2000 monks with are Chicken filling dessert, Foi Thong, Khanom Phing, Kluai Khaek, Rhum, Lhateang, Sangkhaya, and dessert in Kap Ho Khlong Hae boat to the sweet savory dishes poem. It is a royal poem written by Rama I praising desserts such as Khao Niao Sangkhaya, Lam Chiak dessert, Thong Yip, Bua Loi, et cetera.

Around the Chulalongkorn period, Thai cuisine recipes began to be published and officially recorded. Mae Khrua Hua Pa was the first Thai cookbook published by Lady Plian Phasakorawong. This cookbook is about a Thai tray of food recipes for monks which includes a Bua loi recipe.

Bua Loi is a Thai dessert used with pairs on auspicious ceremonies, make merit or festivals.

=== Dongzhi Festival ===
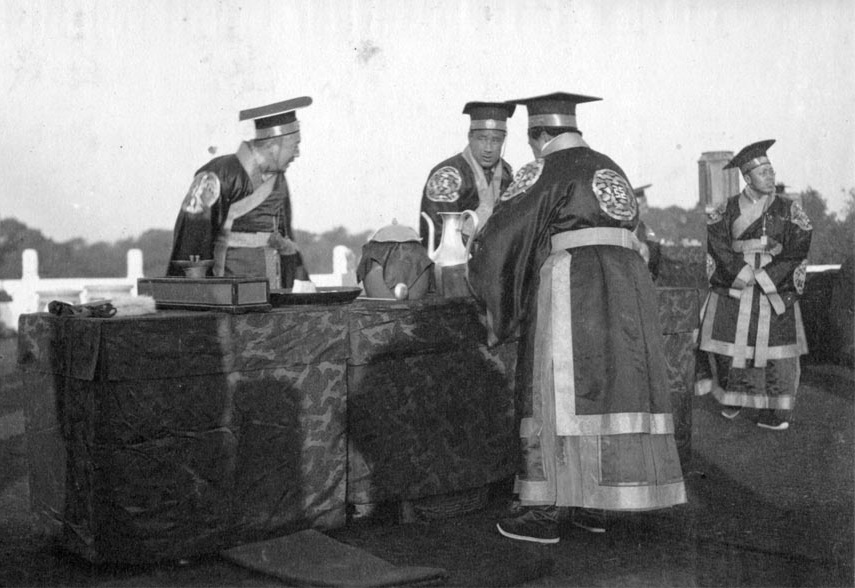
Dongzhi Festival is one of the most important Chinese festivals celebrated by the Mainland Chinese, Hong Kong Chinese, Taiwanese, Japanese, Vietnamese, Koreans and other East Asian-related people included Thailand during the Dongzhi solar term (winter solstice).

Dongzhi Festival, or Chinese Winter Solstice Festival, is a festival to mark the Winter Solstice – the day of the year with the shortest daylight (known as the shortest day). Traditionally, the holiday is celebrated around the 22nd of December each year. It is the last festival of the year for Thais of Chinese descent. During the festival, people usually cook Bua Loi to pay respect to the guardian spirit for helping the family to have a smooth life throughout the year and to pray for family safety. For the Dongzhi Festival, incense burners, red candles, incense, fruits, tea, and Bua Loi are used for worship.

=== Yuan Xiao Festival ===
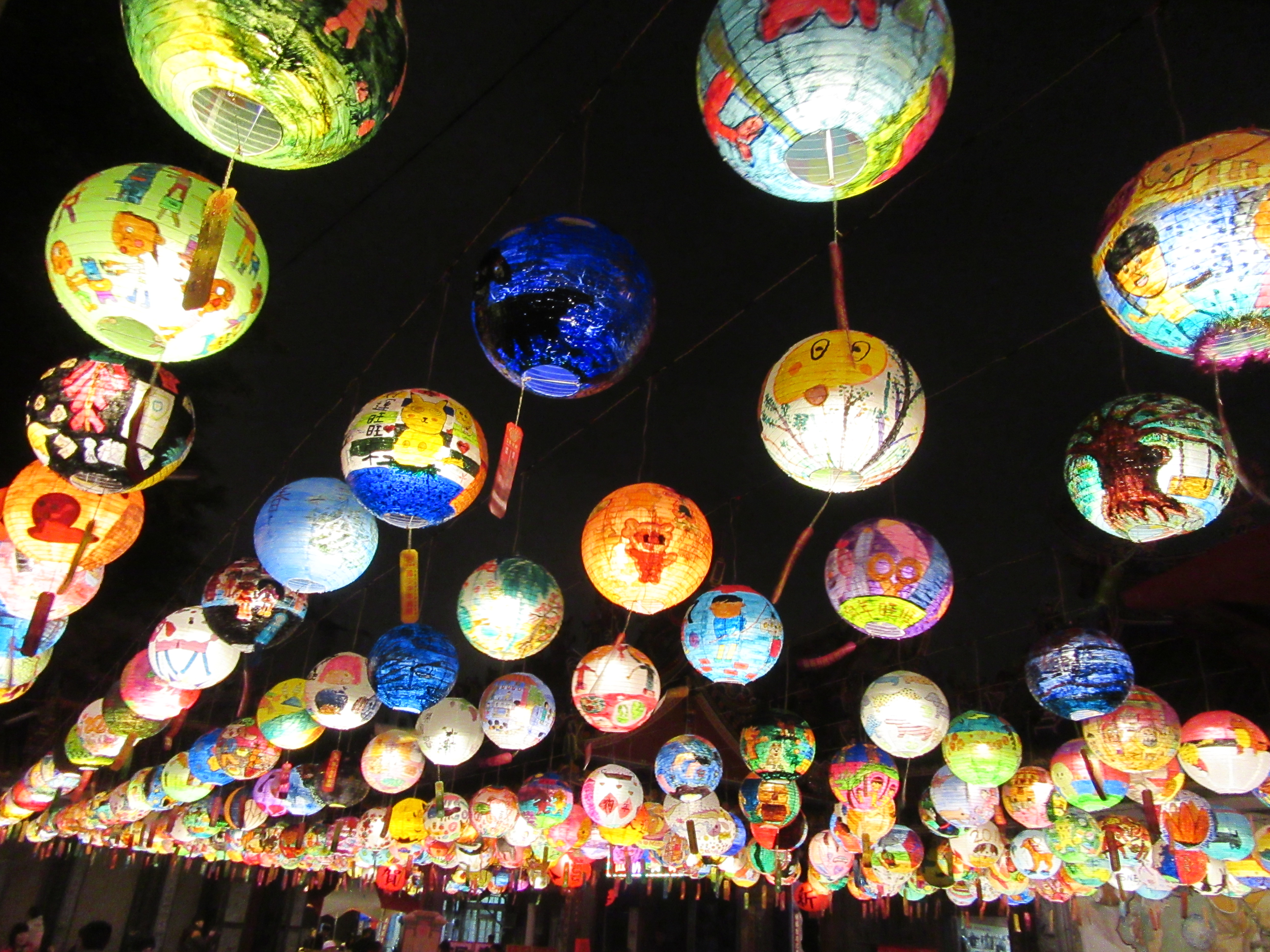
Yuan xiao Festival or Lantern Festival

People in Thailand refer to "元宵节" as the "Yuan Xiao Festival" or the "Lantern Festival." Chinese people place high importance on this holiday. According to the lunar calendar, a full moon first appears after the Chinese New Year. It symbolizes the end of New Year's festivities. Chinese people enjoy eating the Bua Loy dessert on that day because they think it will bring wealth to their families and themselves. They also go outside to view lanterns displayed along streets. There are a large number of Chinese Thai people in Thailand. When there are significant Chinese holidays, they frequently gather together to celebrate. Another important celebration is Yuan Xiao Festival. Chinatown (Yaowarat) in Bangkok and Chinese-Thai communities around the country celebrate the Yuan Xiao Festival yearly by preserving old Chinese traditions.

== Other countries ==
In other countries, there are desserts that are similar to Bua Loi. For example:

=== China ===
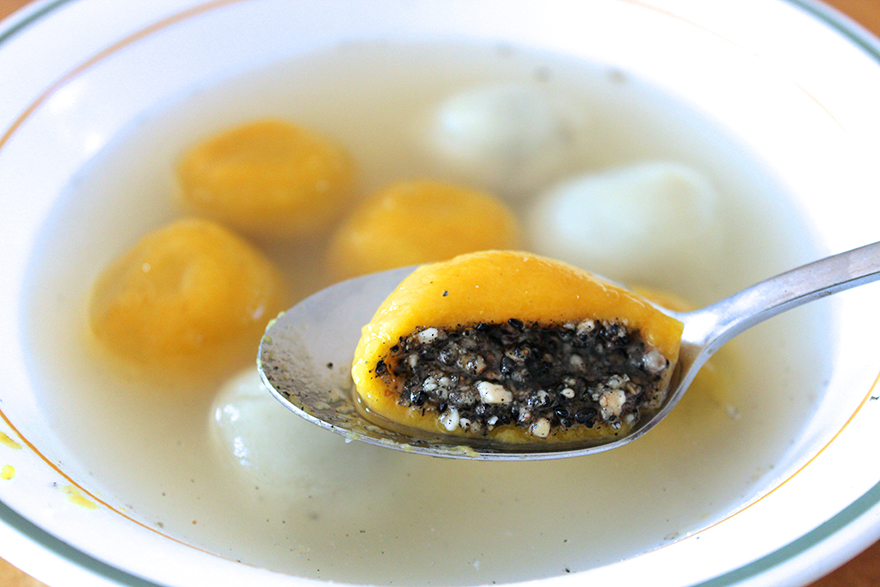
Tangyuan

Tang yuan, or sweet soup balls, are created with water and glutinous rice flour. Glutinous rice balls can be filled with various sweet ingredients, including sesame seeds, peanuts, lotus seed paste, and sweet red bean paste (Anko). More people are filling them with inventive flavors like durian, chocolate, and taro paste. They can be deep-fried or cooked in water or syrup.

=== Southern India ===
Paal Kozhukkattai is a traditional dessert that originated in Southern India— particularly Tamil Nadu and Kerala. The dish closely resembles Bua Loi, as both feature glutinous rice balls immersed in a sweetened coconut milk base. In Paal Kozhukkattai, the rice balls are typically made from freshly ground rice flour that is kneaded into a smooth dough, and shaped into small spheres. While they are often plain, some variations include a filling of melted palm sugar or jaggery.

The rice balls are simmered gently in a mixture of coconut milk and palm sugar syrup until cooked. Some recipes may also incorporate cardamom, saffron, or even roasted cashews and raisins to add more flavour.

Paal Kozhukkattai holds cultural and religious significance, as it is often prepared during festivals such as Ganesh Chaturthi, Navaratri, and other occasions. It is also commonly offered as prasadam to temple and village deities.

=== Indonesia ===
An Indonesian version of Tangyuan, a Chinese glutinous rice ball served in a hot broth or syrup, is called Wedang Ronde. Wedang is the Javanese word for beverage, and Ronde is a Dutch word for the round. The round, sugar- and the crushed peanut-filled ball are composed of glutinous rice flour. The method used to create the ball is similar to creating the Klepon. The sticky balls are served in a sweet ginger soup made with pandan leaves, fresh ginger, and palm sugar.

=== Japan ===
Mochigome, or short-grain glutinous rice, is used to make mochi or Japanese rice cake. The rice is cooked first, then mashed and pounded. They are beautiful round buns made of chewy, soft rice. For many years, rice cake has been regarded as an essential celebration meal for the New Year. Japanese people can often consume mochi in a variety of forms. This is traditionally made in a ceremony known as "Mochitsuki." Make a powder out of glutinous rice by grinding it with water. This method was known as wet milling. Today, glutinous rice flour is used in most rice cakes with bean paste available in stores. Mochi powder has made it possible to produce it fast, with consistent quality, and at any time.

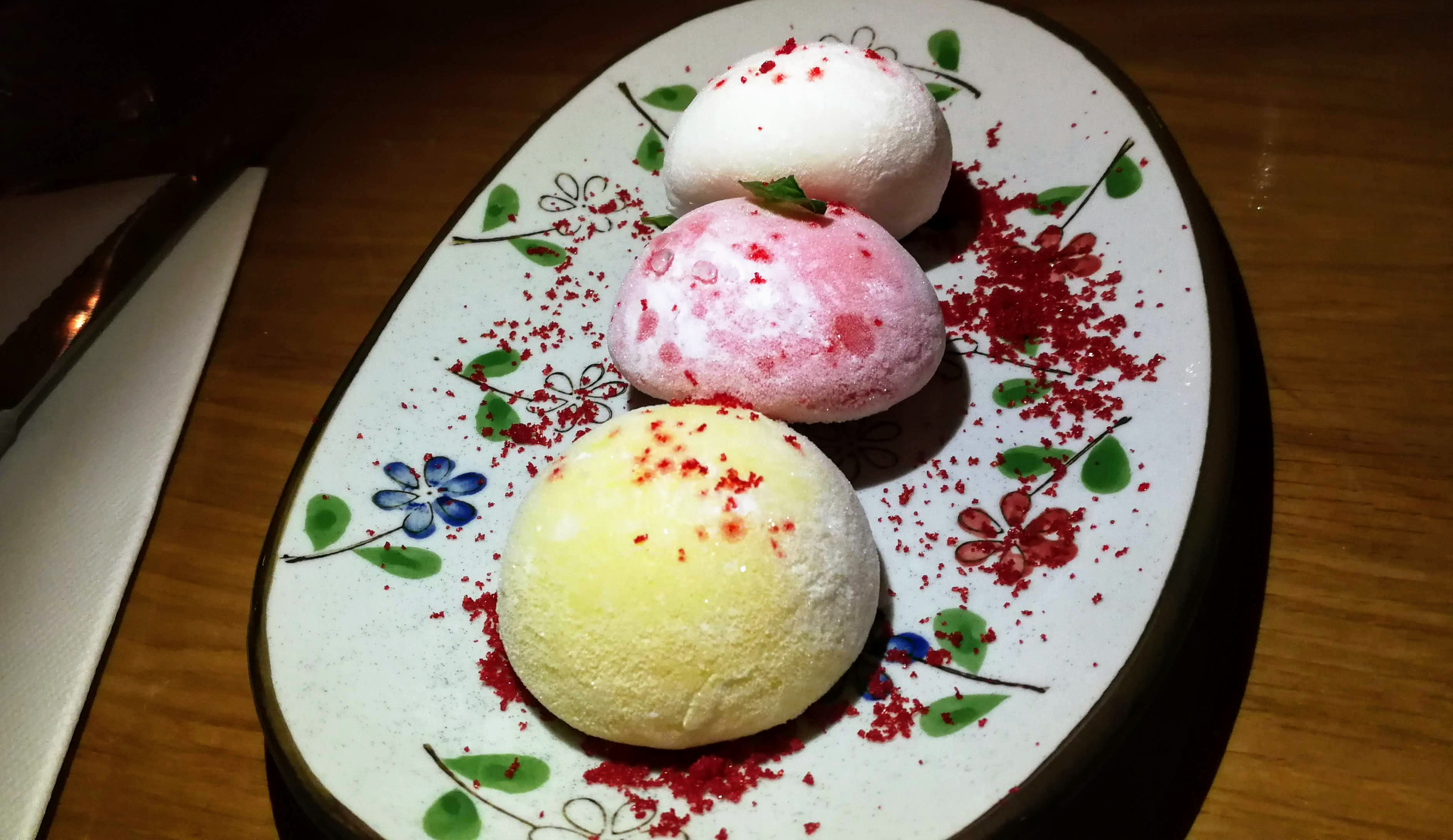
Mochigome

=== Malaysia ===
Badak Berendam is a Malay dessert made of glutinous rice balls filled with palm sugar and shredded coconut served in a creamy sweet coconut sauce. In Negeri Sembilan, this dessert is called Sopang. The name Badak Berendam means "Soaked rhinoceros".

=== Myanmar ===
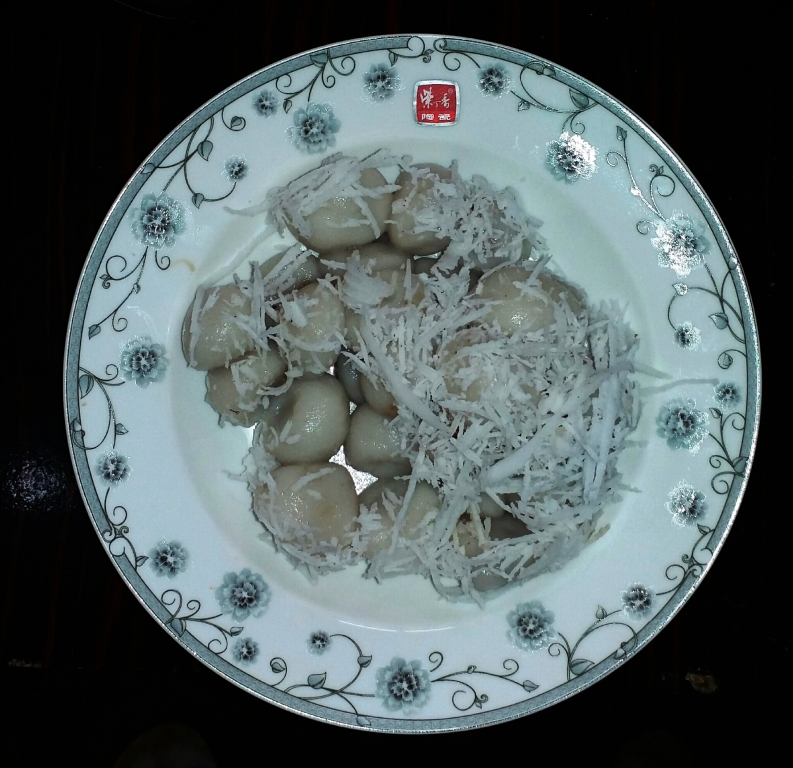
Mont Lone Yay Paw

The traditional Burmese sweet snack known as mont lone yay paw, or round snack on the water, is made from a mixture of glutinous rice flour, rice flour, water, and salt. Smooth balls made from the mixture filling with palm jaggery or palm sugar. The rice balls used in this dish get their name from their tendency to float to the top of the boiling water or coconut milk in which they are cooked once they are finished. The rice dumplings are typically served on a banana leaf while still warm and often sprinkled with desiccated or shredded coconut. The traditional time to make Mont Lone Yay Paw is during festive occasions like Myanmar New Year (also known as Thingyan or Water Festival), when groups of friends, neighbors, and family members come together to roll batch of rice balls and cook them in a large pot of boiling water over an open fire.

=== Philippines ===
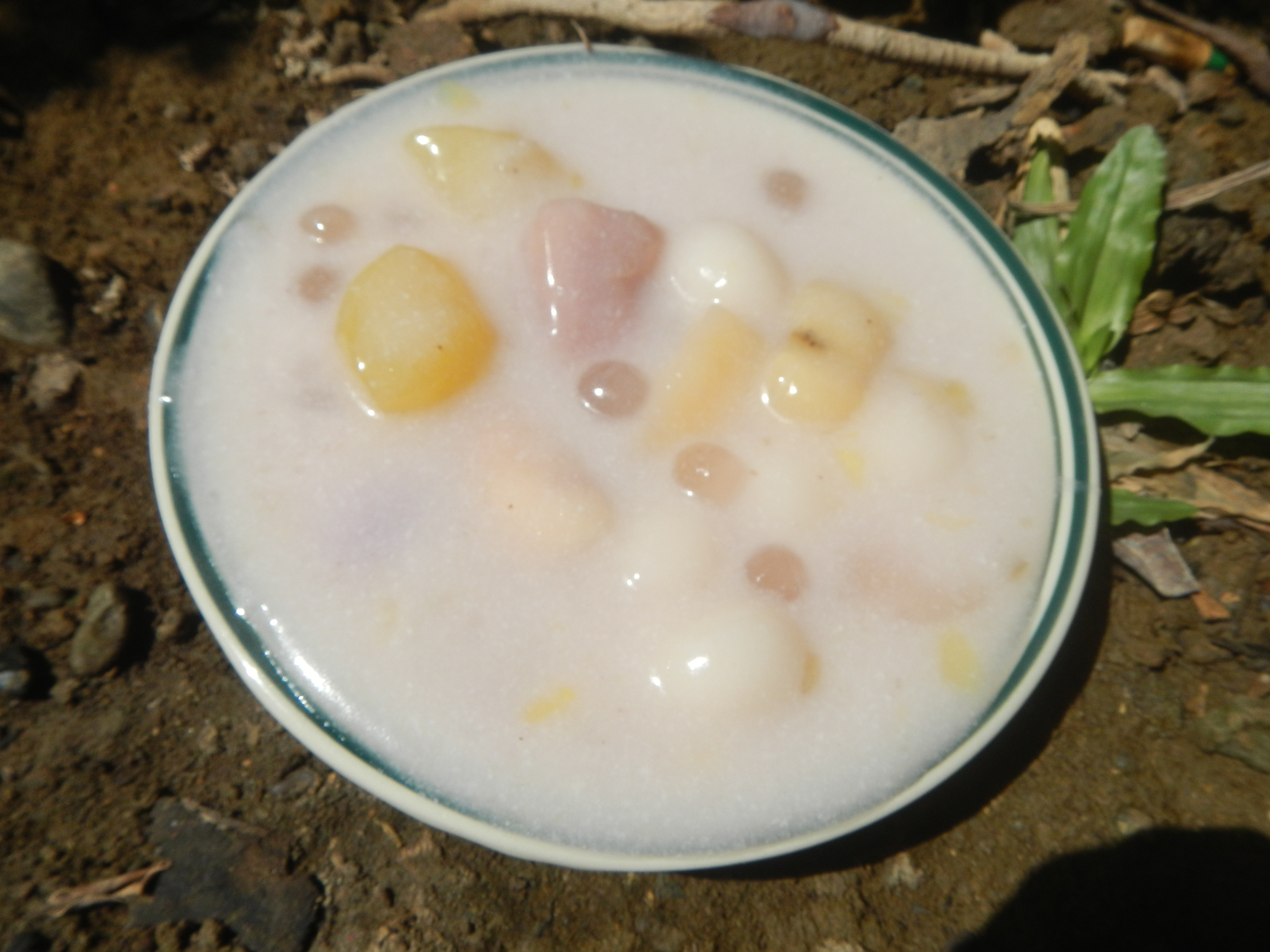
Ginataang Bilo-bilo

Ginataang Bilo-bilo with Langka is a Filipino snack dish. It is made of ripe jackfruit, coconut cream, sugar, sago pearls, and glutinous rice balls (known as bilo-bilo in the local language). Some people see this as a condensed form of the Ginataang halo-halo.

=== Vietnam ===
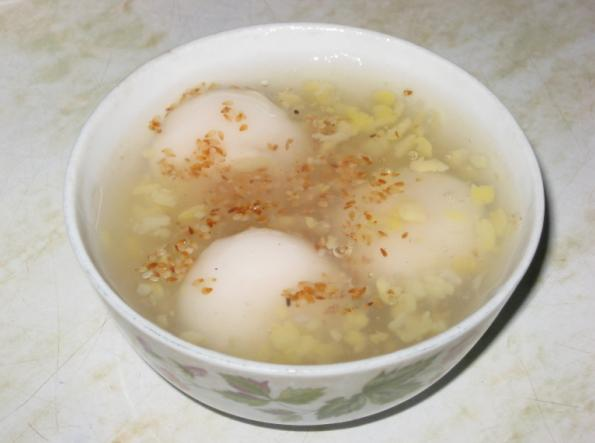
Bánh chay

Chè trôi nước (Bánh chay) is a Vietnamese dessert made of glutinous rice balls filled with mung beans and served with coconut sauce, toasted sesame seeds, and warm ginger syrup.

== Nutrition ==
When cooked, 1 cup (~240 mL) of Bua Loy has total calories of 295.5 kilocalories, protein of 10.4 g., carbohydrate of 6.3 g., and fat of 25 g.

== See also ==
- List of Thai desserts
- Thong Yip
- Thong Yot
- Maria Guyomar de Pinha
