= Bánh phu thê =

Vietnamese rice cake

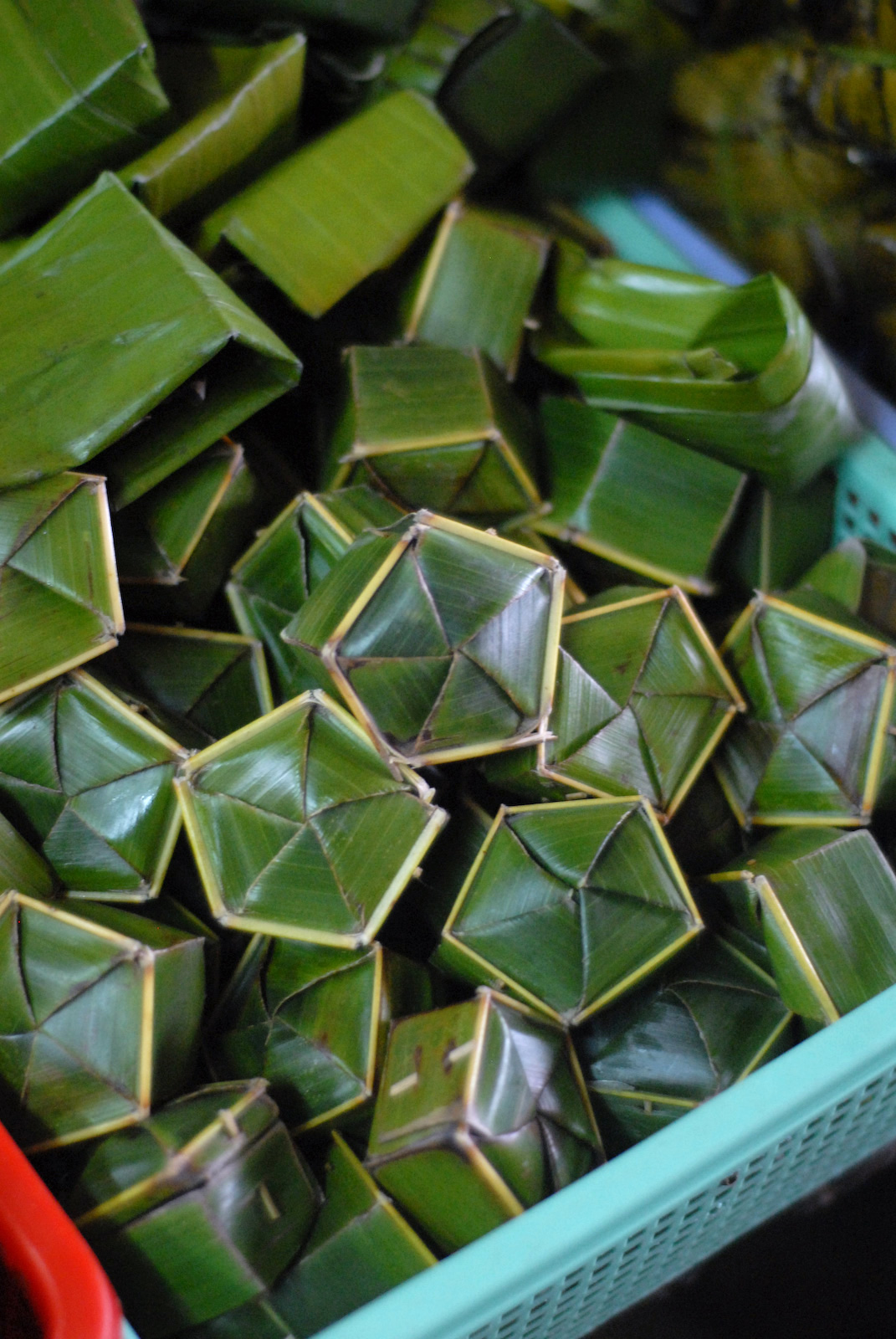
- Bánh phu thê, a Vietnamese dessert made with mung beans
- Type: Sweets
- Course: Dessert
- Place of origin: Vietnam
- Region or state: Southeast Asia
- Main ingredients: Tapioca flour, mung beans
- Similar dishes: Mizubotan

Bánh phu thê (lit. 'husband and wife cake') or bánh xu xê, is a Vietnamese dessert made from tapioca flour with mung bean stuffing wrapped in a box made of pandan leaves. The dessert was traditionally given by a suitor but is now part of many wedding banquets. It is traditional for a bridegroom to send bánh phu thê to the bride on the couple's wedding day to symbolize wishes for a happy future.

== See also ==
- Traditional Vietnamese wedding
